= Greensboro, North Carolina =

Greensboro
- City
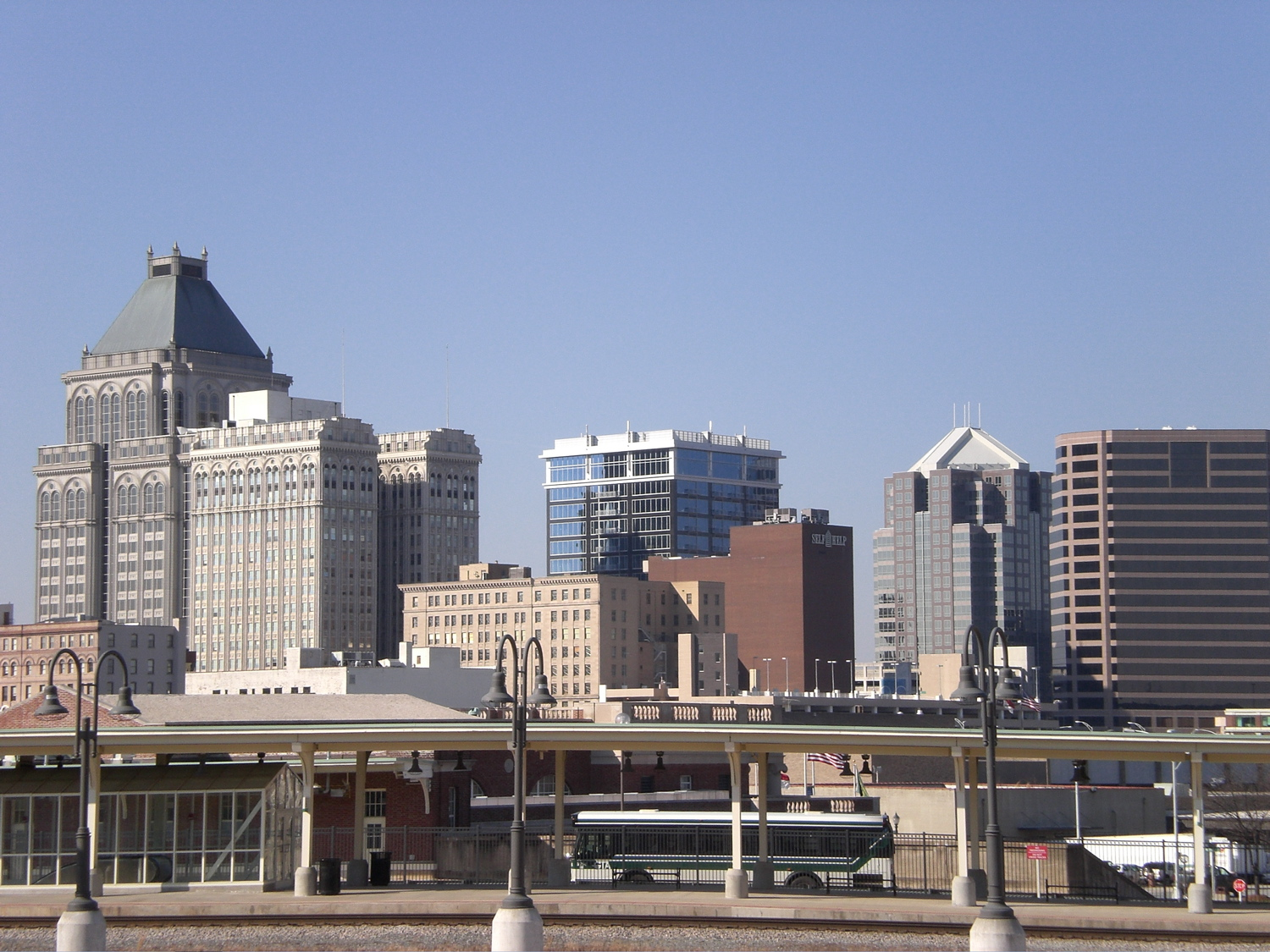
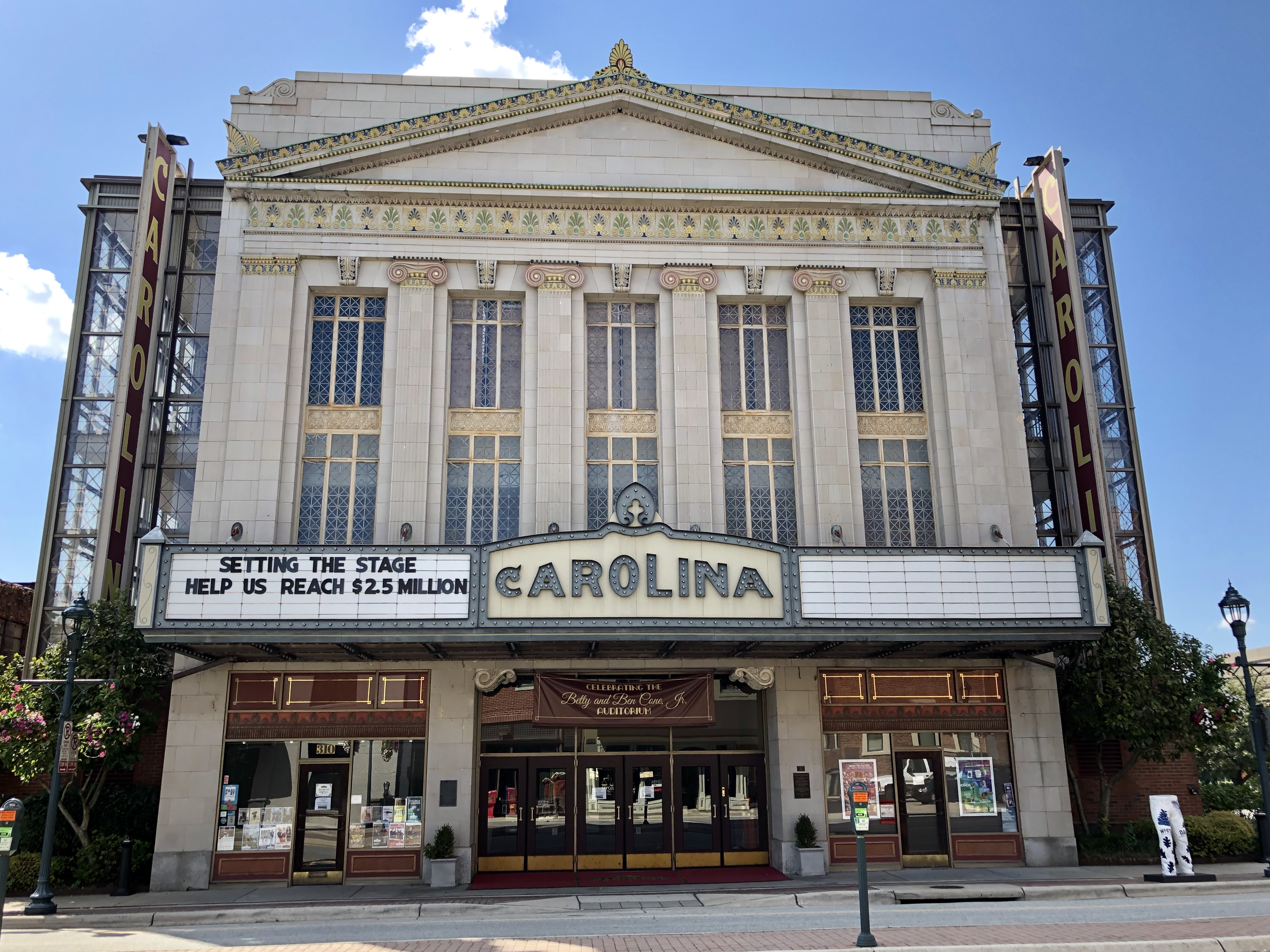
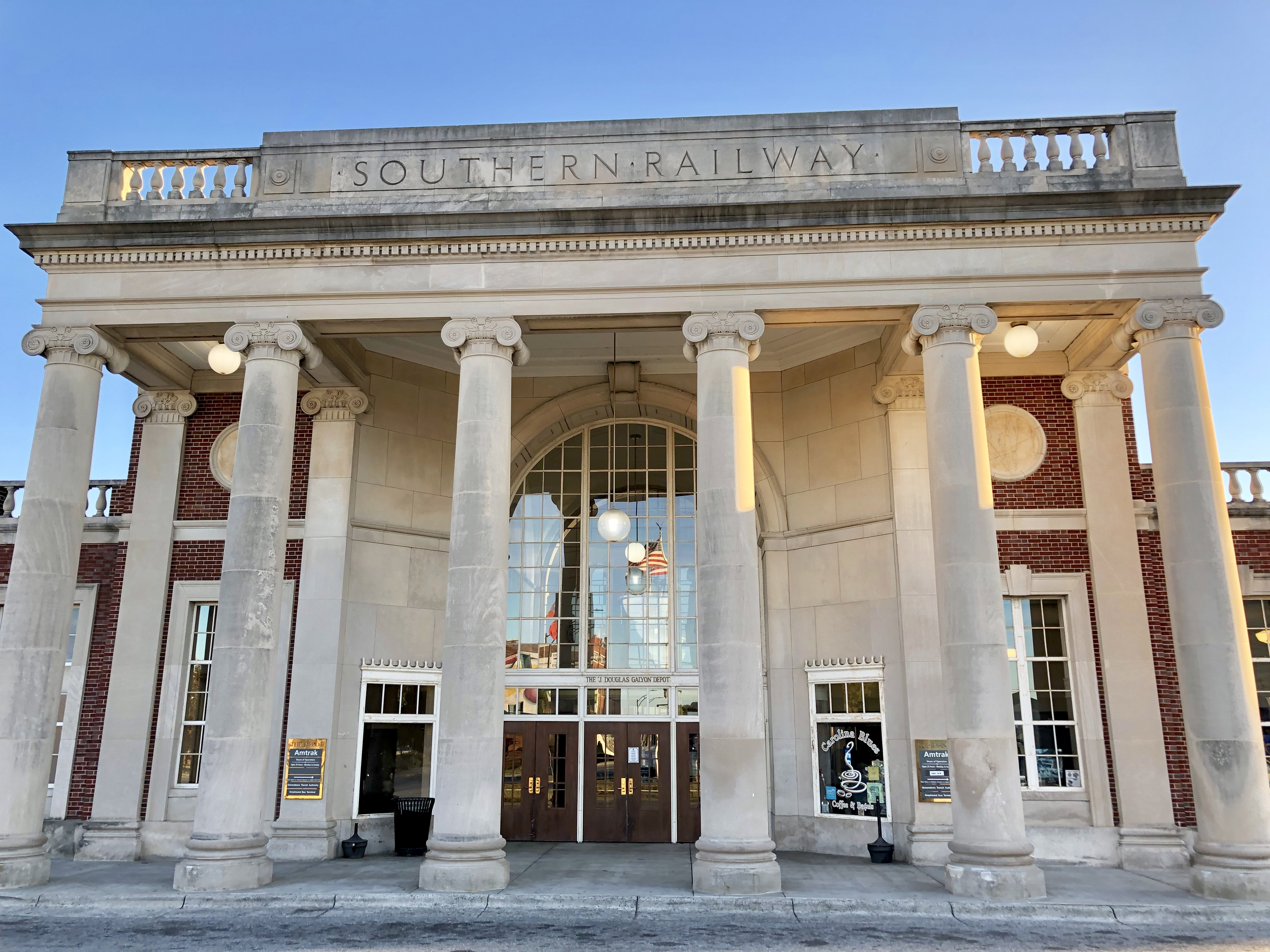
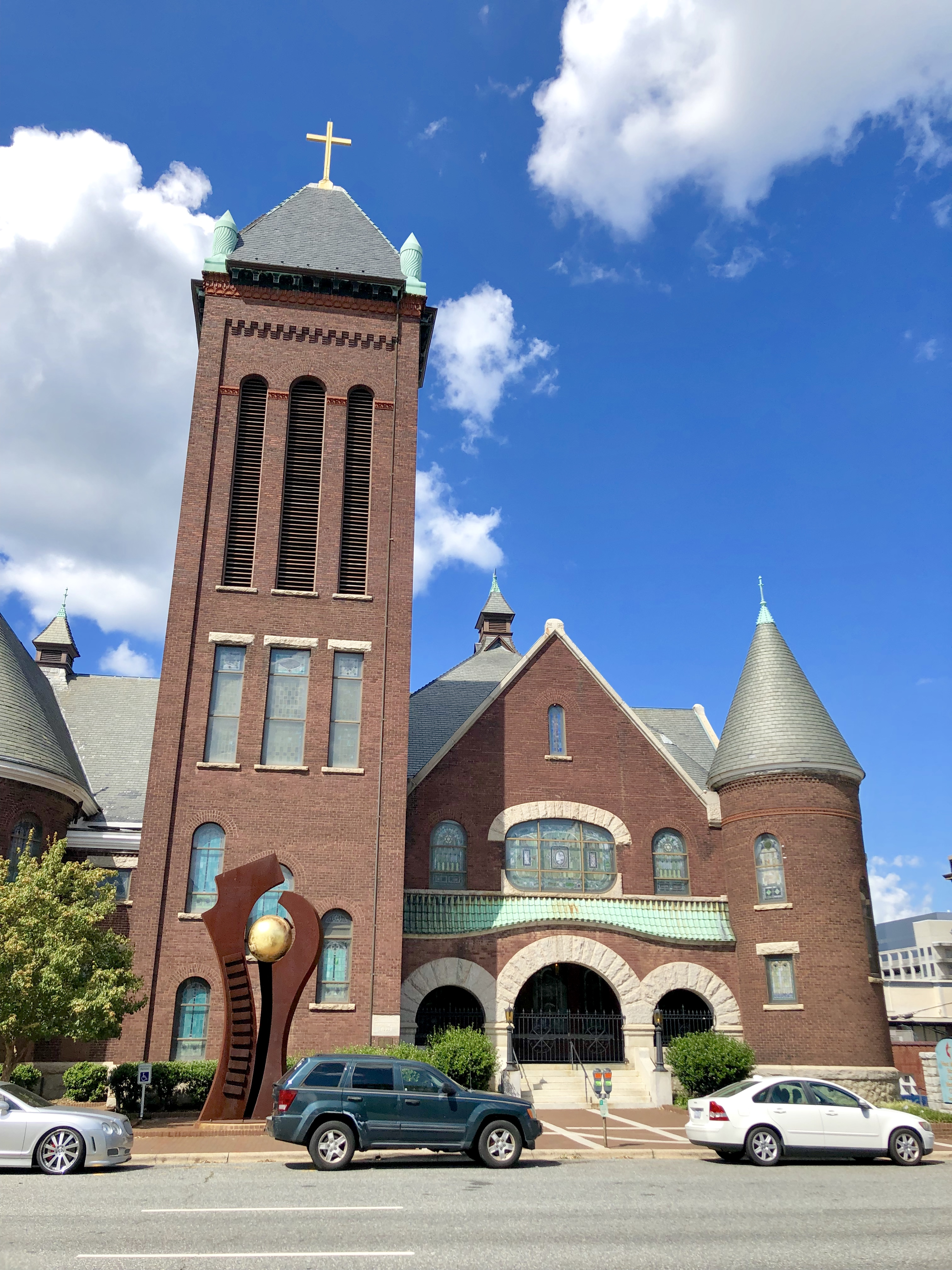
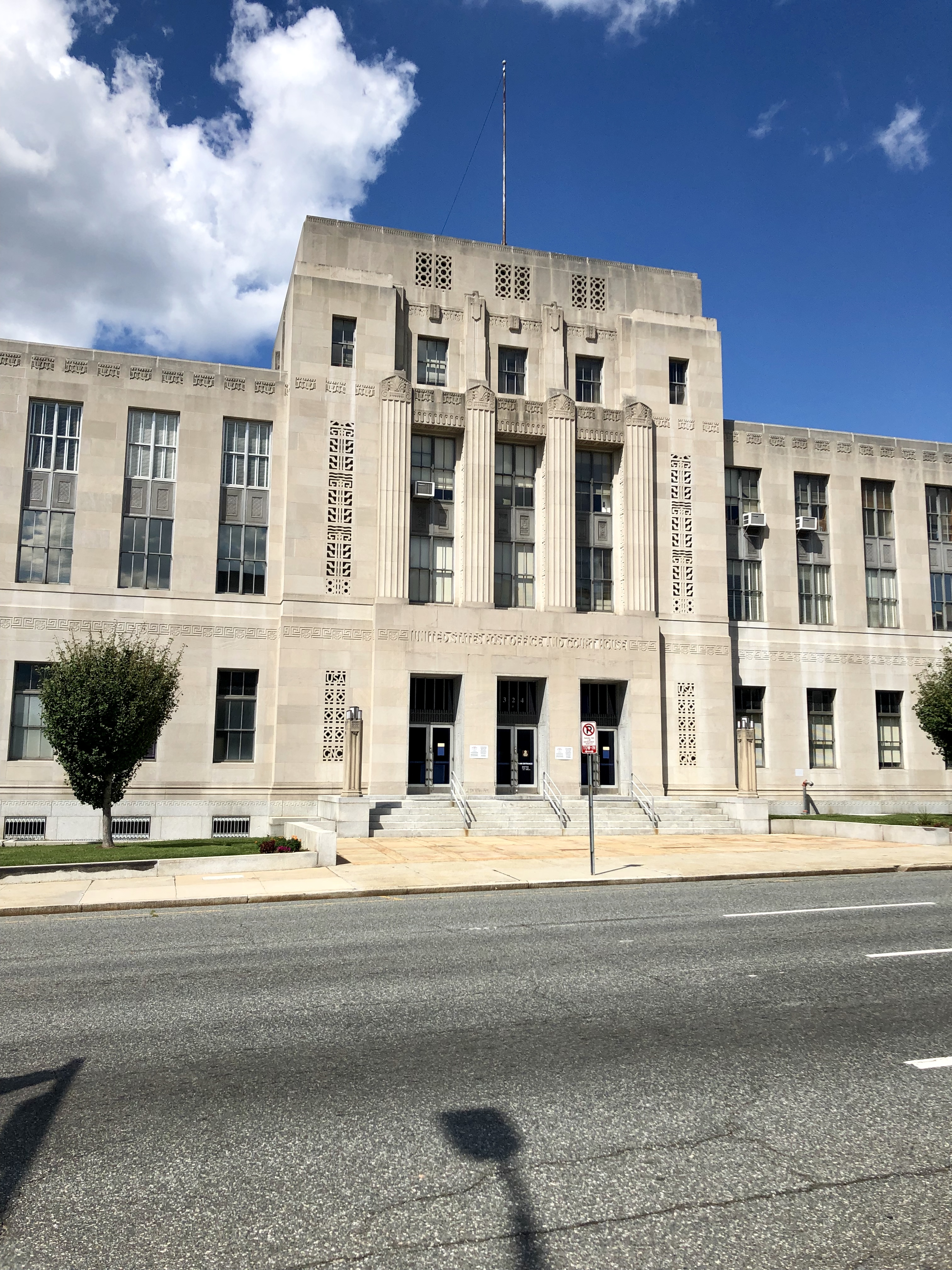
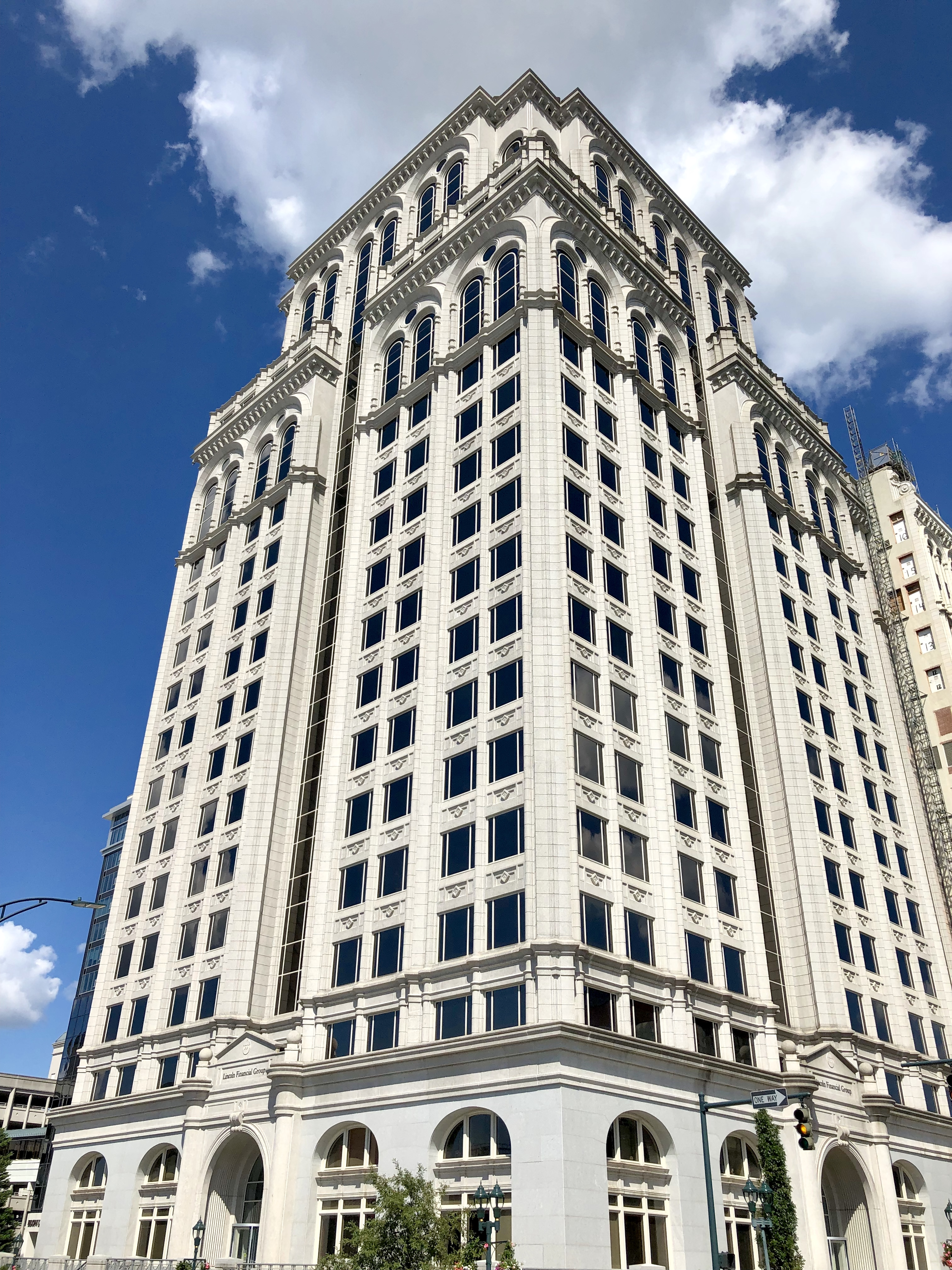
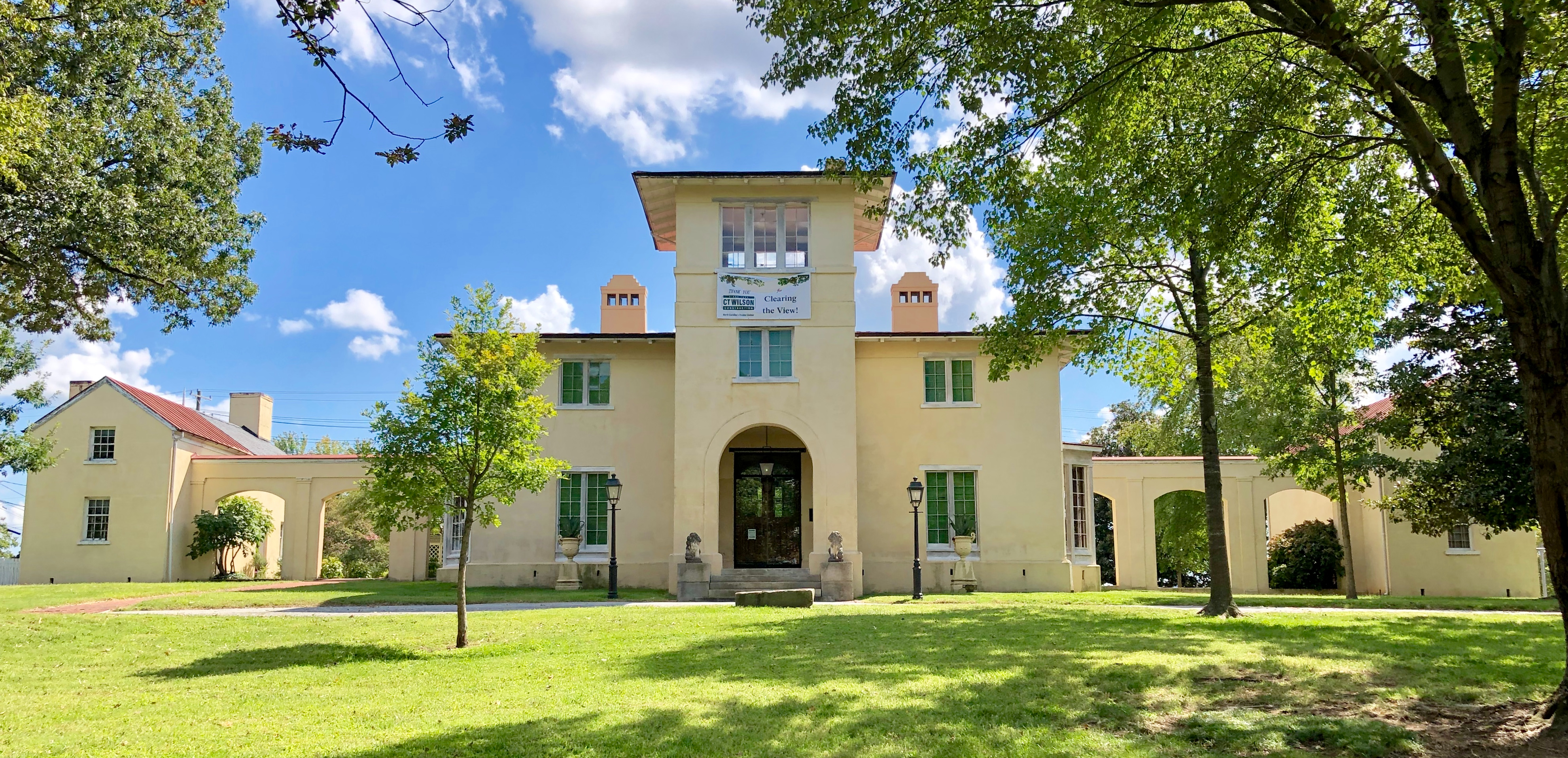
- Greensboro skyline The Carolina Theatre J. Douglas Galyon Depot West Market Street Church Preyer Courthouse Lincoln Financial Tower Blandwood Mansion and Gardens

- Flag Seal Logo
- Nicknames: The Gate City, The GSO, G'Boro, The Boro, Tournament Town
- Interactive map of Greensboro
- Location within North Carolina Location within the United States
- Coordinates: 36°4′21″N 79°47′25″W
- Country: United States
- State: North Carolina
- County: Guilford
- Established: 1808
- Named for: Nathanael Greene

Government
  - Type: Council–manager
  - Body: Greensboro City Council
  - Mayor: Marikay Abuzuaiter (D)
  - City Manager: Nathaniel "Trey" Davis

Area
  - Total: 136.65 sq mi (353.92 km^{2})
  - Land: 131.41 sq mi (340.35 km^{2})
  - Water: 5.24 sq mi (13.57 km^{2}) 3.83%
- Elevation: 897 ft (273 m)

Population (2020)
  - Total: 299,035
  - Estimate (2025): 308,667 ▲
  - Rank: 3rd in North Carolina; 69th in United States
  - Density: 2,275.6/sq mi (878.61/km^{2})
  - Urban: 338,928 (US: 120th)
  - Urban density: 2,002/sq mi (772.9/km^{2})
  - Metro: 800,722 (US: 78th)

GDP
  - Greensboro (MSA): $41.4 billion (2022)
- Time zone: UTC−5 (EST)
  - Summer (DST): UTC−4 (EDT)
- ZIP Codes: 27401–27413, 27415, 27420, 27429, 27435, 27438, 27455, 27495, 27497–27499
- Area code: 336, 743
- FIPS code: 37-28000
- Website: greensboro-nc.gov

Greensboro (/ˈɡriːnzbəroʊ/; locally /ˈɡriːnzbʌrə/) is a city in Guilford County, North Carolina, United States, and its county seat. The Greensboro–High Point metropolitan area has an estimated 801,000 residents, with the metropolitan area also encompassing the overall center of North Carolina. The city of Greensboro is the most populous city in Piedmont Triad region of North Carolina, which is home to about 1.7 million residents. The population of the city of Greensboro was 299,035 in the 2020 census and estimated at 308,667 in 2025, making it the third-most populous city in North Carolina and the 67th-most populous city in the U.S.

In 1808, Greensboro was planned around a central courthouse square to succeed Guilford Court House as the county seat. The county courts were thus placed closer to the county's geographical center, a location more easily reached at the time by the majority of the county's citizens, who traveled by horse or on foot. Three major Interstate Highways (Interstate 40, Interstate 85, and Interstate 73) in the Piedmont region of central North Carolina were built to intersect at this city.

Among Greensboro's many notable attractions, some of the most popular are the Greensboro Science Center, the International Civil Rights Museum (site of the historic Woolworth's sit-ins), the Steven Tanger Center for the Performing Arts, the Weatherspoon Art Museum, the Greensboro Symphony, and the Greensboro Ballet. Annual events in the city include the North Carolina Folk Festival, First Fridays in Downtown Greensboro, Fun Fourth of July Festival, North Carolina Comedy Festival, and Winter Wonderlights. From 2015 to 2017, Greensboro hosted the National Folk Festival.

The Greensboro Coliseum Complex hosts a variety of major sporting events, concerts, and other events, including the ACC men's basketball tournament and women's basketball tournament. Local professional teams include the Greensboro Grasshoppers of the South Atlantic Baseball League, the Greensboro Swarm of the NBA G League, the Greensboro Gargoyles of the ECHL, and the semi-professional Carolina Dynamo soccer club of USL League Two. Amateur teams include Greensboro Roller Derby and college teams in four NCAA programs. The Sedgefield Country Club is currently host to the annual PGA Tour event Wyndham Golf Championship. Greensboro would serve as the Atlantic Coast Conference headquarters for 70 years, until the league relocated to Charlotte, North Carolina, in 2023.

== History ==
=== Early history ===
Prior to the arrival of Europeans, inhabitants of the area that became Greensboro were the Saura. Other indigenous cultures had occupied this area for thousands of years, typically settling along the waterways, as did the later European settlers.

Quaker migrants from Pennsylvania, by way of Maryland, arrived at Capefair (now Greensboro) in about 1750. The new settlers began organized religious services affiliated with the Cane Creek Friends Meeting in Snow Camp in 1751. Three years later, 40 Quaker families were granted approval to establish New Garden Monthly Meeting. The action is recorded in the minutes of the Perquimans and Little River Quarterly Meeting on May 25, 1754: "To Friends at New Garden in Capefair", signed by Joseph Ratliff. The settlement grew rapidly over the next three years, adding members from as far away as Nantucket, Massachusetts. It soon became North Carolina's most important Quaker community and the mother of several other Quaker meetings established in the state and west of the Appalachians.

After the Revolutionary War, the city of Greensboro was named for Major General Nathanael Greene, commander of the rebel American forces at the Battle of Guilford Court House on March 15, 1781. Although the Americans lost the battle, Greene's forces inflicted heavy casualties on the British Army of General Cornwallis. After the battle, Cornwallis withdrew his troops to a British coastal base in Wilmington.

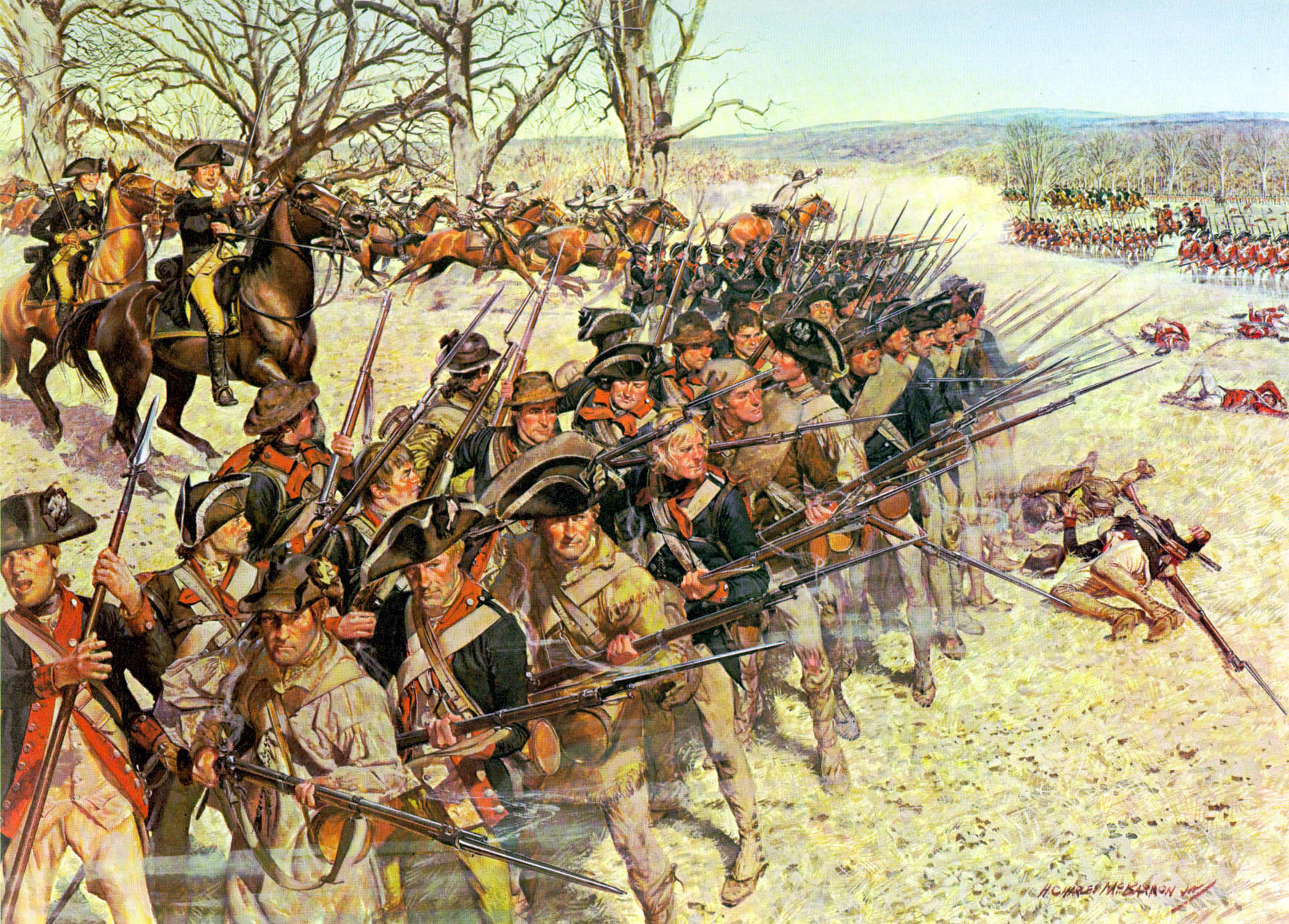
The Battle of Guilford Courthouse

Greensboro was established near the geographic center of Guilford County, on land that was "an unbroken forest with thick undergrowth of huckleberry bushes, that bore a finely flavored fruit." Property for the future village was purchased from the Saura for $98. Three north–south streets (Greene, Elm, Davie) were laid out intersecting with three east–west streets, Gaston, Market, and Sycamore. The courthouse was built at the center of the intersection of Elm and Market streets. By 1821, the town was home to 369 residents.

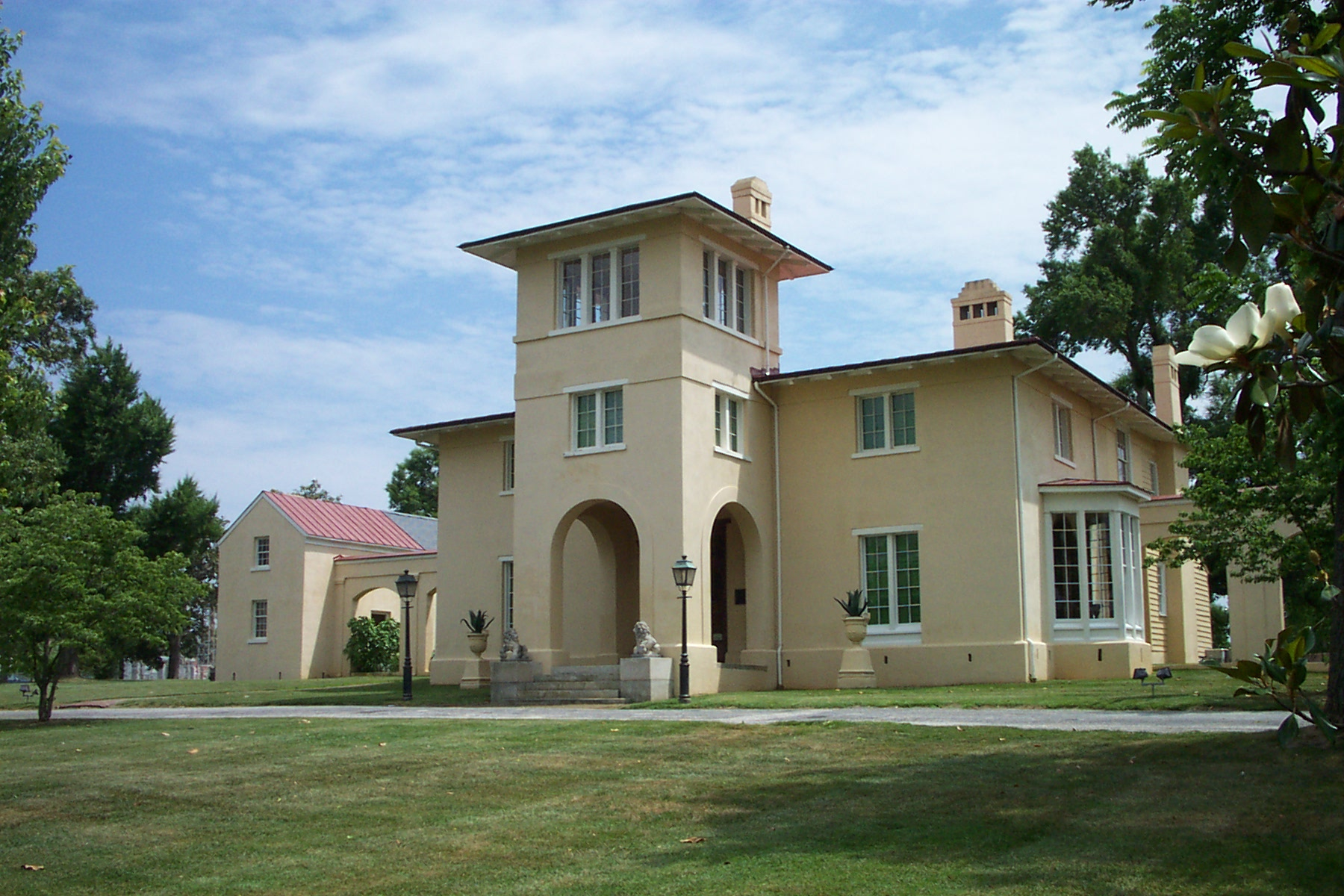
Blandwood Mansion, by Alexander Jackson Davis

In the early 1840s, the state government designated Greensboro as one of the stops on a new railroad line, at the request of Governor John Motley Morehead, whose house, Blandwood, was in Greensboro. Stimulated by rail traffic and improved access to markets, the city grew substantially, soon becoming known as the "Gate City" due to its role as a transportation hub for the Piedmont. The railroads transported goods to and from the cotton textile mills. Many of the manufacturers developed workers' housing in mill villages near their facilities.

Though the city developed slowly, early wealth generated in the 18th and 19th centuries from cotton trade and merchandising resulted in owners' constructing several notable buildings. The earliest, later named Blandwood Mansion and Gardens, was built by a farmer in 1795. Additions to this residence in 1846, designed by Alexander Jackson Davis, made the house influential as America's earliest Tuscan-style villa. It has been designated a National Historic Landmark. Other significant houses and estates were developed, including Dunleith, designed by Samuel Sloan; Bellemeade; and the Bumpass-Troy House. Since the late 20th century, the latter has been adapted and operates as a private inn.

=== Civil War and last days of the Confederacy ===
In the mid-19th century, many of the residents of the Piedmont and western areas of the state were Unionist, and Guilford County did not vote for secession. But once North Carolina joined the Confederacy, some citizens joined the Confederate cause, forming infantry units such as the Guilford Grays to fight in the American Civil War. From 1861 to March 1865 the city was relatively untouched by the war, although residents had to deal with regional shortages of clothing, medicine, and other items caused by the US naval blockade of the South.

In the war's final weeks, Greensboro played a unique role in the last days of the Confederate government. In April 1865, the commanding officer of the Army of Tennessee, General Joseph E. Johnston, instructed General P. G. T. Beauregard to prepare to defend the city. During this time, Confederate President Jefferson Davis and the remaining members of the Confederate cabinet had evacuated the Confederate Capital in Richmond, Virginia, and moved south to Danville, Virginia.

When Union cavalry threatened Danville, Davis and his cabinet managed to escape by train, and reassembled in Greensboro on April 11, 1865. While in the city, Davis and his cabinet decided to try to split up and make their way west of the Mississippi River to continue the war effort and avoid capture. Shortly thereafter, the cabinet left Greensboro and separated. Greensboro is notable as the last place where the entire Confederate government met as a group; some consider it the Confederacy's final capital city.

At nearly the same time, Governor Zebulon B. Vance fled Raleigh, the capital of North Carolina, before the forces of Union General William Tecumseh Sherman swept the city. For a brief period beginning April 16, 1865, he and other officials maintained the state capital in Greensboro. Vance proclaimed the North Carolina Surrender Declaration on April 28, 1865. Later, he surrendered to Union officials in the parlor of Blandwood Mansion. Historian Blackwell Robinson wrote, "Greensboro witnessed not only the demise of the Confederacy but also that of the old civil government of the state."

Once surrender negotiations were completed at Bennett Place (in present-day Durham) between General Johnston and General Sherman on April 26, 1865, Confederate soldiers in Greensboro stacked their arms, received their paroles, and headed home.

=== Industrialization and growth ===
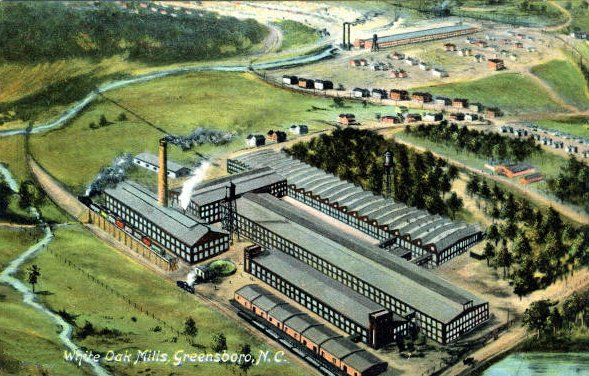
White Oak Mill in 1909

After the war, investors worked to restore the textile mills and related industry. In the 1890s, the city continued to attract attention from northern industrialists, including Moses and Caesar Cone of Baltimore. The Cone brothers established large-scale textile plants, changing Greensboro from a village to a city within a decade. By 1900, Greensboro was considered a center of the Southern textile industry, with large-scale factories producing denim, flannel, and overalls. The resulting prosperity was expressed in the construction of notable 20th-century civic architecture, including the Guilford County Courthouse, West Market Street United Methodist Church by S. W. Faulk, several buildings designed by Frank A. Weston, and the Julius I. Foust Building of the University of North Carolina at Greensboro, designed by Orlo Epps.

During the 20th century, Greensboro continued to increase in population and wealth. Grand commercial and civic buildings, many of which still stand today, were designed by local architects Charles Hartmann and Harry Barton. Other notable industries became established in the city, including Vicks Chemical Co. (known for over-the-counter cold remedies such as VapoRub and NyQuil), Carolina Steel Corporation, and Pomona Terra Cotta Works. During the first three decades, Greensboro grew so rapidly that there was an acute worker housing shortage. Builders set a construction goal of 80 to 100 affordable housing units per year to provide homes for workers. Greensboro's real estate was considered "the wonder of the state" in the 1920s. Growth continued even through the Great Depression, as Greensboro attracted an estimated 200 new families per year. The city earned a reputation as a well-planned community with a strong emphasis on education, parks, and a profitable employment base.

Greensboro has two major public research universities, North Carolina A&T State University, a historically black college established in the late 19th century, and the University of North Carolina at Greensboro. During the height of the civil rights movement in the early 1960s, students from A&T were the major force in protests to achieve racial justice, desegregation of public facilities, and fair employment, beginning with the Greensboro Four, who sat in at the segregated lunch counter at Woolworth's in 1960 to gain service. The largest civil rights protests in North Carolina history took place in Greensboro in May and June 1963. In the 21st century, the universities are leaders in new areas of research in high tech and science, on which the city hopes to build a new economy.

Wartime and postwar prosperity brought development, and designs commissioned from nationally and internationally known architects. Walter Gropius, a leader of the German Bauhaus movement in the United States, designed a factory building in the city in 1944. Greensboro-based Ed Loewenstein designed projects throughout the region. Eduardo Catalano and George Matsumoto were hired for projects whose designs have challenged North Carolinians with modernist architectural concepts and forms.

=== Civil rights movement ===
In 1960, the U.S. Census Bureau reported Greensboro's population as 74.0% white and 25.8% black. As in the rest of the state, most blacks were still disenfranchised under state laws, Jim Crow laws and customs were in effect, and public facilities, including schools, were racially segregated by law. This was after the U.S. Supreme Court's 1954 ruling in Brown v. Board of Education that segregation in public schools was unconstitutional. Facilities reserved for blacks were generally underfunded by the state and city governments, which were dominated by conservative white Democrats.

In the postwar period, blacks in North Carolina and across the South pushed to regain their constitutional rights. Mostly black women from Bennett college originally had been the original protesters coordinating against Jim-Crow laws. In turn, college students from North Carolina Agricultural and Technical College (A&T), a historically black college, made Greensboro a center of protests and change. On February 1, 1960, four black college students sat down at an "all-white" Woolworth's lunch counter, and refused to leave after they were denied service. They had already purchased items in other parts of the store and kept their receipts. After being denied lunch service, they brought out the receipts, asking why their money was good everywhere else in the store but not at the lunch counter. Hundreds of supporters soon joined in this sit-in, which lasted several months.Such protests quickly spread across the South, ultimately leading to the desegregation of lunch counters and other facilities at Woolworth's and other chains.

Woolworth's went out of business due to changes in 20th-century retail practices, but the original Woolworth's lunch counter and stools are still in their original location. The former Woolworth's building has been adapted as the International Civil Rights Center and Museum, which opened on February 1, 2010, the 50th anniversary of the sit-ins. A section of the counter is on display at the Smithsonian in Washington, D.C. to mark the protesters' courage.

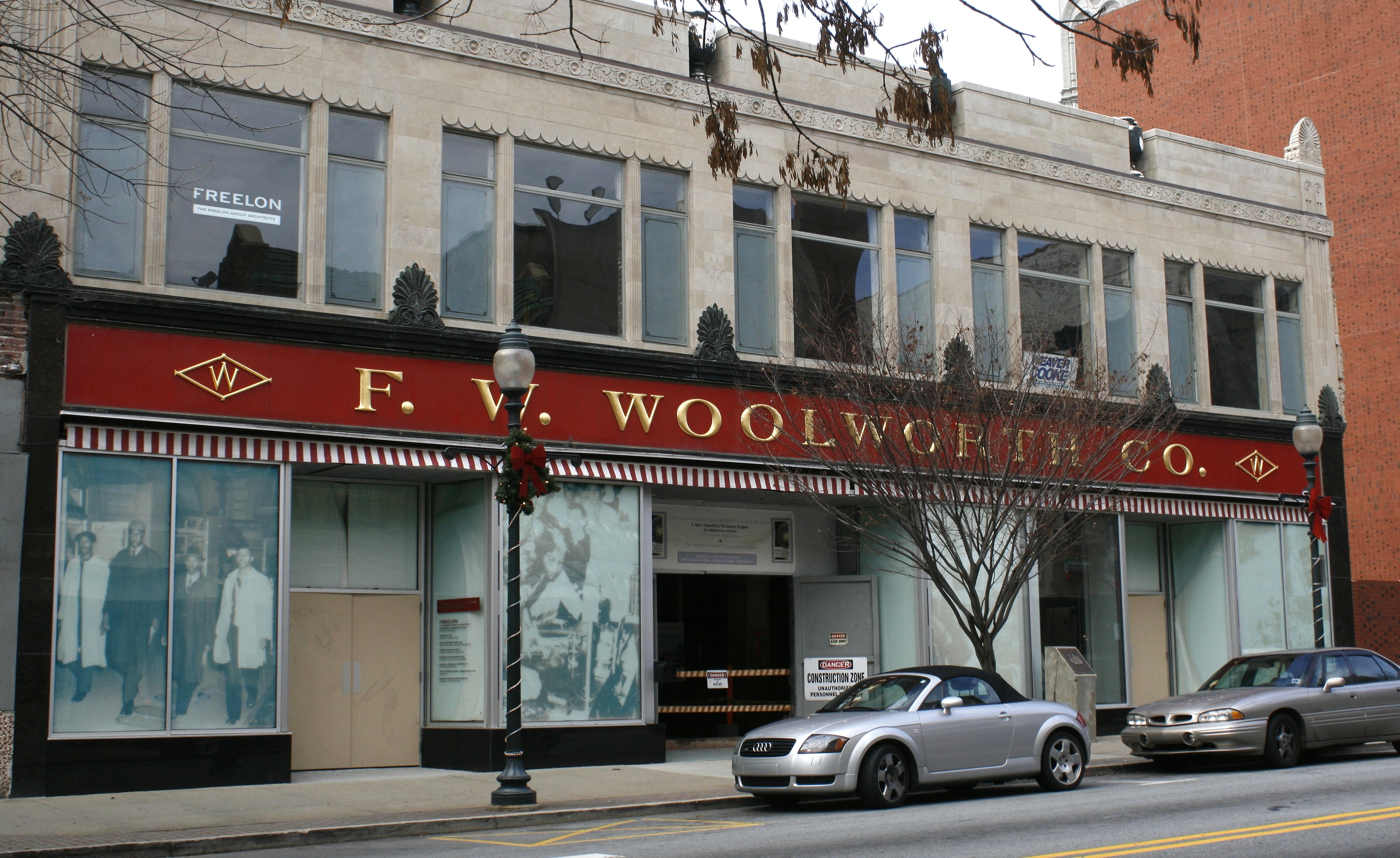
Former Woolworth's store, now the International Civil Rights Center and Museum

The white business community acceded to the desegregation of Woolworth's and made other minor concessions, but the civil rights movement had additional goals, holding protests in 1962 and 1963. In May and June 1963, the largest civil rights protest in North Carolina history took place in Greensboro. Protesters sought desegregation of public accommodations, and economic and social justice, such as hiring policies based on merit rather than race. They also worked for the overdue integration of public schools.

Each night more than 2,000 protesters marched through Greensboro's segregated central business district. William Thomas and A. Knighton Stanley, coordinators of Greensboro's local CORE chapter, invited Jesse Jackson, then an activist student at A&T, to join the protests. Jackson quickly rose to prominence as a student leader, becoming the public spokesman of the non-violent protest movement. Seeking to overwhelm city jails, as was done in protests led by Martin Luther King Jr. in Birmingham, Alabama, the protesters invited arrest by violating segregation rules of local businesses; they were charged with trespassing and other nonviolent actions. College and high school students constituted most of the protesters, and at one point approximately 1,400 blacks were jailed in Greensboro. The scale of protests disrupted the business community and challenged the leadership of the mayor and Governor Terry Sanford.

Finally, the city and business community responded with further desegregation of public facilities, reformed hiring policies in city government, and commitments to progress by both Sanford and Greensboro's mayor. Sanford declared, "Anyone who hasn't received this message doesn't understand human nature." Significant changes in race relations still came at a painfully slow pace, and the verbal commitments from white leadership in 1963 were not implemented in substantial ways.

=== Dudley High School/A&T protests ===
During the summer many High-school groups coordinated sit-ins, while their college students were occupied.Mainly students from James B Dudley High school. In May 1969, students of James B. Dudley High School were outraged when the administration refused to let a popular candidate, Claude Barnes, run for student union class president, allegedly due to his membership in Youth for the Unity of Black Society. After their appeals to the school were rejected, the students asked activists at North Carolina A&T State University for support in a protest. Protests escalated and after students at A&T had thrown rocks at police, they returned on May 21 armed with tear gas canisters, using them against the crowds. The uprising grew larger, and the governor ordered the National Guard to back up local police.

After there were exchanges of gunfire, the governor ordered the North Carolina National Guard into the A&T campus, in what was described at the time as "the most massive armed assault ever made against an American university". The North Carolina National Guard swept the college dormitories, taking hundreds of students into "protective custody". The demonstrations were suppressed. The North Carolina State Advisory Committee to the United States Commission on Civil Rights investigated the disturbances; its 1970 report concluded that the National Guard invasion was a reckless action disproportionate to the danger posed by student protests. It criticized local community leaders for failing to respond adequately to the Dudley High School students when the issues first arose. They declared it "a sad commentary that the only group in the community who would take the Dudley students seriously were the students at A&T State University".

=== Greensboro massacre ===
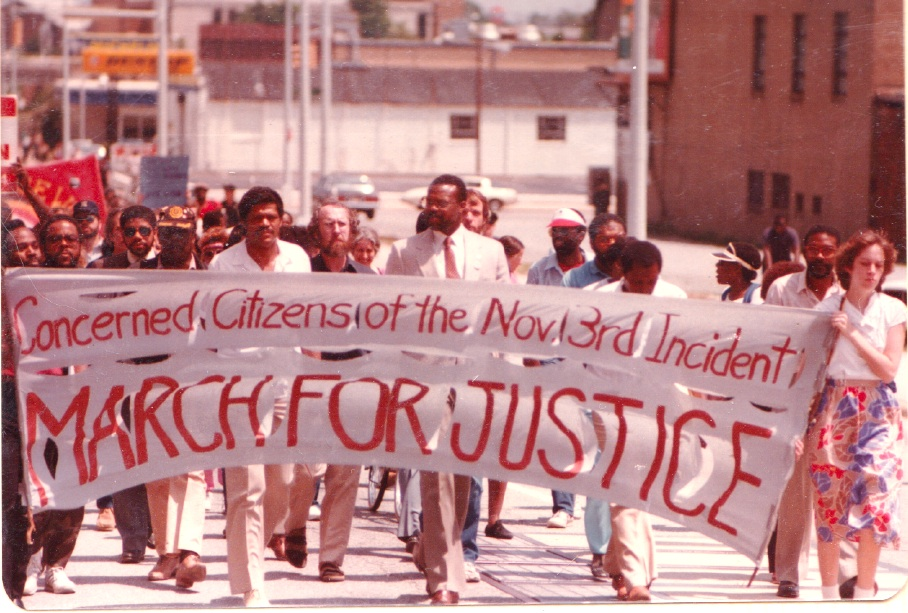
Greensboro massacre march

On November 3, 1979, members of what would become the Communist Workers Party (CWP) held an anti-Ku Klux Klan rally at the Morningside Homes public housing project. Four local TV news stations covered it. During the protest, two cars containing Klansmen and neo-Nazis arrived. After a confrontation, the KKK and CWP groups exchanged gunfire. Five CWP members were killed. Eleven CWP members and one Klansman were injured. Television footage of the actions was shown worldwide, and the event became known as the Greensboro massacre. In November 1980, six KKK defendants were acquitted in a state criminal trial by an all-white jury after a week of deliberation. Families of those killed and injured in the attack filed a civil suit against the city and police department for failure to protect citizens. In 1985, a jury in this case found five police officers and two other individuals liable for $350,000 in damages; the monies were to be paid to the Greensboro Justice Fund, established to advance civil rights.

=== 21st century ===
Textile companies and related businesses continue into the 21st century, when most went bankrupt, reorganized, and/or merged with other companies as textile manufacturing jobs moved offshore. Greensboro is still a major center of the textile industry, with the main offices of Elevate Textiles (Cone, Burlington Industries), Galey & Lord, Unifi, and VF Corporation (Wrangler, Lee, Helly Hansen, Musto, and Rock & Republic), ITG Brands, maker of Kool, Winston and Salem brand cigarettes and the nation's third-largest tobacco company is headquartered in Greensboro.

Rail traffic continues to be important for the city's economy, as Greensboro is a major regional freight hub. Twelve Amtrak passenger trains also stop in Greensboro daily. The Crescent has its platform on the main Norfolk Southern line between Washington and New Orleans by way of Atlanta. The Carolinian and Piedmont trains have their platform at the start of Norfolk Southern NC-Line that runs from Greensboro to Goldsboro, NC. The Norfolk Southern K-Line starts at the Pomona freight yard just west of downtown and runs towards Winston-Salem. The Norfolk Southern CF-Line originally started in Mt. Airy, NC but rail has been removed north of downtown and now starts at the wye with the mainline downtown and heads south to Gulf, NC.

== Geography ==
According to the United States Census Bureau, Greensboro has an area of 136.65 square miles (353.9 km^{2}), of which 131.41 square miles (340.4 km^{2}) is land and 5.24 square miles (13.6 km^{2}) (3.83%) is water.

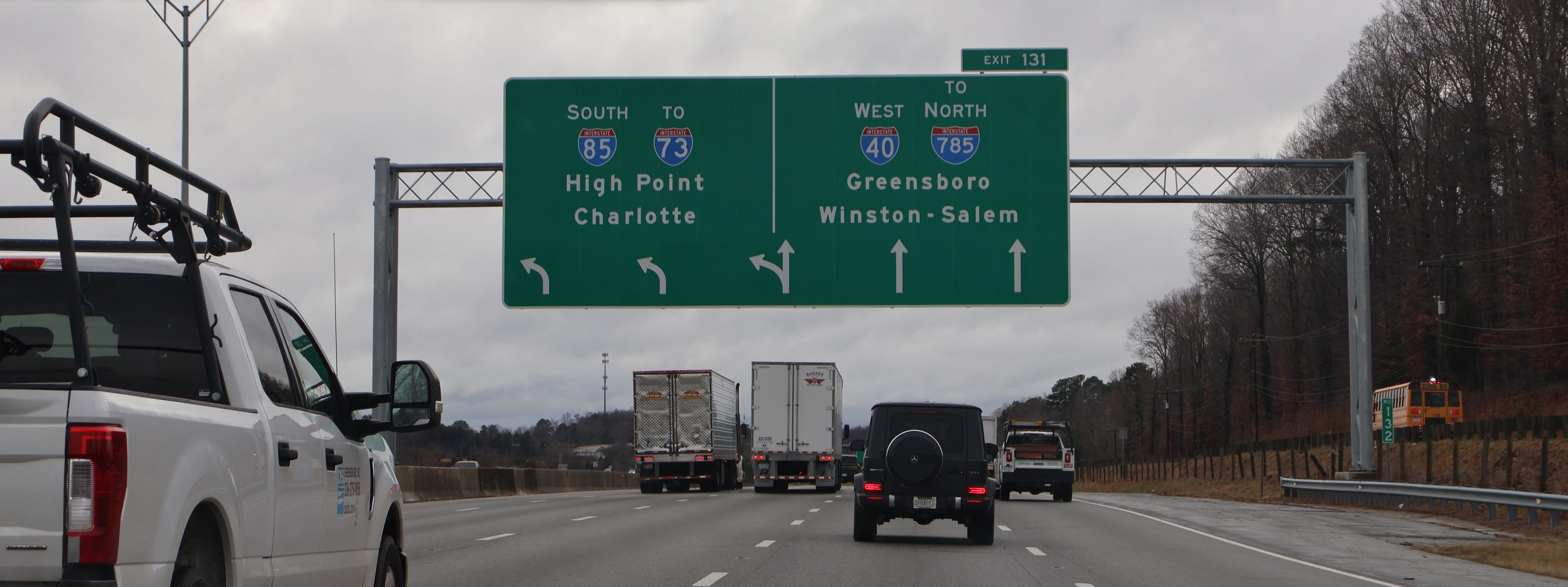
With the Greensboro-High Point Metropolitan District "developing" into the Overall Center of NC in recent time periods, have resulted in "extensive" highway network

The city of Greensboro was considered and more "geographically" designated as being in the western outskirts of the Eastern Half of North Carolina for several "time periods." In recent years, the city had become more "developed" in being in the overall center of North Carolina, also due to the growing Greensboro-High Point metropolitan area, which had become designated in the overall center of the state, alongside being one of the largest "hub centers" in the state. The city lies among the rolling hills of the Piedmont region of North Carolina, with the city located in the center of the state between the Blue Ridge and Great Smoky Mountains to the west and the Atlantic beaches and Outer Banks to the east. The view of Greensboro from its highest building—the Lincoln Financial tower, commonly known as the Jefferson-Pilot Building after its previous owner,—shows an expanse of shade trees in the city.

Interstates 40, 73, and 85 intersect at Greensboro. Greensboro is 29 miles (47 km) east of Winston-Salem, 54 miles (87 km) west of Durham, 77 miles (124 km) northwest of Raleigh, 90 miles (140 km) northeast of Charlotte, and 201 miles (323 km) southwest of Richmond, Virginia.

=== Neighborhoods and districts ===
==== Downtown ====
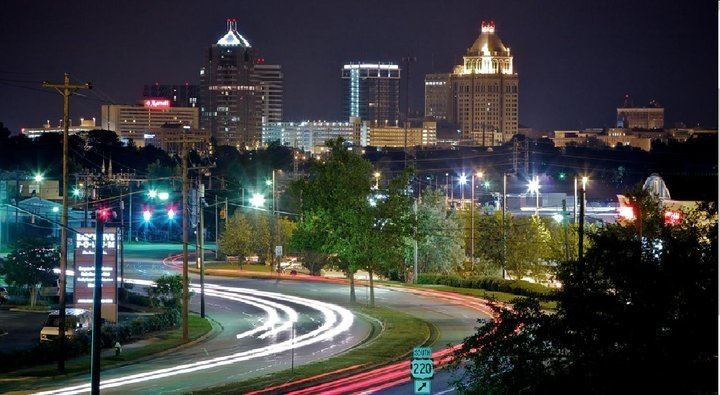
Greensboro skyline

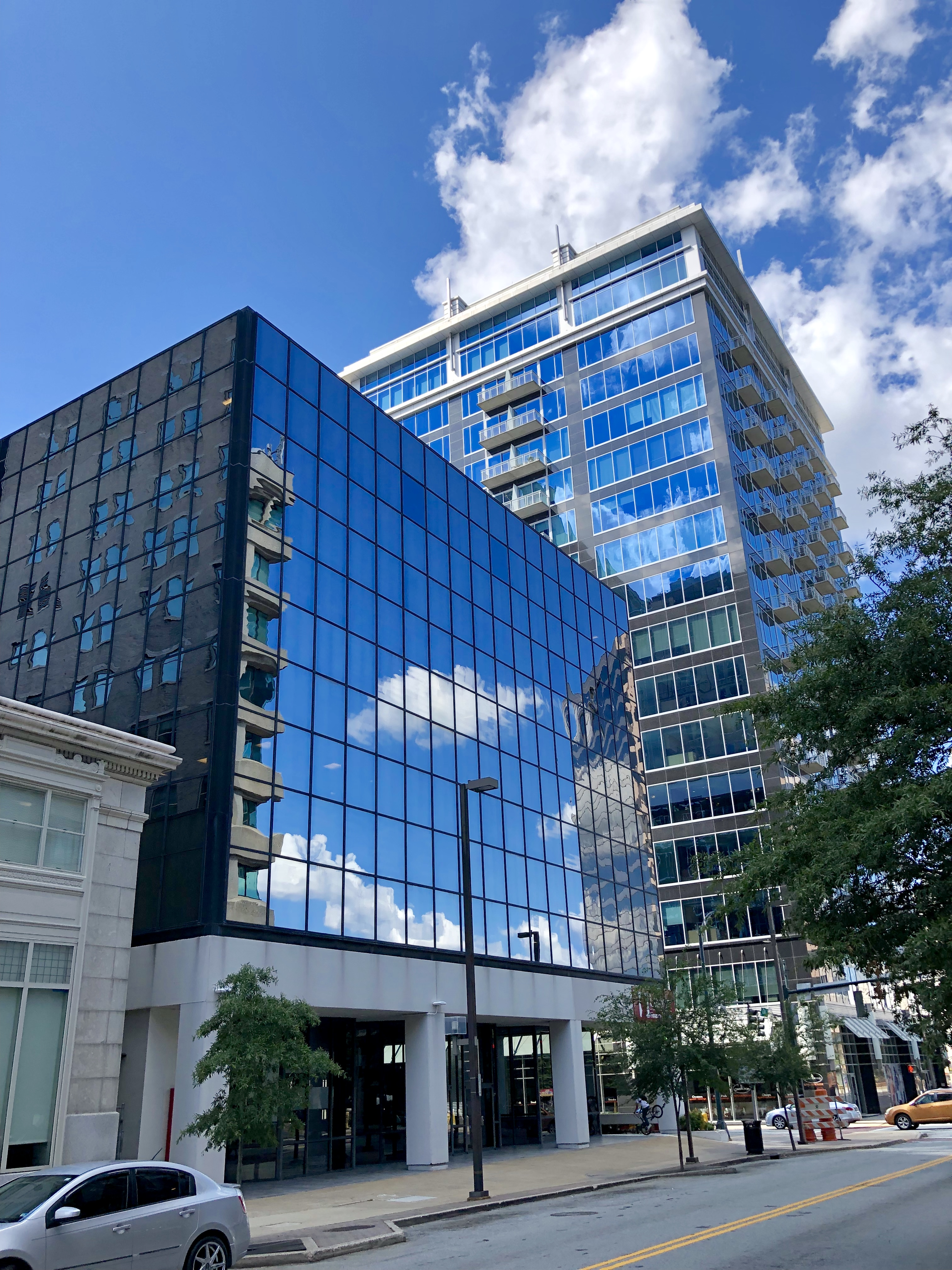
Elm Street in downtown Greensboro, 2019

Downtown Greensboro has attracted development investment in recent years with such new construction as First National Bank Field, residential construction, and offices. The Southside neighborhood downtown exemplifies central-city reinvestment. The formerly economically depressed neighborhood has been redeveloped as an award-winning neotraditional-style neighborhood featuring walkability, compact blocks and local amenities and services.

The redevelopment of the downtown was stimulated by the 2006 opening of the Elon University School of Law. The law school is credited with attracting student dollars to the downtown.

==== Four Seasons/Coliseum area ====
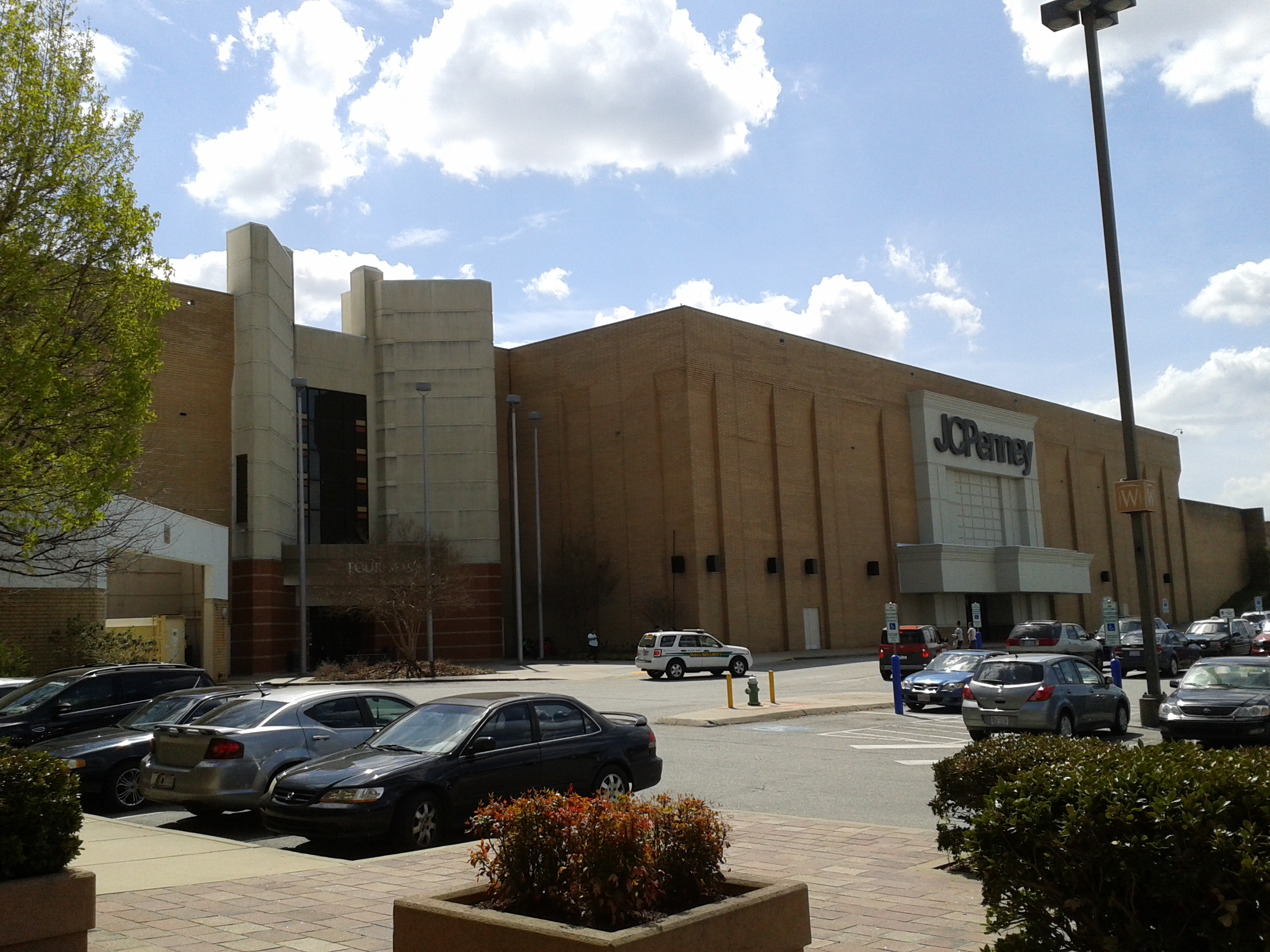
Four Seasons Town Centre

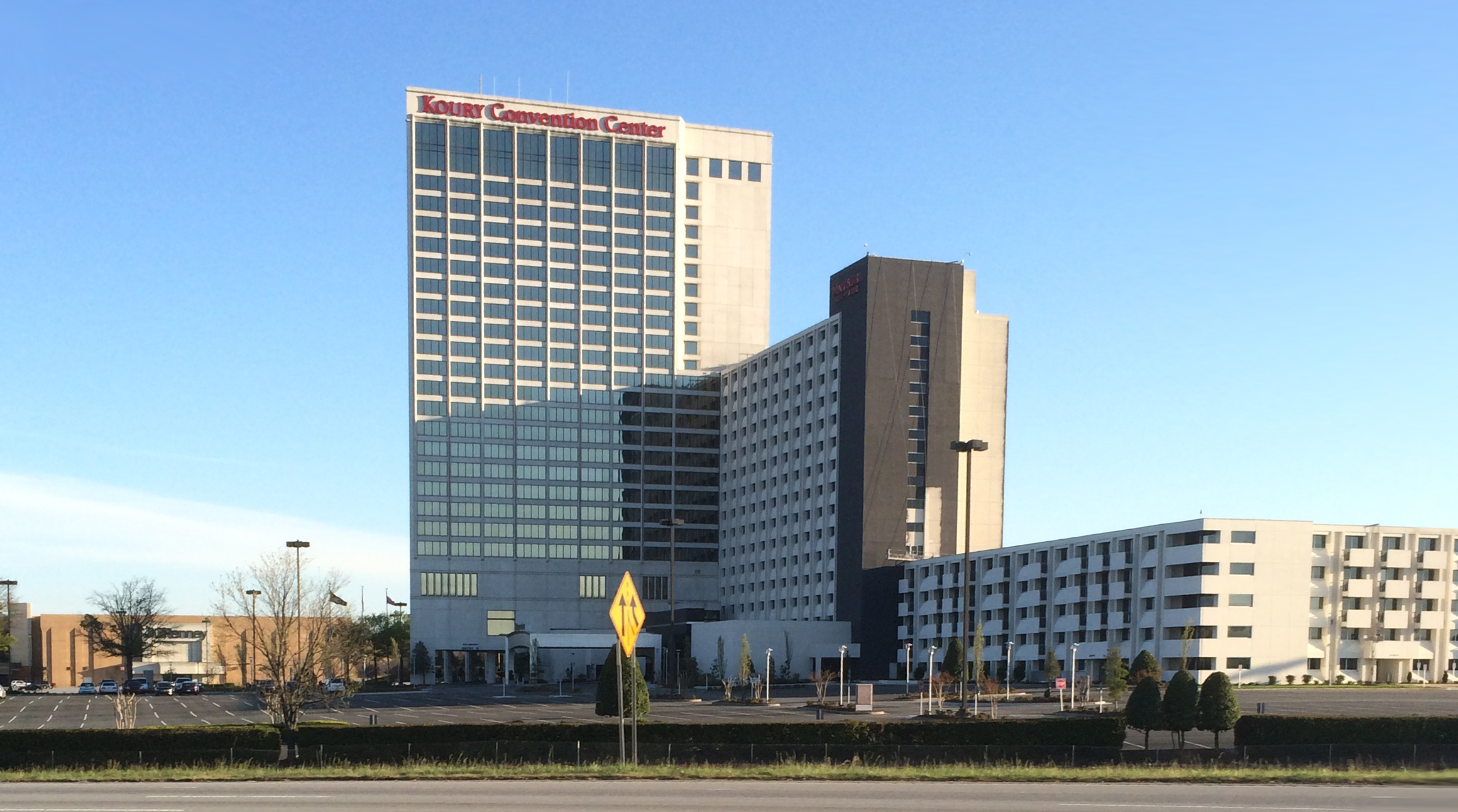
Sheraton Four Seasons – Joseph S. Koury Convention Center

The Four Seasons Town Centre, at 410 Four Seasons Town Centre, is a three-story shopping mall with 1,141,000 square feet (106,000 m^{2}) of shopping space developed by the Koury Corporation. It is adjacent to the Joseph S. Koury Convention Center and Sheraton Hotel. With over 250,000 square feet (23,000 m^{2}) of flexible meeting space, the Koury Convention Center is the largest convention center in the Southeast between Atlanta and Washington, D.C. The hotel has more than 1,000 rooms.

The Greensboro Coliseum is at 1921 W. Gate City Boulevard. This multipurpose complex consists of the 22,000-seat Greensboro Coliseum, the 300-seat Odeon Theatre, and the 167,000-square-foot (15,500 m^{2}) Special Events Center, which includes three exhibition halls, a 4,500-seat mini-arena, and eight meeting rooms. The 30,000-square-foot (2,800 m^{2}) Pavilion is adjacent. The complex hosts "a broad range of activities, including athletic events, cultural arts, concerts, theater, educational activities, fairs, exhibits, and public and private events of all kinds including conventions, convocations and trade and consumer shows". The Greensboro Aquatic Center, which hosts national swimming and diving events, is also in this complex.

==== Triad Airport area ====
In 1998, FedEx built a $300 million mid-Atlantic air-cargo and sorting hub at Piedmont Triad International Airport, after an intensive competition for the hub among other regions of the state, as well as locations in South Carolina. The project was challenged in court based on the quality of planned noise and pollution abatements from neighborhoods near the site. The hub opened in 2009. Originally projected by FedEx to employ 750 people in its first two years of operation and eventually 1,500, local FedEx employment has been nearly the same as before the facility was constructed.

In March 2015, HondaJet, with a manufacturing facility in Greensboro, announced that it had received provisional type certification (PTC) from the United States Federal Aviation Administration (FAA). This achievement indicates the FAA's approval of the HondaJet design based on certification testing, design reviews, and analyses completed to date.

In 2022, construction began on the Boom Supersonic factory at the airport and it was completed in June 2024. The site will be used as a final assembly line and test site for its supersonic passenger aircraft, Overture.

=== Climate ===
Like much of the southeastern United States, Greensboro has a humid subtropical climate (Köppen Cfa), with four distinct seasons. Winters are short and generally cool, with a January daily average of 38.9 °F (3.8 °C). On average, there are 75 nights per year that drop to or below freezing, (Note: The normal window for freezing temperatures is November 2 thru April 4.) and 4.3 days that fail to rise above freezing. (Note: Occasionally this never occurs in an entire winter or even calendar year; the last such occurrence was the winter of 2011–12 and 2012, respectively.) Measurable snowfall occurs nearly every winter, and accumulates to 7.5 inches (19.1 cm) on average, usually in January and February and occasionally December and March; the amount varies considerably from winter to winter. (Note: Seasonal snowfall accumulation has ranged from 32.5 in (82.6 cm) in the winter of 1926–27 to zero in the following winter (1927–28). A trace of snow was recorded as recently as the winter of 1991–92.) Cold-air damming (CAD) can facilitate freezing rain, often making it a more pressing concern than snow. Summers are hot and humid, with a daily average in July of 78.5 °F (25.8 °C). On average, 32 days per year have highs at or above 90 °F (32 °C), but, as in much of the Piedmont South, 100 °F (38 °C)+ readings are uncommon. Autumn is similar to spring in temperature but has fewer days of rainfall and less total rainfall. Extremes in temperature have ranged from −8 °F (−22 °C) on January 21, 1985, to 104 °F (40 °C), on June 12, 1911, June 12, 1914, and July 17, 1914.

Thunderstorms are common during the humid spring and summer months, some severe. On April 2, 1936, around 7:00 pm, a large, F-4 tornado cut a seven-mile (11-km) swath of destruction through southern Greensboro. 14 people were killed and 144 injured by the tornado, which moved through part of downtown. The storm was part of the 1936 Cordele-Greensboro tornado outbreak. Strong tornadoes have struck the Greensboro area since then, notably Stoneville on March 20, 1998; Clemmons and Winston-Salem on May 5, 1989; Clemmons and Greensboro on May 7, 2008; High Point on March 28, 2010; and Greensboro on April 15, 2018.

Climate data for Greensboro, North Carolina (Piedmont Triad Int'l), 1991–2020 normals, (Note: Mean monthly maxima and minima (i.e. the expected highest and lowest temperature readings at any point during the year or given month) calculated based on data at said location from 1991 to 2020.) extremes 1903–present (Note: Official records for Greensboro have been kept since January 1903; Piedmont Triad Int'l was made the official climatology station in November 1928. For more information, see Threadex.)
Month	Jan	Feb	Mar	Apr	May	Jun	Jul	Aug	Sep	Oct	Nov	Dec	Year
Record high °F (°C)	79 (26)	81 (27)	93 (34)	95 (35)	100 (38)	104 (40)	104 (40)	103 (39)	101 (38)	95 (35)	85 (29)	78 (26)	104 (40)
Mean maximum °F (°C)	69 (21)	72 (22)	80 (27)	85 (29)	89 (32)	94 (34)	96 (36)	94 (34)	91 (33)	85 (29)	76 (24)	70 (21)	97 (36)
Mean daily maximum °F (°C)	49.3 (9.6)	53.3 (11.8)	61.3 (16.3)	71.0 (21.7)	78.0 (25.6)	85.2 (29.6)	88.5 (31.4)	86.6 (30.3)	80.4 (26.9)	71.0 (21.7)	60.6 (15.9)	52.0 (11.1)	69.8 (21.0)
Daily mean °F (°C)	39.7 (4.3)	43.0 (6.1)	50.3 (10.2)	59.4 (15.2)	67.5 (19.7)	75.3 (24.1)	78.9 (26.1)	77.3 (25.2)	71.0 (21.7)	60.2 (15.7)	49.7 (9.8)	42.5 (5.8)	59.6 (15.3)
Mean daily minimum °F (°C)	30.1 (−1.1)	32.7 (0.4)	39.3 (4.1)	47.9 (8.8)	57.1 (13.9)	65.4 (18.6)	69.3 (20.7)	68.0 (20.0)	61.5 (16.4)	49.4 (9.7)	38.9 (3.8)	33.0 (0.6)	49.4 (9.7)
Mean minimum °F (°C)	13 (−11)	18 (−8)	22 (−6)	32 (0)	43 (6)	54 (12)	61 (16)	60 (16)	49 (9)	34 (1)	24 (−4)	19 (−7)	11 (−12)
Record low °F (°C)	−8 (−22)	−4 (−20)	5 (−15)	20 (−7)	32 (0)	42 (6)	48 (9)	45 (7)	35 (2)	20 (−7)	10 (−12)	−1 (−18)	−8 (−22)
Average precipitation inches (mm)	3.39 (86)	2.81 (71)	3.72 (94)	3.78 (96)	3.49 (89)	4.09 (104)	4.18 (106)	4.36 (111)	4.59 (117)	3.10 (79)	3.27 (83)	3.17 (81)	43.95 (1,116)
Average snowfall inches (cm)	2.9 (7.4)	2.0 (5.1)	0.9 (2.3)	0.0 (0.0)	0.0 (0.0)	0.0 (0.0)	0.0 (0.0)	0.0 (0.0)	0.0 (0.0)	0.0 (0.0)	0.1 (0.25)	1.2 (3.0)	7.1 (18)
Average precipitation days (≥ 0.01 in)	9.8	9.5	10.9	9.7	10.8	10.6	11.3	10.2	8.3	7.5	8.2	9.2	116.0
Average snowy days (≥ 0.1 in)	1.3	1.4	0.5	0.0	0.0	0.0	0.0	0.0	0.0	0.0	0.1	0.6	3.9
Average relative humidity (%)	67.4	64.0	62.7	60.9	69.8	72.7	75.4	76.4	75.9	72.2	68.5	68.5	69.5
Mean monthly sunshine hours	169.6	174.5	228.6	246.1	261.9	270.3	270.1	249.3	223.9	218.6	174.7	163.3	2,650.9
Percentage possible sunshine	55	57	62	63	60	62	61	59	60	63	57	54	60
Source: NOAA (relative humidity and sun 1961–1990)

Climate data for Greensboro WTP, NC (1991–2020 normals)
Month	Jan	Feb	Mar	Apr	May	Jun	Jul	Aug	Sep	Oct	Nov	Dec	Year
Record high °F (°C)	80 (27)	82 (28)	86 (30)	92 (33)	96 (36)	104 (40)	104 (40)	102 (39)	101 (38)	95 (35)	88 (31)	79 (26)	104 (40)
Mean maximum °F (°C)	68.4 (20.2)	71.5 (21.9)	80.1 (26.7)	85.6 (29.8)	89.5 (31.9)	93.7 (34.3)	96.3 (35.7)	95 (35)	90.5 (32.5)	84.9 (29.4)	77.2 (25.1)	69.5 (20.8)	97.4 (36.3)
Mean daily maximum °F (°C)	50.0 (10.0)	54.2 (12.3)	61.9 (16.6)	71.4 (21.9)	79.0 (26.1)	85.1 (29.5)	88.6 (31.4)	86.5 (30.3)	80.6 (27.0)	71.4 (21.9)	60.5 (15.8)	52.5 (11.4)	70.2 (21.2)
Daily mean °F (°C)	39.9 (4.4)	43.5 (6.4)	50.6 (10.3)	59.8 (15.4)	68.3 (20.2)	75.1 (23.9)	79.5 (26.4)	77.4 (25.2)	70.9 (21.6)	60.3 (15.7)	49.7 (9.8)	42.6 (5.9)	59.8 (15.4)
Mean daily minimum °F (°C)	29.8 (−1.2)	32.7 (0.4)	39.3 (4.1)	48.2 (9.0)	57.5 (14.2)	65.0 (18.3)	70.5 (21.4)	68.2 (20.1)	61.2 (16.2)	49.1 (9.5)	38.8 (3.8)	32.8 (0.4)	49.4 (9.7)
Mean minimum °F (°C)	12.6 (−10.8)	19.5 (−6.9)	24 (−4)	32.6 (0.3)	42.6 (5.9)	55.2 (12.9)	61.5 (16.4)	60.7 (15.9)	50.3 (10.2)	35.1 (1.7)	24.6 (−4.1)	19.7 (−6.8)	11.8 (−11.2)
Record low °F (°C)	−1 (−18)	3 (−16)	5 (−15)	22 (−6)	33 (1)	42 (6)	46 (8)	44 (7)	36 (2)	22 (−6)	11 (−12)	1 (−17)	−1 (−18)
Average precipitation inches (mm)	3.21 (82)	2.55 (65)	3.72 (94)	3.63 (92)	3.30 (84)	5.12 (130)	5.80 (147)	4.53 (115)	4.37 (111)	3.18 (81)	3.05 (77)	3.43 (87)	45.89 (1,166)
Average precipitation days (≥ 0.01 in)	8.7	9.1	9.6	8.5	10.4	9.9	8.7	10.5	8.2	7.3	7.8	9.4	108.1
Source: NOAA

== Demographics ==
Historical population
Census	Pop.	Note	%±
1870	497		—
1880	2,105		323.5%
1890	3,317		57.6%
1900	10,035		202.5%
1910	15,895		58.4%
1920	19,861		25.0%
1930	53,569		169.7%
1940	59,319		10.7%
1950	74,389		25.4%
1960	119,574		60.7%
1970	144,076		20.5%
1980	155,642		8.0%
1990	183,894		18.2%
2000	223,891		21.8%
2010	269,666		20.4%
2020	299,035		10.9%
2025 (est.)	308,667	▲	3.2%
U.S. Decennial Census

As of the 2020 census, there were 299,035 people, 118,046 households, and 69,420 families residing in the city. At the 2019 U.S. census estimates, there were 296,710 people living in the city, up from the 2019 American Community Survey's 291,303. At the 2010 U.S. census, there were 269,666 people; 111,731 households; and 63,244 families residing in the city. The population density was 2,131.7 people per square mile (823.1 people/km^{2}). There were 124,074 housing units at an average density of 980.8 per square mile (378.7/km^{2}).

Of the 124,074 households in the city in 2010, 30.1% included children under age 18, 35.5% were headed by married couples living together, 16.5% had a female householder with no husband present, and 43.4% were classified as non-family. Of the total households, 33.8% were composed of individuals, and 9.0% were someone living alone who was 65 or older. The average household size was 2.31, and the average family size was 3.00. In 2019, the average household size was 2.37.

The 2019 American Community Survey determined Greensboro had a median age of 35.1, up from 33.4 in 2010. Approximately 6.0% of the city's inhabitants were under 5; 78.2% of the population was 18 and older, and 13.7% 65 and older. The age distribution in 2010 was 22.7% under 18, 14.5% from 18 to 24, 28.2% from 25 to 44, 23.1% from 45 to 64, and 11.5% who 65 or older. The median age was 33.4. For every 100 females, there were 88.7 males, and for every 100 females 18 and over, there were 84.6 males.

In 2011–15, the estimated median annual income for a household was $41,628, and the median income for a family was $53,150. Male full-time workers had a median income of $40,143 versus $34,761 for females. The per capita income was $25,929. About 14.6% of families and 19.3% of the population were living below the poverty line, including 25.9% of those under 18 and 10.5% of those 65 or older. From 2015 to 2019, the median household income increased to $48,964 with a per capita of $29,628. The median earned income for males was $44,974 and $37,937 for females. An estimated 18.5% of Greensboro residents lived at or below the poverty line in 2019.

=== Race and ethnicity ===
Greensboro city, North Carolina – Racial and ethnic composition Note: the U.S. census treats Hispanic/Latino as an ethnic category. This table excludes Latinos from the racial categories and assigns them to a separate category. Hispanics/Latinos may be of any race.
Race / Ethnicity (NH = Non-Hispanic)	Pop 2000	Pop 2010	Pop 2020	% 2000	% 2010	% 2020
White alone (NH)	120,112	122,888	115,426	53.65%	45.57%	38.60%
Black or African American alone (NH)	83,041	108,233	123,853	37.09%	40.14%	41.42%
Native American or Alaska Native alone (NH)	920	1,096	985	0.41%	0.41%	0.33%
Asian alone (NH)	6,303	10,711	15,069	2.82%	3.97%	5.04%
Native Hawaiian or Pacific Islander alone (NH)	75	128	128	0.03%	0.05%	0.04%
Other race alone (NH)	487	703	1,534	0.22%	0.26%	0.51%
Mixed race or Multiracial (NH)	3,211	5,571	11,621	1.43%	2.07%	3.89%
Hispanic or Latino (any race)	9,742	20,336	30,419	4.35%	7.54%	10.17%
Total	223,891	269,666	299,035	100.00%	100.00%	100.00%

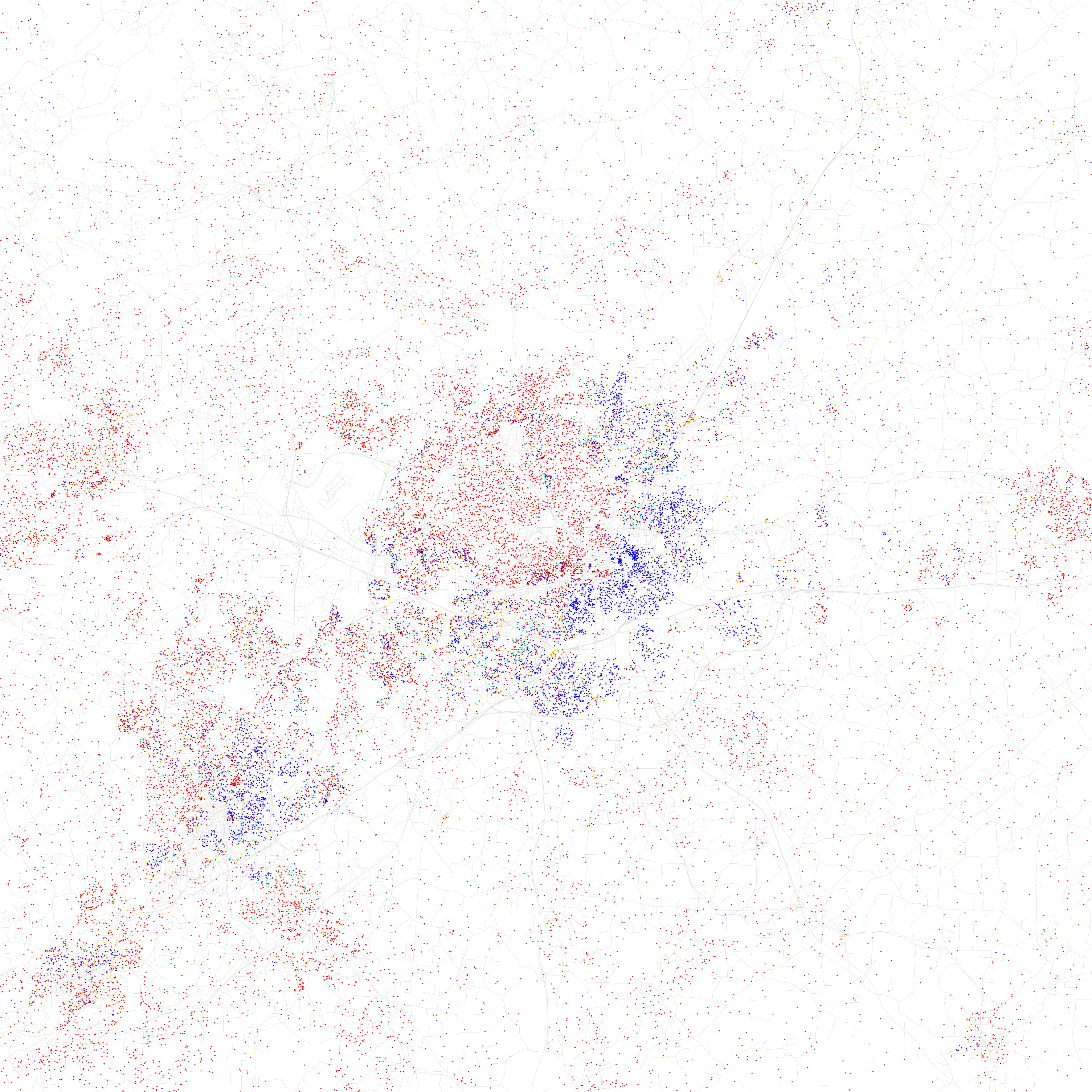
Map of racial distribution in Greensboro, 2010 U.S. census. Each dot is 25 people: ⬤ White ⬤ Black ⬤ Asian ⬤ Hispanic ⬤ Other

The racial composition of the city was 48.4% white, 40.6% Black or African American, 4.0% Asian American (1.6% Vietnamese, 0.7% Indian), 0.5% Native American, 0.1% Native Hawaiian or other Pacific Islander, 3.8% some other race, and 2.6% two or more races. Non-Hispanic whites were 45.6% of the population in 2010, compared to 70.9% in 1970. People of Hispanic or Latin American heritage, who may be of any race, in 2010 were 7.5% of the population (4.6% Mexican, 0.7% Puerto Rican).

In 2019, the racial and ethnic makeup of Greensboro was 47.3% non-Hispanic white, 41.4% black or African American, 0.5% Native American or Alaska Native, 5% Asian alone, 0.1% Native Hawaiian and other Pacific Islander, 2.7% from some other race, and 3.0% multiracial. Hispanics and Latin Americans of any race made up 7.9% of the local population. At the 2020 census, 41.42% of the population was black or African American, 38.6% non-Hispanic white, 0.33% Native American, 5.04% Asian, 0.04% Pacific Islander, 4.4% mixed or some other race, and 10.17% Hispanic or Latin American of any race. This reflected the national demographic shift and growth of nonwhite-identifying Americans.

=== Religion ===
In Greensboro, Sperling's BestPlaces determined that 48.33% of the population was religiously affiliated as of 2017. The largest religion in Greensboro is Christianity, with the most affiliates being either Baptist (11.85%) or Methodist (10.25%). The remaining Christian populations are Presbyterian (3.97%), Roman Catholic (3.71%), Pentecostal (2.61%), Episcopal (1.17%), Latter-Day Saints (1.02%), Lutheran (0.96%), and members of other Christian denominations (11.03%) including Greek Orthodox, Quaker, Moravian, Church of Christ, and non-denominational churches. After Christianity, the largest religion in Greensboro is Islam (0.82%), followed by Judaism (0.60%). Eastern religions such as Hinduism and Buddhism were the least common in Greensboro (0.34%).

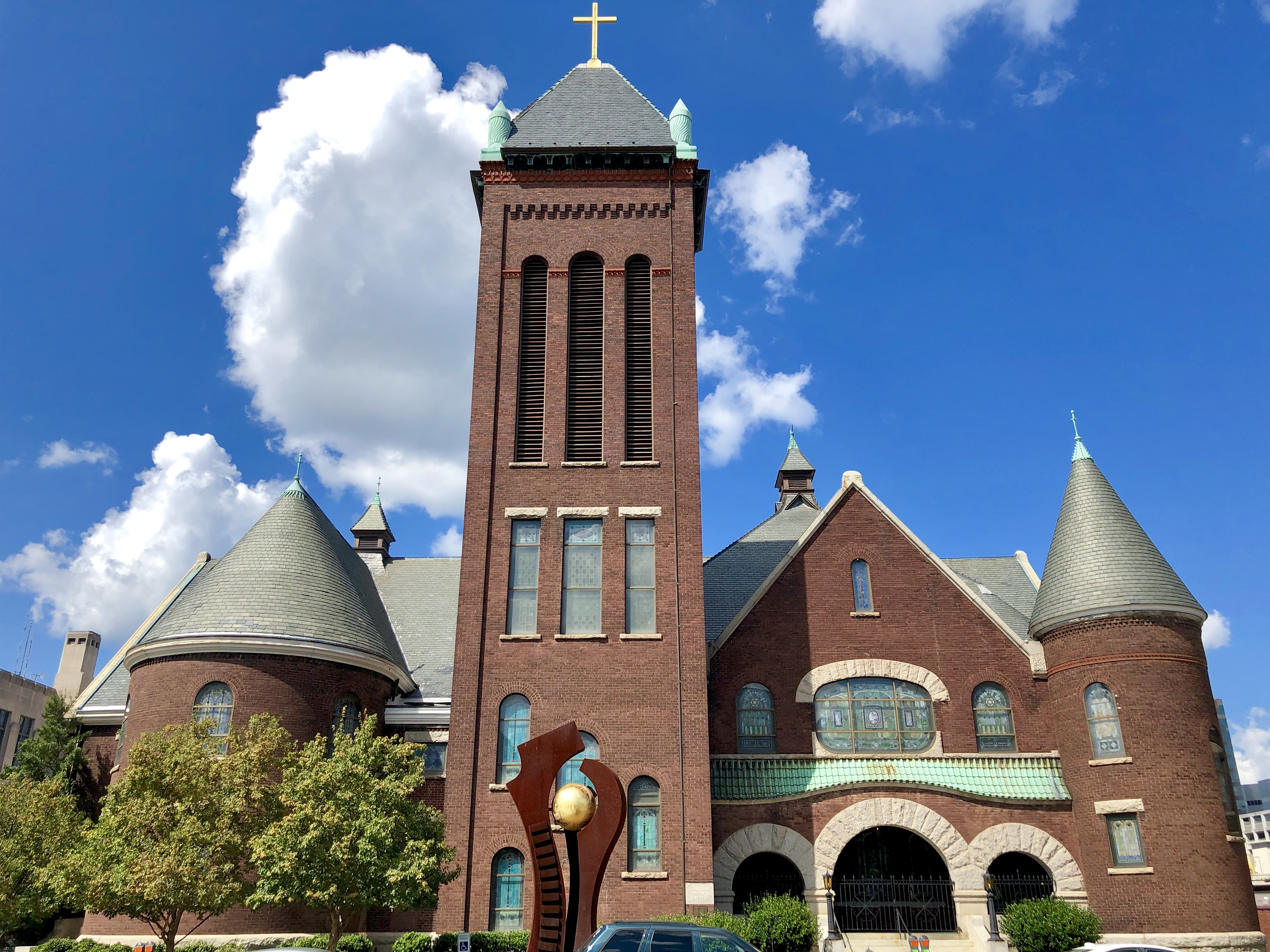
West Market Street United Methodist Church in downtown Greensboro.

In 2010, the Association of Religious Data Archives reported Protestantism was the largest form of Christianity practiced in the city and metropolitan area. Evangelical Protestantism dominated religious society alongside conservative, primarily African American churches. Most of the Baptist community were and continue to be dominated by the Southern Baptist Convention, National Baptist Convention (USA), American Baptist Churches USA, Progressive National Baptist Convention, and Full Gospel Baptist Church Fellowship. Methodists have been primarily divided among the United Methodist Church and African Methodist Episcopal Church. In the Presbyterian community, many affiliate with the Presbyterian Church (USA). Pentecostals have been divided among the Assemblies of God USA, Church of God in Christ, and Oneness Pentecostal denominations including the United Pentecostal Church International.

== Economy ==
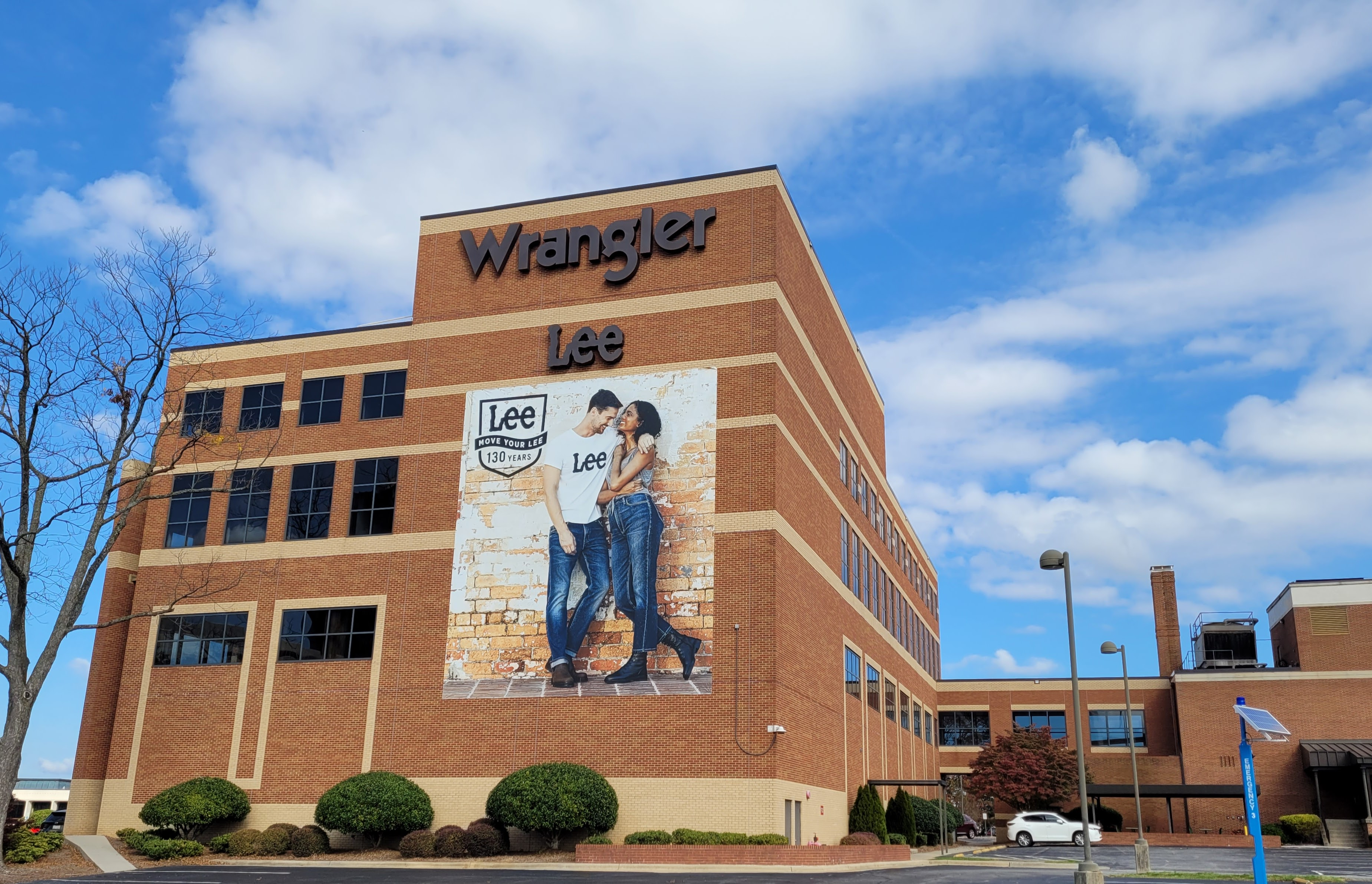
Wrangler headquarters

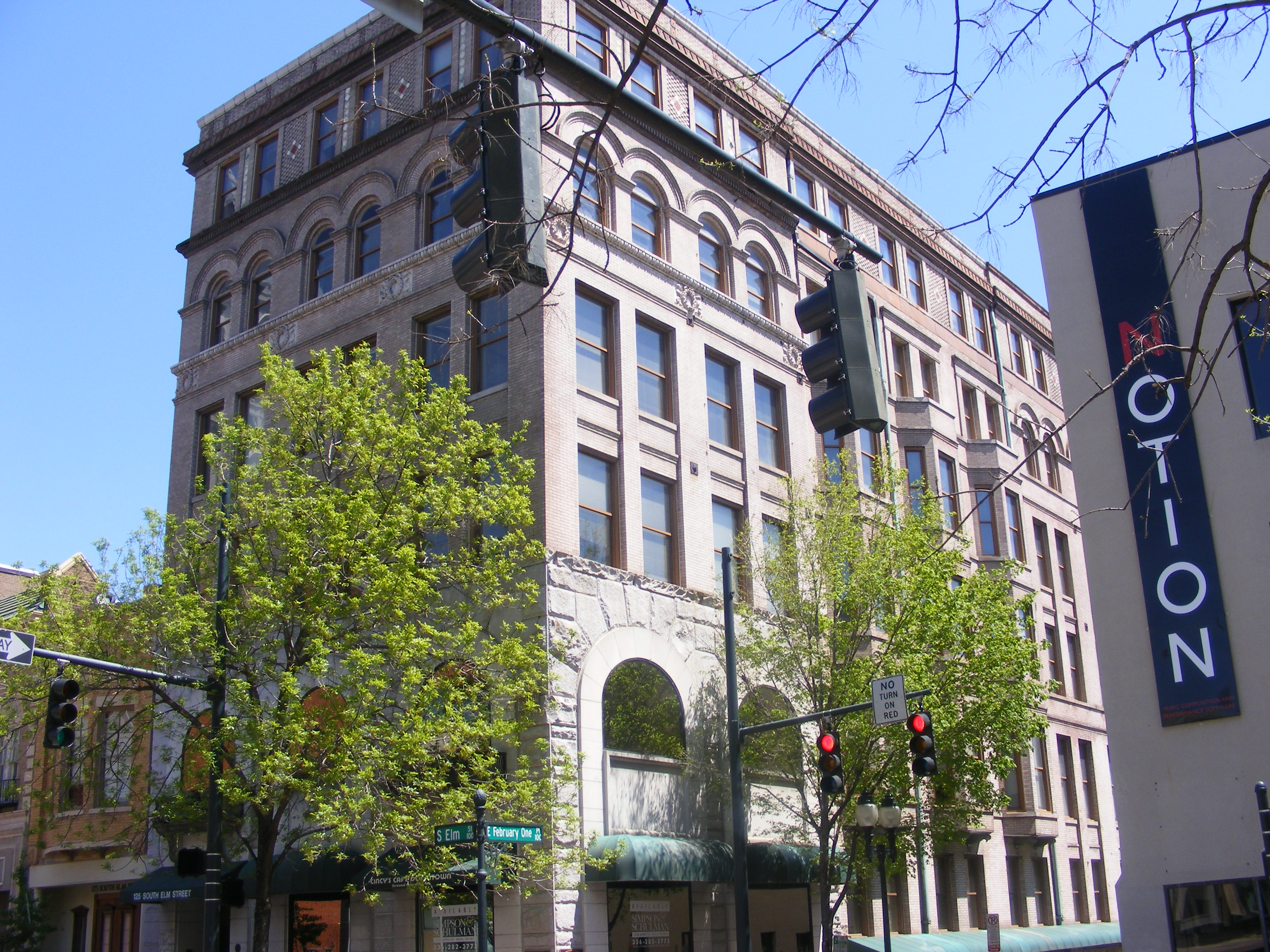
Dixie Building

The economy of Greensboro and the Piedmont Triad has traditionally centered around textiles, tobacco, and furniture. Greensboro's central location in the state has made it a popular place for families and businesses, as well as more of a logistics hub, with FedEx having regional operations based in the city. In December 2021, it was announced that Toyota Motor North America, a subsidiary of Japanese automaker Toyota, would operate a $1.3 billion battery plant in Greensboro.

Notable companies headquartered in Greensboro include the Honda Aircraft Company, HAECO Americas, ITG Brands, Kayser-Roth, Mack Trucks, Cone Health, Volvo Trucks of North America, Qorvo, the International Textile Group, The Fresh Market, Cook Out, Ham's, Biscuitville, Fusion3, Wrangler, Kontoor Brands and Columbia Forest Products. Greensboro is a "center of operations" for the insurance company Lincoln Financial Group.

City leaders have been working to attract new businesses in the nanotech, high-tech, aviation and transportation/logistics sectors. The University of North Carolina at Greensboro and North Carolina A&T State University opened a joint research park, Gateway University Research Park.

=== Largest employers ===
According to the city's 2025 Comprehensive Annual Financial Report, the largest employers in the city are:

#	Employer	Employees (2025)	Employees (2016)
1	Cone Health	13,000	11,386
2	Guilford County Schools	10,667	9,390
3	City of Greensboro	3,753	3,013
4	United States Postal Service	3,683	4,782
5	United Healthcare	3,040	2,063
6	Volvo Group	3,037	2,200
7	Guilford County	2,975	2,387
8	North Carolina A&T State University	2,307	2,865
9	University of North Carolina at Greensboro	1,957	2,608
10	Bank of America	1,679	NR
	Ralph Lauren	NR	2,853

=== Top industries ===
According to U.S. Bureau of Labor Statistics:

Industry	Jobs
Trade / transportation / utilities	73,800
Professional / business	54,400
Manufacturing	54,200
Education and health service	48,400
Government	42,600
Leisure and hospitality	36,700
Financial	18,200

== Arts ==
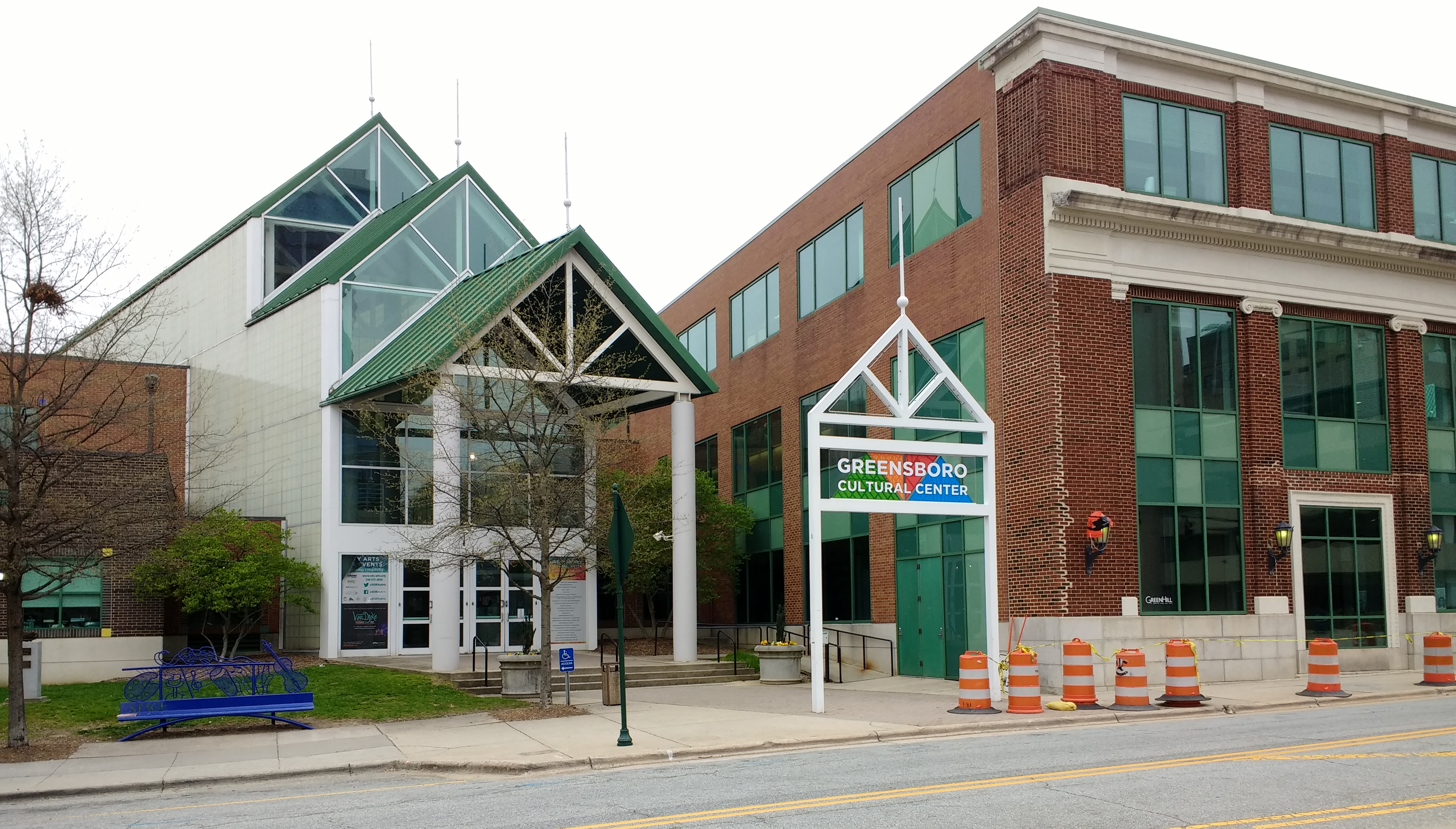
Greensboro Cultural Center

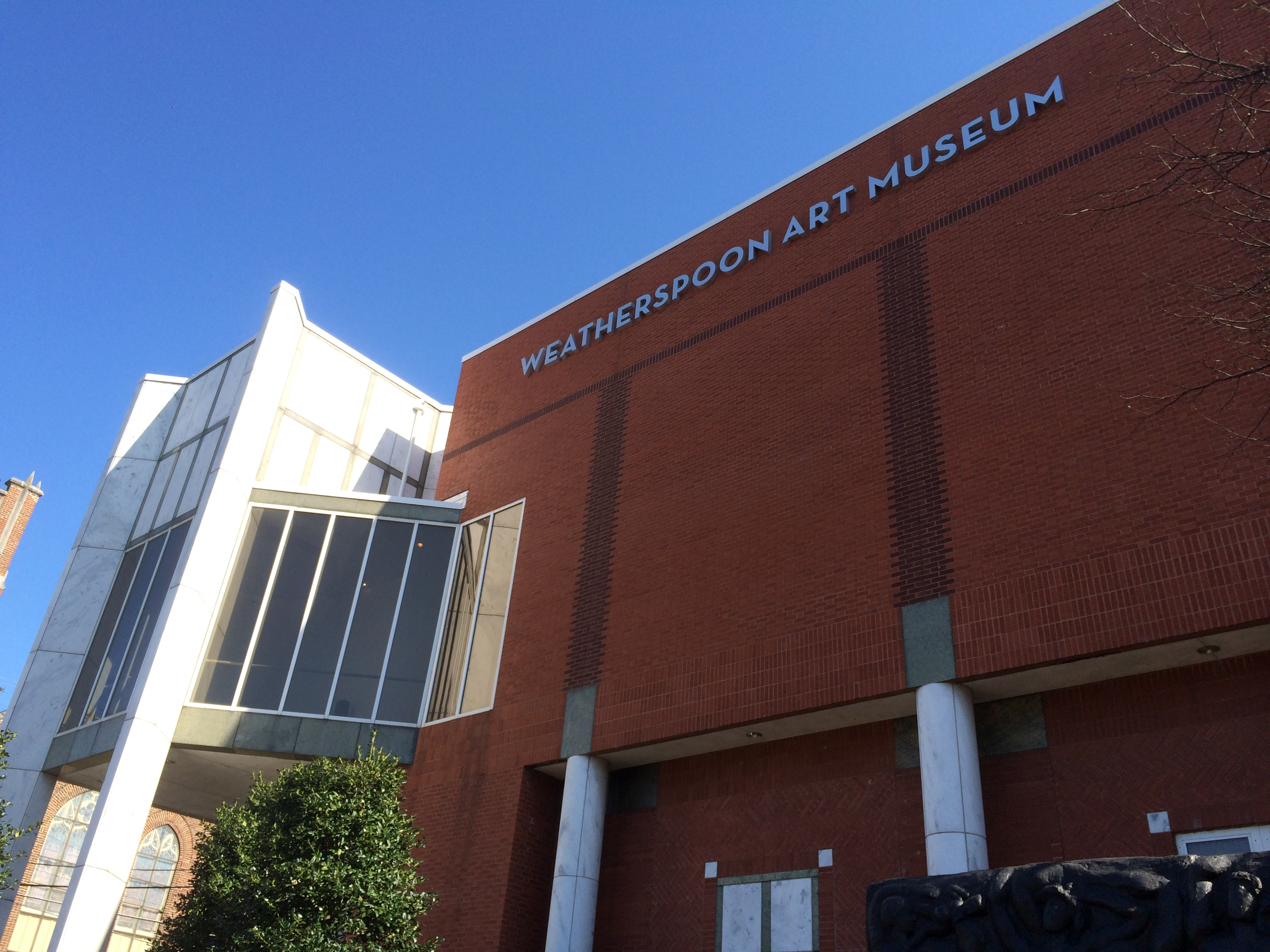
Weatherspoon Art Museum

Greensboro is home to an active and diverse arts community.

- The Carolina Theatre of Greensboro is a performing arts facility that has been a part of downtown Greensboro since 1927. Since the facility's renovation in the 1990s, the theater has served as the home of the Greensboro Ballet, the Community Theatre of Greensboro, the Livestock Players Musical Theatre, the Greensboro Youth Symphony, and a variety of other local performing arts groups.
- City Arts showcases a variety of musical and theatrical productions by the Livestock Players, the Drama Center, the Greensboro Children's Theatre, the Music Center, the Greensboro Concert Band, Philharmonia of Greensboro, the Choral Society of Greensboro, and the Greensboro Youth Chorus. Most of these groups participate in the city's annual OPUS Concert Series and the summer "Music for a Sunday Evening in the Park" series.
- The Community Theatre of Greensboro has presented Broadway and off-Broadway plays and musicals for more than 45 years. Its Studio Theatre is in the Greensboro Cultural Center.
- The Eastern Music Festival brings more than 100 summer performances, from symphonic works to chamber music to recitals by professional and talented students from around the world. The event also hosts the Fringe Festival, showcasing avant-garde and nontraditional music and performances.
- Elsewhere Collaborative is a living museum set inside a former thrift store on South Elm Street in downtown Greensboro. Elsewhere is an interactive, evolving environment of objects, creatives, and creations. The living museum hosts events, performances, projects, and productions that activate the 58-year collection and foster communications between creatives and participants.
- The Greater Triad Shag Club is a nonprofit club dedicated to the music and dance associated with Carolina shag. The Shag is recognized as the "North Carolina Popular Dance". The Greater Triad Shag Club meets monthly at Thirsty's 2 in Greensboro.
- Greensboro Ballet and School of Greensboro Ballet: A traditional December production of The Nutcracker is just one of the many artistic and educational activities offered by the ballet company. The School of Greensboro Ballet is one of a relative few nonprofit ballet schools in the nation.
- The Greensboro Cultural Center houses more than 25 visual and performing arts organizations, five art galleries, rehearsal halls, a sculpture garden, a privately operated restaurant with outdoor cafe-style seating, and an outdoor amphitheater. Art galleries include the African American Atelier, the Green Hill Center for North Carolina Art, the Greensboro Artists' League Gallery and Gift Shop, the Guilford Native American Art Gallery and the Mattye Reed African Heritage Center Satellite Gallery.
- The Greensboro Mural Project engages the community in a participatory arts process around social issues, allowing people throughout the community to help paint the city together.
- The Greensboro Opera Company is a regional opera company founded in October 1981 that has experienced much growth and expansion. Beginning with the production of Verdi's La traviata featuring June Anderson (then a rising young New York City Opera soprano), the company expanded from a single fall production of a major opera in the years 1981–89 to the addition of Sunday matinee performances in the 1998–99 season when, in response to successive sold-out productions of Madame Butterfly and Carmen in 1997 and 1998, a second spring opera with two performances was added, beginning in 1999–2000. The company has blended outside and local singers with a full orchestra, staffed by members of the Greensboro Symphony, in the pit at its home at Greensboro's War Memorial Auditorium.
- The Greensboro Symphony Orchestra, led by conductor Dmitry Sitkovetsky, has developed a strong reputation among national musical organizations, including continued exposure on National Public Radio's Performance Today. The orchestra performs classical and pops concerts and holds educational programs for young listeners throughout the year.
- The Mattye Reed African American Heritage Collection at North Carolina A&T State University hosts one of the nation's most acclaimed collections of African culture. It houses more than 3,500 art and craft pieces from more than 30 African nations, New Guinea and Haiti.
- Stagelights Theater Company is a youth performing arts program dedicated to helping children experience the joy of theatre, dance, and music. Pamela Kinter founded it in 2010. Students learn to express themselves in front of an audience, as well as the importance of teamwork and cooperation in creating a work of art. Stagelights holds many full-length musical theatre productions throughout the year, and also offers classes in the dramatic arts, dance, musical theatre, vocal education, and private instrument instruction.
- The Steven Tanger Center for the Performing Arts is a 3,023-seat performing arts facility that opened in November 2021. It is scheduled to host multiple Broadway productions in 2022, including Wicked, Hamilton,The Lion King, and Mean Girls.
- Triad Stage is a not-for-profit regional theatre company based in the downtown historic district. All productions are created in Greensboro using a combination of local and national talent. The theater company was recognized as "One of the 50 Best Regional Theatres in America!" by New York's Drama League, "Best Live Theatre" in Go Triad/News & Record The Rhino Times, and was voted "2003 Professional Theater of the Year" by the North Carolina Theatre Conference.
- The Weatherspoon Art Museum at the University of North Carolina at Greensboro houses one of the Southeast's foremost collections of modern and contemporary art. Comprising six galleries, it is nationally recognized for its collection of 20th-century American art. The permanent collection also includes lithographs and bronzes by Henri Matisse, and art by Willem de Kooning, Henry Ossawa Tanner, John Graham, Pablo Picasso, Robert Rauschenberg, and Andy Warhol.
- Weaver Academy is a high school for advanced artists and performers. Plays, musicals, art shows, and concerts can be regularly seen on its downtown campus. The school has many accomplished alumni, notably Isaac Cole Powell.

=== Attractions ===
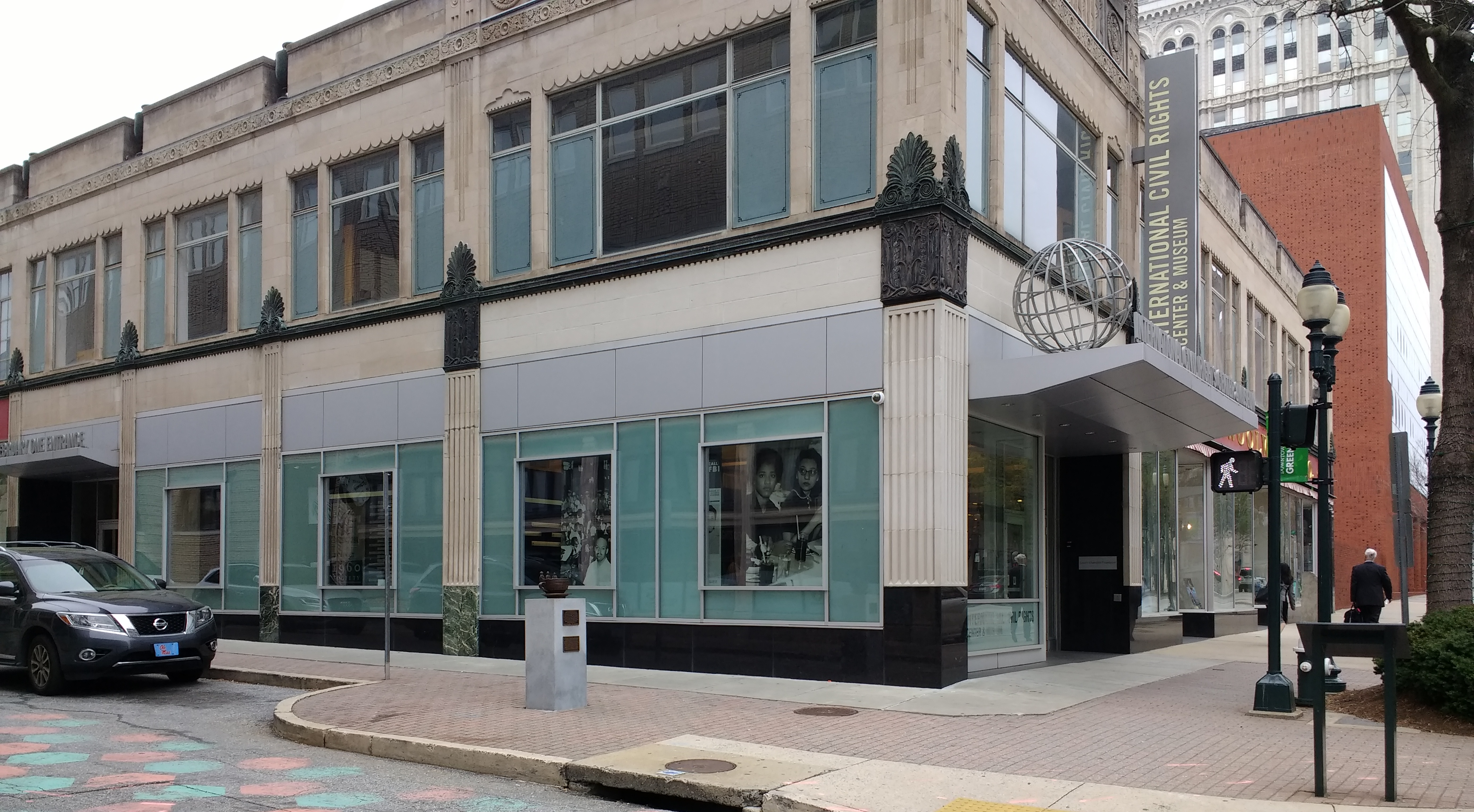
International Civil Rights Center and Museum

- Bicentennial Garden was developed in 1976 to commemorate the U.S. bicentennial. The garden contains 1.25 miles (2.01 km) of paved trails, along with outdoor sculptures and a pavilion. The park is across the street from The Bog Garden and also on Hobbs Road.
- Blandwood Mansion and Gardens is the historic home of former North Carolina Governor John Motley Morehead. Today it serves as a museum of national architectural and historical significance. It is the earliest example of Tuscan Italianate architecture in the nation, designed by New York architect Alexander Jackson Davis.
- The Bog Garden is accessed by an elevated boardwalk that comprises a half-mile of the 1.06 miles (1.71 km) of trails that wind through a garden of plants and wildlife that thrive in a wetland ecosystem. It is off Hobbs Road.
- Carolyn & Maurice LeBauer Park opened downtown in 2016 next to the library and the Greensboro Historical Museum.
- The revitalized downtown Elm Street area is known for its collection of antique shops, art galleries, and restaurants and clubs. Many people attend the First Friday events held each month at participating merchants.
- First National Bank Field is the home of the Greensboro Grasshoppers baseball club. Completed in 2005, it hosts additional outdoor events and concerts during the summer months.
- Green Hill Cemetery, Greensboro's oldest public cemetery, occupies 51 acres adjacent to downtown. Green Hill remains an active cemetery for burials, but visitors may walk or drive through it.
- Greensboro offers and is well known for over 70 miles of hiking trails, including around the lakes, Guilford Military Park, and downtown. Many allow biking also, including Owl's Roost Trail, one of North Carolina's best biking trails.
- The Greensboro Arboretum was completed as a partnership between Greensboro Beautiful and the City of Greensboro Parks & Recreation Department. It offers an extensive selection of flora for study and enjoyment. The 17-acre (69,000 m^{2}) site features 12 permanent plant collections as well as special display gardens with a fountain, overlook, arbor, gazebo, bridges, and viewing benches.
- Greensboro Center City Park occupies half a city block adjacent to the Greensboro Cultural Center. Sponsored by Action Greensboro, the park features a fountain as well as works by several North Carolina artists.
- The Greensboro Children's Museum (GCM) offers hands-on and interactive exhibits, educational programming, and special events all year long for children newborn through age ten.
- The Greensboro Coliseum Complex was conceived, and continues to operate, as a multibuilding facility to serve citizens of Greensboro and the surrounding region by hosting a broad range of activities including athletic and cultural events; concerts, theater and other entertainment; educational activities, fairs and exhibits; and other public and private events such as conventions, convocations and trade/consumer shows. The coliseum complex has hosted prestigious events such as the collegiate Atlantic Coast Conference (ACC) basketball tournament, East Coast Hockey League (ECHL) and American Hockey League (AHL) professional hockey, the NCAA men's basketball championship and Starrcade (1983). The Carolina Hurricanes of the National Hockey League also called the Greensboro Coliseum their temporary home while their permanent venue was being constructed in Raleigh. Since 1959, the coliseum has featured superstars ranging from Elvis Presley to Usher. The facility again hosted ACC basketball tournaments (men's and women's) in 2010 and the 2011 and 2015 U.S. Figure Skating Championships. The complex has undergone several major renovations, most recently in 1994, enlarging the maximum arena capacity to 23,500 seats. The ACC Hall of Champions and Museum opened adjacent to the coliseum complex in March 2011, as the ACC was founded in Greensboro in 1953 and was headquartered at the Grandover Office Park in south Greensboro.
- The Greensboro Science Center is a family-oriented, hands-on science museum and planetarium. The zoo reopened in summer 2007 after extensive renovations.
- Guilford Courthouse National Military Park commemorates the Battle of Guilford Court House, which occurred there on March 15, 1781. The battle opened the campaign that led to America's victory in the Revolutionary War. The British lost a substantial number of troops in the battle, which factored in their surrender at Yorktown seven months later. The battle site remains largely undeveloped, with large stone memorials erected early in the 20th century to memorialize the event.
- Hagan Stone Park is a scenic 409-acre (1.66 km^{2}) wildlife refuge and family campground owned and operated by the city of Greensboro, on Hagan Stone Park Road off U.S. Highway 421. It is open daily 8 am to sunset, weather permitting. The park has several lakes, camp shelters with charcoal grills, and playgrounds. The park is the home of the Greensboro Invitational Cross Country Meet hosted annually in September by the Greensboro Pacesetters for high school and college athletes.
- The International Civil Rights Center and Museum, opened in 2010, is in the former F. W. Woolworth building in which the Greensboro sit-ins occurred. The museum was founded by the Sit-in Movement, Inc. to commemorate the sit-ins and persons involved, as well as other events in the history of the Civil Rights Movement.
- Wet 'n Wild Emerald Pointe has 36 rides, including Daredevil Drop, one of the nation's tallest water slides, and family rides such as Tropical Drop. The park features two heavily themed family sections: Splash Island and Happy Harbor. Emerald Pointe is the Carolinas' largest water park. According to Amusement Business magazine, Emerald Pointe has the tenth-highest annual attendance among American water parks, at nearly 500,000.
- Woods of Terror is a haunted theme park near Greensboro.
- World War Memorial Stadium was one of the nation's oldest continuously used professional baseball facilities before it was replaced by the city's First Horizon Stadium in 2005. The stadium was constructed in 1926 to honor the lives lost during World War I. It anchors the Aycock Historic District and remains in use by collegiate baseball teams, amateur leagues, and other special events throughout the year. The stadium was home to the Greensboro Bats professional minor-league club until the First Horizon Park opened and the team became the Greensboro Grasshoppers.

=== Retail ===
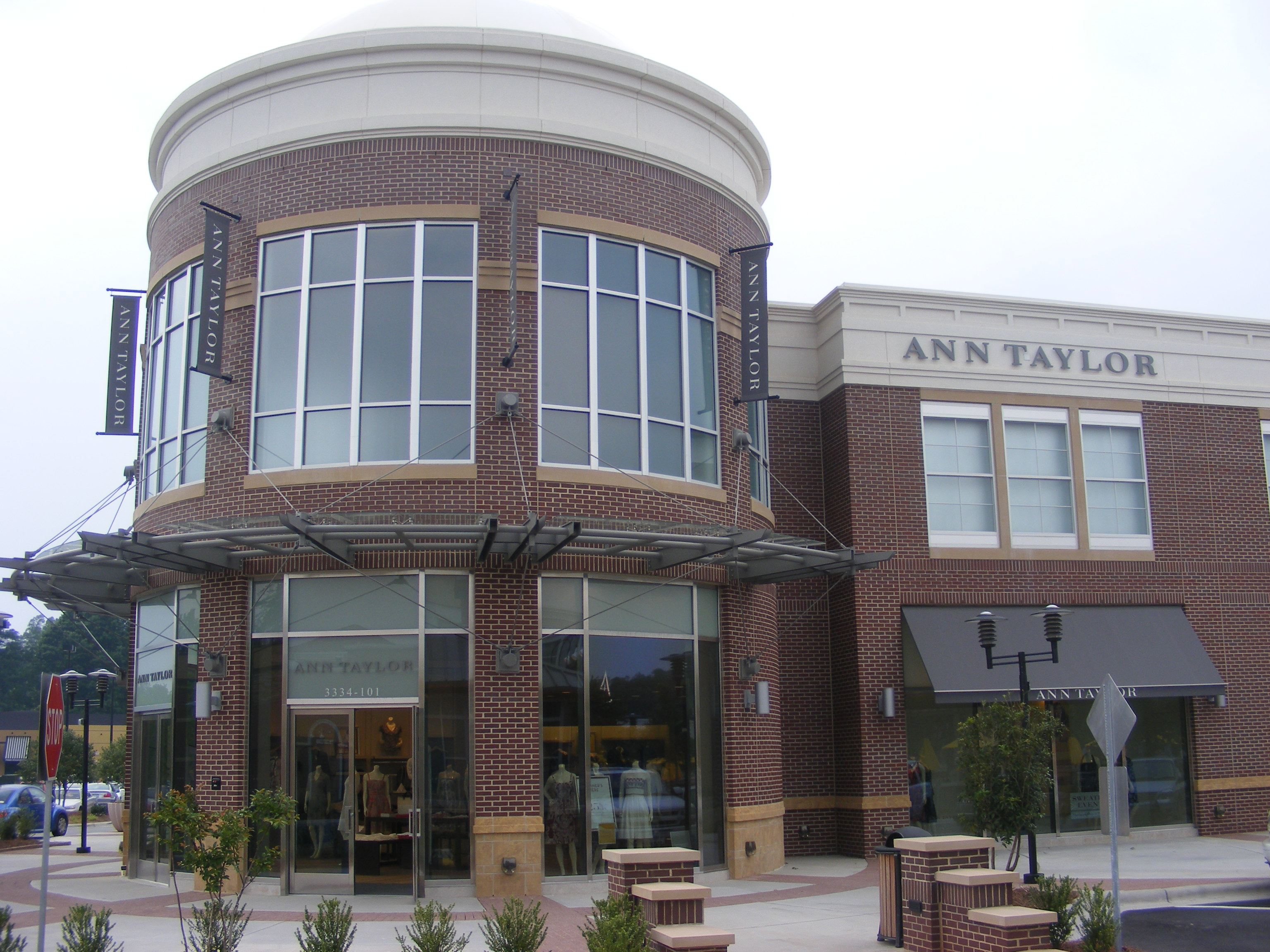
The Shops at Friendly Center

Greensboro is home to a variety of retail shopping, from well-known national chains to local boutiques and galleries. Four Seasons Town Centre off of I-40, being of three-levels and enclosed. Friendly Center, off Friendly Avenue, is an open-air shopping complex featuring one of the largest Harris Teeter supermarkets, and a multiplex cinema. The Shoppes at Friendly Center, adjacent to Friendly Center, is home to notable upscale retailers and restaurants. Around the corner on Market street is Fanta City International Mall, a mini-mall dedicated to foreign exchange. This is a broad international supercenter combined with a flea market, offering European and East Asian specialties. Traditional shopping centers are primarily found on the West Wendover corridor near I-40 and on Battleground Avenue on the city's northwest side. Big-box retailers have clustered at the site of the former Carolina Circle Mall on the city's northeast side and far south along the Urban Loop (I-85, I-73). On New Garden Road, are surrounding retail, mostly near the Bryan Blvd interchange.

== Sports ==
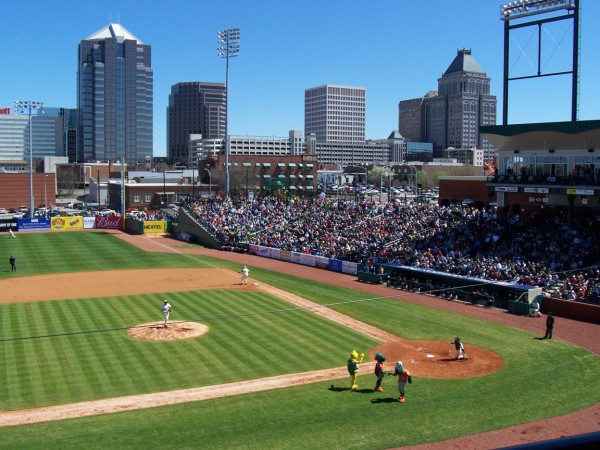
First National Bank Field, home of the Greensboro Grasshoppers, the High-A affiliate of the Pittsburgh Pirates

Greensboro is not home to any top-level professional sports teams. The National Hockey League's Carolina Hurricanes moved to Raleigh from Hartford, Connecticut in 1997, but the team played its first two seasons at the Greensboro Coliseum Complex while its home arena, Raleigh's Lenovo Center, was under construction. During the late 1990s, the Minnesota Twins almost relocated to the city, even receiving league approval, but the deal collapsed after local voters refused to fund the proposed ballpark.

The Greensboro Grasshoppers (formerly the Greensboro Bats and the Greensboro Hornets) are a minor league baseball team in Greensboro. They are a Class High-A team in the South Atlantic League and a farm team for the Pittsburgh Pirates. The Grasshoppers play at First National Bank Field.

Greensboro's North Carolina Fusion U23 play in the USL League Two, the nation's top level men's amateur soccer competition. It has 63 teams competing in four conferences, split into ten regional divisions. It is considered the fourth tier of competition, behind the United Soccer League. The team plays its home games at Macpherson Stadium in nearby Browns Summit, where it has played since 2003. PDL seasons take place during the summer, with the player pool drawn mainly from elite NCAA college soccer players seeking to continue playing high level soccer during their summer break, which they can do while still maintaining their college eligibility.

On October 27, 2015, the Charlotte Hornets officially announced that Greensboro would host an affiliate NBA Development League team, beating out other considered cities like Columbia, Asheville, Fayetteville, and Charleston. The Greensboro Swarm began playing in fall 2016 at the Greensboro Coliseum Fieldhouse.

Greensboro is home to two universities that participate in NCAA Division I Athletics: North Carolina A&T Aggies of North Carolina Agricultural and Technical State University, as well as UNC Greensboro Spartans of the University of North Carolina Greensboro. The Aggies compete in both Coastal Athletic Association and MEAC conferences, while the Spartans compete in the Southern Conference. Both Greensboro College and Guilford College participates at the NCAA Division III level.

Greensboro was home to the headquarters of the Atlantic Coast Conference, despite having no school in the league. The Greensboro Coliseum Complex has hosted the ACC men's basketball tournament 23 times since 1967 and the ACC women's basketball tournament 12 times since 2000. Greensboro has also hosted the NCAA Men's Basketball Regionals three times, and the Final Four once.

The PGA Tour holds a tournament annually in Greensboro. The Wyndham Championship is held at Sedgefield Country Club and is the last PGA Tour event before the Playoffs for the FedEx Cup. The tournament was founded in 1938 as the Greater Greensboro Open and one of the oldest events on the PGA Tour.

Greensboro nicknames itself "Tournament Town" due to the many sports tournaments it hosts. In addition to the ACC basketball tournament and NCAA basketball games, the city has hosted the ACC baseball tournament, the 2011 U.S. Figure Skating Championships and a number of national competitions at the new Greensboro Aquatic Center. In 1974 Greensboro hosted the NCAA Men's Basketball Final Four championship game. It was the first time the Final Four was held in North Carolina.

Greensboro Roller Derby was founded in 2010 and has been a member of the WFTDA, Women's Flat Track Derby Association, since 2013. The league comprises three intraleague teams, named after prominent streets in the city, as well as interleague all-star and b-level teams, each featuring skaters from the three intraleague teams. The league is run by the skaters, who all have ties to the community, and is a not-for-profit organization. Roller derby bouts are held at the Greensboro Coliseum from March to November.

Clubs	Sport	League	Stadium
Carolina Cobras	Indoor American football	National Arena League	First Horizon Coliseum
Greensboro Gargoyles	Ice hockey	East Coast Hockey League – North Division	First Horizon Coliseum
Greensboro Grasshoppers	Baseball	South Atlantic League – North Division	First National Bank Field
Greensboro Swarm	Basketball	NBA G League – Eastern Conference	Novant Health Fieldhouse
Carolina Cowboys	Rodeo	Professional Bull Riders	First Horizon Coliseum
Salem City FC	Soccer	USL League Two	Macpherson Stadium
North Carolina Fusion	Soccer	USL W League – South Atlantic Division	Macpherson Stadium
Greensboro Groove	Women's basketball	UpShot League	Novant Health Fieldhouse

== Government ==
Greensboro has a council–manager government with nine members; all seats, including the mayor's, are up for election every four years. Five of the council seats are district representatives and three are citywide representatives elected at-large.

As of February 2026, Marikay Abuzuaiter is the mayor. Trey Davis is the city manager.

=== City Council ===
As of February 2026, members of the Greensboro City Council include:

- Marikay Abuzuaiter, mayor
- Denise Roth, mayor pro tem
- Irving Allen, at-large
- Hugh Holston, at-large
- Crystal Black, district 1
- Cecile "CC" Crawford, district 2
- April Parker, district 3
- Adam Marshall, district 4
- Tammi Thurm, district 5

=== Participatory budgeting ===
Greensboro is the first city in the South to run a participatory budgeting (PB) process, whereby the city's residents decide how a portion of the city budget is spent. The first cycle was for $500,000, ran through April 2016, and was incorporated into the 2016–17 budget, with projects like murals, bridge improvements, and a citywide bus tracking app voted on by residents.

== Education ==
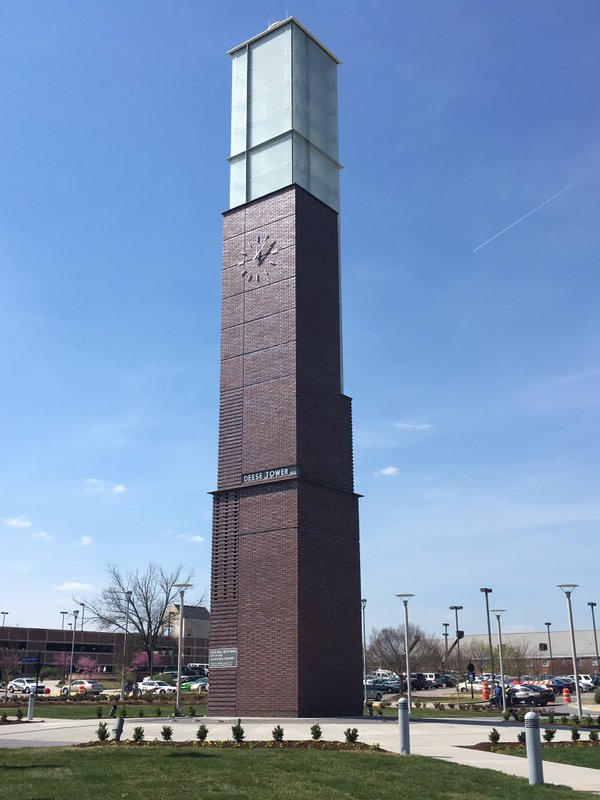
Deese Clock Tower at North Carolina A&T State University

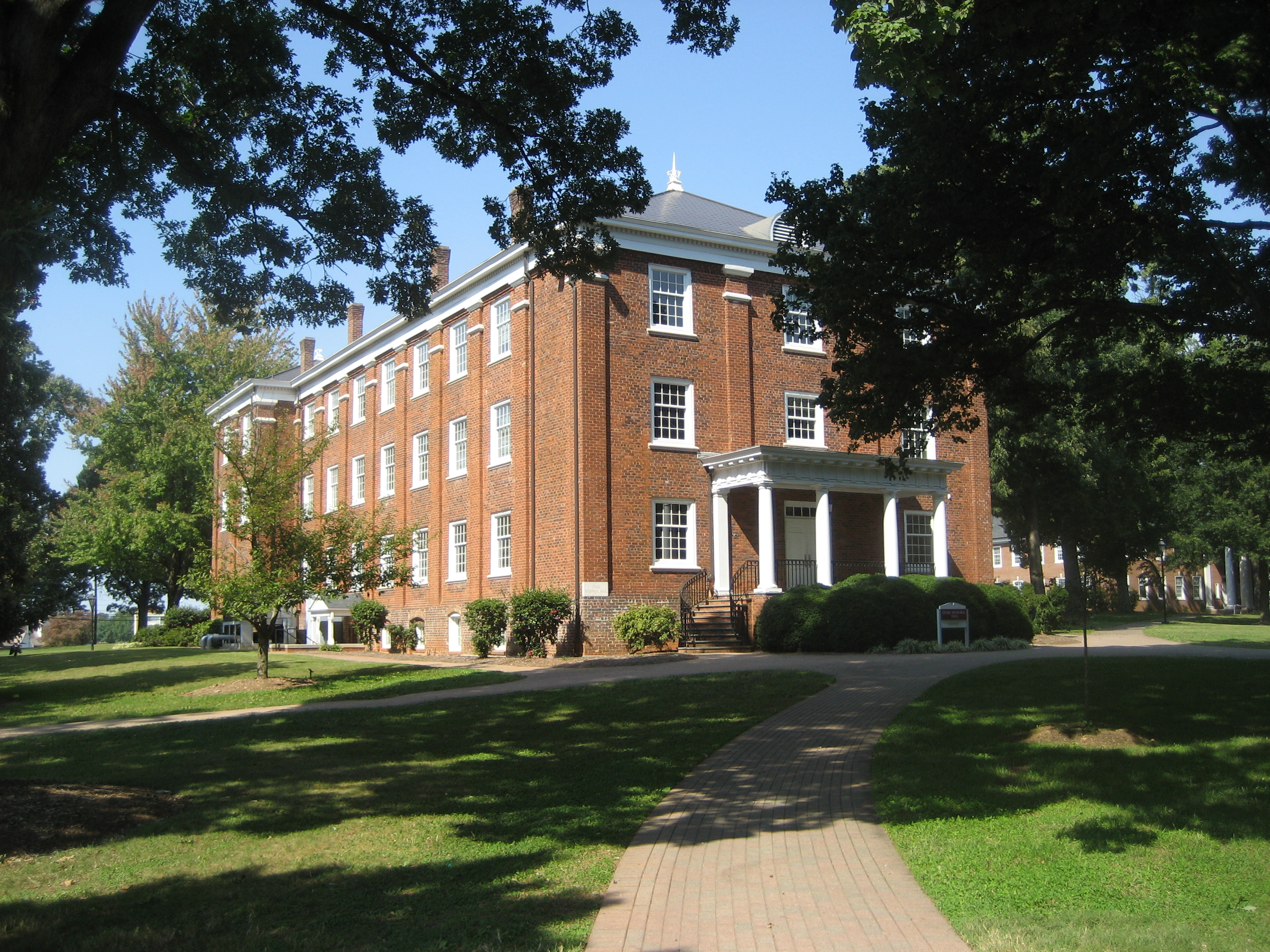
Duke Memorial Hall at Guilford College

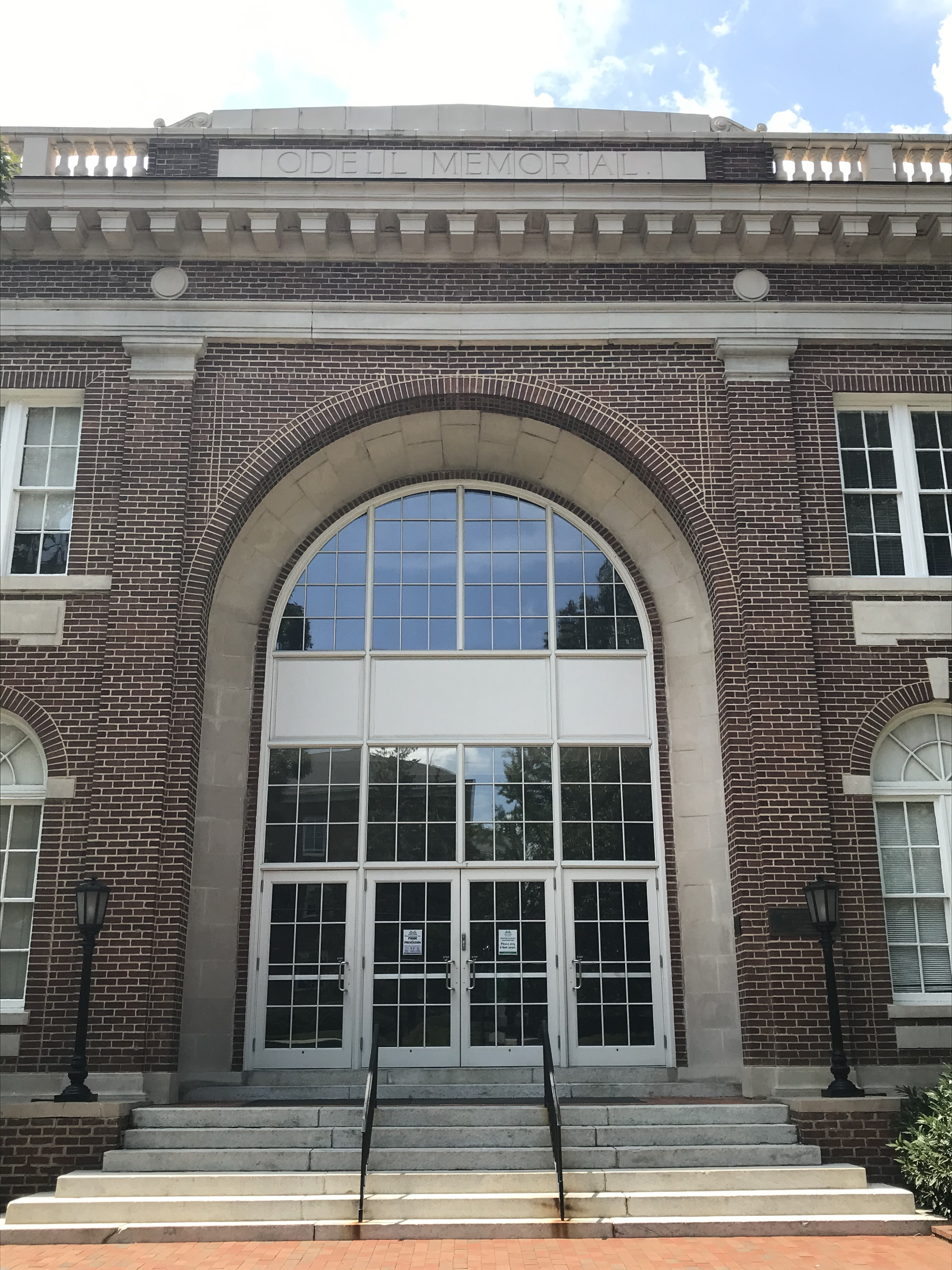
Odell Memorial Hall at Greensboro College

=== Higher education ===
Greensboro is home to many major institutions of higher education. Universities and colleges are Bennett College (liberal arts, four year, 650 students); Elon University School of Law; Greensboro College (private, liberal arts, four year, 1300 students); Guilford College (private, liberal arts, four year, 2100 students); North Carolina Agricultural and Technical State University (public, four year, 14,311 students); the University of North Carolina at Greensboro (public, four year, 20,000 students) and ECPI University (Private, Technology and Nursing). Greensboro and Guilford County are served by the two year Guilford Technical Community College (15,000 students), which is between Greensboro and High Point.

The Greater Greensboro Consortium was established to allow college students enrolled in one Greensboro-area institution to cross-register at other institutions in the same area. Students are also allowed to join certain student organizations at other institutions in the consortium not present at their home institution.

=== Public education ===
Greensboro's public schools are operated by Guilford County Schools, the state's third-largest school system, with about 71,000 students. Greensboro has one of the oldest public high schools in the state, Grimsley High School, established in 1899 as Greensboro High School, also known for their athletics. It is also home to Weaver Academy for the Performing and Visual Arts & Advanced Technology, an arts high school. Greensboro has the state's first early college, The Early College at Guilford, a top public High School. The City hosts multiple feats in public education, containing some of the best scoring Middle and High schools in North Carolina.

The state-operated Central North Carolina School for the Deaf was formerly in Greensboro.

=== Private education ===
Greensboro is home to many private day schools, including Greensboro Day School, Our Lady of Grace Catholic School, New Garden Friends School, Caldwell Academy, B'nai Shalom Day School, Canterbury School, Noble Academy, Vandalia Christian School, Shining Light Christian Academy, Saint Pius X Catholic School, and Covenant Christian Day School. The area has two boarding schools: the American Hebrew Academy and the Oak Ridge Military Academy, in nearby Oak Ridge.

== Media ==
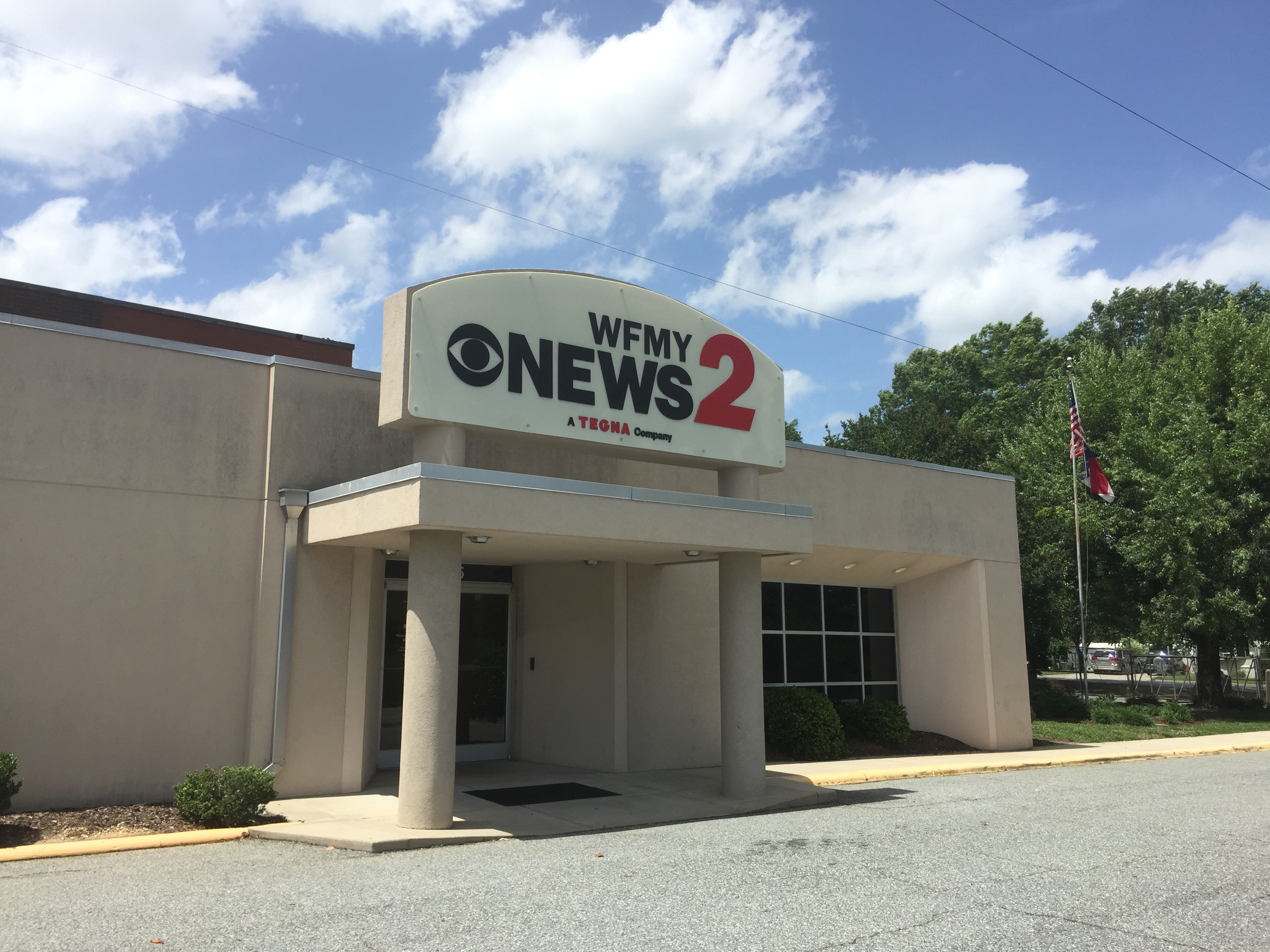
WFMY-TV is Greensboro's CBS affiliate.

=== Newspapers ===
The Greensboro News & Record, part of the newspaper group owned by Lee Enterprises, is the daily newspaper. The Triad Business Journal, part of the American City Business Journals chain of business weeklies owned by Advance Communications, is based in Greensboro and covers business across the Piedmont Triad metropolitan region. The Carolina Peacemaker is a newsweekly that covers the African-American community. Yes! Weekly, Triad City Beat, Greensboro Latino and Qué Pasa are free alternative newspapers that cover local news and events.

The Future Outlook served the African American community during the 1940s until the 1970s.

=== Broadcast television ===
Greensboro is a part of the Greensboro/Winston-Salem/High Point television designated market area and includes the following commercial broadcast stations (listed by call letters, channel number, network and city of license):

- WFMY-TV, 2, CBS, Greensboro
- WGHP, 8, Fox, High Point
- WXII-TV, 12, NBC, Winston-Salem
- WGPX, 16, Ion, Burlington
- WCWG, 20, The CW, Lexington
- WUNL-TV, 26, PBS/UNC-TV, Winston-Salem
- WXLV-TV, 45, ABC, Winston-Salem
- WGSR-TV, 47, Independent, Reidsville
- WMYV-TV, 48, MyNetworkTV, Greensboro
- WLXI-TV, 61, TCT, Greensboro

Greensboro is home to the Triad bureau of News 14 Carolina. BNT 20.2 is North Carolina's only black-owned TV station.

=== Radio ===
==== FM stations ====
- WNAA-FM (90.1, Variety), operated by North Carolina Agricultural and Technical State University
- WQFS-FM (90.9, Variety), operated by Guilford College
- WPAW-FM (93,1, The Wolf/Country)
- WQMG-FM (97.1, Urban adult contemporary)
- WSMW-FM (98.7, Adult Hits)
- WMAG-FM (99.5, Adult contemporary)
- WLJF-LP-FM (100.7, Urban Gospel)
- WDFC-LP-FM (101.7, Classical/smooth Jazz)
- WJMH-FM (102.1, Rhythmic contemporary)
- WUAG-FM (103.1, Variety), operated by University of North Carolina at Greensboro
- WKZL-FM (107.5, Pop/Top 40)
- WSSY-LP-FM (107.9, R&B/Urban Gospel)

==== AM stations ====
- WPET-AM (950, Religious)
- WCOG-AM (1320, Oldies)
- WKEW-AM (1400, Gospel)
- WBIG-AM (1470, Classic hits)
- WEAL-AM (1510, Gospel)

=== Documentaries ===
- 88 Seconds in Greensboro, PBS Frontline transcript. Reported by James Reston Jr. Directed by William Cran. Original airdate: January 24, 1983.
- February One, California newsreel documentary on 1960 sit-in by the Greensboro Four
- Greensboro's Child, documentary about the 1979 Greensboro Massacre and the shadow it cast on the survivors
- Greensboro: Closer to the Truth, Rome International Film Festival and deadCENTER Film Festival award-winning 2007 documentary about the 1979 Greensboro Massacre and aftermath
- Elvis Presley's concert in Greensboro in April 1972 was professionally recorded and became part of the Golden Globe award-winning musical documentary Elvis on Tour featuring Elvis in three different concerts, including the one in Greensboro.

== Infrastructure ==
=== Public safety ===
==== Police department ====
The Greensboro Police Department (GPD) consist of approximately 787 sworn law enforcement officers and non-sworn employees. In March 2024, Officer Terrence Harris stated that the department was short 80 of its desired 650 sworn officer positions.

==== Fire department ====
The Greensboro Fire Department provides fire protection and assist with emergency medical services (EMS) throughout the city. Guilford County EMS is the primary resource for EMS in Greensboro and the surrounding areas within Guilford County.

=== Hospitals ===
Greensboro is served by Cone Health Behavioral Health Hospital, Moses Cone Hospital and Wesley Long Hospital, Select Specialty Hospital, Kindred Hospital Greensboro.

=== Transportation ===
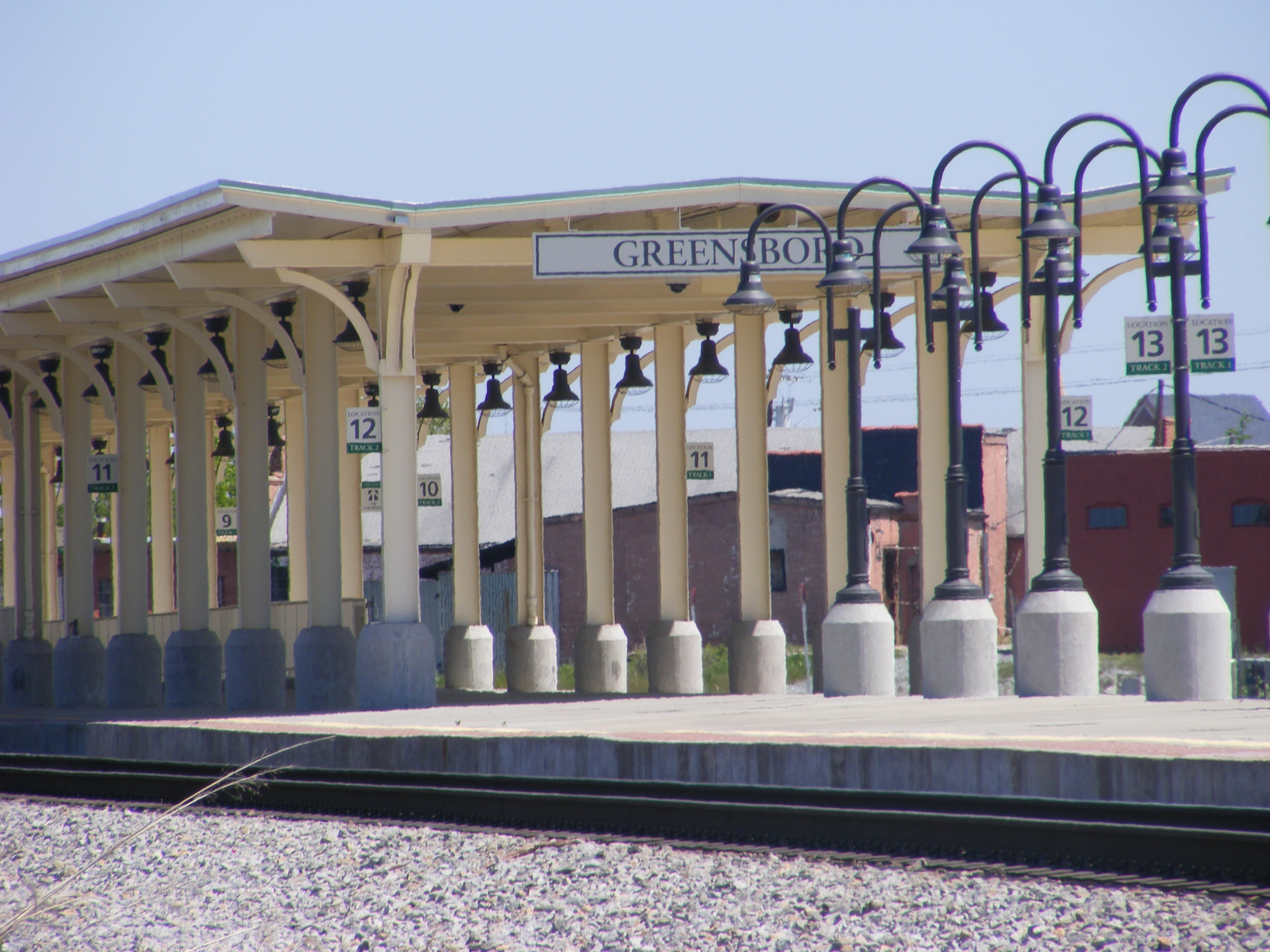
Greensboro's Amtrak Station & Rail Depot

Greensboro is served by Piedmont Triad International Airport, which also serves the nearby cities of High Point and Winston-Salem as well as the surrounding Piedmont Triad metropolitan region. Piedmont Triad International is North Carolina's third-busiest airport, averaging 280 takeoffs and landings a day. Notable passenger flights include, Allegiant Air, American Airlines, American Eagle, Delta Air Lines and United Express. PTI is a hub for FedEx Express.

Amtrak's daily Crescent, Carolinian and Piedmont trains connect Greensboro with New York, Philadelphia, Baltimore, Washington, D.C., Richmond, Raleigh, Charlotte, Atlanta, Birmingham and New Orleans.

Amtrak trains, taxis, local and long-distance buses arrive and depart from the J. Douglas Galyon Depot, also known as Greensboro station, at 236-C East Washington Street. Originally constructed in the early 1920s, the station and depot were renovated in 2004.

The Greensboro Transit Authority offers public bus service throughout the city. Regional public transportation throughout the metropolitan area is coordinated by PART, Piedmont Area Regional Transportation.

The Greensboro Greenway is a bike trail that is being constructed to encircle downtown Greensboro. It will connect to other trails and lead out to the Bur-Mil Park area and further.

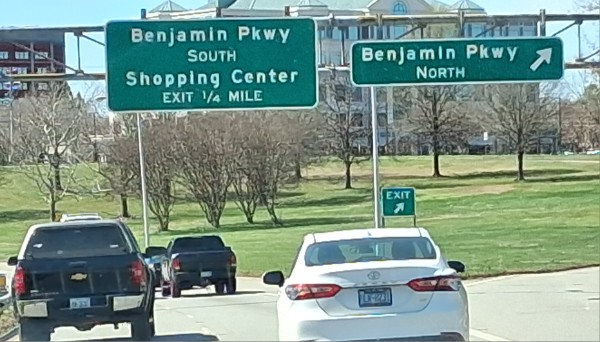
Wendover Avenue (US 70) in the outskirts of Downtown Greensboro.

==== Interstate Highways ====
- I-40
- I-73
- I-85
- Future I-685
- I-785 / Future I-785
- I-840

Interstate 40 is the key east–west interstate in the city. Interstate 85 travels in the southern outskirts of Greensboro, from southwest to northeast, before interchanging with I-40 in the eastern outskirts of the city. I-85 and I-40 also travels concurrently, east of the junction. This concurrency connects the three regions of: the Piedmont Triad, Triangle, and Metrolina. The Greensboro Urban Loop is the beltway around the core areas of the city, carrying Interstate 785, Interstate 840, Interstate 73, Interstate 85, and US 421.

US 29 connects I-85 into central Greensboro, and travels along O'Henry Boulevard when going north towards Reidsville. The stretch where US 29 and US 220 merges onto Interstate 40, forms the decades-long referred, "Death Valley"; which had been known to be congested and accident-prone stretch, in which several major federal and interstate routes had combined into a single freeway vicinity which had lasted for several years. The Death Valley had been subject to since-completed partial updates, and future extensive rebuilding. US 421 is concurrent with I-40, before traveling along the southern stretch of the loop, and eventually diverging from the loop and continuing south into Sanford. US 421 between the Greensboro Urban Loop and the stretch connecting to Sanford, is proposed to be designated as I-685. Wendover Avenue (US 70) traverses in western and northern outskirts of Downtown Greensboro as an expressway and freeway; connecting to I-40 in the west, and I-785 and I-840 in the east. Freeman Mill Road (which is partially concurrent with US 220), Gate City Boulevard (in which the easternmost, westernmost, and Downtown stretch of Gate City Boulevard are of partial-expressway standard), Friendly Avenue, Market Street, and Josephine Boyd Street, connects downtown with the outer areas, in which, they are mostly arterial routes. NC 68 and Bryan Boulevard connect to The PTI Airport, with the two also interchanging with I-40 and I-73.

== Sister cities ==
Greensboro has a sister city relationship with three cities to foster international friendship and cooperation:

- Montbéliard, France
- Sectorul Buiucani, Chișinău, Moldova
- Yingkou, China

== See also ==
- List of municipalities in North Carolina
- Piedmont Triad
- 1936 Cordele-Greensboro tornado outbreak
- Greensboro Fire Department
- List of U.S. cities with large Black populations
