= Brenton =

Brenton is an English place name and surname. The surname Brenton indicates that one's ancestors came from a place called Brenton near Exminster, Devon, south West England, the original meaning of which was "Bryni's homestead". Bryni was an Old English given name based on the word bryne, "flame".

Brenton is now also used as a given name in English-speaking countries. It has been one of the thousand most common names for boys born in the United States since 1966. The name can be commonly found in the United States, Canada, Australia and New Zealand. In Australia, it is particularly associated with South Australia, where it has historically been very popular. Its popularity in Australian and the US increased in the 1980s due to the TV miniseries All the Rivers Run, based on the 1958 novel of the same name by Nancy Cato, which contained a character named Brenton Edwards.

== Given name ==
- Brenton Adcock, Australian rules footballer
- Brenton Bersin (born 1990), American football wide receiver
- Brenton Best (born 1963), Australian politician
- Brenton Birmingham (born 1972), American-Icelandic basketball player
- Brenton Bowen (born 1983), Australian rugby league player
- Brenton Broadstock (born 1952), Australian composer
- Brenton Brown (born 1973), South African-American Christian musician
- Brenton Cabello (born 1981), Spanish swimmer
- Brenton Cox Jr. (born 2000), American football player
- Brenton Griffiths (born 1991), Jamaican footballer
- Brenton Grove (born 1997), Australian racing driver
- Brenton Halliburton (1774–1860), Chief Justice of the Nova Scotia Supreme Court
- Brenton Harris (born 1969), Australian rules footballer
- Brenton G. Hayden, American entrepreneur
- Brenton Jones (born 1991), Australian racing cyclist
- Brenton Klaebe (born 1966), Australian rules footballer
- Brenton Langbein (1928–1993), Australian violinist, composer, and conductor
- Brenton Lawrence (born 1984), Australian rugby league player
- Brenton Raymond Lewis, Australian physicist
- Brenton Miels (1948–1997), Australian rules footballer
- Brenton Metzler, American producer
- Brenton Parchment (born 1982), West Indian cricketer
- Brenton Phillips (born 1962), former Australian rules footballer
- Brenton Pomery (born 1973), Australian rugby league player
- Brenton Rickard (born 1983), Australian swimmer
- Brenton Sanderson (born 1974), former Australian rules footballer
- Brenton See, Australian artist
- Brenton Strange (born 2000), American football player
- Brenton Spencer, Canadian film and television director
- Brenton Tarrant (born 1990), Australian terrorist
- Brenton Thwaites (born 1989), Australian actor
- Brenton Vilcins (born 1966), Australian rules footballer
- Brenton Weyi (born 1990), American writer
- Brenton Wood (1941–2025), American singer and songwriter
- Brenton G. Yorgason (1945–2016), American novelist

== Surname ==
- Edward Brabazon Brenton (1763–1845), lawyer, judge, and politician in modern-day Canada
- Edward Pelham Brenton (1774–1839), British officer of the Royal Navy
- Francis Brenton (1927–1971?), British adventurer
- Howard Brenton (born 1942), English playwright and screenwriter
- James Brenton (disambiguation), several people
- Sir Jahleel Brenton, 1st Baronet, KCB (1770–1844), British admiral
- Lancelot Charles Lee Brenton (1807–1862), translator of the Septuagint
- Lynn Brenton (1889–1968), American baseball player
- Marianne Brenton (1933–2013), American politician
- Samuel Brenton (1810–1857), American politician from Indiana
- Timothy Brenton (1970–2009), American police officer, murder victim
- Tommy Brenton (born 1989), American basketball player
- Tony Brenton (born 1950), British diplomat
- Will Brenton, British writer and producer
- William Brenton (c. 1610–1674), colonial administrator in what is now the United States

== See also ==
- Brenton Butler case, case of overturned murder conviction
