= Edward Brenton =

Edward Brenton may refer to:

- Edward Brabazon Brenton (1763–1845), lawyer, judge and political figure in Nova Scotia and Newfoundland
- Edward Pelham Brenton (1774–1839), officer of the British Royal Navy
