= Every Beating Second =

Sculpture by Janet Echelman

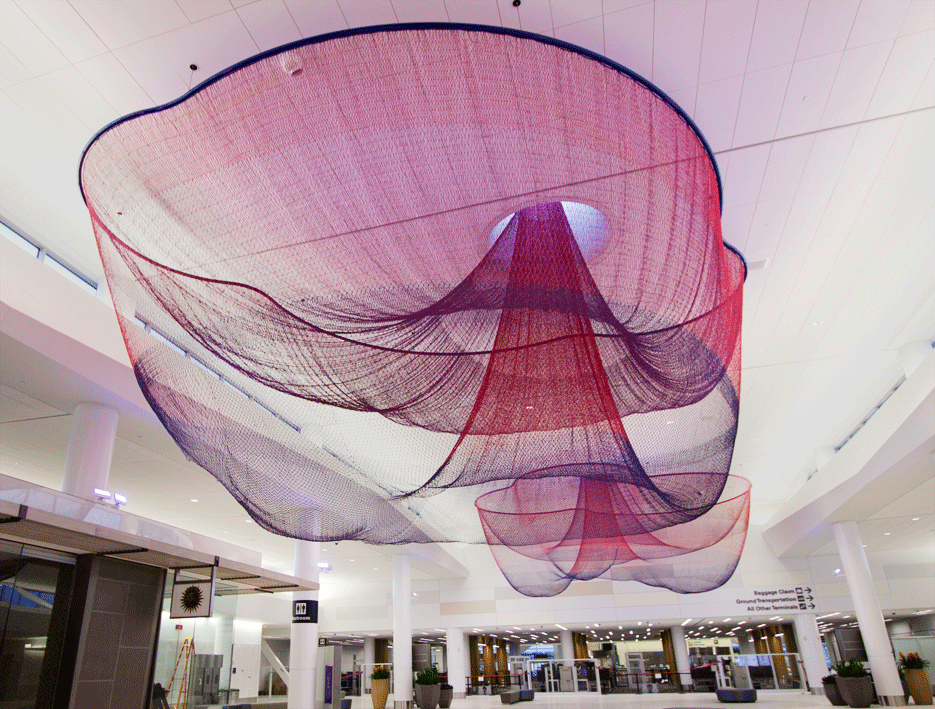
- Artist: Janet Echelman
- Year: 2011
- Type: Powder-coated steel, skylights, colored fiber, computer-programmed airflow & colored light, and terrazzo floor.
- Location: San Francisco International Airport, Terminal 2; San Mateo County, California, United States; 37.6174°N 122.3820°W

Every Beating Second is a large netted sculpture designed by artist Janet Echelman. The sculpture is located in Terminal 2 of the San Francisco International Airport, which opened in April 2011. The piece is composed of three separate netted structures, each connected to a skylight, hanging from the ceiling of the terminal.

== Design ==
The sculpture consists of several elements. Three net structures hang from the ceiling under skylights designed to cast shadows of the nets on the floor. The terrazzo flooring is part of the work, and is designed to look like shadows of each net sculpture. At night, the lighting transitions in color from indigo to orange. Computer controlled airflow makes the sculpture and skylight shadows appear to move with the wind.

The nets were created with braided fibers and knotted twine suspended from rings of steel armature. The nets' shapes are designed to look like clouds and reference local weather patterns and microclimates. The colors were chosen to be reminiscent of psychedelic music artwork and the Summer of Love, while also reflecting that the bay area as a contemporary hub of innovation and technology.

The title, Every Beating Second, referring to a line by beat poet Allen Ginsberg, represents the artist's interest in heightening awareness of the present moment.

== Materials and size ==
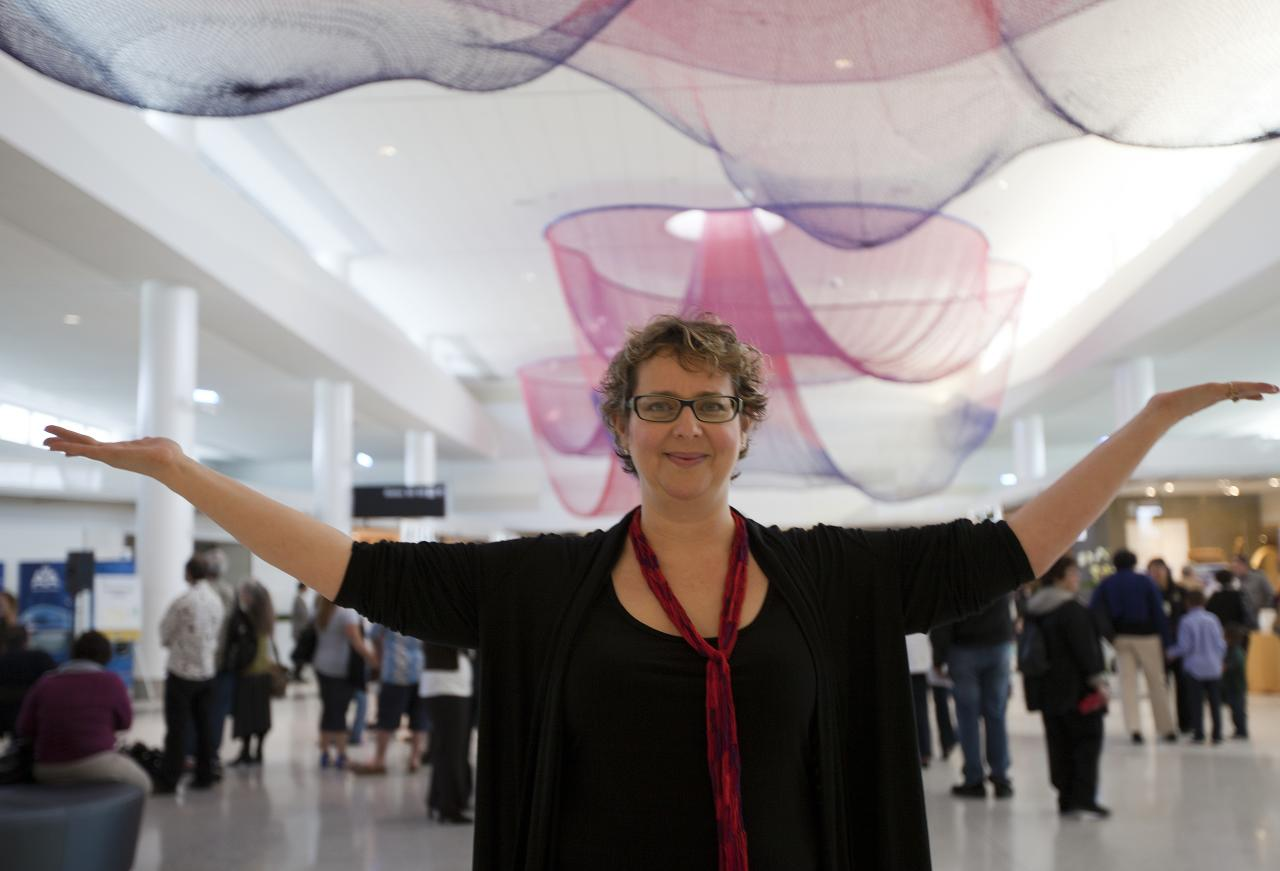
Janet Echelman beneath Every Beating Second

Powder-coated steel, colored fiber, skylights, terrazzo floor, computer-programmed airflow, colored lighting

Net 1: 1,663 sq. ft. / 33 ft. length x 39 ft. width x 19 ft. height

Net 2: 1,930 sq. ft. / 30 ft. length x 35 ft. width x 22 ft. height

Net 3: 894 sq. ft. / 18 ft. length x 18 ft. width x 19 ft. height

Total area: approx. 15,000 sq. ft. / 176.5 ft. length x 83.5 ft. depth x 28.5 ft. height
