= James Brenton =

James Brenton may refer to:

- James Brenton (politician) (1736–1806), lawyer, judge and political figure in Nova Scotia
- James Brenton (soldier) (1741–1782), American Revolutionary War officer
- James D. Brenton (fl. 1980s–2020s), clinician scientist
