= Brigida =

Brigida or Brígida may refer to:

- Saint Brigida of Kildare, Catholic saint
- Saint Brigida of Sweden, Catholic saint
- Brígida Baltar (born 1959), Brazilian visual artist
- Brigida Banti Giorgi (1757–1806), noted Italian soprano in the 18th and early 19th century
- Brigida Haraldsdotter, medieval Swedish Queen consort, spouse of King Magnus (II) of Sweden
- Santa Brígida, Las Palmas, Canarian municipality in the northeastern portion of the island of Gran Canaria
- Santa Brigida (BG), comune in the Province of Bergamo in the Italian region of Lombardy
