= Earthtime Series =

Public art sculpture

Coordinates: 39°44′15″N 104°59′20″W

== Earthtime 1.8 ==
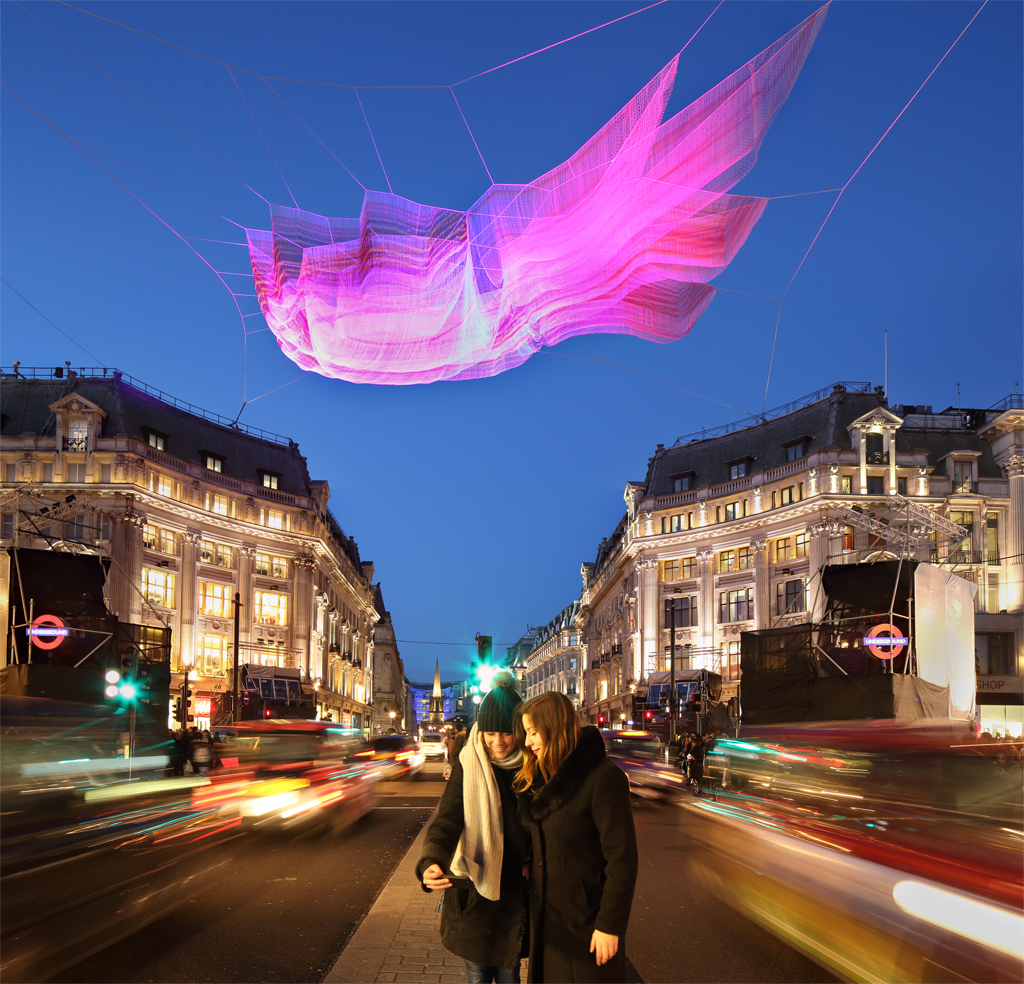
"Earthtime 1.8" in London, UK

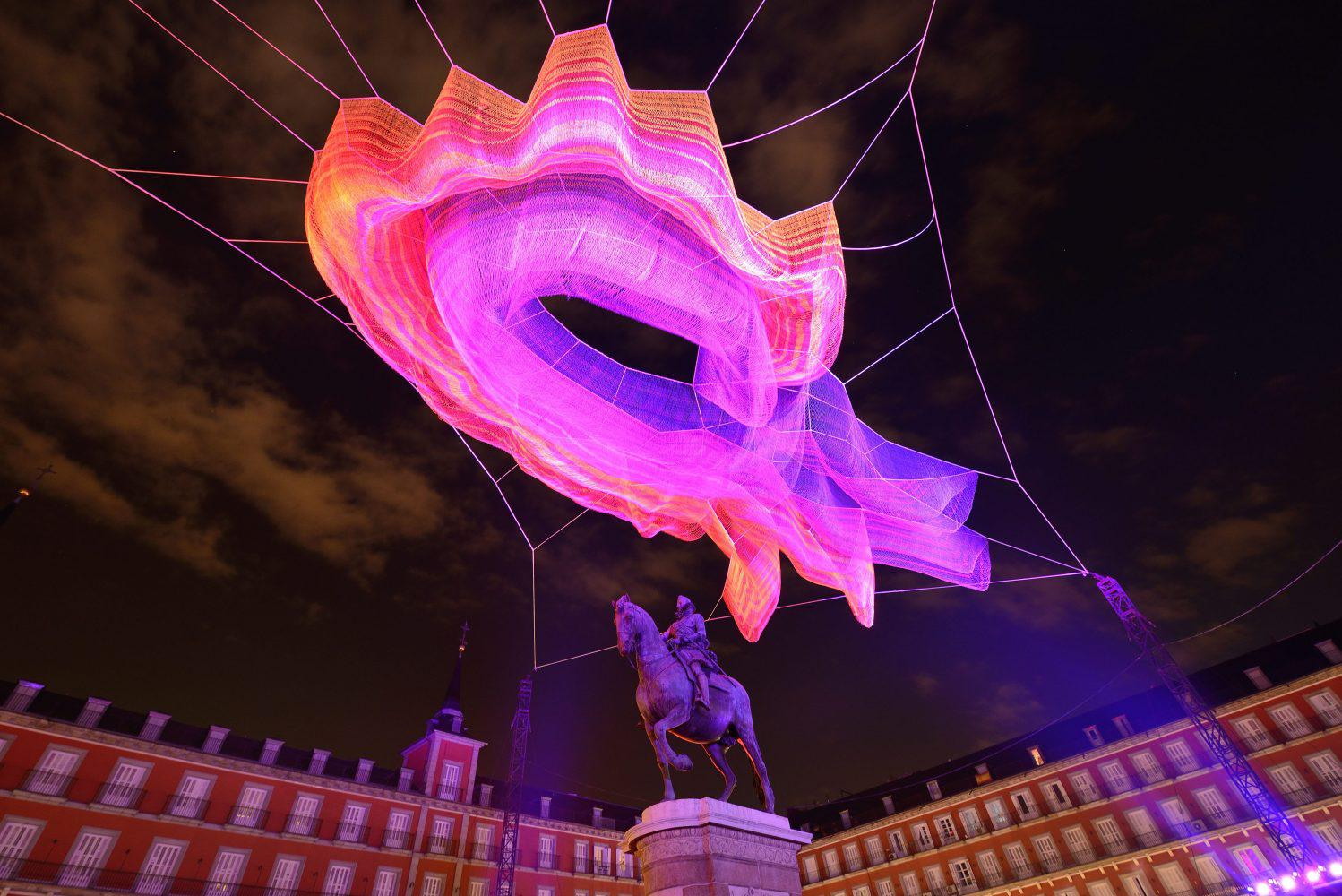
"Earthtime 1.78" in Madrid, Spain

Earthtime 1.8 is a large aerial net sculpture which undulates in the wind and weather. It can be transported and installed for exhibitions, tethered to existing architecture. At night, colored light is projected onto the sculpture and can be altered via smartphone app by the viewing public.

The sculpture's title refers to the period in microseconds that the day was shortened as a result of the 2011 Tōhoku earthquake and tsunami, and its form was inspired by data sets of the tsunami's wave height rippling across the Pacific Ocean.

== Earthtime 1.78 ==
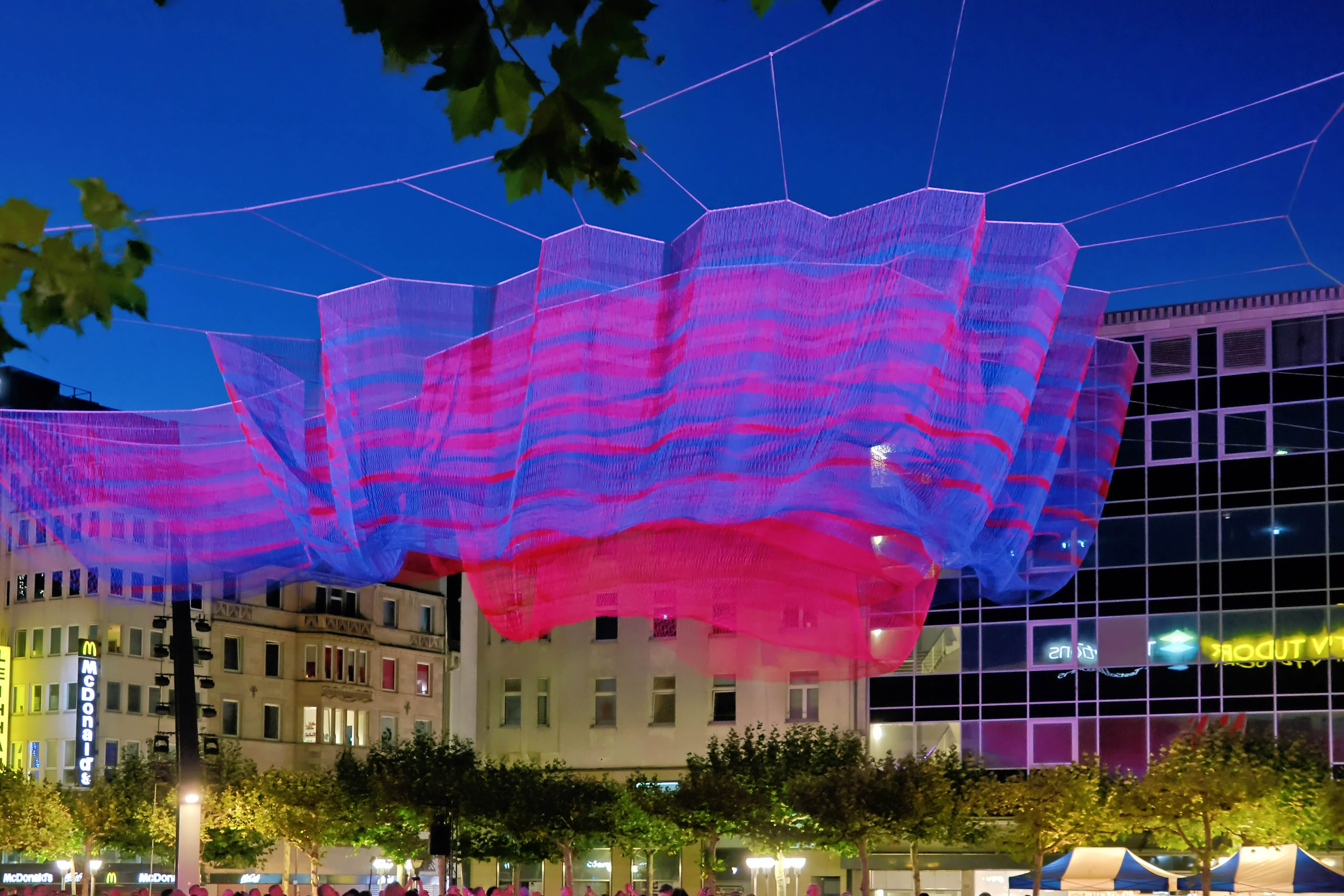
A Sky Full of Hope – Earthtime 1.78 Frankfurt by Janet Echelman (2026)

The "Earthtime 1.78" design was formed from the scientific data after the Tōhoku earthquake and tsunami that originated in Japan in 2011.

== Earthtime 1.26 ==
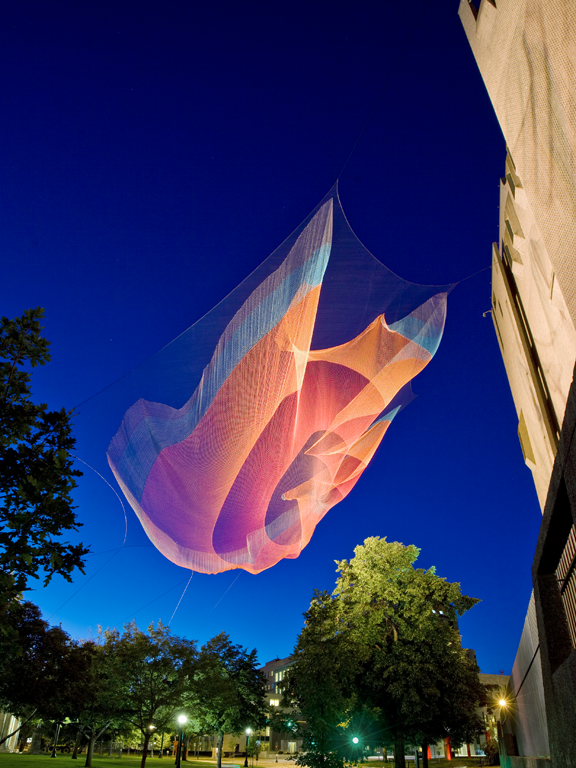
"Earthtime 1.26" in Denver, Colorado

"Earthtime 1.26" is a 230-foot (70 m) aerial sculpture originally created for the City of Denver's Biennial of the Americas celebration in July 2010. The city requested a large-yet-temporary work exploring the theme of interconnectedness of the 35 nations of the Western Hemisphere. Its form was inspired by data sets of the tsunami's wave height rippling across the Pacific Ocean.

Unable to use a steel armature, a UHMWPE support structure was developed. This resulted in a lightweight, low-impact design which could be temporarily attached to existing architectural structures, and also allowed the sculpture to better respond to the wind. At night darkness conceals the support cables while colored lighting creates the appearance of a floating form.

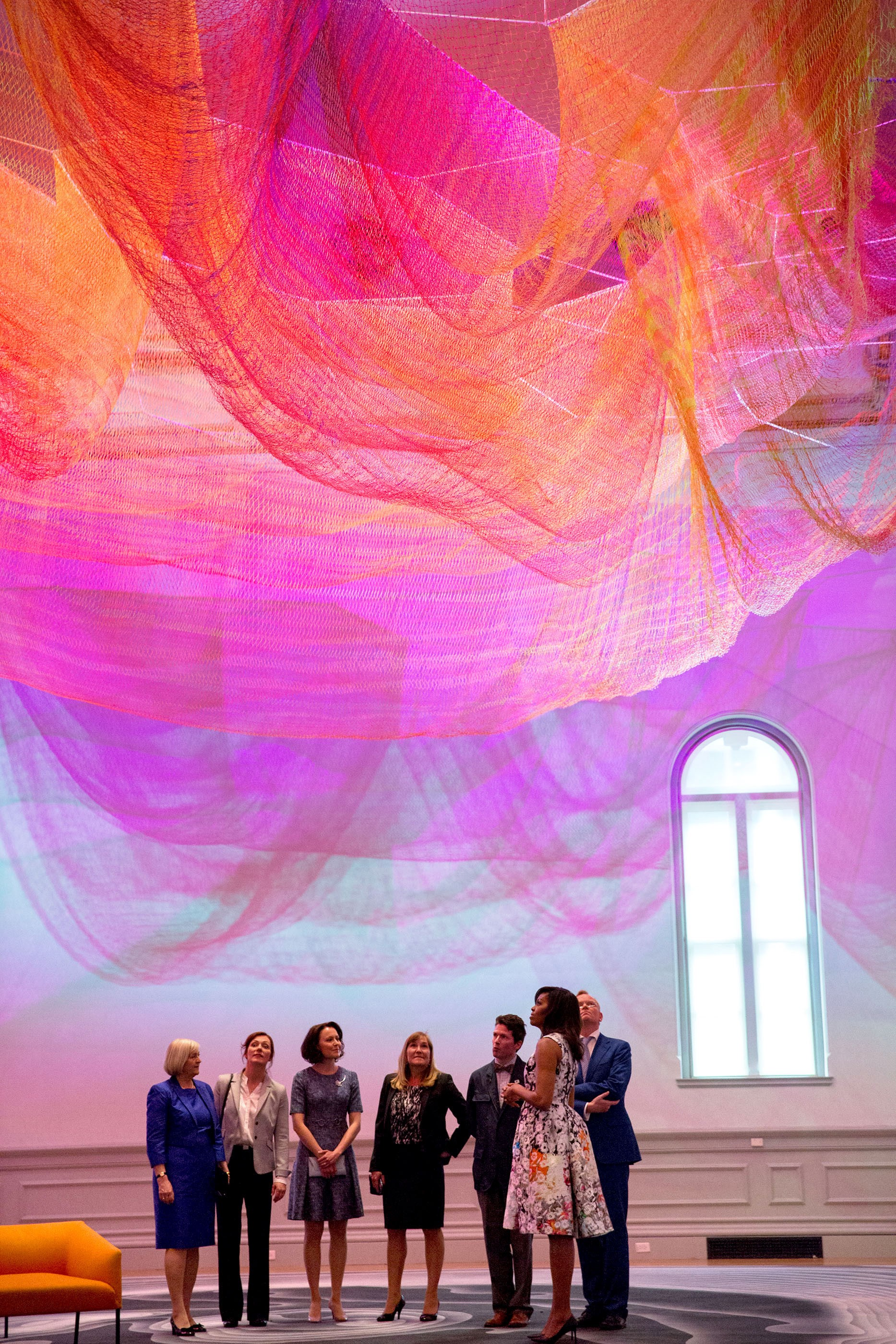
Michelle Obama visiting "Earthtime 1.8 Renwick"

== Earthtime 1.8 Renwick ==
"Earthtime 1.8 Renwick" is a net sculpture crafted by Janet Echelman in 2015, commissioned by the Smithsonian American Art Museum. It was created for the reopening of the Renwick Gallery in Washington, D.C. after a two-year renovation and the goal to make a more interactive space.

The sculpture's design was inspired by the data recorded after the Tohoku earthquake and tsunami that rippled across the Pacific Ocean toward Japan. The geologic event shifted the earth on its axis and shortened the day by 1.8 millionths of a second, giving the piece its title.
