= Butterfly Rest Stop =

Soft fiber sculpture by Janet Echelman, in Frisco, Texas

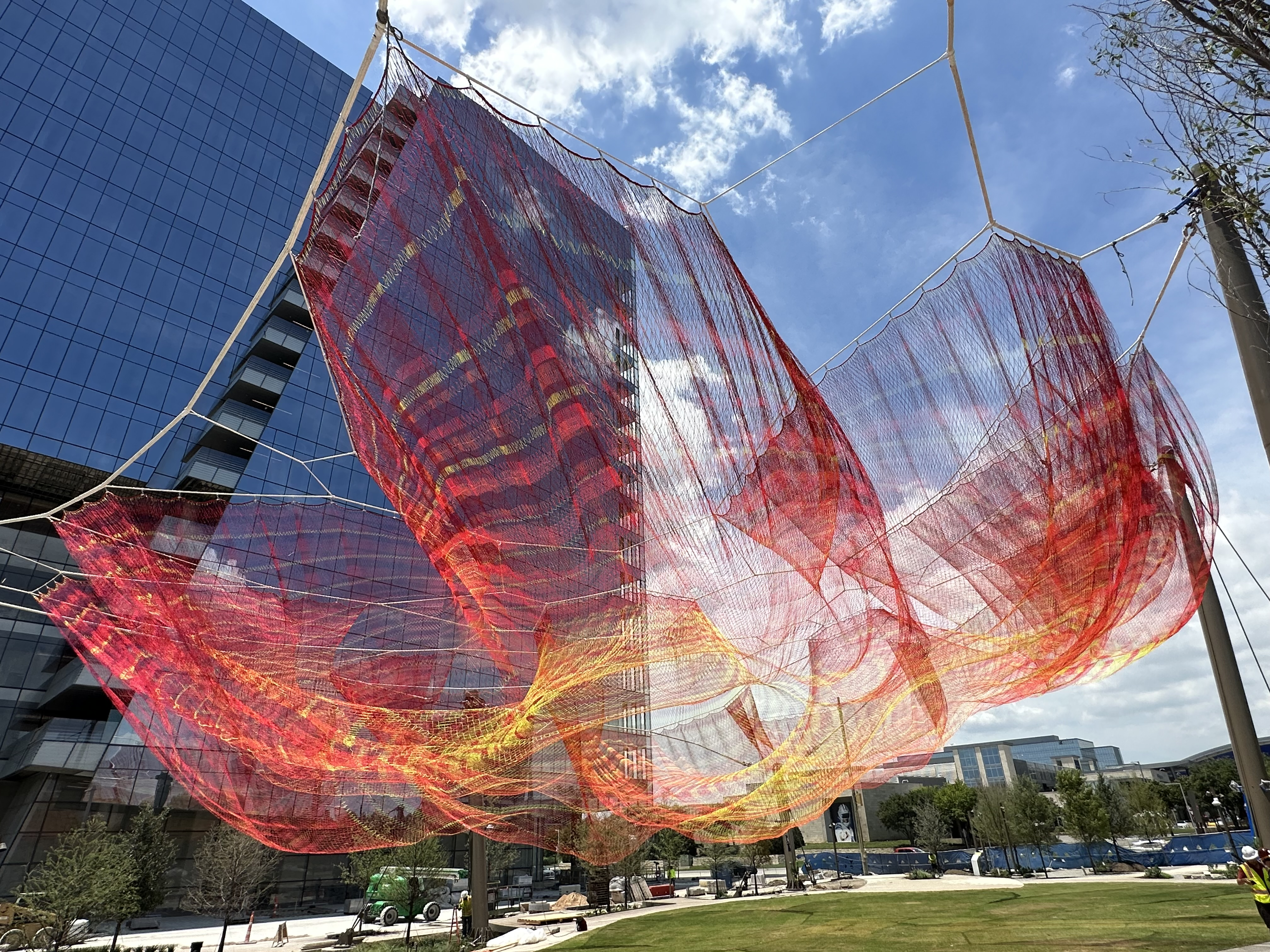
- Artist: Janet Echelman
- Year: 2024
- Medium: Fiber art
- Location: Frisco, Texas; 33°06′21.9″N 96°49′38.2″W
- Owner: Hall Park
- Website: https://www.echelman.com/work#/butterfly-rest-stop/

Butterfly Rest Stop is a soft fiber sculpture by Janet Echelman, installed in Frisco, Texas, United States. The work is suspended over the Kaleidoscope Park within Hall Park.

== Design ==
The sculpture Butterfly Rest Stop is crafted from 88.9 miles of twine with a total of 791,788 knots. Echelman's artwork explores themes of interconnectedness between humans and nature.

The main focus of the sculpture is to highlight the important role that butterflies play in the earth's ecosystem. The forms, colors, and patterns shown within Butterfly Rest Stop reflect the native species of milkweed flowers that sustain the monarch butterflies throughout their migration.

This artwork is a conceptual exploration of perception, questioning how a flower might appear to a species that sees the world entirely differently from humans. Unlike Homosapiens, Monarch butterflies possess compound eyes that allow them to see in multiple directions—up, down, forward, backward, and to the sides—all at once. However, unlike humans, they cannot merge these images into a single, continuous view.
