= Biennial of the Americas =

Art festival

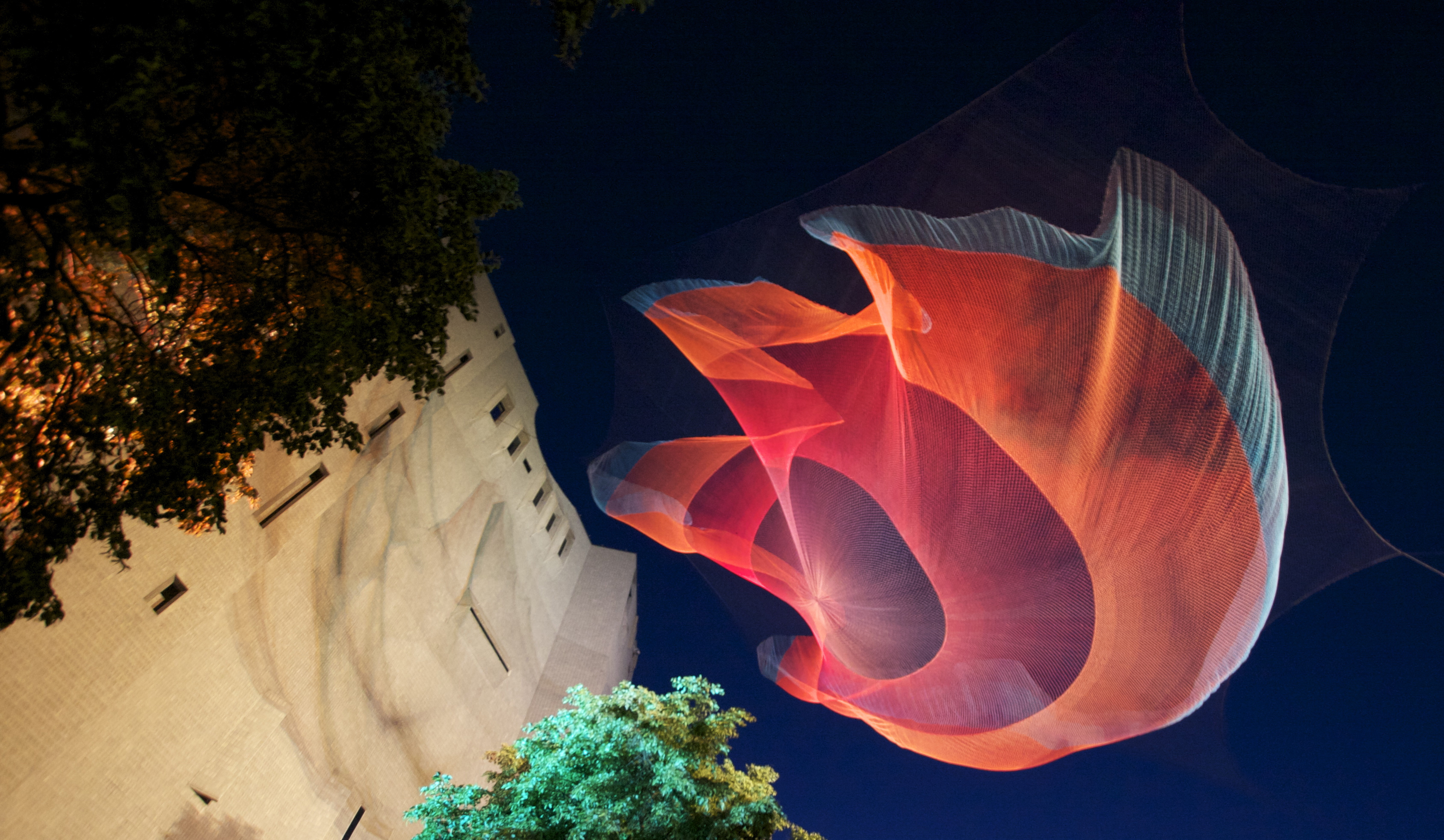
Janet Echelman: 1.26 sculpture, 2010 Biennial of the Americas

The Biennial of the Americas is an international festival of ideas, art, and culture hosted in Denver, Colorado every two years. According to its website, the Biennial strives to provide a platform for people from across the region to examine major issues impacting life in the Americas. With three main themes of ideas, art, and culture, the Biennial is designed to bring together experts and leaders from across North, South, and Central America in a variety of formats that include panel discussions, peer-to-peer workshops, art exhibits, outdoor architectural installations, and public parties.

== 2013 Festival ==
The 2013 Biennial of the Americas took place in Denver, CO from July 16- September 2. The latest Biennial of the Americas occurred in September 2019 in Denver on the theme of "Empathy in Action." The 2013 opening week began on July 16 with the theme “Unleashing Human Potential: Reinventing Communities, Business, and Education”. 'Ideas' events ran through the closing symposium on July 19, but art and cultural pieces remained on display through Labor Day, September 2.

=== Ideas ===
Speakers during the inaugural week (July 16–19) included:

July 16: Reinventing Communities, Business, and Education

- Moderator: Tina Brown, Editor-in-Chief of the Newsweek Daily Beast Company
- Google Executive Chairman Eric Schmidt
- Former Mexican Ambassador to the United States, Arturo Sarukhan
- Colorado Governor John Hickenlooper
- Liberty Media Chairman John Malone

July 17: Reinventing Communities and How we Live

- Moderator: Arianna Huffington, chair, President, and Editor-in-Chief of The Huffington Post
- The Nature Conservancy Chief Scientist Peter Kareiva
- Colombian Ambassador to the United States, Carlos Urrutia
- Former CEO of The Panama Canal Authority, Alberto Alemán Zubieta
- Suncor Energy President and CEO Steve Williams
- Duke Energy Chairman, President and CEO Jim Rogers

July 18: Reinventing Business as Usual

- Moderator: Don Tapscott of Moxie Insight
- Case Foundation CEO Jean Case
- Qualcomm CEO Paul Jacobs
- SESC São Paulo Director Danilo Santos de Miranda
- Inter-American Development Bank Executive VP and COO Julie T. Katzman
- Morgan Stanley Latin-American Chairman Chris Harland

July 19: Reinventing Education for the Global Market

- Moderator: Patricia Janiot, Senior Anchor at CNN Español
- US Secretary of Education Arne Duncan
- Netflix CEO Reed Hastings
- Coursera Co-founder Daphne Koller
- Discovery Communications Executive Chairman John Hendricks

=== Art ===
Along with recruiting high-profile speakers, the Biennial commissions major artistic exhibitions throughout the city of Denver. Artists and architects from across the Americas participate in the programming.: The Biennial of the Americas’ 2013 exhibition, Draft Urbanism, was curated by Carson Chan, Gaspar Libedinsky, Paul Andersen, and Cortney Stell. The exhibition brought together artists and architects from across the Americas to create site-specific art and architectural installations throughout Downtown Denver and in the historic McNichols Building. The exhibition explored the many meanings of the word “draft,” looking at the ideas of iteration, process, and the ever-changing urban fabric. In addition to last year's Draft Urbanism, the Biennial of the Americas will highlight Denver's cultural offerings with featured exhibitions, films, public parties, performances, and other events intended to explore the various cultures of the Americas during the upcoming festival as well.:

=== Culture ===
The Biennial also organized a series of public festivals throughout Denver in tandem with organizations such as the Denver Museum of Contemporary Art, Arts and Venues Denver, the Center for Visual Arts, the Clyfford Still Museum, the Colorado Ballet, the Colorado Symphony, the Denver Architectural Foundation, the Denver Art Museum, the Denver Botanical Gardens, Denver Digerati, the Denver Film Society, the Denver International Airport Art Gallery, the Denver Museum of Nature and Science, the Mexican Cultural Center, Museo de las Americas, Platte Forum, Santa Fe Art District, Su Teatro, Redline, Rino Arts District, and Rocky Mountain College of Art and Design.:

- July 16: Art Opening: Draft Urbanism
- July 17: Canada Night at Sustainability Park
- July 18: Mexico Night!
- July 19: Denver Night!

Public festivals will also be a part of the 2015 Biennial of the Americas.

== History ==
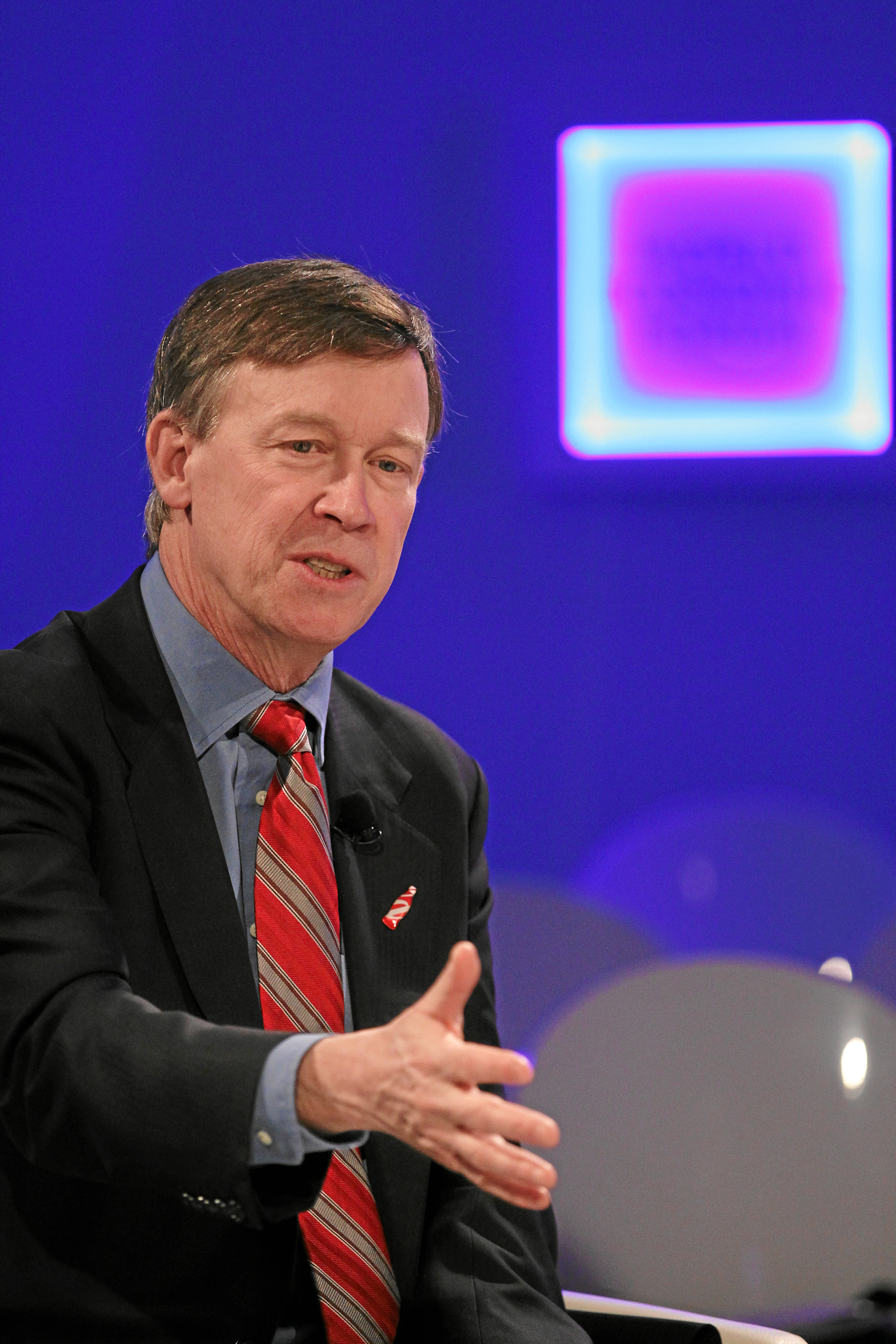
Colorado Governor John Hickenlooper

Before becoming governor, John Hickenlooper served as the mayor of Denver from 2003 to 2011. During that time he developed a vision for an event that would celebrate the ideas and cultures of the Americas, believing that such an event would highlight Denver as a hub for bipartisan discussion. This idea developed into what is now the Biennial of the Americas. During the inaugural Biennial of the Americas in 2010, the Biennial welcomed national and international visitors during a month-long celebration. Programming included free musical performances by artists such as Juana Molina, and a number of artistic exhibitions across Denver. Speakers participated in roundtable discussions that ranged widely by subject. Topics included education, philanthropy, climate and energy change, health, public and private collaboration, poverty reduction, trade, and women as “Drivers in the New Economy”. Roundtable participants included:

- Alejandro Toledo, former president of the Republic of Peru
- Fernanado de la Rúa, former president of the Argentine Republic
- Gustavo Noboa, former president of the Republic of Ecuador
- Hipólito Mejía, former president of the Dominican Republic
- Nicolás Ardito Barletta, former president of the Republic of Panama
- Rodrigo Borja Cavallos, former president of the Republic of Ecuador
- Vinicio Cerezo, former president of the Republic of Guatemala
- Arturo Fermandois, former Ambassador of Chile to the United States
- Arturo Sarukhan, former Ambassador of Mexico to the United States
- Carolina Barco, former Ambassador of Colombia to the United States
- Francisco Villagran, Ambassador of Guatemala to the United States
- Gary Doer, Ambassador of Canada to the United States
- Jaime Alemán, former Ambassador of Panama to the United States
- Hugo Llorens, former Ambassador of the United States to Honduras
- Luis Valdivieso, former Ambassador of Chile to the United States
- Mauro Vieira, Ambassador of Brazil to the United States
- Thomas Shannon, Ambassador of the United States to Brazil
- Vilma Martinez, Ambassador of the United States to Argentina
- William Brownfield, Ambassador of the United States to Colombia

Artists that participated in the 2010 Biennial of the Americas included Felipe Mujica, Brigida Baltar, Jeronimo Hagerman, Lucia Koch, Santiago Cucullo, Clark Richert, Ronald Rael, Virginia San Fratello, Teddy Cruz, Nicolas de Moncheaux, Alexis Rochas, Joseph Shaeffer and Estafonia Peñafiel.
