= Brenton Weyi =

American essayist, playwright and poet of DR-Congolese descent

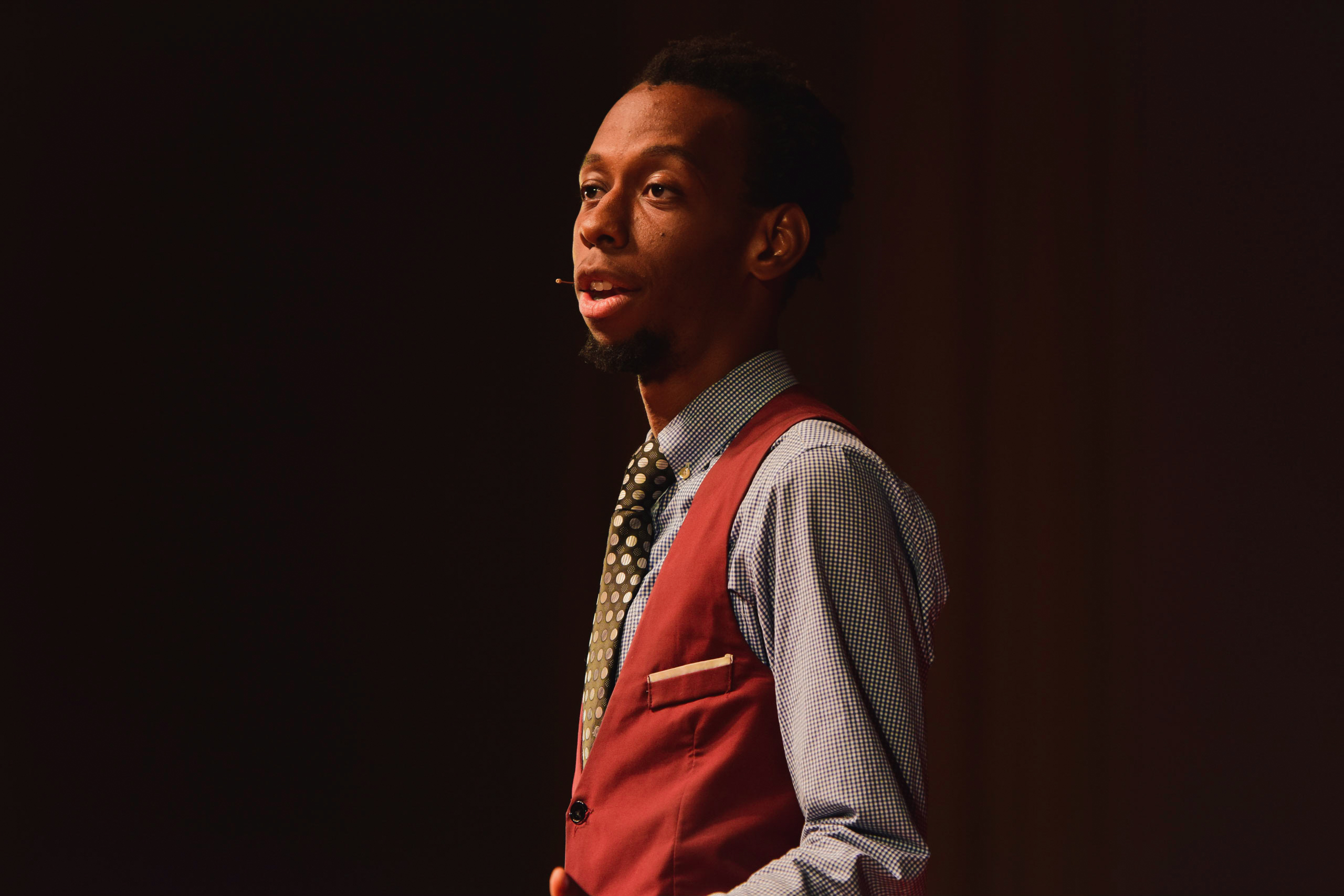

Personal details
- Born: Brenton Zola Weyi; January 16, 1990 (age 36) Dallas, Texas
- Education: Whitman College
- Profession: Writer and Multidisciplinary Artist
- Website: brentonweyi.com

Brenton Weyi (born January 16, 1990) is an American essayist, thinker, playwright, poet, and humanist. He is an inaugural Playwright Fellow at Denver Center for the Performing Arts as well as a lead organizer for TEDxBoulder—one of the largest global TEDx events. He is known for cross-disciplinary creativity as well as for his upcoming musical, My Country, My Country

He is the great-great-grandson of venerated Congolese religious leader Simon Kimbangu, the great-grandson of statesman Charles Kisolokele, and a descendant of Kongo Empire prophet and leader Kimpa Vita

== Education ==
Weyi was born in Dallas, Texas, and grew up in Denver, Colorado; he is the son of immigrants. He grew up speaking French and Lingala, and later learned Japanese. He attended George Washington High School, where he co-captained the inaugural mock trial team to become the first in Denver Public Schools history to win a State Championship and earn a top-5 national title. Weyi then attended Whitman College, where he earned degrees in both philosophy and history. He appeared in several theatre works, founded a hip-hop crew and co-founded an award-winning poetry team. He also engaged in improvisation, music and danced professionally for a period.

== Career ==
After completing his undergraduate education, Weyi moved to Thailand, where he lived and worked at a meditation and martial arts school. He has written for numerous digital and print publications, and is known for his poetic essays, often addressing various humanist topics. He is also known for his travels to over 60 nations. In 2014, Weyi became an early adopter of the sharing economy, becoming a champion for Airbnb.

He created a reputation for his multi-disciplinary storytelling and immersive creative work. He has partnered with the Denver Museum of Nature and Science, Norman Rockwell Museum, Denver Art Museum, the Flobots, The Schusterman Foundation and others.

In 2015, Weyi joined Playback Theatre West, Colorado's longest-running improvisational theatre company, which uses theater an empathy-building tool. In the same year, he also co-founded Storytellers Acapella, an all-male vocal quintet with the mission of bringing together communities with music and storytelling. In 2016, he began tapping into his background to create art around the challenges and beauty in the Central African region.

In 2019, Weyi was a featured storyteller of Denver's edition of the Empathy Museum, a travelling pop-up that encourages members of the public to walk in each other's shoes. The project was originally founded by artist Clare Patey, and Denver's edition was put on by the Biennial of the Americas, featuring stories from Suzi Q Smith, Mayor Michael B Hancock, and others.

=== My Country, My Country musical ===
In 2016, Weyi began work on a stage musical focusing on Congolese independence in the backdrop of the Cold War named My Country, My Country. The piece highlights the story of Patrice Lumumba and Baudouin I of Belgium and the tumultuous time of nationalism and Communism around the world that eventually led to Lumumba's death. Weyi staged his first reading at the Denver Art Museum in 2018. In late 2018, Weyi became the first Coloradan to host a Massivemuse—a large, multidisciplinary arts event—for national classical music company Groupmuse, which featured a staged reading of My Country, My Country and the music of Fanny Mendelssohn. Weyi was named as an inaugural Playwright Fellow at the Denver Center for the Performing Arts, a new yearlong play-writing fellowship for four high-potential Colorado playwrights. In 2019, Weyi presented My Country, My Country twice more.

== Achievements ==
- 2017: TEDxBoulder Speaker with talk titled "I've Always Wanted to Tell You..."
- 2018: Grand Slam champion of Boulder Storytelling Series, Truth Be Told.
- 2019: Nominated by the City of Denver and Denver Public Library for the Juanita Gray award for exemplary service to the city by an African-American.
- 2019: Featured as a 'Colorado Creative,' a yearly series profiling the top 100 creatives in Colorado
- 2019: Named Inaugural Dramatic Writing Fellow at Lighthouse Writer's Workshop 'Writing in Color' retreat
