= Brígida Baltar =

Brazilian visual artist (1959/60–2022)

- Born: 1959/1960; Rio de Janeiro, Brazil
- Died: 8 October 2022 (aged 62)
- Education: Escola de Artes Visuais do Parque Lage

Brígida Baltar (1959/1960 – 8 October 2022) was a Brazilian visual artist. Her work spanned across a wide range of mediums, including video, performance, installation, drawing, and sculpture. She was interested in capturing the ephemeral in her artwork.

== Life and career ==
Brígida Baltar was born in 1959 in Rio de Janeiro, Brazil, where she lived and worked. Her career began in the 1990s, often working with primordial elements, such as the material she took from her own house in the neighbourhood of Botafogo. In recent years, Baltar's work was shown in institutions throughout Brazil and in the United States, Japan and Argentina, and other countries. She also took part in important group shows, such as The Peripatetic School – Itinerant Drawing From Latin America (2011), which premiered at the Drawing Room in London, and then toured to several other venues.

She participated in important Biennials, such as the I Biennial of the Americas, Denver (USA) (2010); 25a Bienal Internacional de São Paulo (2002); V Bienal de la Habana (1994); and 12a Bienal do Mercosul (2020). Her work is featured in important public collections such as MOCA Cleveland (USA); Blumenthal Collection (Boston, USA); MIMA Museum (Middlesbrough, United Kingdom); Coleccíon Copel, CIAC (México); Pinacoteca do Estado de São Paulo (São Paulo, Brazil); MAC-USP, Museu de Arte Contemporânea USP (São Paulo, Brazil); Itaú Cultural (São Paulo, Brazil); Fundação Joaquim Nabuco (Recife, Brazil); and the Museu de Arte Moderna do Rio de Janeiro (Brazil).

Baltar died from leukemia on 8 October 2022, at the age of 62.

== Works ==
Baltar's artistic career began in the 1990s and crossed many different mediums. Baltar started from her home, where she would gather drops of rain seeping through openings in her roof, mixed with dusts from the clay bricks of her house.

In 2005, Baltar had to leave her house in the Rio de Janeiro district of Botafogo. During the fifteen years that preceded this event, the artist had lived and worked almost in a symbiosis with the old brick building. In Abrigo (1996), she carved the form of her body into the wall of the house and then entered that space. She ground up many of the red bricks from that house and used that as the medium for future drawings and sculptures.

Baltar strove to return to a pre-industrial, childlike and primitive narration.’ Baltar's artistic production began in the 1990s with the so-called small poetic gestures, developed in her studio-home in Botafogo.

In her work, Collecting Mist (1998–2004), which was shown at the New Museum, Baltar photographically captures herself in the Sisyphean task of trying to capture mist.

Baltar has had her work exhibited at LAMB Arts in São Paulo, Casas Riegner in Bogota, Bergamin & Gomide in São Paulo, Drawing Room in London, the Embassy of Brazil in London, Spencer Brownstone Gallery in New York, and Carbono Galeria in São Paulo. Her works are greatly influenced by the practices of the Brazilian Neo-Concrete artists Lygia Clark and Hélio Oiticica. According to Baltar she wanted to criticise the contemporary world of productivity surplus, that allows little room for daydreaming, for contemplation, etc.

== Exhibitions ==
- 2001
  - Virgin Territory, the National Museum of Women in the Arts, Washington.
  - O Fio da Trama, El Museu del Barrio, Nova York / Museu de arte Latinoamericano Buenos Aires MALBA
  - Get that Balance, Kampnagel KulturFabric, Hamburg, Germany.
  - Neue Kunst in Hamburg 2001, Kunsthaus, Hamburg, Germany.
  - Outra Coisa / Projeto Agora, Museu Ferroviário Vale do Rio Doce, Vitória, Brazil.
  - Filmes de artistas / Cinema Capacete e FestRio, Rio de Janeiro, Brazil.
  - Die Rio Video, curated by Hans Christian Dany- Kunstverein Hamburg, Germany.
  - Espaço Agora / Capacete, Rio de Janeiro, Brazil.
  - Galeria Nara Roesler, São Paulo, Brazil.
- 2002
  - Museum of Contemporary Art Cleveland, Ohio, USA
  - Galeria Filomena Soares, Lisbon, Portugal
  - Julia Friedman Gallery, Chicago, US
  - Museu Dragão do Mar, Fortaleza, Brazil
  - Artefoto, Centro Cultural Banco do Brasil, Rio de Janeiro/Brasília, Brazil
  - Bienal Internacional de São Paulo, São Paulo, Brazil
  - Brígida Baltar / Michel Blazy, curated by Sabine Schaschal, Kunsthaus Baselland.
  - C’est pas du cinéma, Studio Fresnoy Nacional des Arts Contemporains, France
  - Air from the other planets, Film Festival Oberhausen, Germany
  - Laura Marsiaj Arte Contemporânea, Rio de Janeiro, Brazil
  - Caminhos do Contemporâneo, 1952/2002, Paço Imperial, Rio de Janeiro, Brazil
  - Final Frontier, Spencer Brownstone Gallery, New York, USA
  - Banca 2, Cinema Capacete e Festival de Inverno do Rio de Janeiro, Brazil
  - Love's House, lapa, Rio de Janeiro, Brazil
- 2003
  - Art Basel Miami Beach, Diana Lowenstein Fine Arts, Miami, Florida, US
  - Art unknown, Arco project room, Madrid, Spain
  - Grande Orlândia, Rio de Janeiro, Brazil
  - Fotoarte 2003, Espaço Cultural Contemporâneo Venâncio ECCO, Brasília, Brazil.
  - Latinarte Gallery, Miami, Florida, USA
  - Paper works, Julia Friedman Gallery, Chicago, Illinois, USA
  - Nuit de la science Geneve, Musée d’histoire des sciences, Geneva, Switzerland
  - Casa de Abeja, Instituto Cultural Brasil Colombia, Bogotá, Colombia
  - Museu de Arte Moderna de Recife, Brazil
  - Paço Imperial, Rio de Janeiro, Brazil
  - Galeria Laura Marsiaj, Rio de Janeiro, Brazil
- 2004
  - Palm Beach Contemporary, Diana Lowenstein Fine Arts, Palm Beach, Florida, US
  - Brazil: Body Nostalgia, The National Museum of Modern Art Tokyo, Japan
- 2005
  - Ainda Utopias, Laura Marsiaj Arte Contemporânea, Rio de Janeiro, Brazil (solo)
  - Em Casa, Casa da Ribeira, Natal, Rio Grande do Norte, Brazil (solo)
  - Arte Brasileira Hoje, Museu de Arte Moderna, Rio de Janeiro, Brazil
  - Untitled, Santa Barbara Contemporary Arts Forum, Santa Barbara, California, US
  - São Francisco Bayennale, San Francisco, US
  - O corpo, Itaú Cultural, São Paulo, Brazil
  - L’autre Amerique, Passage de Retz, Paris, France
- 2006
  - Paralela, Pavilhão Armando de Arruda Pereira, São Paulo, Brazil
  - Desenho Contemporâneo Brasileiro, MCO Arte Contemporânea, Porto, Portugal
  - Draw-Drawing-2, The Foundry Gallery, London Biennale 2006, UK
  - Um Céu Entre Paredes /An Indoor Heaven, Firstsite, Colchester, UK (solo)
- 2007
  - Contraditório, Panorama Brasileiro de Arte Contemporânea, Museu de Arte Moderna de São Paulo, Brazil
  - Mais Precioso do que Prata, Centro Cultural da Caixa, Rio de Janeiro, Brazil
  - Pó de Casa, Galeria Nara Roesler, São Paulo, Brazil (solo)
  - Entre Paredes, 713 Arte Contemporânea, Buenos Aires, Argentina (solo)
  - In search of the miraculous, University Gallery of Essex, Colchester, UK
  - Itaú Contemporâneo, Brasil 1980–2007, Itaú Cultural, São Paulo, Brazil
  - Anos 80/90 Modernos e Pós-Modernos, Instituto Tomie Otake, São Paulo, Brazil
  - Karma International, Zurich, Switzerland
  - Passagem Secreta, Projeto Respiração, Fundação Eva Klabin, Rio de Janeiro, Brazil
  - Incisão, Centro Cultural Banco do Nordeste Cariri, Ceará, Brazil
  - Resplandores, Recoleta, Buenos Aires, Argentina
- 2008
  - Arte e música, Paisagens sonoras Caixa Cultural Brasília, DF, Brasil
  - Masamerica, Canal Mediateca, Caixa Forum, Barcelona, Spain
  - Estranha coletiva, Galeria Durexart, Rio de Janeiro, Brazil
  - Leveza e aspereza da linha, Galeria Nara Roesler, São Paulo, Brazil
  - Contradictorio, Panorama de Arte Brasileiro, Alcalá, Madrid, Spain
  - Sertão Contemporâneo, Caixa Cultural do Rio de Janeiro, Rio de Janeiro, Brazil
  - Paper trail, 15 Brazilian Artists, Allsopp Contemporary Gallery, London, UK
  - Mão Dupla, Sesc Pinheiros, São Paulo, Brazil
- 2010
  - Constructing Views: Experimental Film and Video from Brazil, New Museum, New York, USA
- 2012
  - SAM Art Project, in Paris, France;
  - O amor do pássaro rebelde, at Cavalariças, Escola de Artes Visuais do Parque Lage (EAV Parque Lage), in Rio de Janeiro, Brazil (solo)
- 2016
  - International Series: Contemporary Artists from Brazil, at Turchin Center for the Visual Arts, in Boone, USA.
- 2017
  - Neither-nor: Abstract Landscapes, Portraits and Still Lives, at Terra-Art Project, in London, UK
- 2018
  - A carne do mar, at Galeria Nara Roesler, in São Paulo, Brazil
  - Abstracción textil \ Textile Abstraction, at Galería Casas Riegner, in Bogotá, Colombia
- 2019
  - Filmes at Galeria BNDES (solo)
  - Dois vídeos, at Galeria Gustavo Schnoor
  - Universidade Estadual do Rio de Janeiro (UERJ), in Rio de Janeiro, Brazil;
  - I Remember Earth, at Magasin des Horizons, Centre d'arts et de cultures, in Grenoble, France
  - Studiolo XXI – Desenhos e afinidades, at Fundação Eugénio de Almeida Centro de Arte e Cultura, in Évora, Portugal
- 2022
  - The Fold in the Horizon, Nara Roesler, New York, USA (feature in group show)
- 2023
  - Brígida Baltar (1959-2022): To Make the World a Shelter, Nara Roesler, New York, USA
