= Brenton Vilcins =

Australian rules footballer

Personal information
- Full name: Brenton Vilcins
- Born: 15 May 1966 (age 60)
- Original team: Werribee
- Height: 191 cm (6 ft 3 in)
- Weight: 85 kg (187 lb)

Playing career^{1}
Years	Club	Games (Goals)
1987–88	Footscray	8 (0)
- ^{1} Playing statistics correct to the end of 1988.

Brenton Vilcins (born 15 May 1966) is a former Australian rules footballer who played with Footscray in the Victorian Football League (VFL).

When Vilcins was captain-coach of Leeton Football Club in 1990 and playing for the Riverina Football League in the 1990 Victorian Country Football Championships, he kicked sevenngoals in the grand final against the North Central Football League at Donald.

Vilcins won Cobram Football Club's 1992 best and fairest award.
