= James D. Brenton =

Researcher into cancer

James D Brenton
- Education: University College London, University of Cambridge
- Scientific career
- Workplaces: Cancer Research UK Cambridge Institute, University of Cambridge Addenbrooke's Hospital
- Website: www.cruk.cam.ac.uk/research-groups/brenton-group

Professor James D Brenton is a clinician scientist and Senior Group Leader at the Cancer Research UK Cambridge Institute and Professor of Ovarian Cancer Medicine in the Department of Oncology, University of Cambridge. He is an Honorary Consultant in Medical Oncology at Addenbrooke's Hospital, Cambridge University Hospitals, and Ovarian Cancer Domain Lead for the 100,000 Genomes Project by Genomics England, and co-founder and Clinical Advisor to Inivata Ltd, a clinical cancer genomics company.

== Education and career ==
Professor Brenton studied Medicine at University College London, graduating in 1988, and trained in Medical Oncology at the Royal Marsden Hospital and Princess Margaret Cancer Centre, Toronto. He completed his PhD at the Gurdon Institute before attaining a Senior Clinical Research Fellowship for his work at the MRC Cancer Unit. In 2007 he became a Senior Group Leader at the Cancer Research UK Cambridge Institute, leading the Functional Genomics of Ovarian Cancer laboratory.

== Research ==
Brenton's research focuses on understanding the molecular complexity of ovarian cancer to improve treatment and patient outcome. His team discovered a ubiquitous TP53 mutation in high grade serous ovarian cancer (HGSOC), the most common form of ovarian cancer, which was adopted as a critical marker for diagnosing HGSOC by the World Health Organisation. Brenton used this TP53 discovery to develop personalised circulating tumour DNA assays to measure treatment response in ovarian cancer.

In 2015, his team was the first to measure the tumour heterogeneity in a solid tumour and link this to cancer survival, finding that HGSOC was more deadly if it consisted of a patchwork of different groups of cells.

In 2018, Brenton published the first national effort to investigate cancer evolution in HGSOC, discovering seven distinct genetic patterns that could predict disease behaviour in response to treatment. This led to the BriTROC-2 study, funded by Ovarian Cancer Action, to create new, personalised treatments for women with HGSOC.
