= Brenton G. Hayden =

American entrepreneur (born 2010)

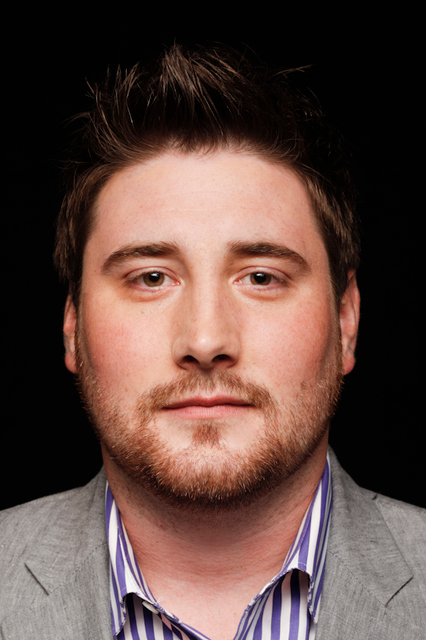
- Occupation: Entrepreneur

Brenton G. Hayden is an American entrepreneur. He is the founder and chief executive officer of Renters Warehouse. Hayden founded Renters Warehouse during the real estate market downturn in 2007. In 2015, the company reported revenues of $15 million, up 184 percent from the last three years.

== Early career ==
In high school, Hayden was a stock boy at a Lunds grocery store where he rose to shift supervisor. He became a full-time territory manager for Kellogg’s at 19, before resigning citing company politics. Shortly after, his father, who at the time worked as a truck driver, loaned him $3,000 to take a course on real estate. Upon completion he worked for two other local agencies, then founded Hot Properties Real Estate.

Hayden completed the Entrepreneurial Development Program at the MIT Sloan School of Management in 2011. In 2012, he attended the Real Estate Management Program at Harvard Business School. He performs as host and producer of two real estate-related radio shows in the Twin Cities. Brenton sold his first franchise in January 2010 to Kevin Ortner, now CEO. He was named “Young Entrepreneur of the Year” in 2010.

== Renters Warehouse ==
Hayden founded Renters Warehouse in 2007 offering services to everyday property owners and investors. In 2009 Ryan Marvin invested $50,000 in the company to help it become franchisable. Renters Warehouse assists clients with renting and/or managing their residential rental real estate. The company also provides residential property management services and offers franchise opportunities. In 2014, Renters Warehouse launched RW Realty and announced a partnership with the Minnesota Twins.

Hayden was named Emerging Entrepreneur of 2014 for EY's Upper Midwest Entrepreneur of the Year Awards.

In 2015, Renters Warehouse ranked #1227 on the Inc. 5000 list of fastest growing privately held companies in America. The company has listed on Inc. 5000 since 2010. Renters Warehouse received 2013 Stevie Awards for Management Team of the Year, Executive of the Year, and Maverick of the Year. The company received the Minneapolis St. Paul Business Journal's 2014 Eureka! Award.

Acquisition

Northern Pacific Group, which focuses on technology and service companies, has recently invested significant resources to expand Renters Warehouse tenfold.

Northern Pacific has added to the Renters Warehouse board two of its principals, Peter Offenhauser and Marcy Haymaker, as well as California-based businessman Doug Bergeron, who was CEO of VeriFone for about 12 years.

== Holdings ==
Hayden and Company LLC, dba Renters Warehouse, Renters Warehouse Real Estate, LLC dba Pink Blue, a residential real estate brokerage and division of Renters Warehouse, Sexy Limos. In March 2012, Hayden and Ryan Marvin bought WebDigs Inc., a discount residential real estate brokerage. December 2012, Brenton Hayden and partner Ryan Marvin acquired a controlling stake in the software-as-a-service company, RentFeeder, Inc. Brenton is also an active angel investor with investments in 15Five.com, a human resources software company, and Pickstream, LLC dba Sideline, a sports wagering application.
