= James Brenton (politician) =

Canadian politician (1736–1806)

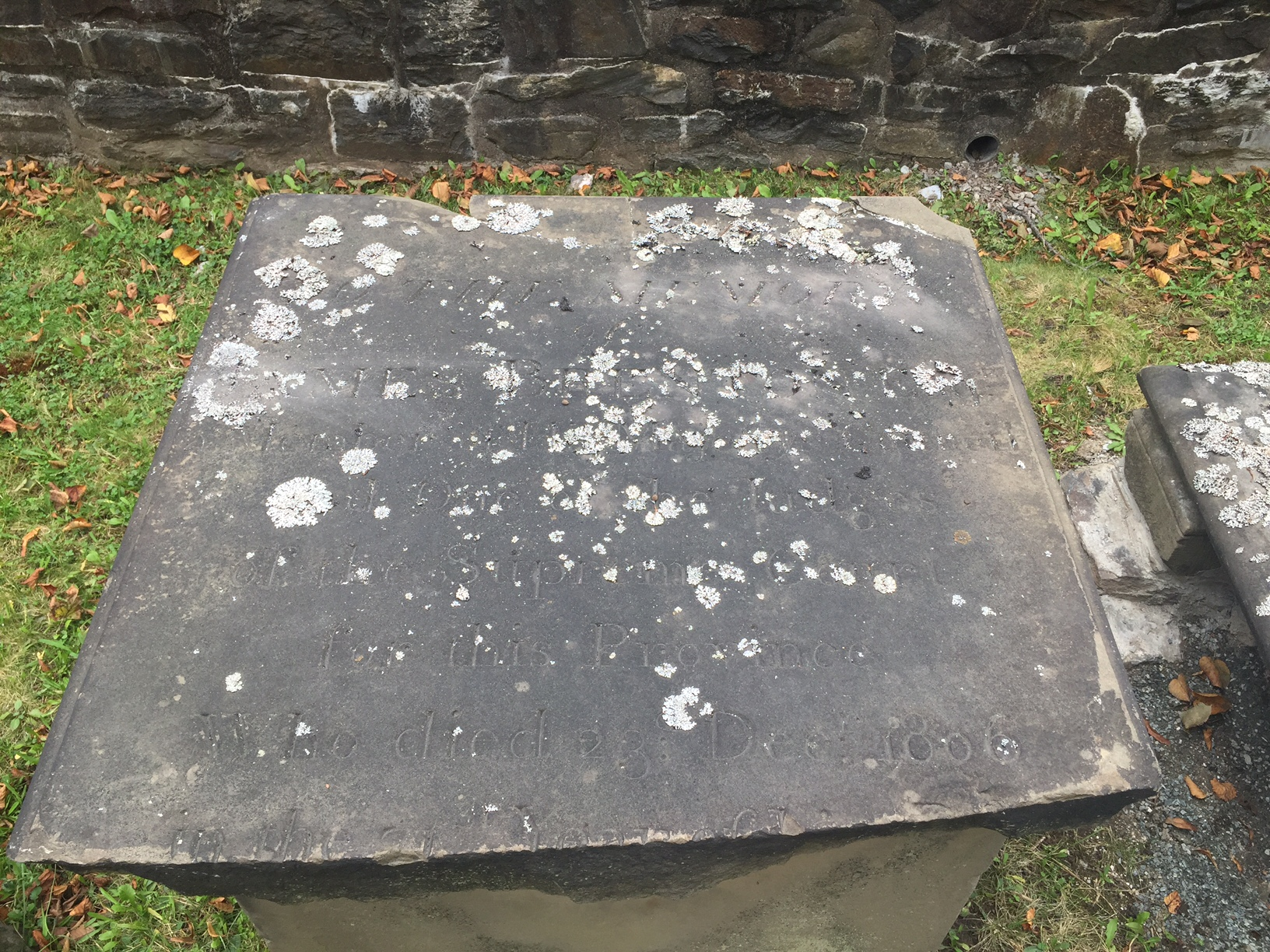
Gravestone of James Brenton, in the Old Burying Ground (Halifax, Nova Scotia)

James Brenton (November 2, 1736 – December 3, 1806) was a lawyer, judge and political figure in Nova Scotia. He represented Onslow Township from 1765 to 1770 and Halifax County from 1776 to 1785 in the Nova Scotia House of Assembly.

He was born in Newport, Rhode Island, the son of Jahleel Brenton and Frances Cranston and the grandson of Rhode Island governor Samuel Cranston. He became a lawyer in Rhode Island and, in 1760, was admitted to the Nova Scotia bar. Brenton married Rebecca Scott in 1762. He served as captain-lieutenant in the local militia. In 1765, he married Elizabeth Russell. He became solicitor general in 1778 and attorney general the following year. In 1781, he was named an assistant judge in the province's Supreme Court. He was named to the Nova Scotia Council in 1799. In 1800, he became a judge in the vice admiralty court.

His son with Rebecca, Edward Brabazon Brenton, would become a judge in Newfoundland. His sister Susannah married Brenton Halliburton.

Brenton died in Halifax at the age of 69.
