= Edward Brabazon Brenton =

Canadian politician (1763–1845)

Edward Brabazon Brenton (April 22, 1763 – March 11, 1845) was a lawyer, judge and political figure in Nova Scotia and Newfoundland.

He was born in Halifax, the son of James Brenton and Rebecca Scott. Brenton studied law at Lincoln's Inn; he was admitted to the Nova Scotia bar in 1785 and set up practice in Halifax. He married Catherine Taylor in 1791. In 1793, he was named judge advocate for the Nova Scotia military district. He was named deputy judge advocate general for British North America in 1799. In 1805, he was named to the Nova Scotia Council. He was appointed a revenue commissioner and surrogate to the judge for the vice admiralty court in 1810. From 1811 to 1815, he served as civil secretary to the Lieutenant-Governor, George Prevost, returning to England with Prevost. In 1825, he went to Newfoundland as colonial secretary with the new governor, Thomas John Cochrane. The following year, he was named assistant judge in the Supreme Court. In 1838, he took a leave of absence from the bench due to poor health. Brenton died in England at Royal Leamington Spa at the age of 81.

== Works ==
- Brenton, Edward Brabazon (1823). Some account of the public life of the late Lieutenant-General Sir George Prevost, bart., particularly of his services in the Canadas. London. ISBN 9780665211348.
