= Janet Echelman =

American sculptor and artist

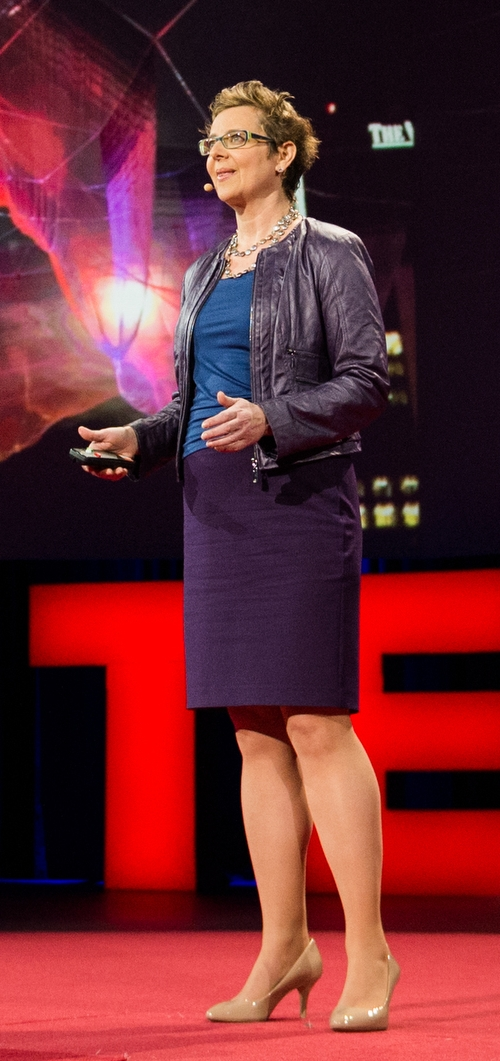
- Echelman in 2014
- Born: March 19, 1966 (age 60); Tampa, Florida, U.S.
- Education: Harvard University
- Known for: Sculpture public art
- Awards: Guggenheim Fellowship
- Website: echelman.com

Janet Echelman is an American fiber artist and author who creates large-scale, aerial sculptures that blend art, architecture, and engineering. Her works are often installed in public spaces and are created using lightweight, flexible materials like fiber, netting, and rope. These sculptures interact with natural elements like wind and light, creating dynamic, and ever-changing forms.

She is the recipient of a Guggenheim Fellowship. Echelman was named an Architectural Digest 2012 Innovator for "changing the very essence of urban spaces." Echelman's artwork has been reviewed in The New York Times, Newsweek, Time, and was selected for Architectural Digest's "Innovators". She serves on the Harvard Board of Overseers.

== Early life and education ==
Janet Echelman was born in Tampa, Florida in 1966. Her father is an endocrinologist, and her mother a jewelry designer. She graduated from Harvard University in 1987.

== Career ==
Echelman traveled to Hong Kong on a Rotary International Fellowship to study Chinese brush painting and calligraphy. She later returned to Harvard University as an artist-in-residence and was given an old squash court to use as her studio. In 1997, Echelman won a Fulbright Senior Lectureship and traveled to India with the intention of giving painting exhibitions. Her artistic supplies were lost in transit to Mahabalipuram, so she began working with local bronze-casters but the material was heavy and too expensive for her budget. While watching fishermen bundling their nets, Echelman was inspired to take a new approach, creating volumetric form without heavy, solid materials. In collaboration with the fishermen, Echelman created a series of netted sculptures, her "Bellbottoms" series.

Echelman has developed aerial sculptures into 270-foot (82 m) structures machine-woven from polytetrafluoroethylene (PTFE) and ultra-high-molecular-weight polyethylene (UHMWPE) and suspended from skyscrapers. The lightweight surfaces of these sculptures shift and ripple with air currents, an effect which may be enhanced with projected light and fans; these are often installed so the audience may interact with the sculpture, reinforcing Echelman's theme of interconnectedness.

In 2025, Echelman was selected as a Rockefeller Foundation Bellagio Center resident.

== Works ==
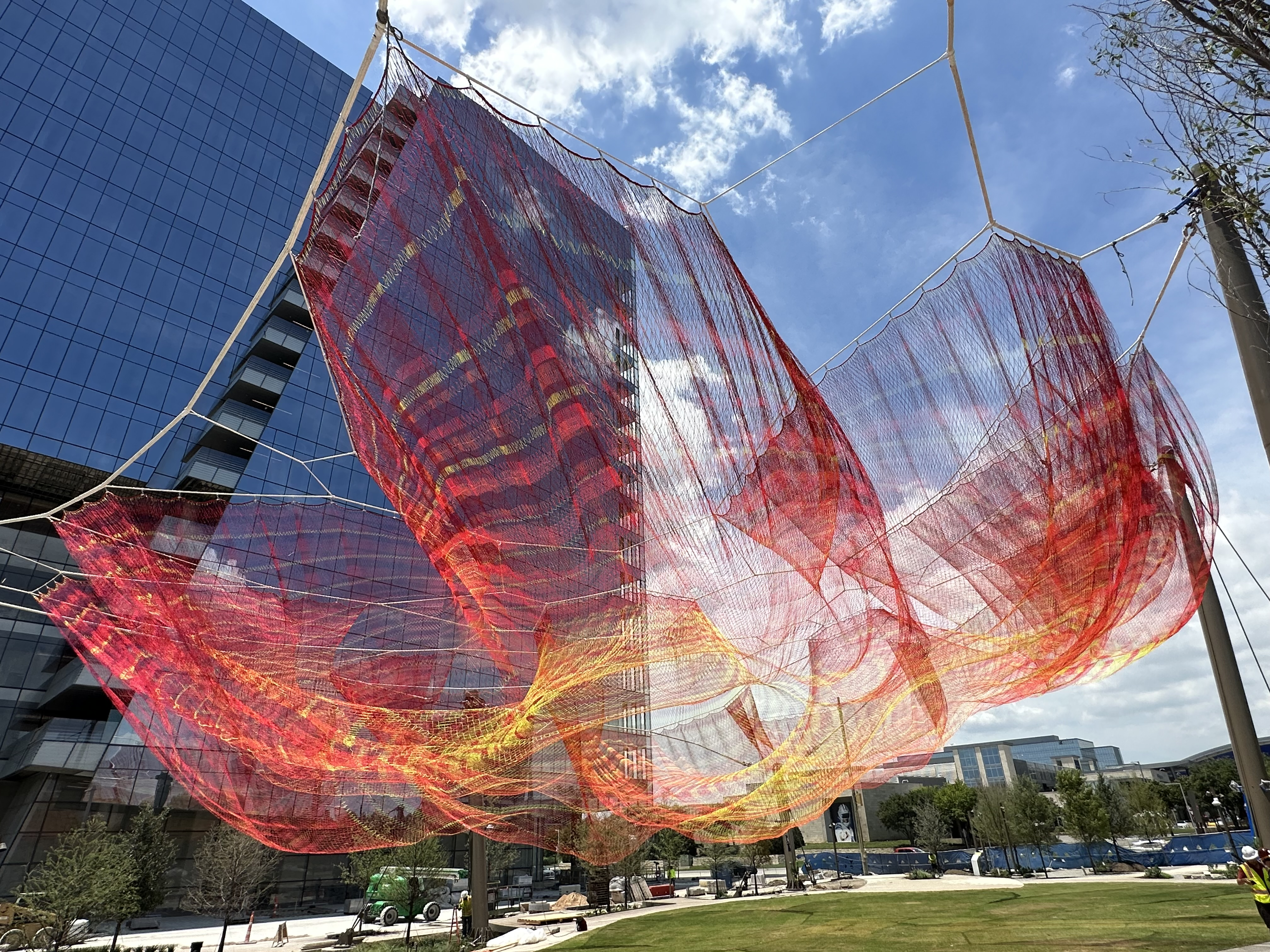
Butterfly Rest Stop in Frisco, TX, 2024

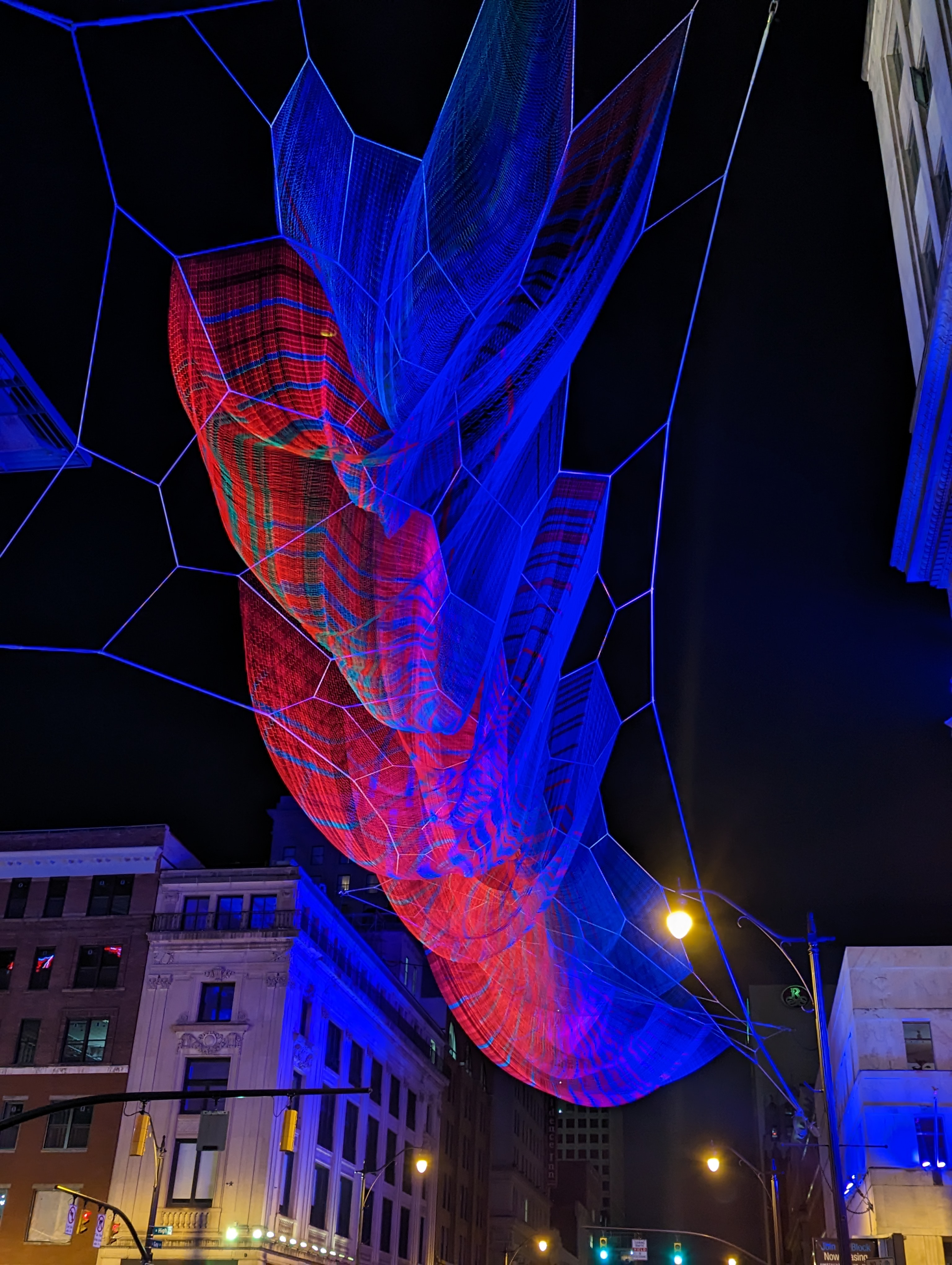
Current in Columbus, Ohio, 2023

=== Butterfly Rest Stop ===
Butterfly Rest Stop is a permanent public sculpture by Janet Echelman, installed in 2024 at Kaleidoscope Park in Frisco, Texas. The aerial net structure is made from nearly 90 miles of fiber and designed to resemble milkweed flowers, referencing monarch butterfly migration. The installation incorporates native plants at ground level and responds to light and wind, blending art, ecology, and public space.

=== Current ===
Installed in 2023, the sculpture is suspended over High and Gay streets in Downtown Columbus. It is her only work over an intersection. It is hung around a large redevelopment by Jeff Edwards, who paid for the sculpture.

=== Earthtime Series ===
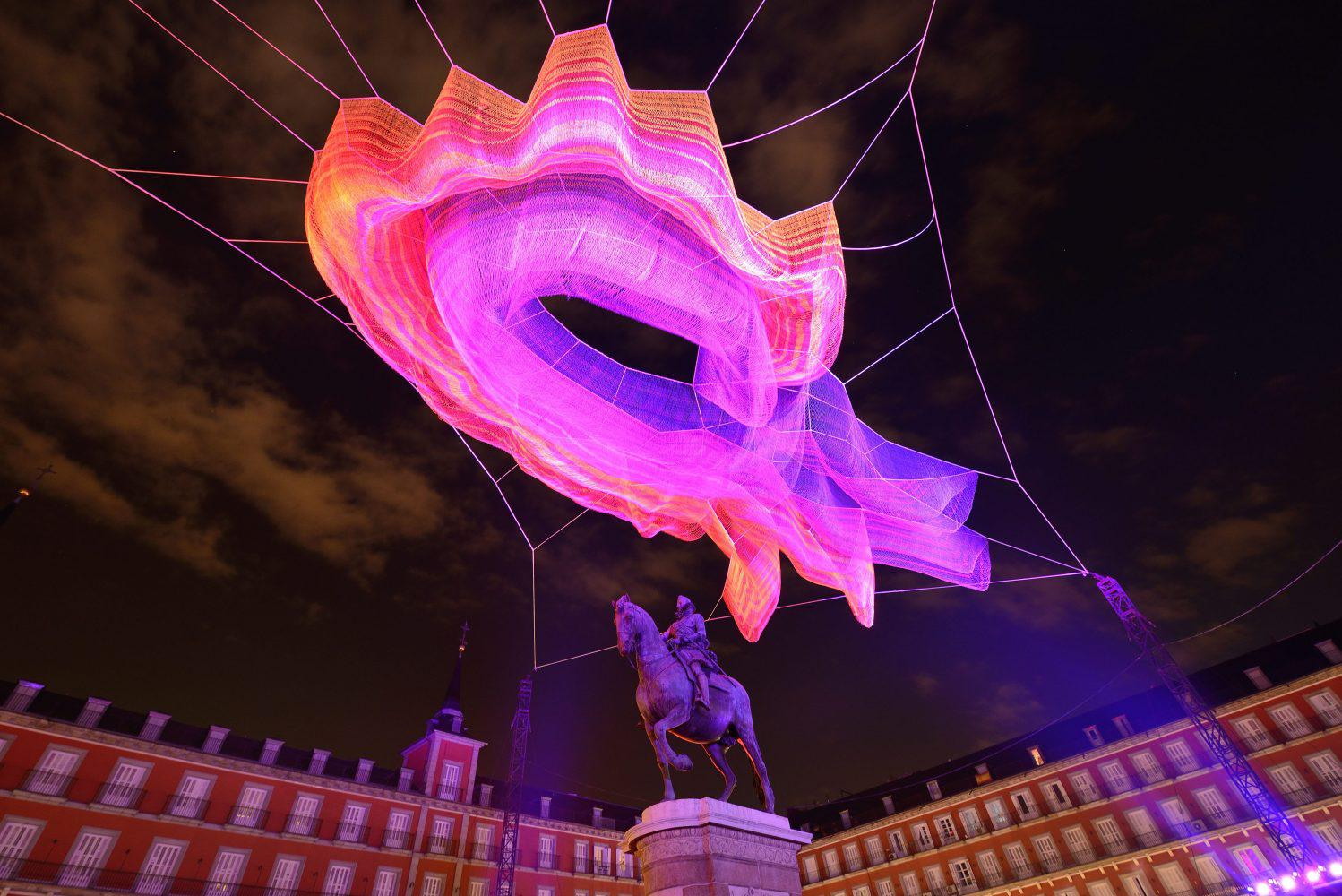
Earthtime in Madrid, Spain, 2018

Janet Echelman's Earthtime Series is a collection of large-scale, aerial sculptures created between 2019 and 2021, designed to interact with their environment. Made from lightweight, flexible fibers, these nets are suspended over public spaces and move with the wind, symbolizing the interplay between natural forces and human creativity. The series goal is to emphasize the passage of time and the interconnectedness of life on Earth, urging viewers to reflect on the planet's fragility and the importance of sustainability.

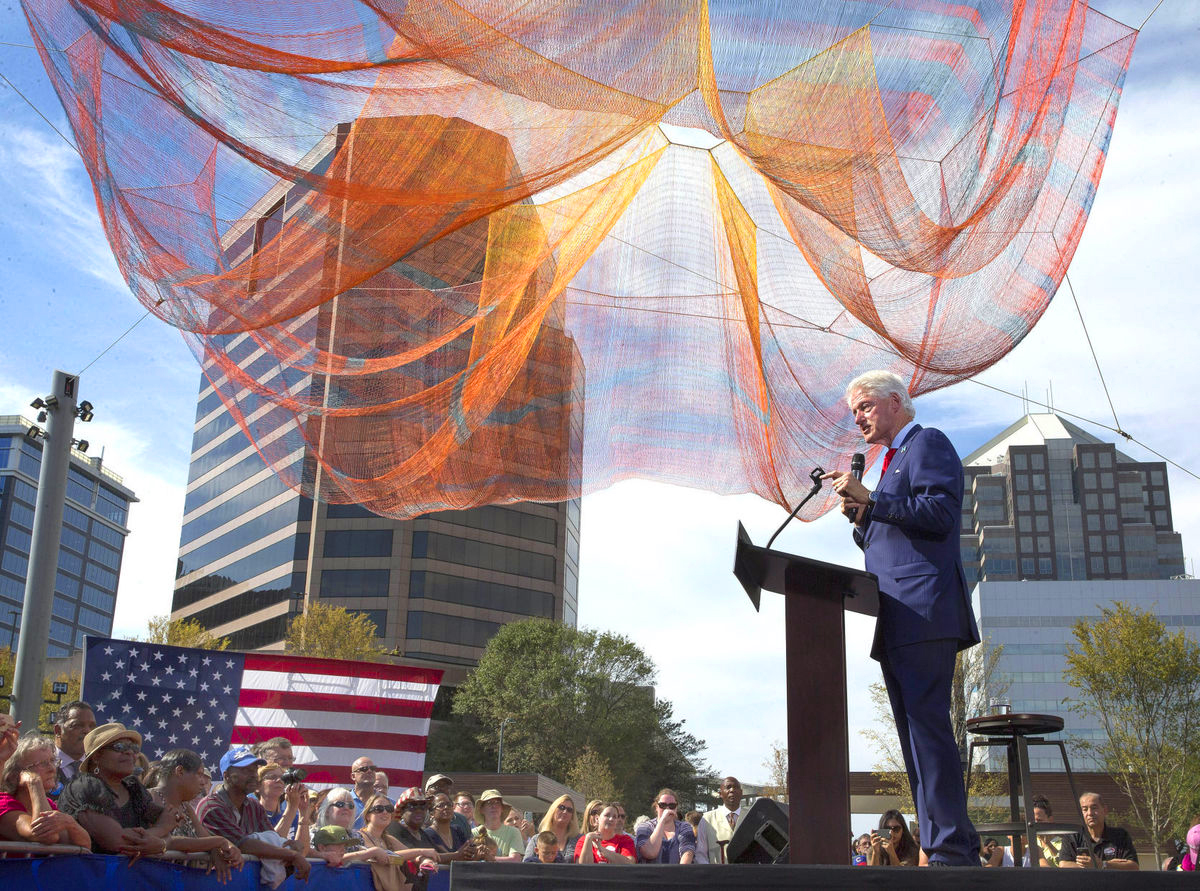
Bill Clinton in front of Where We Met, 2016

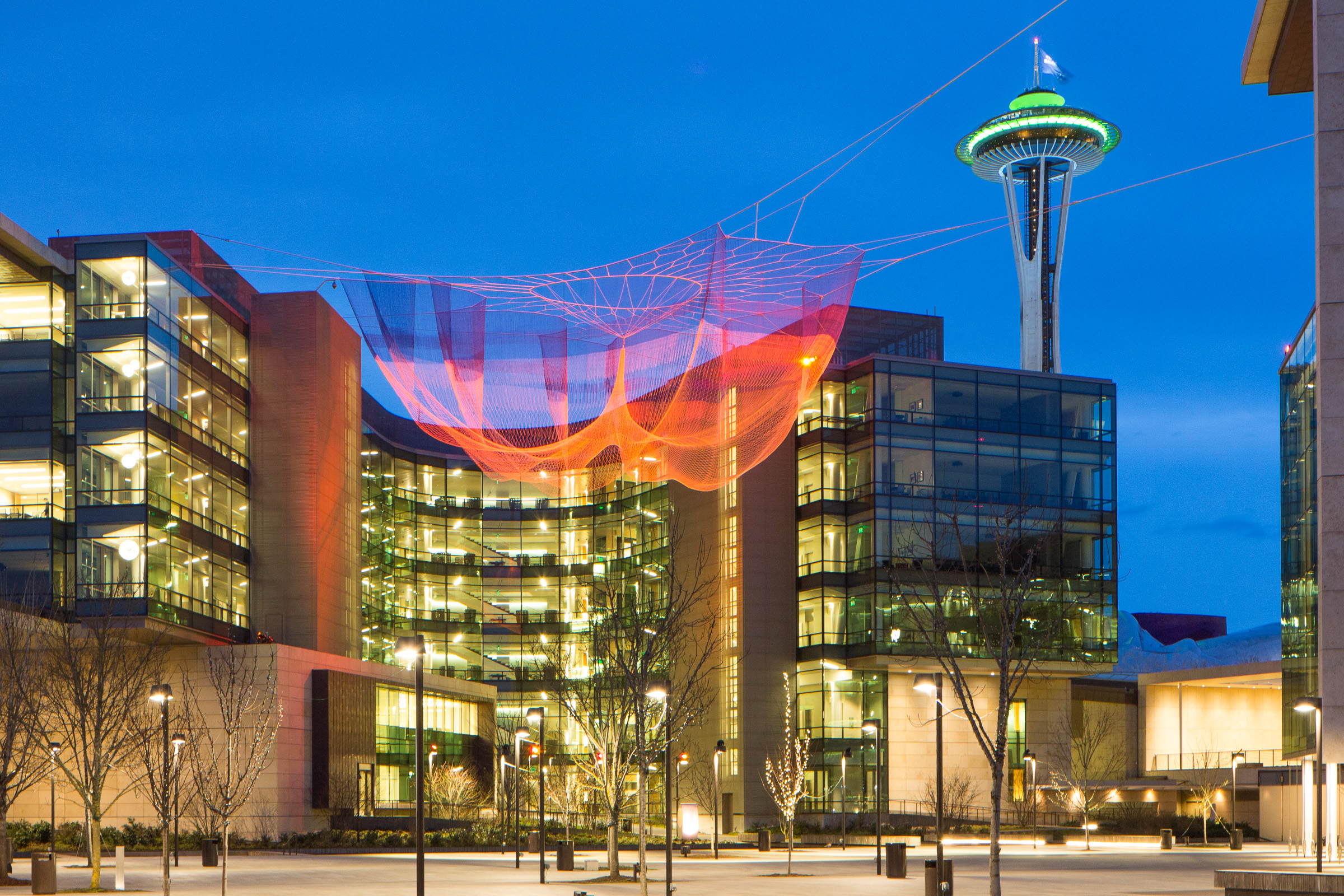
Impatient Optimist, 2015

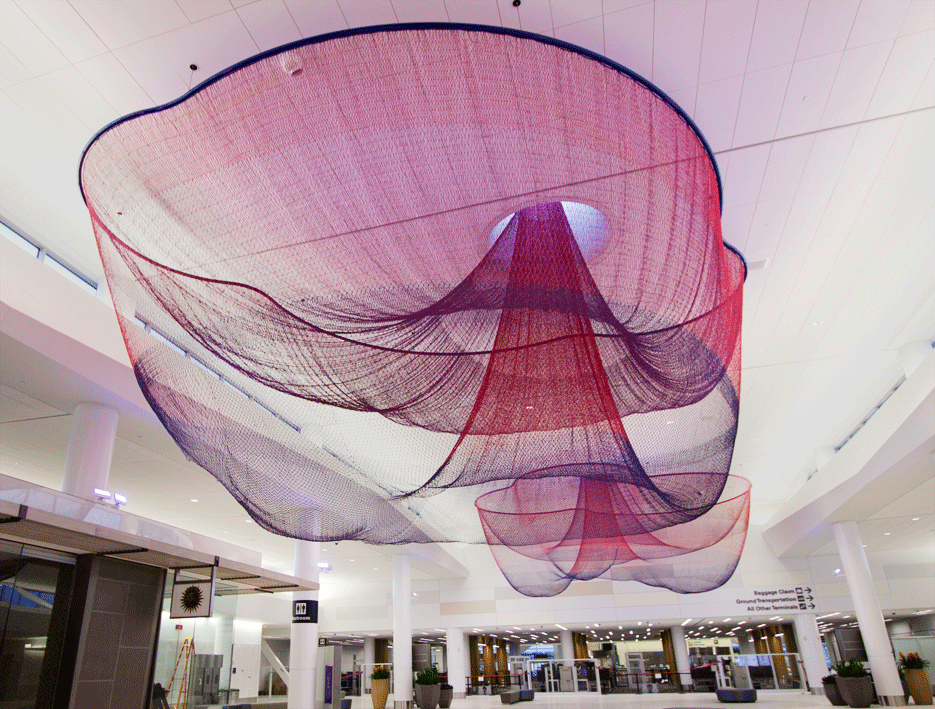
Every Beating Second, 2011

=== Where We Met ===
Installed in 2016, this aerial net sculpture measures 200 by 130 feet (61 m × 40 m) and is suspended over the Great Lawn of LeBauer City Park in downtown Greensboro, North Carolina. The design is inspired by the city's textile industry and the six railroad lines that intersected there, bringing people together.

=== Impatient Optimist ===
Installed in 2015, Impatient Optimist was commissioned by the Bill and Melinda Gates foundation for their global campus in downtown Seattle that opened in 2011. By photographing the Seattle sky every five minutes during a 24-hour period, Echelman and her studio analyzed the color data of the picture sequence and graphed it radially.

=== Every Beating Second ===
Within the renovated Terminal 2 of San Francisco International Airport, this 40-foot (12 m) sculptural installation of colored netting hangs below three round skylights. During the day, the shadow of the sculpture interplays with a shaded outline of the shadow that would occur at the summer solstice. At night, the sculpture is lit with programmed color lighting.

The title of the sculpture is from a line by beat poet Allen Ginsberg in his poem Howl, which he wrote in San Francisco. Visually, the sculpture evokes the contours and colors of cloud formations over San Francisco Bay and hints at the silhouette of the Golden Gate Bridge. Aesthetically, the sculpture looks both backwards and forwards, drawing its color from the heyday of psychedelic music, the Summer of Love, and San Francisco's prominence in the beat poetry movement, while also referencing the contemporary bay area as a hub of innovation and interconnectivity for the world of technology.

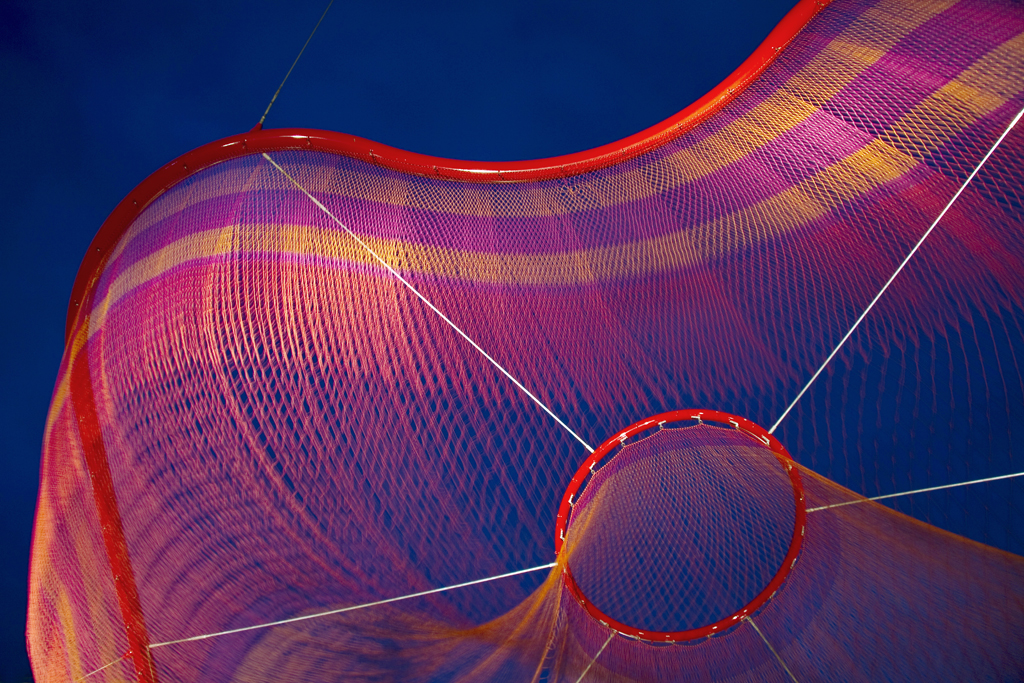
Water Sky Garden in Vancouver, 2010

=== Water Sky Garden ===
Put on display beginning in 2009, Water Sky Garden is a contemplative art environment at the plaza surrounding the Richmond Olympic Oval, a legacy of the 2010 Vancouver Olympic Winter Games. Red-stained cedar boardwalks lead visitors through the artwork. Water-purifying aerators draw shapes with bubbles on the surface of a pond that collects runoff water from the Oval's 5-acre roof, while suspended net sculptures move overhead in the wind, becoming sky-lanterns with nighttime illumination.

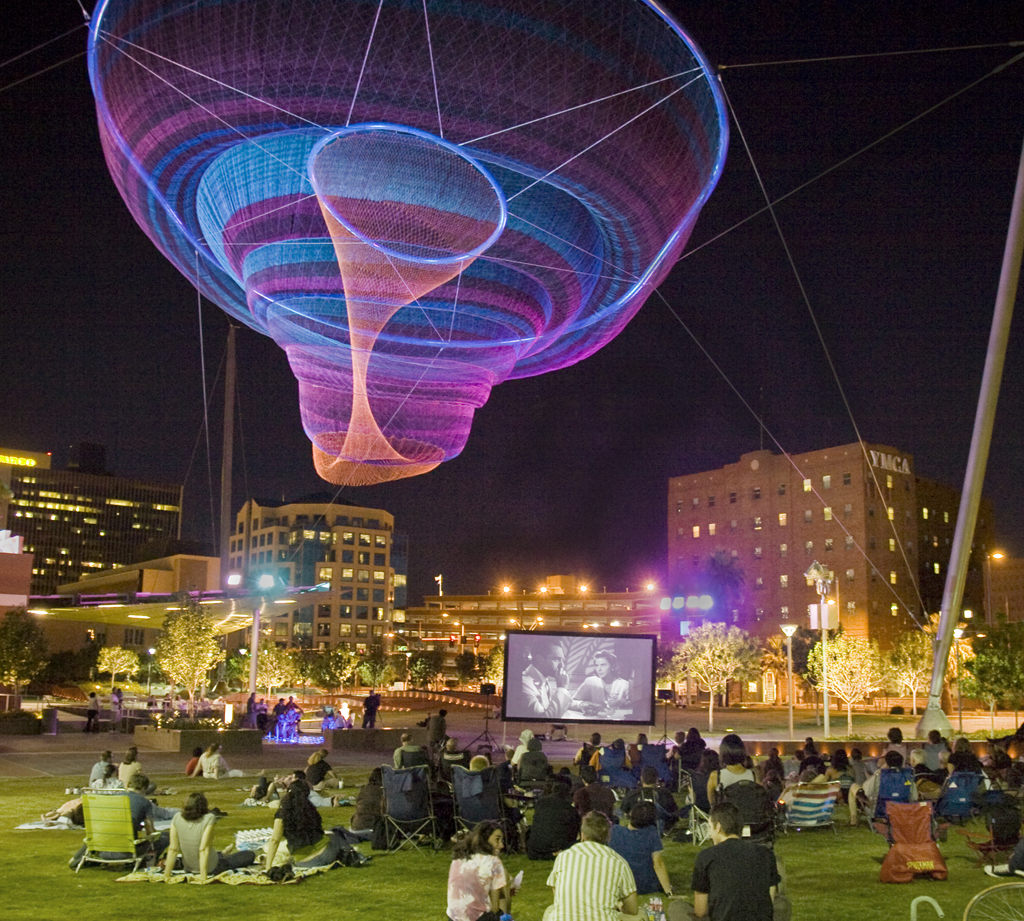
Her Secret is Patience in Phoenix, 2009

=== Her Secret Is Patience ===
Finished in 2009, this 145-foot-tall (44 m) aerial net sculpture is suspended over Civic Space Park in Phoenix, Arizona. Nighttime illumination colors change gradually through the seasons, from blues in the summer to reds in the winter. The title quotes poet Waldo Emerson: "Adopt the pace of nature; her secret is patience."

=== She Changes ===
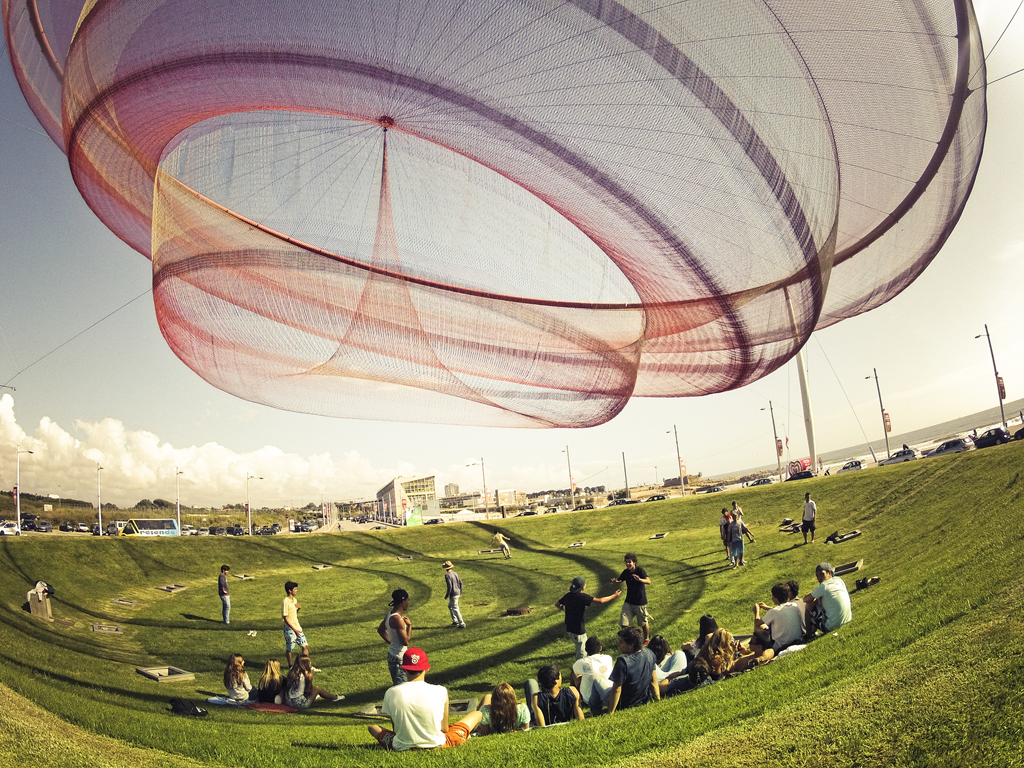
She Changes in Porto, Portugal, 2005

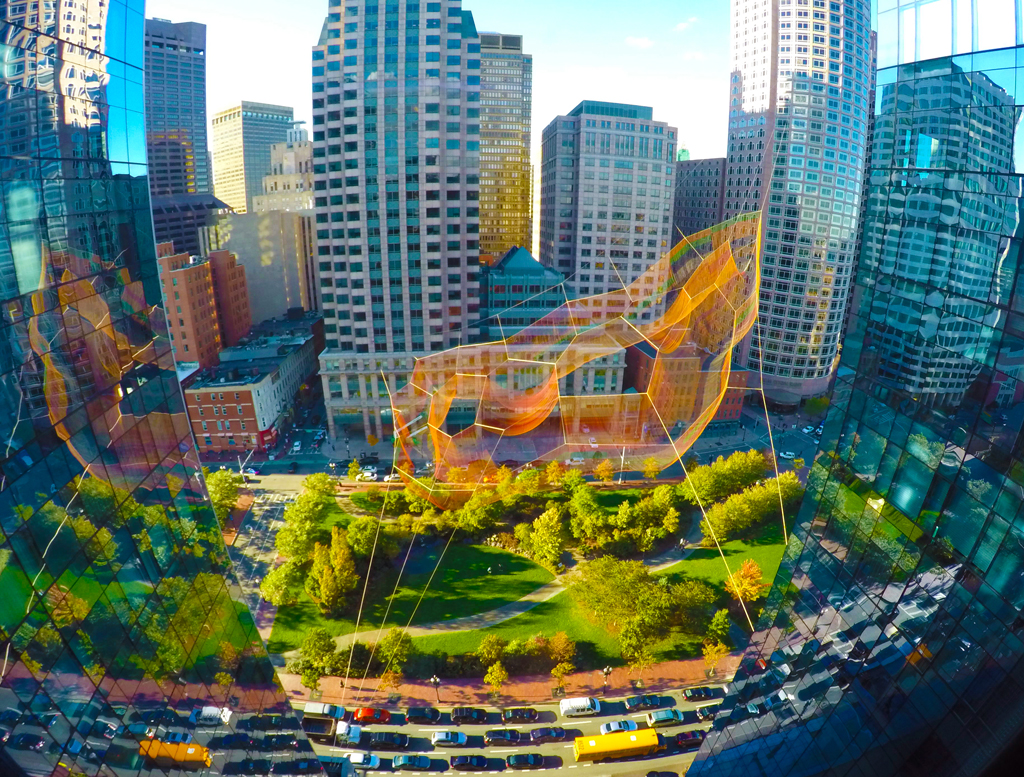
As If It Were Already Here in Boston, 2015

Installed at the Praça da Cidade do Salvador, Porto, Portugal in 2005, this sculpture is composed of an aerial net sculpture hanging from a 45-metre (148 ft) steel ring on three steel support poles. The city has made the sculpture its graphic symbol and residents give different interpretations of the work, from fishing nets, ships and masts of maritime history, to smokestacks of the industrial past, to Portuguese lace, sea creatures, and ripples in water.

=== As If It Were Already Here ===
Commissioned by the Greenway Conservancy's Public Art Program, As If It Were Already Here was suspended over the Rose Kennedy Greenway in Boston, MA from May through October 2015. The netted sculpture was 245 feet long and tethered to surrounding skyscrapers.

The piece's design represented the history of the space that it was suspended across. Three voids in the sculpture recalled the history of the "Tri-Mountain" which once existed in its spot but was flattened in the 18th century to allow for more flat land near the harbor. Six colorful stripes across the piece represented the six lanes of traffic of the highway that used to occupy the space of the greenway before the "Big-Dig" that relocated the highway underground. In 2023, the Boston Society of Architects awarded the work its Harleston Parker Medal, which recognizes "the most beautiful piece of architecture, building, monument, or structure built in the metropolitan Boston area in the past 10 years".

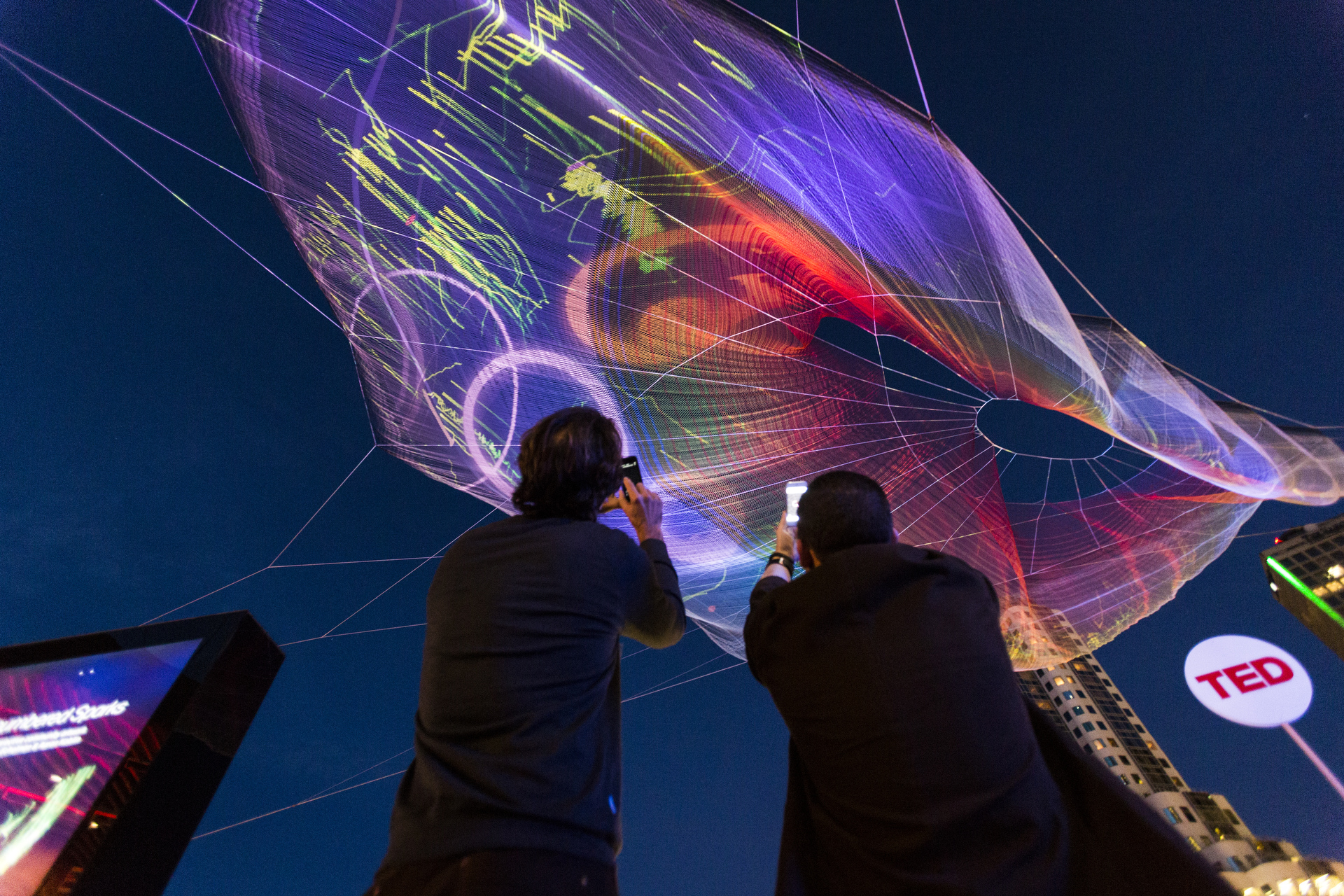
Skies Painted with Unnumbered Sparks, 2014

=== Skies Painted with Unnumbered Sparks ===
An aerial sculpture created for the TED (Technology, Entertainment, Design) conference's 30th anniversary in March 2014, suspended between the Vancouver Convention Centre and a 30-story building. For this piece, Echelman collaborated with the Google Creative Lab's Creative Director of the Data Arts team, Aaron Koblin. The sculpture spanned 745 feet. Viewers were able to connect to the lighting program and interact with the sculpture with their smartphones.

=== The Space Between Us ===
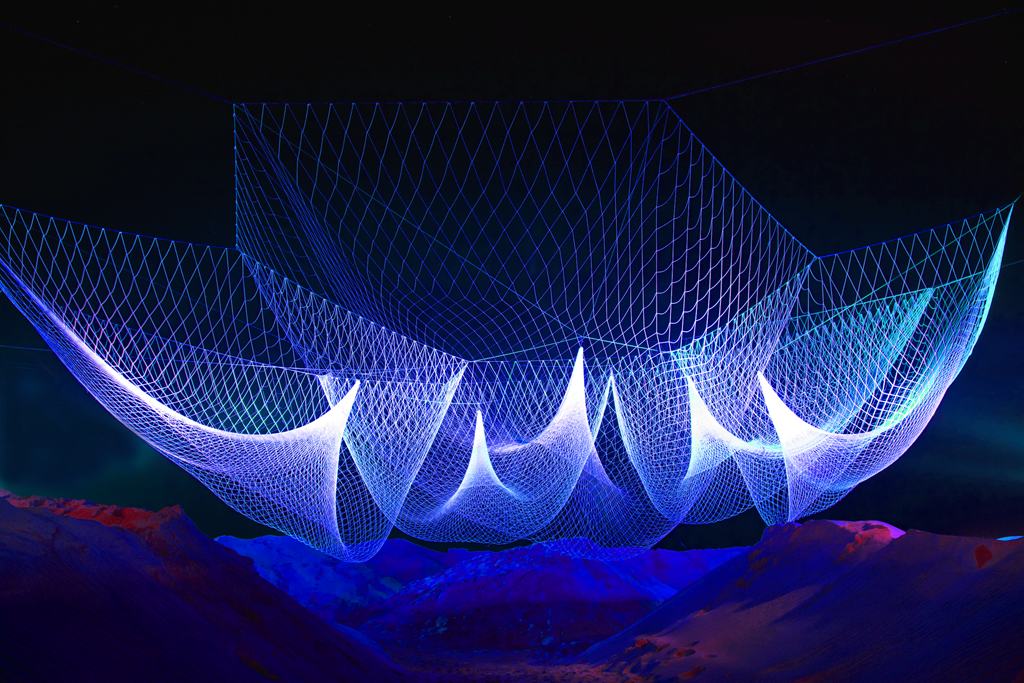
The Space Between Us, 2013

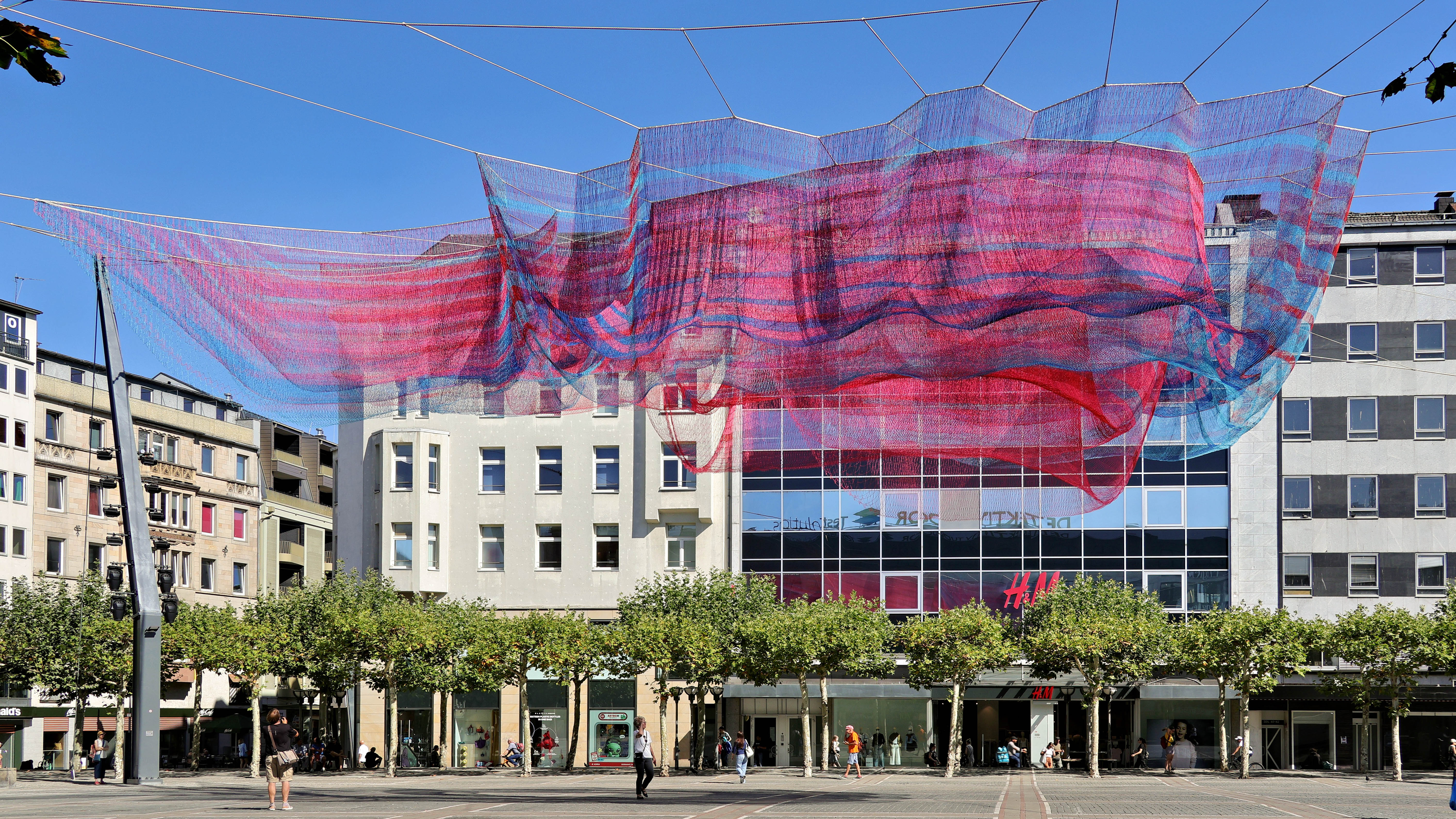
A Sky Full of Hope – Earthtime 1.78 Frankfurt (2026)

Echelman was commissioned to build one of her aerial net sculptures for a one-night light festival, GLOW, in Santa Monica on the night of September 28, 2013. The sculpture included shaped beach and an audio program to immerse visitors in the piece. More than 150,000 people attended and experienced the sculpture that night. The New York Times credited Echelman's work for "giving crafts a coolly conceptual edge."

The experience of creating this sculpture marked a point of change for Echelman. "The beach is the charged zone between human society and uncontrolled nature," she said. "I'm interested in sculpting earth and sky, and placing ourselves in between. It's the collision of heaviness and lightness, between our gravity-bound bodies which walk on sand, and the part of us which seeks to float in air, or in water."

== Personal life ==
Echelman was married to David Feldman, and they had two children together.

== Awards ==
- Public Art Network's Year in Review Award (2005, 2010, 2015, 2017)
- Tuft's University Honorary Doctorate of Fine Arts (2016)
- United States Artists Fellowship (2016)
- Smithsonian magazine's American Ingenuity Award, Visual Arts (2014)
- Architectural Digest magazine's Innovator (2012)
- John Simon Guggenheim Memorial Foundation, Fellowship in Fine Arts (2011–12)
- Harvard University Loeb Fellowship (2007–08, 2012–13)
- Fulbright Senior Lectureship in Visual Art (1997, extended 1997–98)
