= Interstate 80 =

Interstate Highway from California to New Jersey

Interstate 80
- I-80 highlighted in red

Route information
- Length: 2,900.76 mi (4,668.32 km)
- Existed: August 14, 1957–present
- History: Completed in 1986
- NHS: Entire route

Major junctions
- West end: US 101 in San Francisco, CA
- I-5 in Sacramento, CA; I-15 in Salt Lake City, UT; I-25 in Cheyenne, WY; I-29 in Council Bluffs, IA; I-35 from West Des Moines to Ankeny, IA; I-55 in Joliet, IL; I-65 in Gary, IN; I-90 / I-94 in Lake Station, IN; I-75 in Rossford, OH; I-81 in Drums, PA
- East end: I-95 in Teaneck, NJ

Location
- Country: United States
- States: California, Nevada, Utah, Wyoming, Nebraska, Iowa, Illinois, Indiana, Ohio, Pennsylvania, New Jersey

Highway system
- Interstate Highway System; Main; Auxiliary; Suffixed; Business; Future

Interstate 80 (I-80) is an east–west transcontinental freeway that crosses the United States from San Francisco, California, to Teaneck, New Jersey, in the New York metropolitan area. The highway was designated in 1956 as one of the original routes of the Interstate Highway System; its final segment was opened in 1986. At a length of 2,900.76 miles (4,668.32 km), it is the second-longest Interstate Highway in the United States, after I-90. It runs through many major cities, including Oakland, Sacramento, Reno, Salt Lake City, Cheyenne, Omaha, Des Moines, and Toledo, and passes within 10 miles (16 km) of Chicago, Cleveland, and New York City.

I-80 is the Interstate Highway that most closely approximates the route of the historic Lincoln Highway, the first trans-continental auto trail. The highway roughly traces other historically significant travel routes in the Western United States: the Oregon Trail across Wyoming and Nebraska, the California Trail across most of Nevada and California, the first transcontinental airmail route, and the route of the first transcontinental railroad, except for the vicinity of the Great Salt Lake.

From near Chicago east to near Youngstown, Ohio, I-80 is a toll road, containing most of both the Indiana Toll Road and the Ohio Turnpike. I-80 runs concurrently with I-90 from near Portage, Indiana, to Elyria, Ohio. In Pennsylvania, I-80 is known as the Keystone Shortway, a non-tolled freeway that crosses rural north-central portions of the state on the way to New Jersey and New York City.

== Route description ==
Lengths
| | mi | km |
|---|---|---|
| CA | 205.26 | 330.33 |
| NV | 410.67 | 660.91 |
| UT | 197.51 | 317.86 |
| WY | 402.76 | 648.18 |
| NE | 455.32 | 732.77 |
| IA | 303.23 | 488.00 |
| IL | 163.52 | 263.16 |
| IN | 151.56 | 243.91 |
| OH | 237.48 | 382.19 |
| PA | 311.12 | 500.70 |
| NJ | 68.35 | 110.00 |
| Total | 2,900.76 | 4,668.32 |

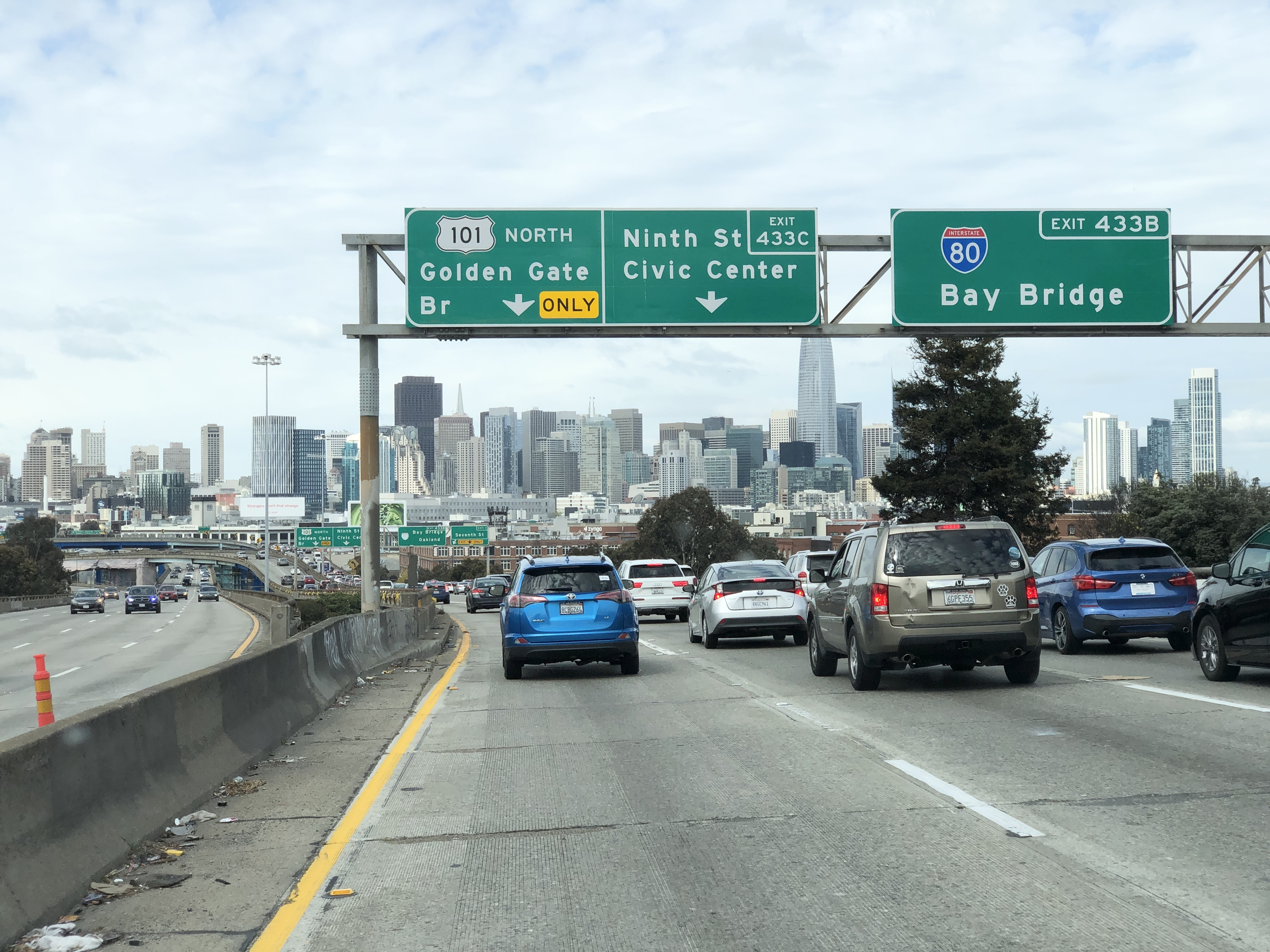
Western terminus of I-80 at US 101 in San Francisco

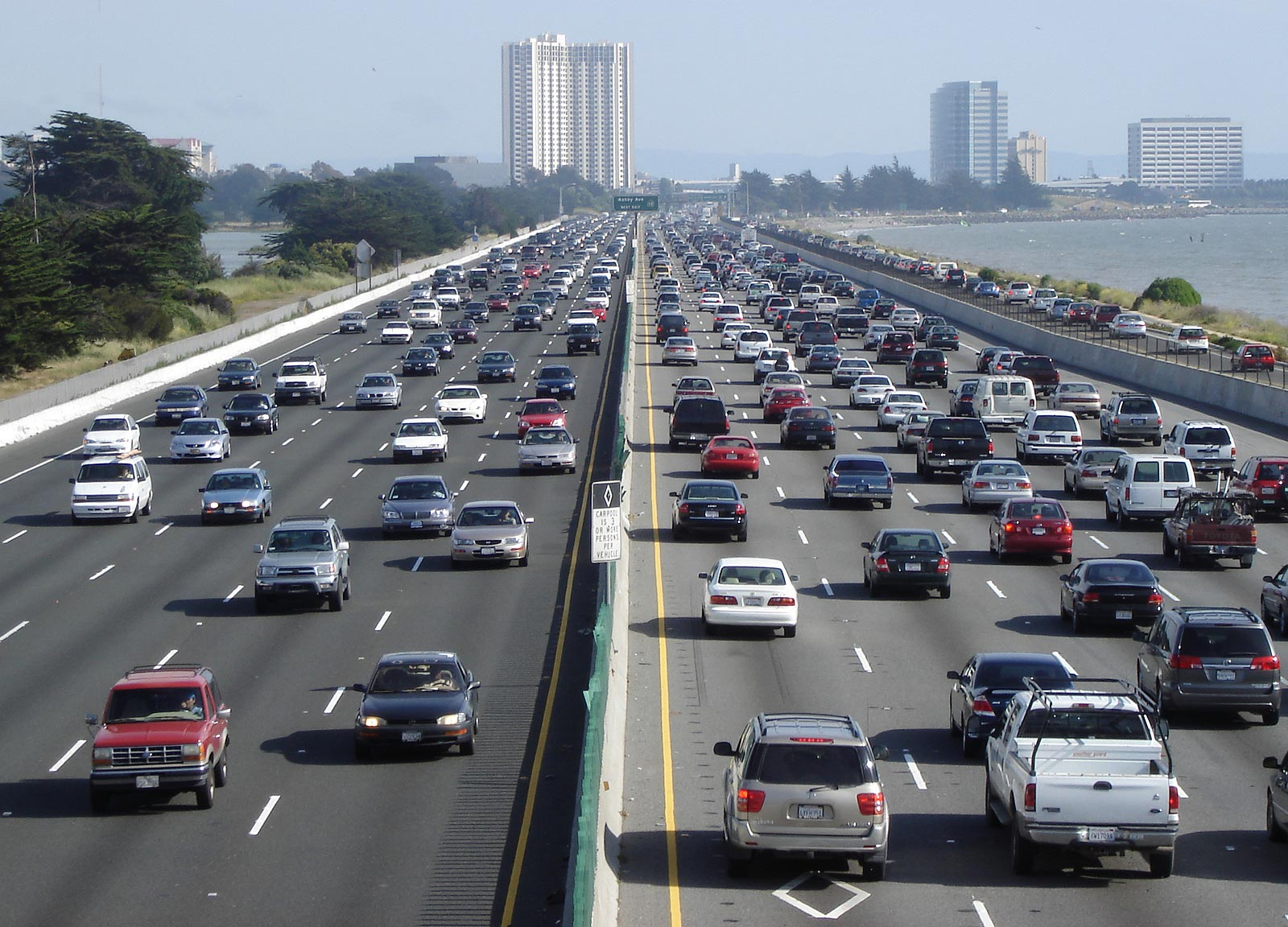
I-80 is a major urban freeway in the San Francisco Bay Area.

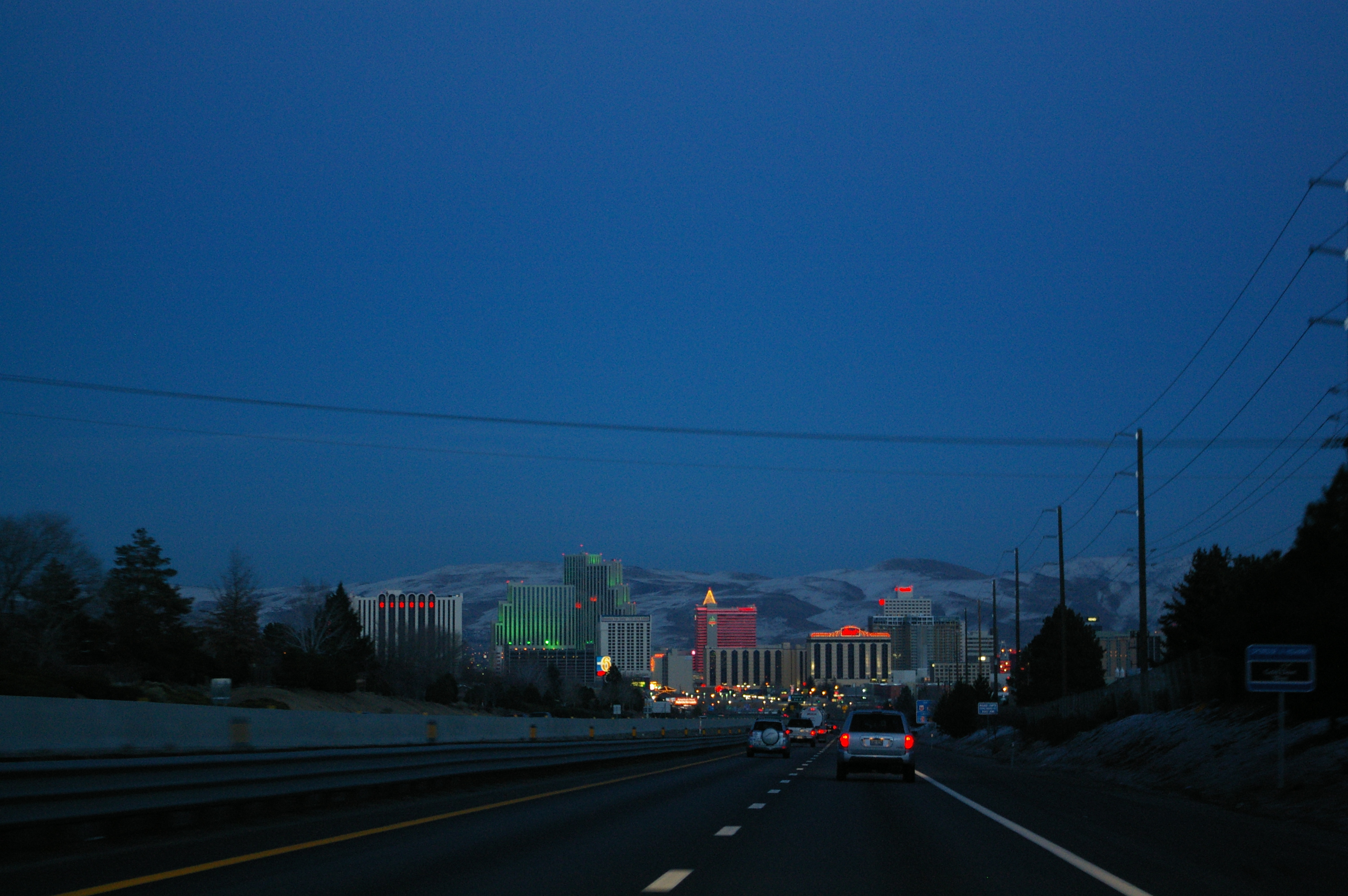
I-80 descending into Reno, Nevada, from the Sierra Nevada

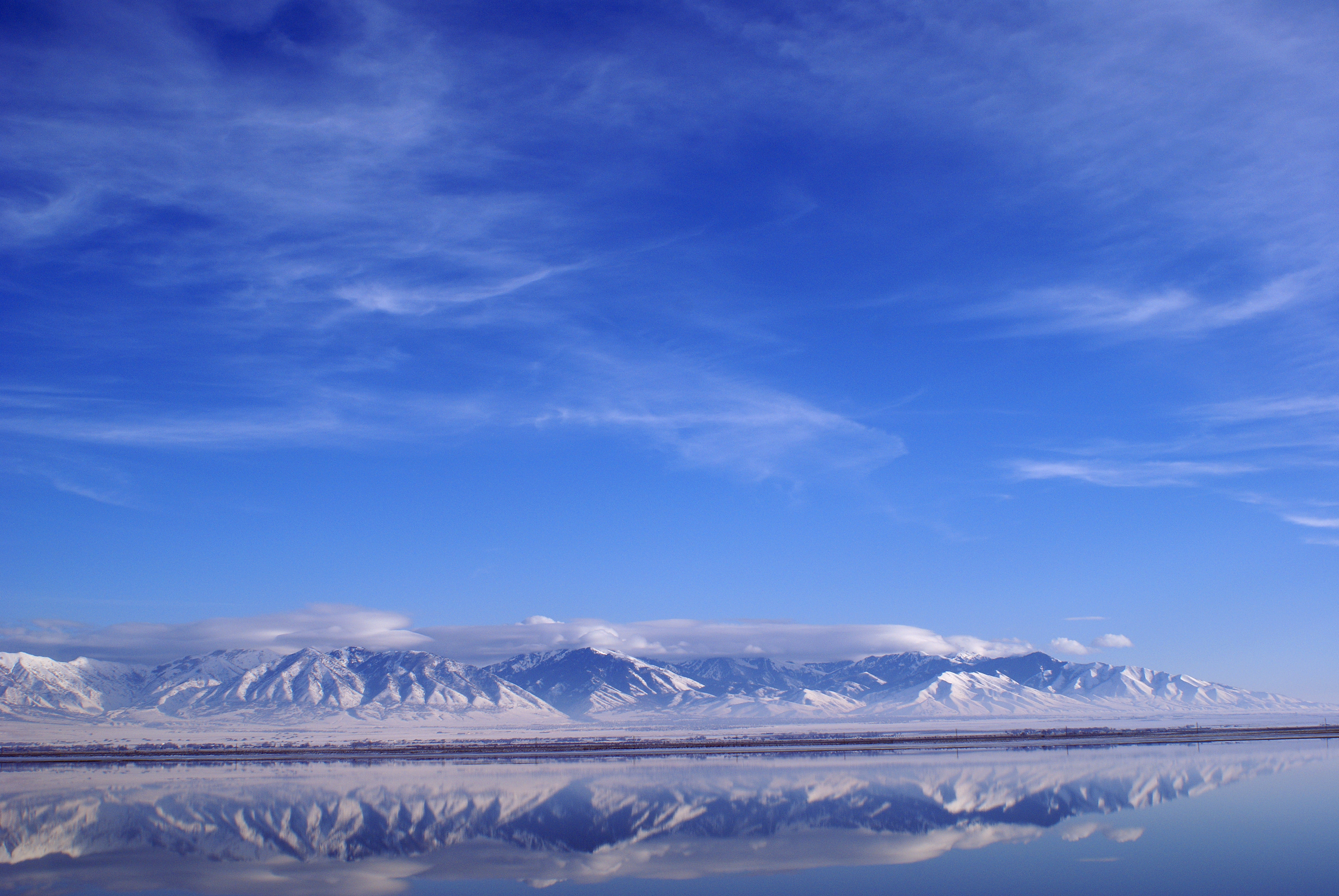
Mountains of the Great Salt Lake as seen approaching Salt Lake City from the west

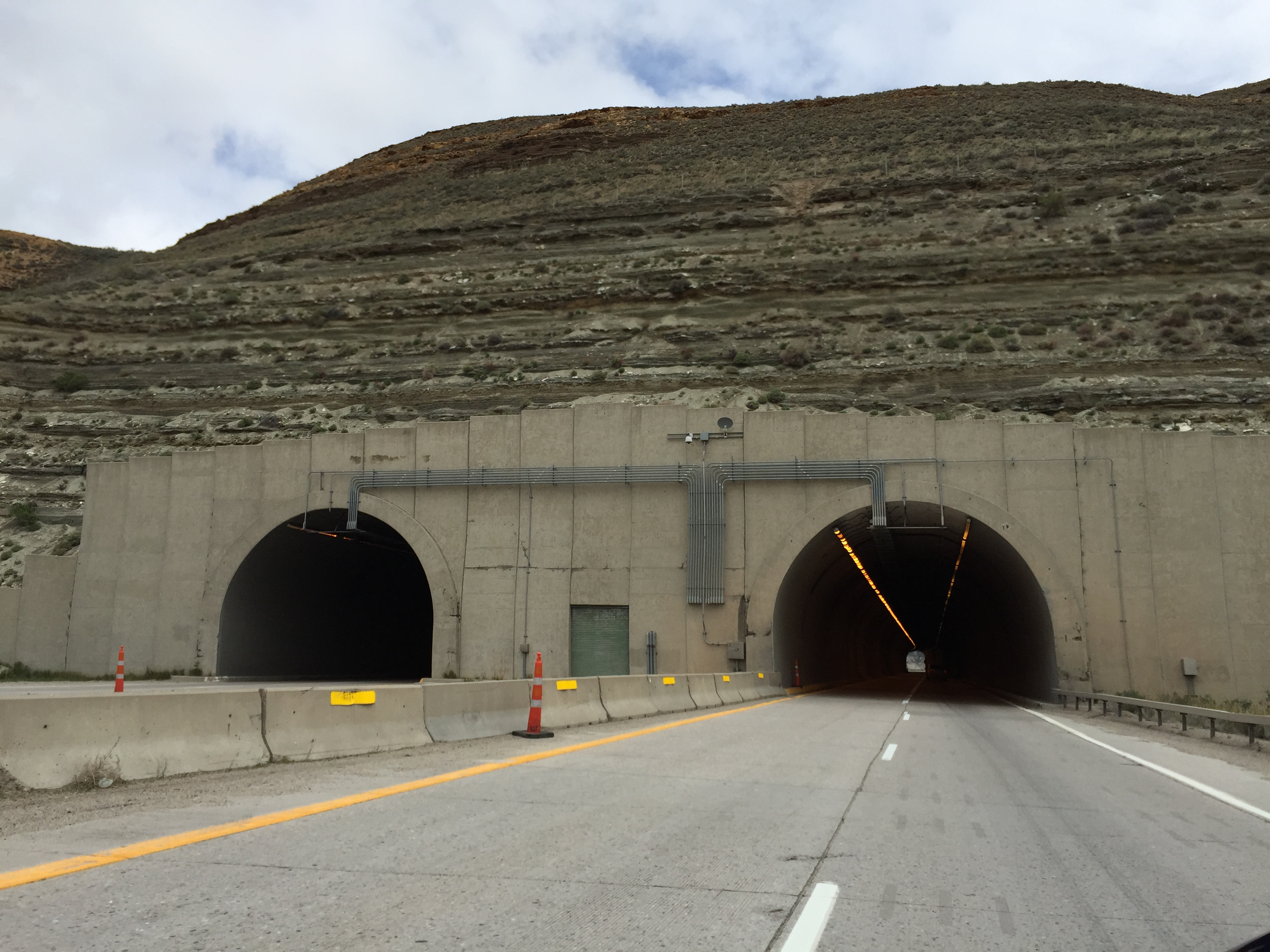
Green River Tunnel in Green River, Wyoming, one of three sets of tunnels along I-80

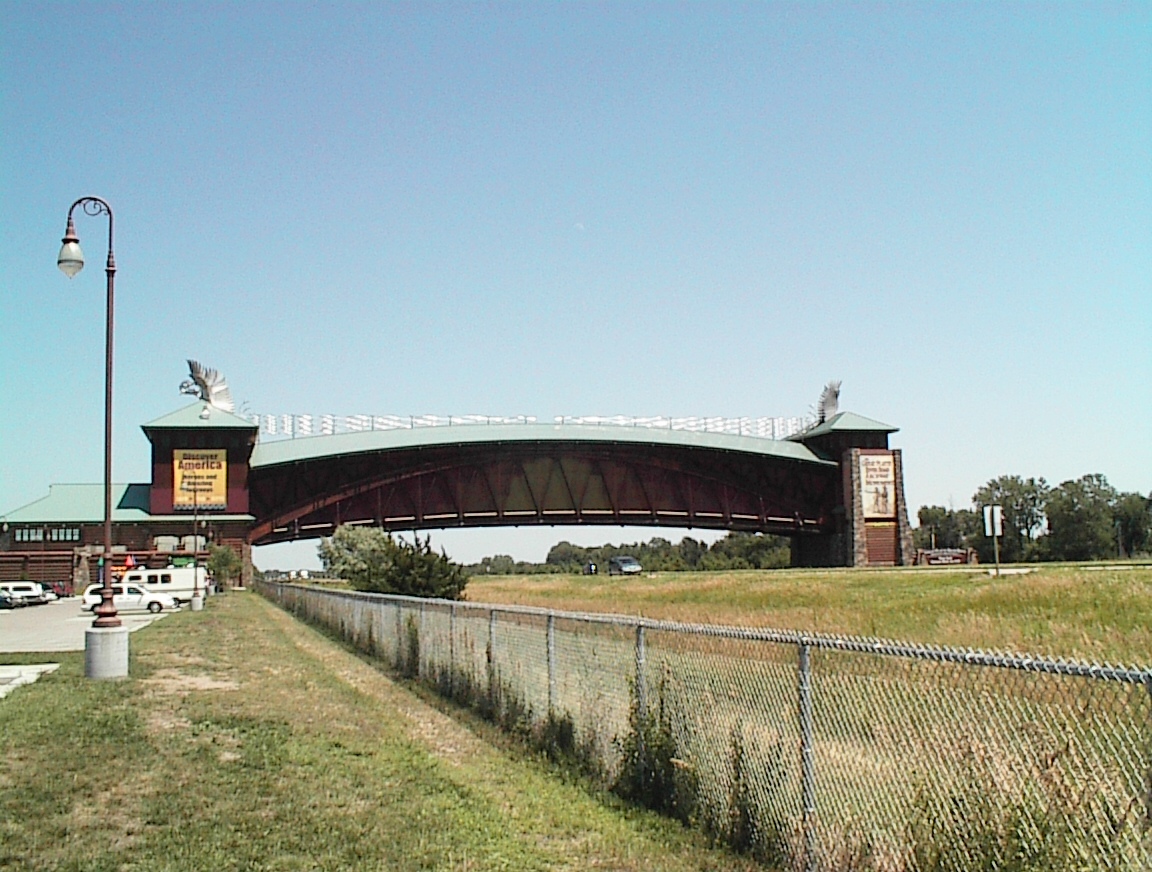
The Great Platte River Road Archway Monument in Kearney, Nebraska, which spans I-80

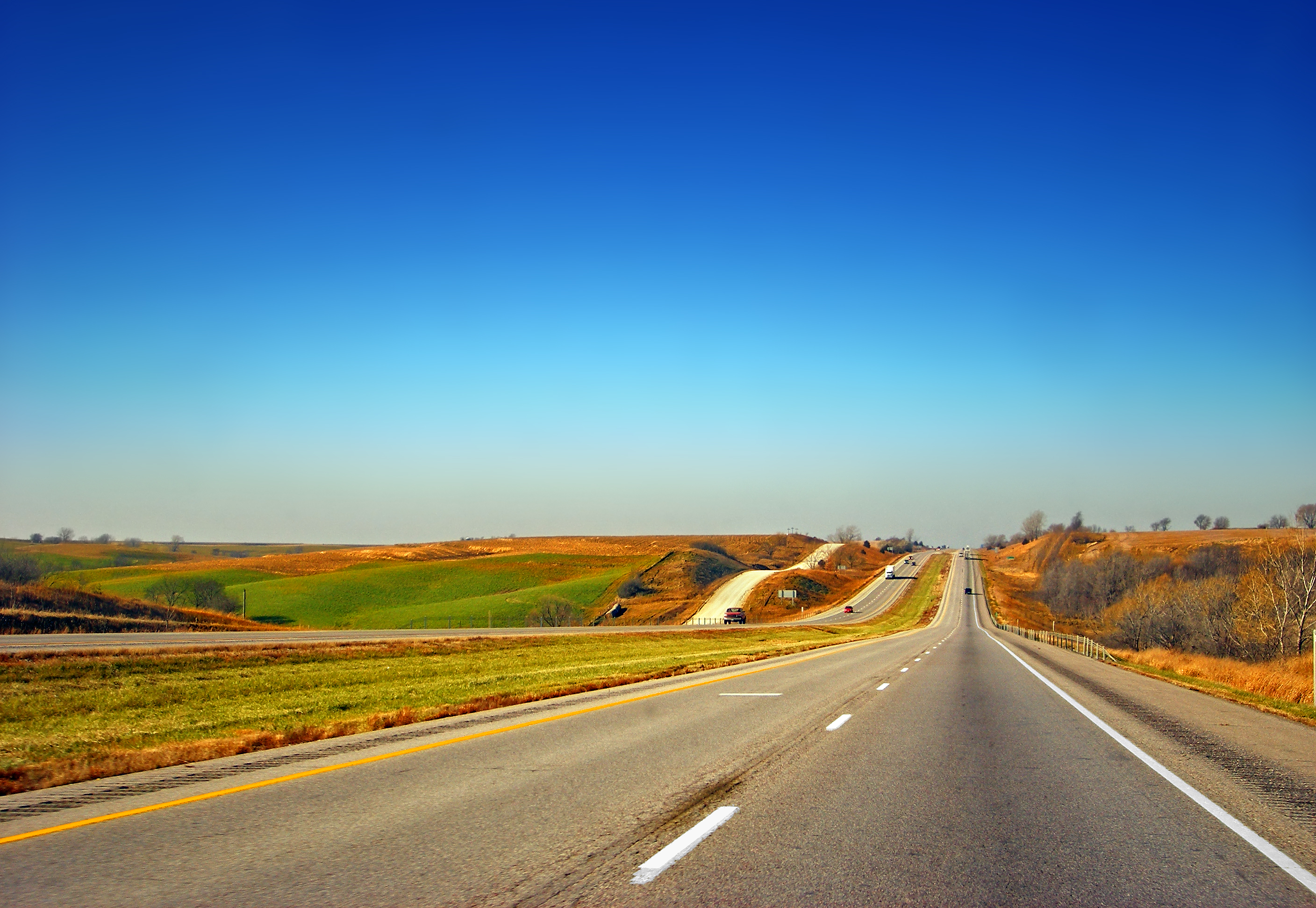
I-80 near Walnut, Iowa

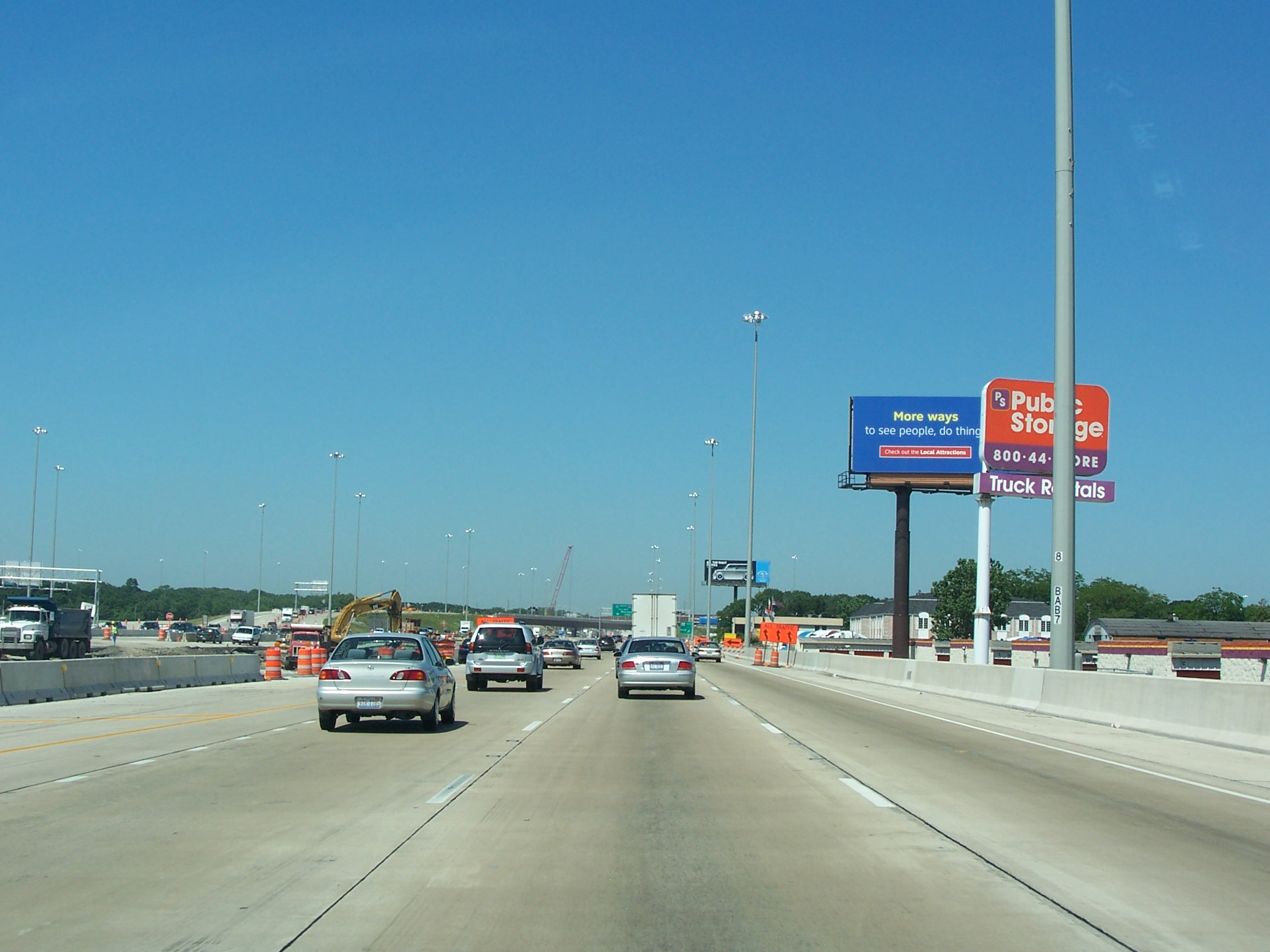
Westbound Kingery Expressway in Lansing, Illinois

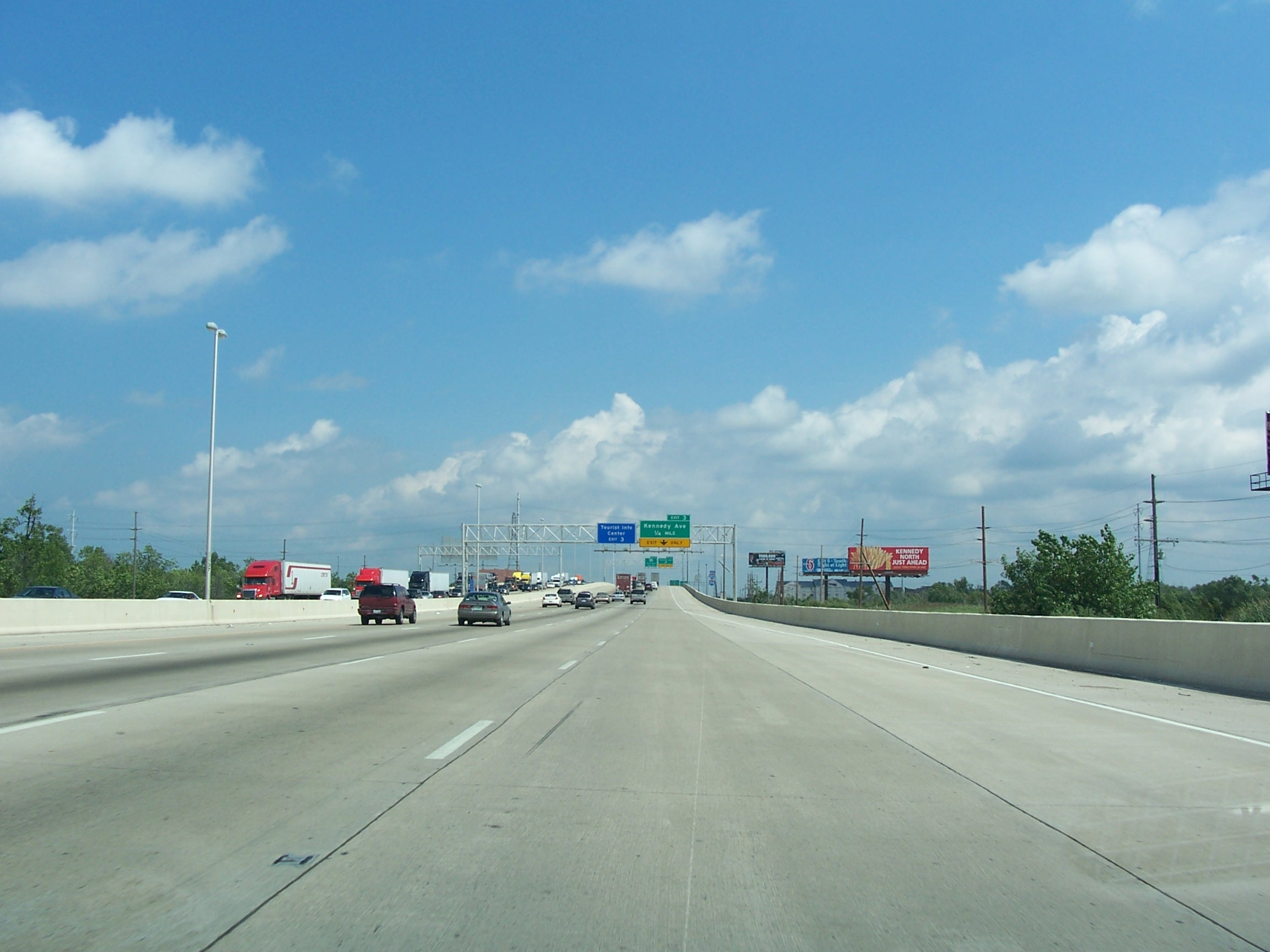
The Borman Expressway in Hammond, Indiana, approaching exit 3

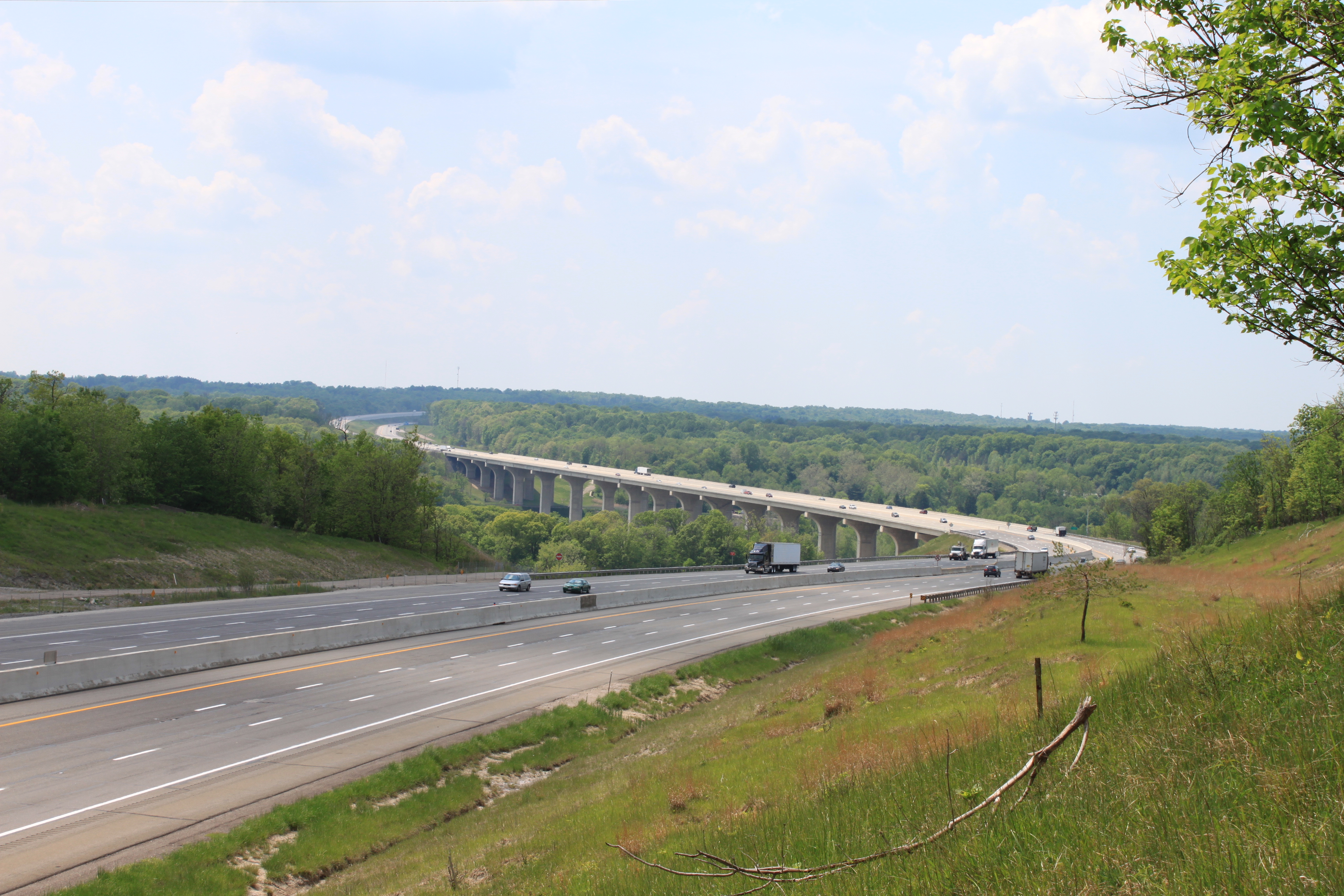
I-80 Ohio Turnpike at the Cuyahoga River

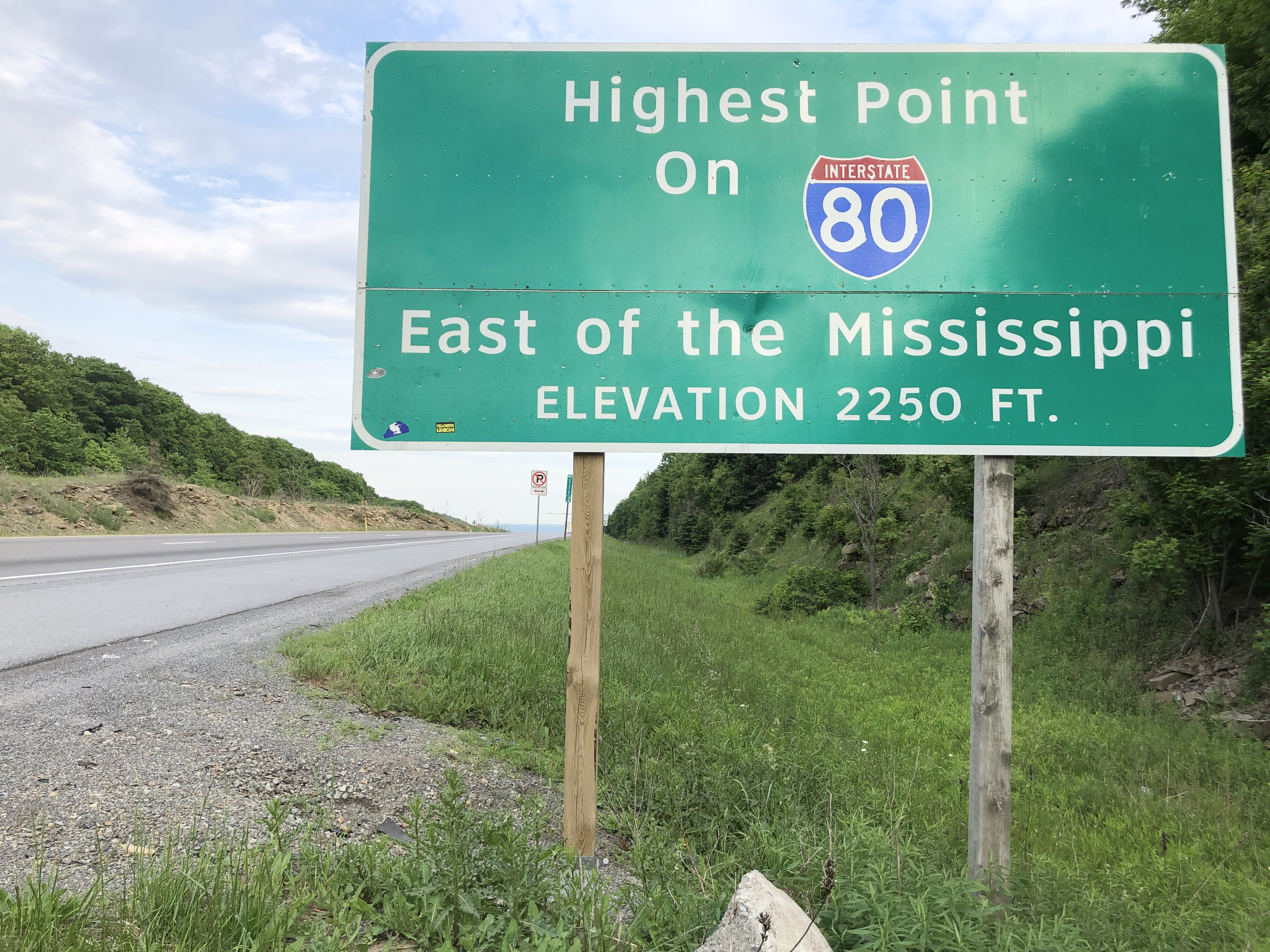
Sign noting the highest point on I-80 east of the Mississippi River located in Clearfield County, Pennsylvania

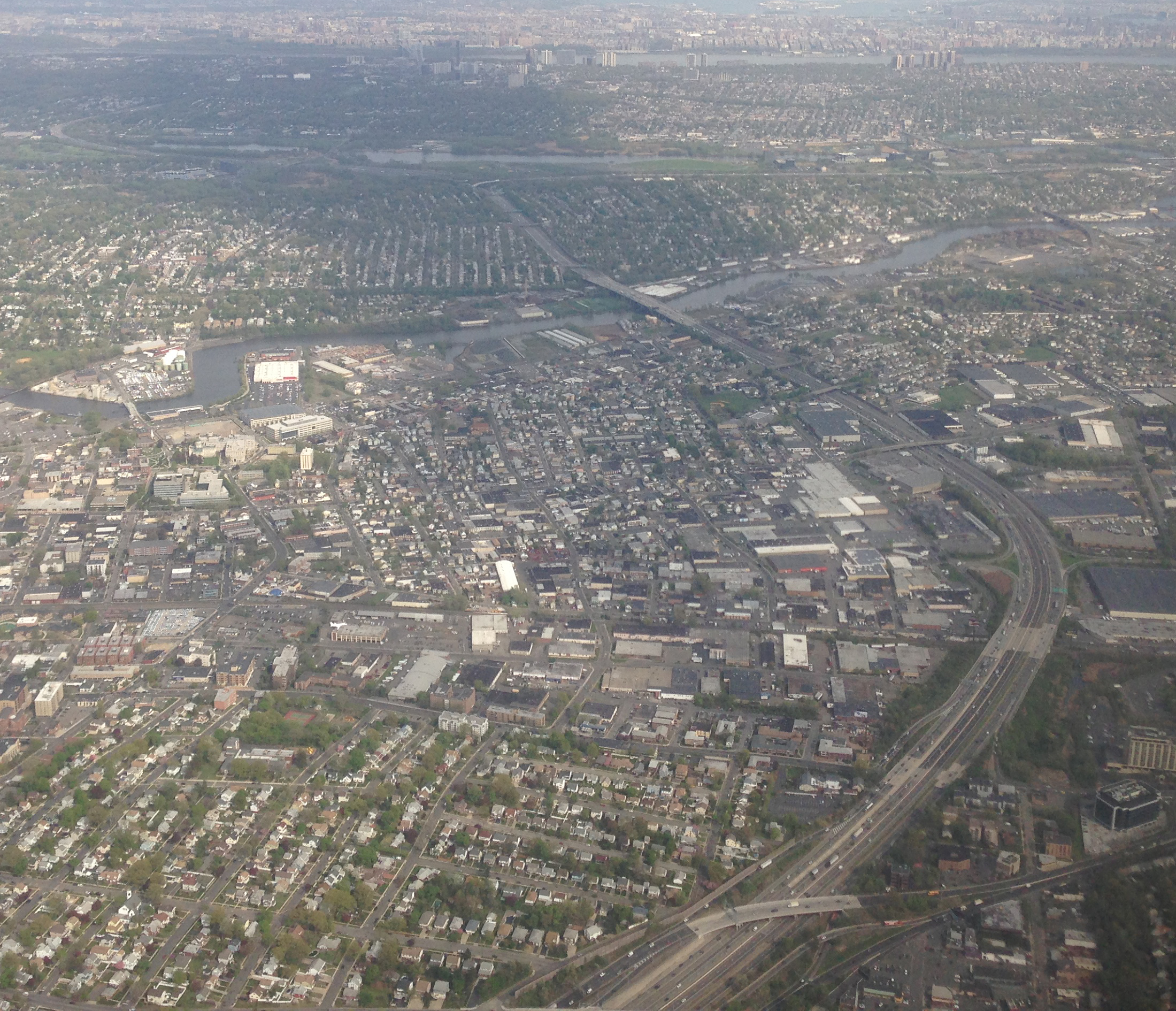
The eastern end of I-80 in Bergen County, New Jersey. Visible at the top of the photo are the George Washington Bridge and New York City.

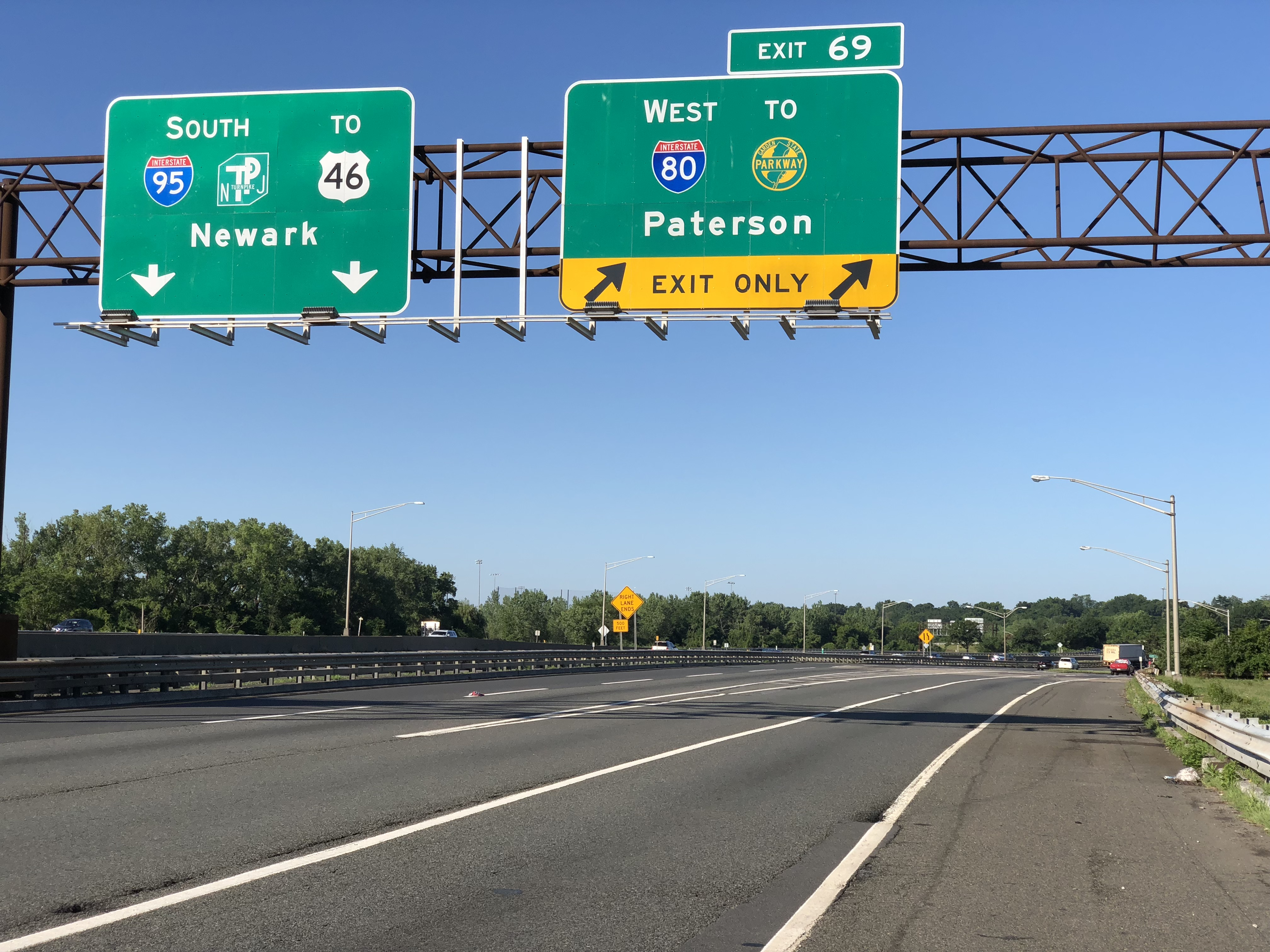
The east end of I-80 at I-95 in Teaneck, New Jersey

=== California ===
I-80 begins at an interchange with US Route 101 (US 101) in San Francisco and then crosses the San Francisco–Oakland Bay Bridge into Oakland. It then heads northeast through Vallejo, Sacramento, and the Sierra Nevada before crossing into Nevada.

A portion of the route through Pinole involved the experimental transplantation of the rare species Santa Cruz tarplant in the right-of-way.

The California section of the I-80 connects 2 of the University of California's flagship campuses, The University of California, Berkeley, and The University of California, Davis. It also maps the route (relatively) taken by the Capital Corridor Amtrak train between the cities.

=== Nevada ===
In Nevada, I-80 traverses the northern portion of the state. The freeway serves the Reno metropolitan area, and it also goes through the towns of Fernley, Lovelock, Winnemucca, Battle Mountain, Elko, Wells, and West Wendover on its way through the state.

The Nevada portion of I-80 follows the paths of the Truckee and Humboldt rivers, which have been used as a transportation corridor since the California Gold Rush of the 1840s. The Interstate also follows the historical routes of the California Trail, first transcontinental railroad, and Feather River Route throughout portions of the state. I-80 in Nevada closely follows, and at many points directly overlaps, the original route of the Victory Highway, State Route 1 (SR 1), and US 40.

=== Utah ===
After crossing Utah's western border in Wendover, I-80 crosses the desolate Bonneville Salt Flats west of the Great Salt Lake. The longest stretch between exits on an Interstate Highway is located between Wendover and Knolls, with 37.4 miles (60.2 km) between those exits. This portion of I-80, crossing the Great Salt Lake Desert, is extremely flat and straight, dotted with large warning signs about driver fatigue and drowsiness.

East of the salt flats, I-80 passes the southern edge of Great Salt Lake and continues on through Salt Lake City, where it merges with I-15 for three miles (4.8 km) before entering the Wasatch Range east of the city. It ascends Parleys Canyon and passes within a few miles of Park City as it follows a route through the mountains toward the junction with the eastern terminus of the western section of I-84. From the junction it continues up Echo Canyon and on toward the border with Wyoming, near Evanston.

The route of the Utah section of I-80 is defined in Utah Code Annotated § 72-4-113(10).

=== Wyoming ===
In Wyoming, I-80 reaches its maximum elevation of 8,640 feet (2,630 m) above sea level at Sherman Summit, near Buford, which, at 8,000 feet (2,400 m), is the highest community on I-80. Farther west in Wyoming, the Interstate passes through the dry Red Desert and over the Continental Divide. In a way, the highway crosses the Divide twice, since two ridges of the Rocky Mountains split in Wyoming, forming the endorheic Great Divide Basin, from which surface water cannot drain but can only evaporate.

=== Nebraska ===
I-80 enters Nebraska west of Bushnell. The western portion of I-80 in Nebraska runs very close to the state of Colorado, without entering the state. The intersection of I-76 and I-80 is visible from the Colorado–Nebraska state line. From its intersection with I-76 to Grand Island, I-80 lies in the valley of the South Platte River and the Platte River.

The longest straight stretch of Interstate anywhere in the Interstate Highway System is the approximately 72 miles (116 km) of I-80 occurring between exit 318 in the Grand Island area and milemarker 390 near Lincoln. Along this length, the road does not vary from an ideally straight line by more than a few yards. After Lincoln, I-80 turns northeast toward Omaha. It then crosses the Missouri River in Omaha to enter the state of Iowa. Part of I-80 in Nebraska is marked as a Blue Star Memorial Highway.

=== Iowa ===
I-80 is the longest Interstate Highway in Iowa. It extends from west to east across the central portion of the state through the population centers of Council Bluffs, Des Moines, and the Quad Cities. It enters the state at the Missouri River in Council Bluffs and heads east through the southern Iowa drift plain. In the Des Moines metropolitan area, I-80 meets up with I-35 and the two routes bypass Downtown Des Moines together while I-235 proceeds straight through the metro and rejoins both on the far side. In Ankeny, the Interstates split and I-80 continues east. On the west edge of the Iowa City metropolitan area, it intersects I-380, a segment of the Avenue of the Saints. Northwest of the Quad Cities in Walcott is Iowa 80, the world's largest truckstop. I-80 passes along the northern edge of Davenport and Bettendorf and leaves Iowa via the Fred Schwengel Memorial Bridge over the Mississippi River into Illinois. The majority of the highway runs through farmland, yet roughly a third of Iowa's population live along the I-80 corridor.

=== Illinois ===
In Illinois, I-80 runs from the Fred Schwengel Memorial Bridge across the Mississippi River south to an intersection with I-74. It then runs east across north-central Illinois just north of the Illinois River to Joliet. I-80 continues east through the southern suburbs of Chicago and joins I-94 just before entering Indiana.

=== Indiana ===
In Indiana, I-80 runs concurrently with another Interstate Highway for its entire length. It runs with I-94 on the Borman Expressway from the Illinois state line to Lake Station, Indiana, then with I-90 on the Indiana Toll Road from Lake Station to the Ohio state line.

Between La Porte and the Toledo metropolitan area, I-80/I-90 is located within 10 miles (16 km) of the Michigan state line but does not enter that state. From the State Road 9 (SR 9) and I-80/I-90 interchange, the Indiana–Michigan state line is barely 1,000 feet (300 m) to the north. I-80/I-90 passes through the South Bend–Mishawaka metropolitan area, passing the University of Notre Dame and the University Park Mall, intersecting with the St. Joseph Valley Parkway. At another point in northern Indiana, I-80/I-90 comes within about 200 yards (180 m) of the Michigan border.

=== Ohio ===
In Ohio, I-80/I-90 enters from the Indiana Toll Road and immediately becomes the Ohio Turnpike. The two Interstates cross rural northwest Ohio and run just south of the Toledo metropolitan area. In Rossford, the turnpike intersects I-75 before continuing east-southeast roughly following the curve of the southwest shore of Lake Erie toward Amherst.

In Elyria Township, just west of Cleveland, I-90 splits from I-80, leaving the turnpike and running northeast as a freeway. I-80 runs east-southeast through the southern suburbs of Cleveland. Just northwest of Youngstown, the Ohio Turnpike continues southeast as I-76, while I-80 exits the turnpike and runs east to the north of Youngstown, entering Pennsylvania south of Sharon, Pennsylvania.

=== Pennsylvania ===
In Pennsylvania, I-80 is the main east–west freeway through the central part of the state. It runs from the Ohio state line near Sharon to the Delaware Water Gap Toll Bridge over the Delaware River and is called the "Z.H. Confair Memorial Highway".

It traverses the extreme northern section of Greater Pittsburgh. I-80 serves as the western terminus for I-376 which connects it to Pittsburgh International Airport and on to Downtown Pittsburgh and suburban Pittsburgh. I-80 intersects I-79, which connects with Erie (about 75 miles (121 km) to the north) and Pittsburgh (about 55 miles (89 km) to the south). Further east, I-99 connects with State College and Altoona. A spur from I-80 (I-180) runs to Williamsport. Upon entering the Pocono Mountains region, I-80 meets I-81, connecting Syracuse, New York, and Harrisburg, and I-476 which connects with Scranton, Wilkes-Barre, Allentown, and Philadelphia. Another spur (I-380) runs to Scranton.

In Clearfield County, I-80 reaches its highest elevation east of the Mississippi River, 2,250 feet (690 m), although other Interstate Highways east of the Mississippi, including I-26 in North Carolina and Tennessee, reach higher elevations.

In 2007, the Pennsylvania Turnpike Commission (PTC), combined with state legislature Act No. 44, initiated plans to enact a tolling system on the entire span of I-80 throughout the commonwealth of Pennsylvania. On October 15, 2007, the Pennsylvania Department of Transportation (PennDOT) and the PTC signed a 50-year lease agreement, which would allow the PTC to maintain and, eventually, toll I-80. However, the application for a toll was rejected by the Federal Highway Administration (FHWA).

=== New Jersey ===
I-80 does not enter New York City. Once the I-95/New Jersey Turnpike was extended in 1971 from its former terminus at US 46 in Ridgefield to I-80 in Teaneck, the section from Teaneck to Fort Lee was resigned as I-95, and it is the latter roadway that enters New York City via the George Washington Bridge. I-80's designated end (as per signage and New Jersey Department of Transportation (NJDOT) documents) is four miles (6.4 km) short of New York City in Teaneck, before the Degraw Avenue overpass. There, signs designate the end of I-80 and the beginning of I-95/New Jersey Turnpike northbound.

One section of I-80 running from Netcong to Denville was constructed in 1958.

== History ==
I-80 was included in the original plan for the Interstate Highway System as approved in 1956. The highway was built in segments, with the final piece of I-80 completed in 1986 on the western edge of Salt Lake City. This piece was coincidentally dedicated close to the 30th birthday of the Interstate Highway System, which was noted at the dedication and considered to be a milestone in the history of highway construction in the United States. It was also noted at the dedication that this was only 50 miles (80 km) south of Promontory Summit, where another first in a transcontinental artery was completed—the golden spike of the US's first transcontinental railroad.

=== Geological study ===
John McPhee described the geology revealed by the building of I-80 in a series of books on the formation of the continent of North America, books that were published between 1981 and 1993 and collected in a one-volume edition in 1998 Annals of the Former World which won a Pulitzer Prize in 1999. In "Basin and Range" (1981), he described how the idea emerged in a conversation with Princeton geologist Kenneth S. Deffeyes:

What about Interstate 80, I asked him. It goes the distance. How would it be? "Absorbing," he said. And he mused aloud: After 80 crosses the Border Fault, it pussyfoots along on morainal till that levelled up the fingers of the foldbelt hills. It does a similar dance with glacial debris in parts of Pennsylvania. It needs no assistance on the craton. It climbs a ramp to the Rockies and a fault-block staircase up the front of the Sierra. It is geologically shrewd. It was the route of animal migrations, and of human history that followed. It avoids melodrama, avoids the Grand Canyons, the Jackson Holes, the geologic operas of the country, but it would surely be a sound experience of the big picture, of the history, the construction, the components of the continent.

== Junction list ==
California
US 101 in San Francisco
I-880 in Oakland
I-580 on the Oakland–Emeryville city line. The highways travel concurrently to Albany.
I-780 in Vallejo
I-680 in Fairfield
I-505 in Vacaville
I-80 BL / I-305 / US 50 in West Sacramento
I-5 in Sacramento
Nevada
I-580 / US 395 in Reno
US 95 south-southwest of Lovelock. The highways travel concurrently to Winnemucca.
US 93 in Wells
Utah
I-215 in Salt Lake City
I-15 in Salt Lake City. The highways travel concurrently to South Salt Lake.
US 89 in South Salt Lake
I-215 southeast of Salt Lake City
US 40 / US 189 in Silver Creek Junction. I-80/US 189 travels concurrently to east-northeast of Evanston, Wyoming.
I-84 in Echo
Wyoming
US 30 in Little America. The highways travel concurrently to south-southeast of Walcott.
US 191 in Purple Sage. The highways travel concurrently to Rock Springs.
US 287 east of Rawlins. The highways travel concurrently to south-southeast of Walcott.
US 30 / US 287 in Laramie. I-80 / US 30 travel concurrently to southwest of Cheyenne.
I-25 / US 87 southwest of Cheyenne
I-180 / US 85 on the Fox Farm–Cheyenne line
US 30 east-northeast of Cheyenne. The highways travel concurrently to Pine Bluffs.
Nebraska
US 138 southwest of Big Springs
I-76 southwest of Big Springs
US 26 in Ogallala
US 83 in North Platte
US 283 south of Lexington
US 183 south of Elm Creek
US 34 / US 281 south of Grand Island
US 81 in York
US 6 in Lincoln
US 77 in Lincoln. The highways travel concurrently to north-northeast of Lincoln.
I-180 / US 34 in Lincoln
US 6 in Waverly
US 275 in Omaha
I-680 in Omaha
I-480 / US 75 in Omaha
Iowa
I-29 in Council Bluffs. The highways travel concurrently through Council Bluffs.
US 6 in Council Bluffs
I-880 northwest of Minden
US 59 in Avoca
US 6 / US 71 north-northeast of Lorah. I-80/US 6 travel concurrently to De Soto.
US 6 / US 169 in De Soto
I-35 / I-235 in West Des Moines. I-35/I-80 travels concurrently to Ankeny.
US 6 on the Clive–Urbandale city line
US 69 in Des Moines
I-35 / I-235 in Ankeny
US 65 in Altoona. The highways travel concurrently through Altoona.
US 6 / US 65 in Altoona. I-80/US 6 travels concurrently to Newton.
US 63 south of Malcom
US 151 east-northeast of Williamsburg
I-380 / US 218 on the Tiffin–Coralville city line
US 6 north-northwest of Wilton. The highways travel concurrently to Davenport.
I-280 / US 6 / US 61 in Davenport. I-80/US 61 travels concurrently through Davenport.
I-74 in Davenport
US 67 in Le Claire
Illinois
I-88 in East Moline
US 6 in Colona
I-74 / I-280 in Colona
I-180 northeast of Princeton
I-39 / US 51 in LaSalle
I-55 in Channahon
US 52 in Joliet
US 30 in New Lenox
I-355 in New Lenox
US 45 on the Mokena–Orland Park–Tinley Park city line
I-57 in Country Club Hills
I-294 in Hazel Crest. The highways travel concurrently to the South Holland–Lansing village line.
I-94 / I-294 on the South Holland–Lansing village line. I-80/I-94 travels concurrently to Lake Station, Indiana.
US 6 in Lansing. The highways travel concurrently to Lake Station, Indiana.
Indiana
US 41 in Hammond. The highways travel concurrently through Hammond.
I-65 in Gary
I-90 / I-94 in Lake Station. I-80/I-90 travels concurrently to northwest of Elyria, Ohio.
US 421 southeast of Otis
US 31 in South Bend
US 131 north-northeast of Middlebury
I-69 west-northwest of Fremont
Ohio
US 20 in Maumee
I-75 in Perrysburg
I-280 northeast of Stony Ridge
US 250 north-northwest of Milan
I-480 in North Ridgeville
I-71 / US 42 in Strongsville
I-77 on the Richfield–Brecksville line
I-480 in Streetsboro
I-76 east-southeast of North Jackson
I-680 in Mineral Ridge
US 422 in Girard
US 62 north of Hubbard
Pennsylvania
I-376 south of Hermitage
US 19 south of Mercer
I-79 northwest of Grove City
US 322 west of Corsica
US 219 east-northeast of Falls Creek
I-99 / US 220 northwest of Zion. I-80/US 220 travels concurrently to east of Mackeyville.
US 15 north of New Columbia
I-180 northeast of New Columbia
US 11 in Lime Ridge
I-81 north-northwest of Drums
I-476 east of East Side
I-380 south-southwest of Pocono Summit
US 209 in Arlington Heights. The highways travel concurrently to east of East Stroudsburg.
New Jersey
US 46 in Columbia
US 206 west of Stanhope. The highways travel concurrently to south-southeast of Netcong.
US 46 in Netcong
US 46 east of Rockaway
US 202 in Parsippany-Troy Hills
I-287 in Parsippany-Troy Hills
I-280 in Parsippany-Troy Hills
US 46 in Parsippany-Troy Hills
US 46 in Wayne
I-95 in Teaneck
