= Hagan Stone Park =

Park in North Carolina, United States

Coordinates: 35.953838°N 79.7329769°W

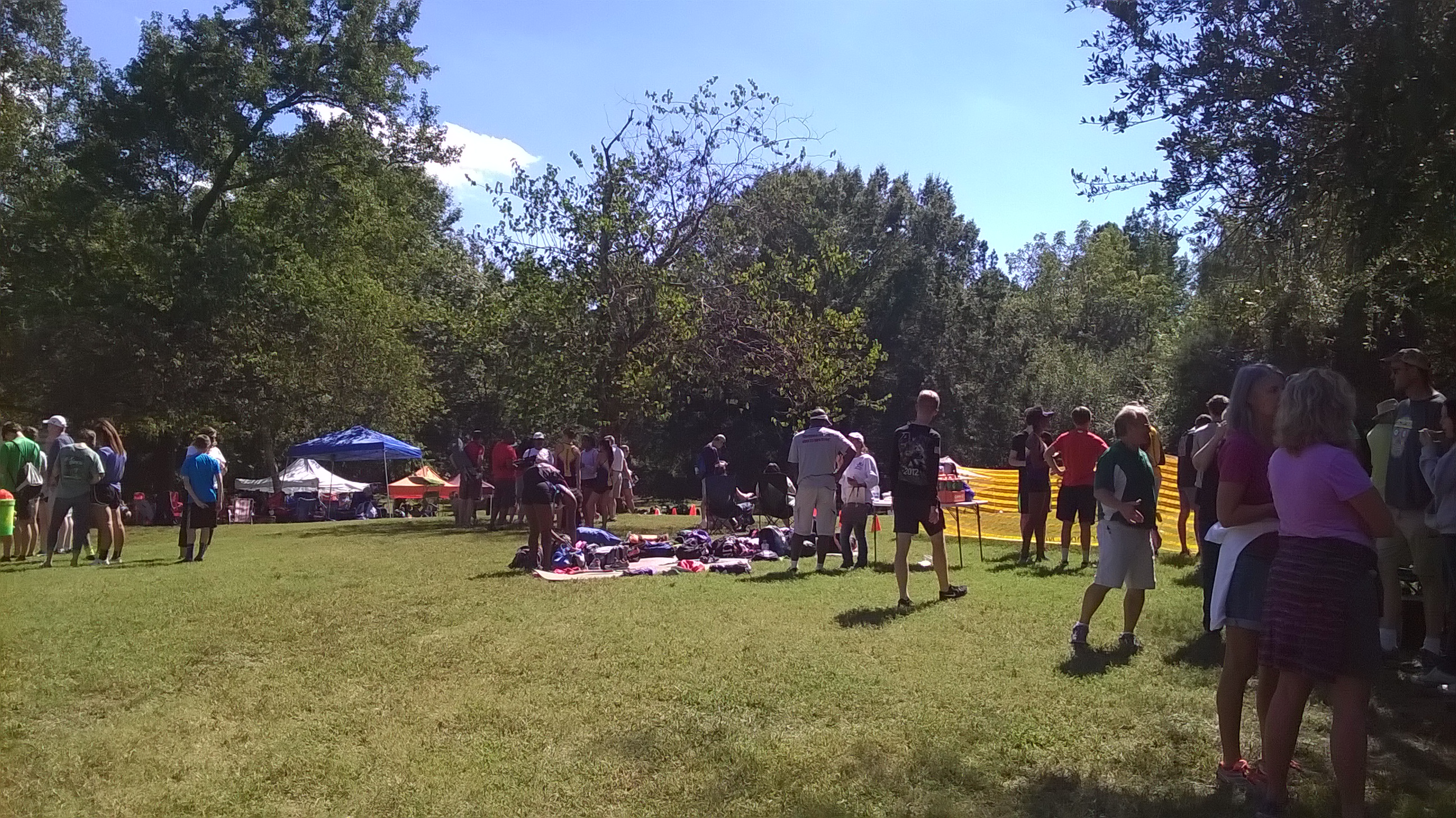
Hagan Stone Park during the 2016 Greensboro Invitational Cross Country Meet

Hagan-Stone Park is a 409-acre (1.66 km^{2}) wildlife refuge and family campground owned and operated by Guilford County, North Carolina located on Hagan Stone Park Road off U.S. Highway 421. It is open daily 8 am to sunset, weather permitting.

The park has several lakes, camp shelters with charcoal grills, and playgrounds. The park is the home of the Greensboro Invitational Cross Country Meet hosted annually in September by the Greensboro Pacesetters for high school and college athletes.
