= U.S. Route 421 =

Highway in the United States

U.S. Route 421
- US 421 highlighted in red

Route information
- Auxiliary route of US 21
- Length: 941 mi (1,514 km)
- Existed: 1930–present

Major junctions
- South end: NC 211 / Fort Fisher-Southport Ferry at Fort Fisher, NC
- I-95 in Dunn, NC; I-85 in Greensboro, NC; I-40 in Greensboro and Winston-Salem, NC; I-77 near Yadkinville, NC; I-81 near Bristol, VA; I-75 near Lexington, KY; I-69 / I-74 / I-465 in Indianapolis, IN; I-70 in Indianapolis, IN; I-80 / I-90 near Otis, IN; I-94 near Michigan City, IN
- North end: US 20 at Michigan City, IN

Location
- Country: United States
- States: North Carolina, Tennessee, Virginia, Kentucky, Indiana

Highway system
- United States Numbered Highway System; List; Special; Divided

U.S. Route 421 (also U.S. Highway 421, US 421) is a diagonal northwest–southeast United States Numbered Highway in the states of North Carolina, Tennessee, Virginia, Kentucky, and Indiana. The highway runs for 941 miles (1,514 km) from Fort Fisher, North Carolina, to US 20 in Michigan City, Indiana. Along its routing, US 421 serves several cities including Wilmington, North Carolina; Greensboro, North Carolina; Bristol, Tennessee and Virginia; Lexington, Kentucky; and Indianapolis, Indiana. US 421 is a spur route of US 21, which it meets west of Yadkinville, North Carolina.

== Route description ==
Lengths
	mi	km
NC	328	528
TN	43.4	69.8
VA	69.23	111.41
KY	272.4	438.4
IN	232.00	373.37
Total	941	1,514

US 421 begins at Fort Fisher, North Carolina, and heads generally to the northwest to Michigan City, Indiana. Along the way, it passes through Bristol, Tennessee and Virginia; Lexington, Kentucky; and Indianapolis, Indiana.

=== North Carolina ===
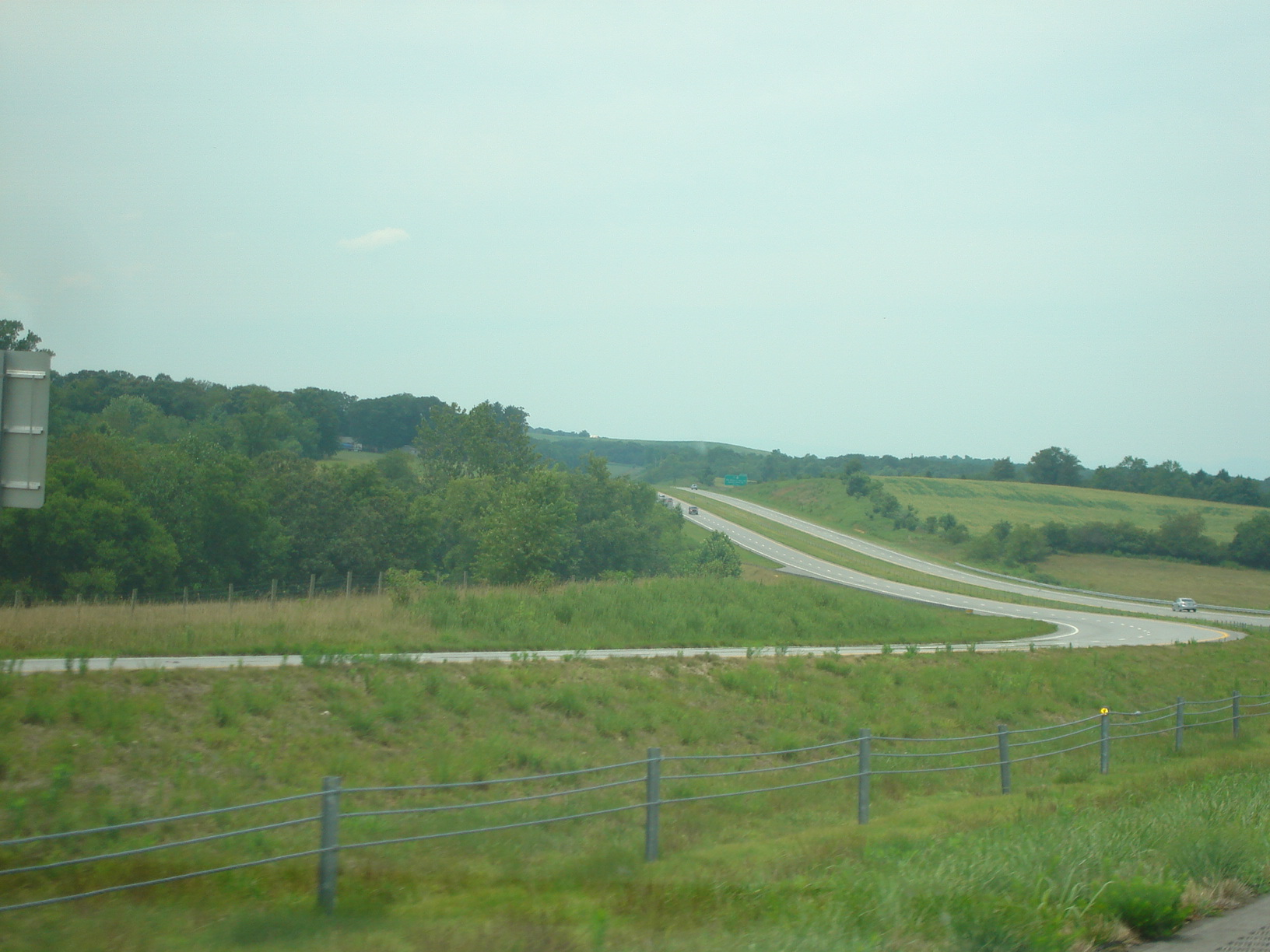
US 421 south near the Red White and Blue Road (exit 276) in eastern Wilkes County, July 2007

US 421 begins near Fort Fisher State Recreation Area and heads through North Carolina's southeastern beaches to Wilmington. It then heads in a northwesterly direction through Clinton, Dunn, Lillington, Sanford and Siler City to the Piedmont Triad region. Major highway junctions between north of Wilmington and Greensboro are North Carolina Highway 11 (NC 11), Interstate 95 (I-95), US 401, US 1, US 64 and I-85. In Greensboro, it follows the Greensboro Urban Loop paired with I-85 south of Greensboro, close to Pleasant Garden, and I-73 northwest of Greensboro, close to Colfax. It then departs the urban loop and connects to I-40 towards Forsyth County as it becomes its own freeway along the former Business Loop 40 alignment. Major intersections are NC 150, NC 66, NC 67, US 158 and US 52 between Greensboro and Winston-Salem. After Winston-Salem, it intersects I-40 once again but continues westerly passing through Lewisville, Yadkinville, Wilkesboro and Boone. Major highway junctions between Winston-Salem and Boone are US 601, I-77, NC 16, Blue Ridge Parkway, US 221 and US 321. US 421 continues westerly into Tennessee towards Mountain City, Tennessee. US 421 is a limited-access freeway through Siler City northward. US 421 is a divided highway from north of NC 49 all of the way to Wilkesboro.

=== Tennessee ===
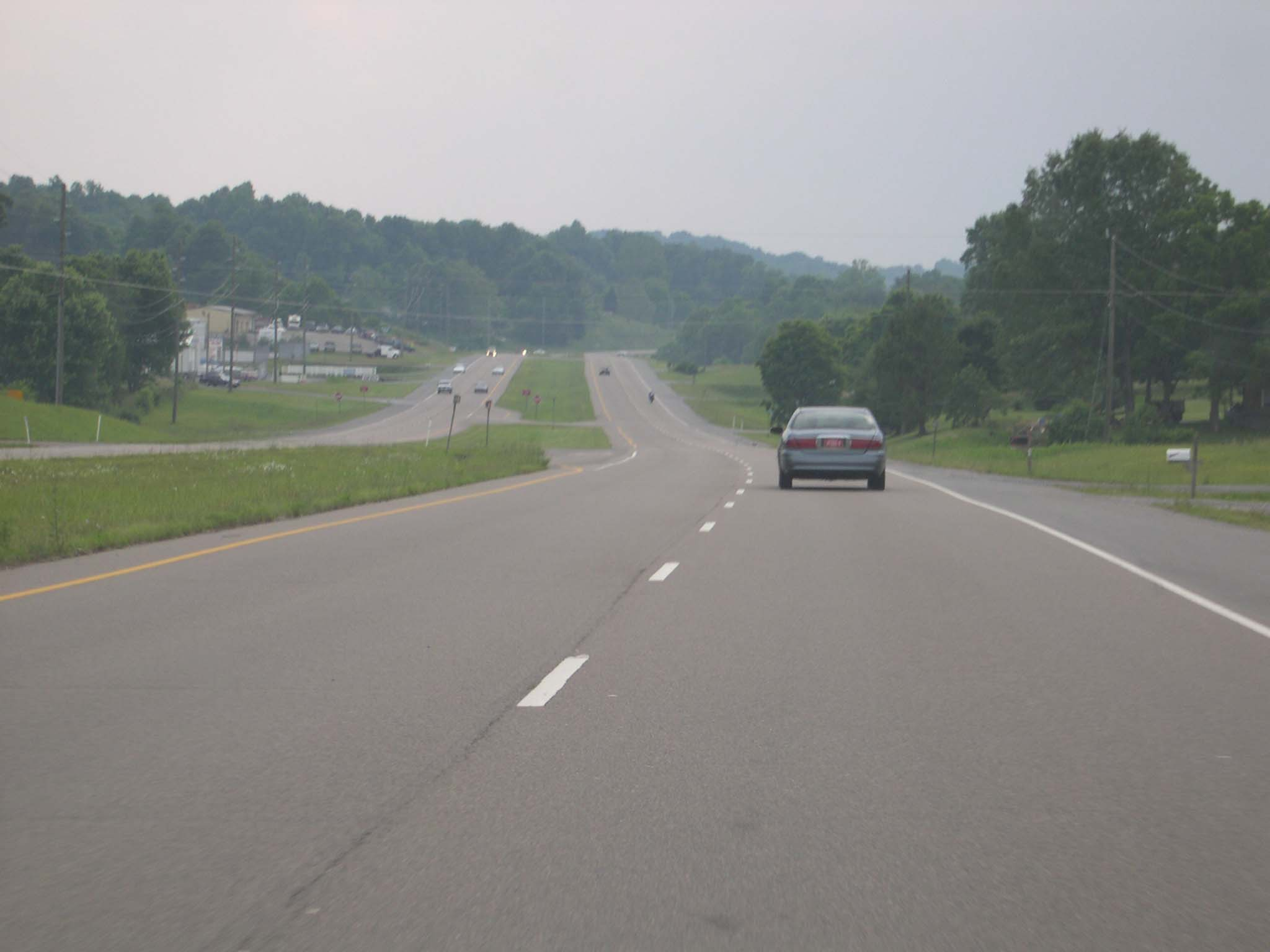
US 421 near Bristol in June 2006

US 421 enters Tennessee from North Carolina at Trade. It is the oldest crossroads community in Tennessee and is the easternmost part of the state. The road "as the crow would fly" is a short distance in Volunteer State but traverses through two mountain ranges. After Trade, it ventures into Mountain City through a 40 mph (64 km/h) zone while bypassing the downtown area. After Mountain City, begins the two mountain ranges and in between them is the area of Shady Valley. The two ranges are a popular motorcycle route known as "The Snake". More than 400 curves over an approximately 30-mile (48 km) ride. After the second mountain range, it flattens out after the South Fork Holston River heading towards Bristol. US 421 enters Virginia on the Old Dominion side of Bristol. Major highway junctions between the NC and VA state lines are State Route 67 (SR 67) in Mountain City, SR 91 the new Mountain City bypass, SR-394, and US 11E.

=== Virginia ===
US 421 enters from Tennessee in Bristol and goes west to Weber City, Duffield, and Pennington Gap in Southwest Virginia. The route goes through the Cumberland and Powell Mountains, and goes by Natural Tunnel State Park near Duffield.

=== Kentucky ===
US 421 enters the Bluegrass State running 272.4 miles (438.4 km) from the Pennington Gap area in Virginia into Harlan County.

For the distance between the Virginia state line and closer to Hal Rogers Parkway, it is a major north–south two-lane highway. However, its passing zones are largely limited to a stretch after the Virginia line, through Harlan and along US 119. US 421 then crosses Pine Mountain and enters Leslie County, turning west at Hyden and paralleling the Hal Rogers Parkway. Between Manchester and McKee, US 421 functions as more of a local road with many curves.

The roadway improves as it descends from the Cumberland Plateau into the Bluegrass Region at Big Hill in Madison County near Berea. It joins US 25 at the Blue Grass Army Depot south of Richmond and roughly parallels I-75 towards Lexington. Through Lexington, it is Richmond Road, Main Street and Leestown Road. The segment between Lexington and Frankfort was once designated Kentucky Route 50 (KY 50). US 62 runs briefly with US 421 in this section.

In Frankfort, US 421 runs with US 60 on the west side of town, then runs within the city's northern bypass, briefly joining US 127. US 421 then traverses the very hilly area of northwest Franklin County, around the Flag Fork community. It then runs through Henry and Trimble counties, exiting the state at Milton, crossing the Ohio River into Madison, Indiana via the Milton–Madison Bridge.

=== Indiana ===
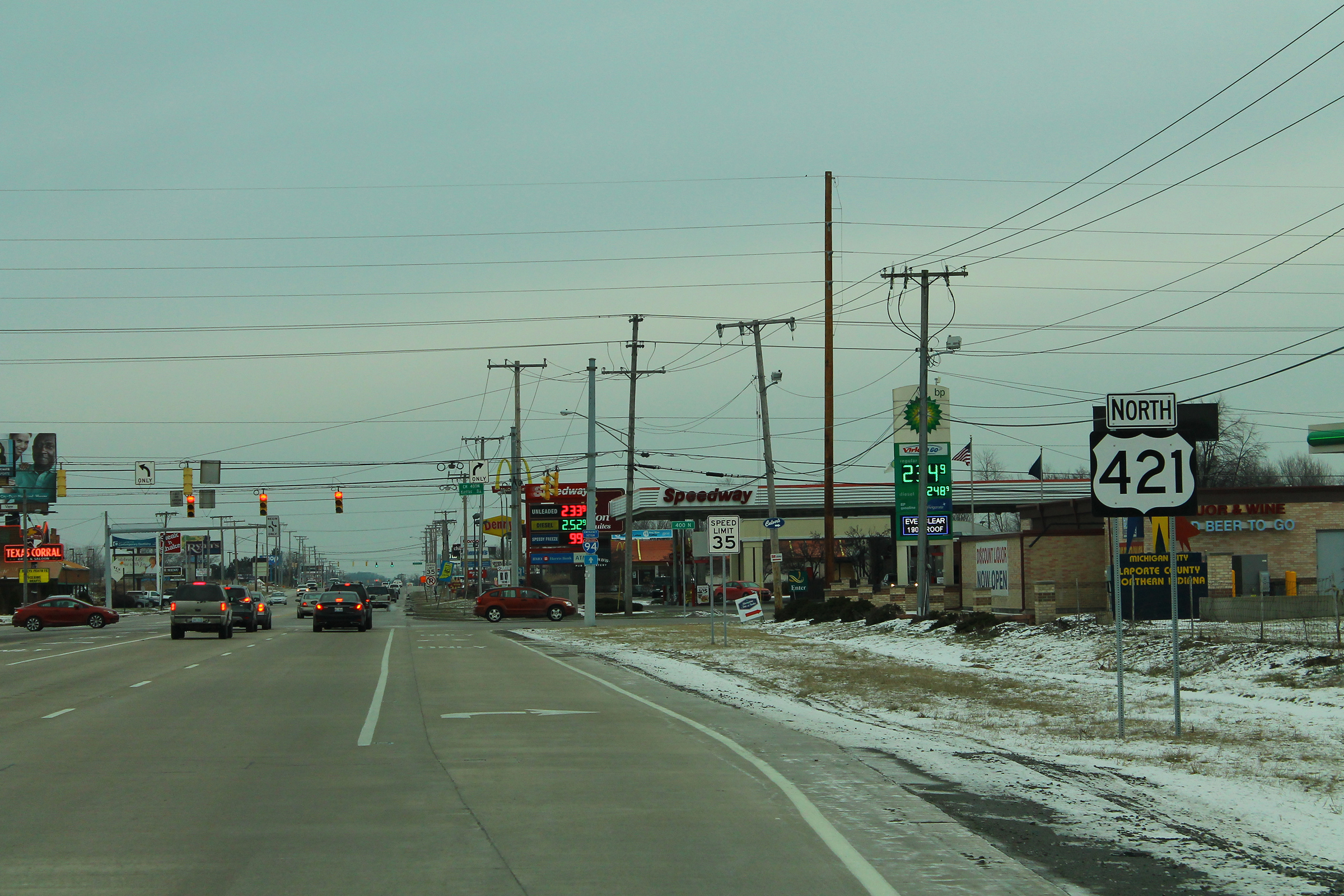
US 421 in Michigan City, just north of I-94

US 421 winds through the southern part of Indiana as it runs from Madison, in the southeastern part of the state, to Indianapolis. North of Greensburg, US 421 intersects and merges with I-74 west, through the Shelbyville area en route to Indianapolis. Originally, US 421 followed Southeastern Avenue into downtown Indianapolis, where it merged with US 40 (Washington Street) to West Street, then turned north, following West Street, Northwestern Avenue (later MLK Street), and Michigan Road up to the northwest side of the city. US 421 went past the Pyramids, an Indianapolis landmark. North of Indianapolis, US 421 continues to the north-northwest, providing a direct highway link between Indianapolis and Michigan City. US 421 ends at its junction with US 20 on the south side of Michigan City. Originally, the highway's end was a few miles north at the junction with US 12 near the shores of Lake Michigan.

== History ==
=== North Carolina ===
US 421 mainly followed the same route between Clinton and Wilmington. However, there are several old alignments from Clinton to the Tennessee state line.

- US 421 bypasses Clinton, old alignment uses local streets.
- Between Dunn and Sanford, uses an old alignment, fully connected.
- Between Goldston and Greensboro, uses several old alignments but not fully connected.
- Between Greensboro and Wilkesboro, uses multiple old alignments of different alignments. In *addition, they are no longer connected consistently.
- US 421 bypasses Wilkesboro, with a special US Business route.
- Between Deep Gap and Boone, uses a new alignment.
- Between Vilas and the Tennessee state line, uses an old alignment.

== Major intersections ==
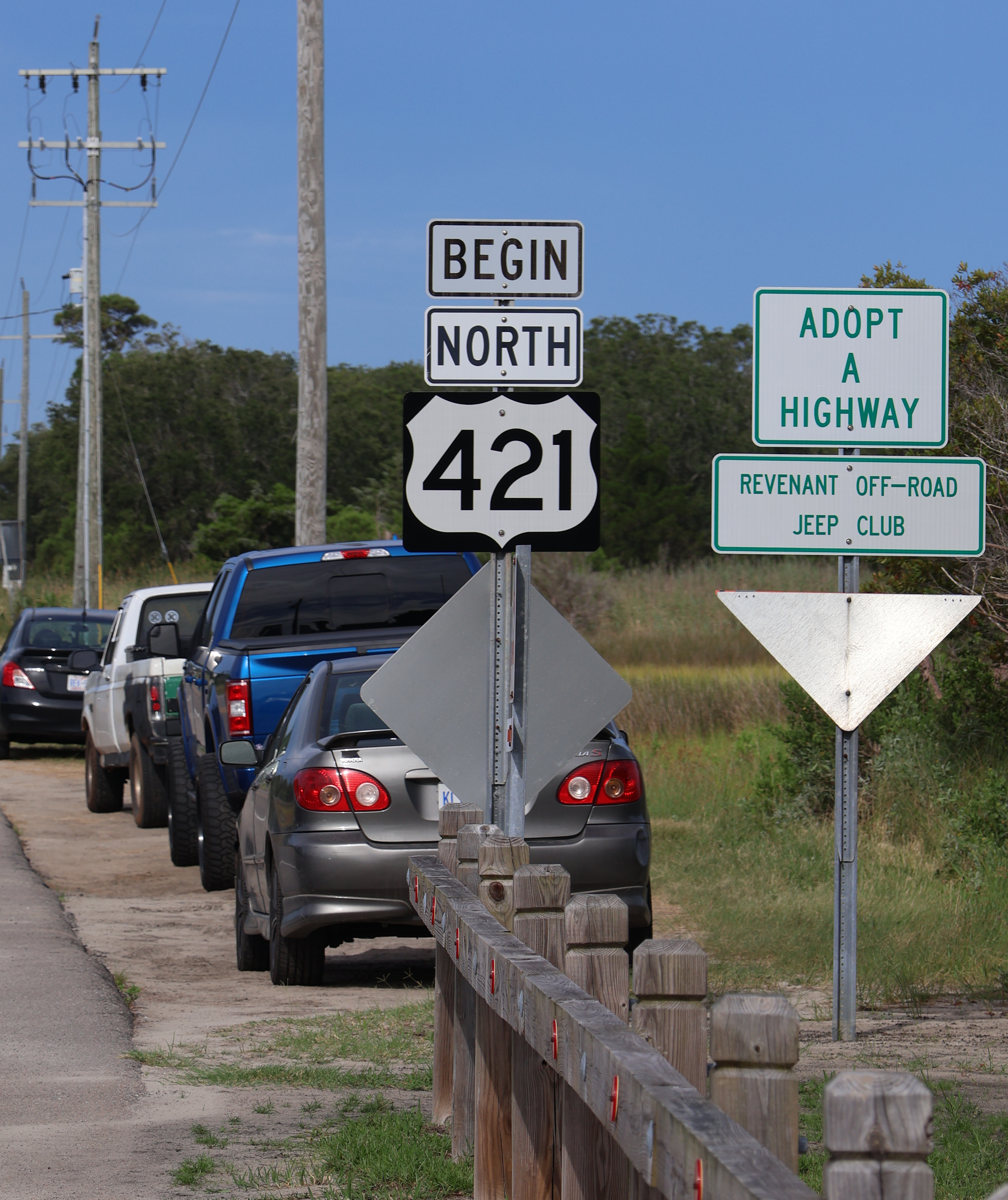
Beginning of US 421 near Fort Fisher State Recreation Area

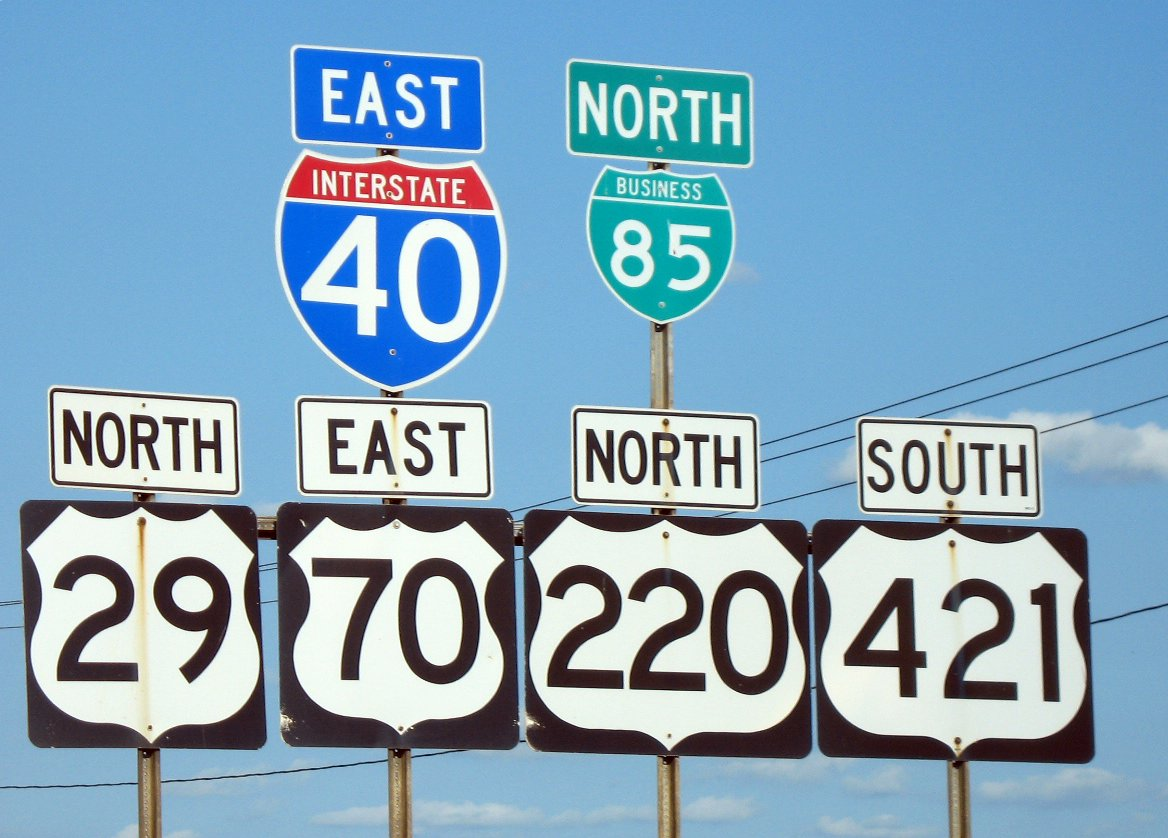
Concurrent highways through Greensboro, North Carolina (September 13, 2006). This sign is outdated, as US 220 was rerouted in 2008, US 421 was reassigned to the southern segment of the Greensboro Urban Loop in 2009, and US 70 was rerouted along Wendover Ave in 2023.

North Carolina
Parking area in Federal Point
US 117 in Wilmington
US 76 in Wilmington. The highways travel concurrently to Eagle Island.
US 17 / US 74 / US 76 on Eagle Island. US 17/US 421 travels concurrently to west of Wrightsboro. US 74/US 421 travels concurrently to southwest of Hightsville.
I-140 / US 17 west of Wrightsboro
US 701 south-southeast of Clinton. The highways travel concurrently to Clinton.
US 13 in Spivey's Corner
I-95 in Dunn
US 301 in Dunn
US 401 in Lillington. The highways travel concurrently through Lillington.
US 1 / US 15 / US 501 in Sanford
US 64 in Siler City
I-85 in Greensboro. The highways travel concurrently to south-southwest of Greensboro.
I-73 / US 220 south of Greensboro. I-73/US 421 travels concurrently to Greensboro.
I-85 / US 29 south-southwest of Greensboro
US 70 west of Greensboro
I-40 / I-73 / I-840 in Greensboro. I-40/US 421 travels concurrently to west of Greensboro.
US 158 in Winston-Salem. The highways travel concurrently through Winston-Salem.
US 52 / US 311 in Winston-Salem
I-40 in Winston-Salem
US 601 in Yadkinville
US 21 in Brooks Crossroads
I-77 west-northwest of Hamptonville
US 221 north-northeast of Deep Gap. The highways travel concurrently to Boone.
US 321 in Boone. The highways travel concurrently to north-northwest of Vilas.
Tennessee
US 11E / US 19 in Bristol. The highways travel concurrently to Bristol, Virginia.
Virginia
US 11 / US 11E / US 11W / US 19 in Bristol. US 11W/US 421 travels concurrently to the Tennessee–Virginia state line on the Bristol, Tennessee–Bristol, Virginia city line.
I-81 / US 58 in Bristol. US 58/US 421 travels concurrently to southeast of Woodway.
US 23 in Weber City. The highways travel concurrently to Duffield.
Kentucky
US 119 in Baxter. The highways travel concurrently to northeast of Baxter.
US 25 at the Blue Grass Army Depot south-southeast of Richmond. The highways travel concurrently to Lexington.
I-75 in Richmond
I-75 south-southeast of Lexington. The highways travel concurrently to Lexington.
US 60 in Lexington. The highways travel concurrently through Lexington.
US 27 / US 60 / US 68 in Lexington
US 62 northwest of Lexington. The highways travel concurrently to Midway.
US 60 in Frankfort. The highways travel concurrently through Frankfort.
US 60 / US 460 in Frankfort
US 127 in Frankfort. The highways travel concurrently through Frankfort.
I-71 west-southwest of Campbellsburg
US 42 in Bedford. The highways travel concurrently through Bedford.
Indiana
US 50 in Versailles. The highways travel concurrently through Versailles.
I-74 northwest of Greensburg. The highways travel concurrently to Indianapolis.
I-69 / I-74 / I-465 / US 31 / US 36 / US 40 in Indianapolis. I-69/I-465/US 36/US 40/US 421 travels concurrently through Indianapolis. US 31/US 421 travels concurrently to Carmel.
US 52 in Indianapolis. The highways travel concurrently through Indianapolis.
I-70 in Indianapolis
US 24 in Monticello. The highways travel concurrently to Reynolds.
US 30 in Wanatah
US 6 south-southeast of Westville. The highways travel concurrently to Westville.
I-80 / I-90 southeast of Otis
I-94 south of Michigan City
US 20 in Michigan City

== See also ==
- Special routes of U.S. Route 421
- U.S. Route 21
