= Lime Ridge, Pennsylvania =

Unincorporated community in Pennsylvania, US

- Census-designated place
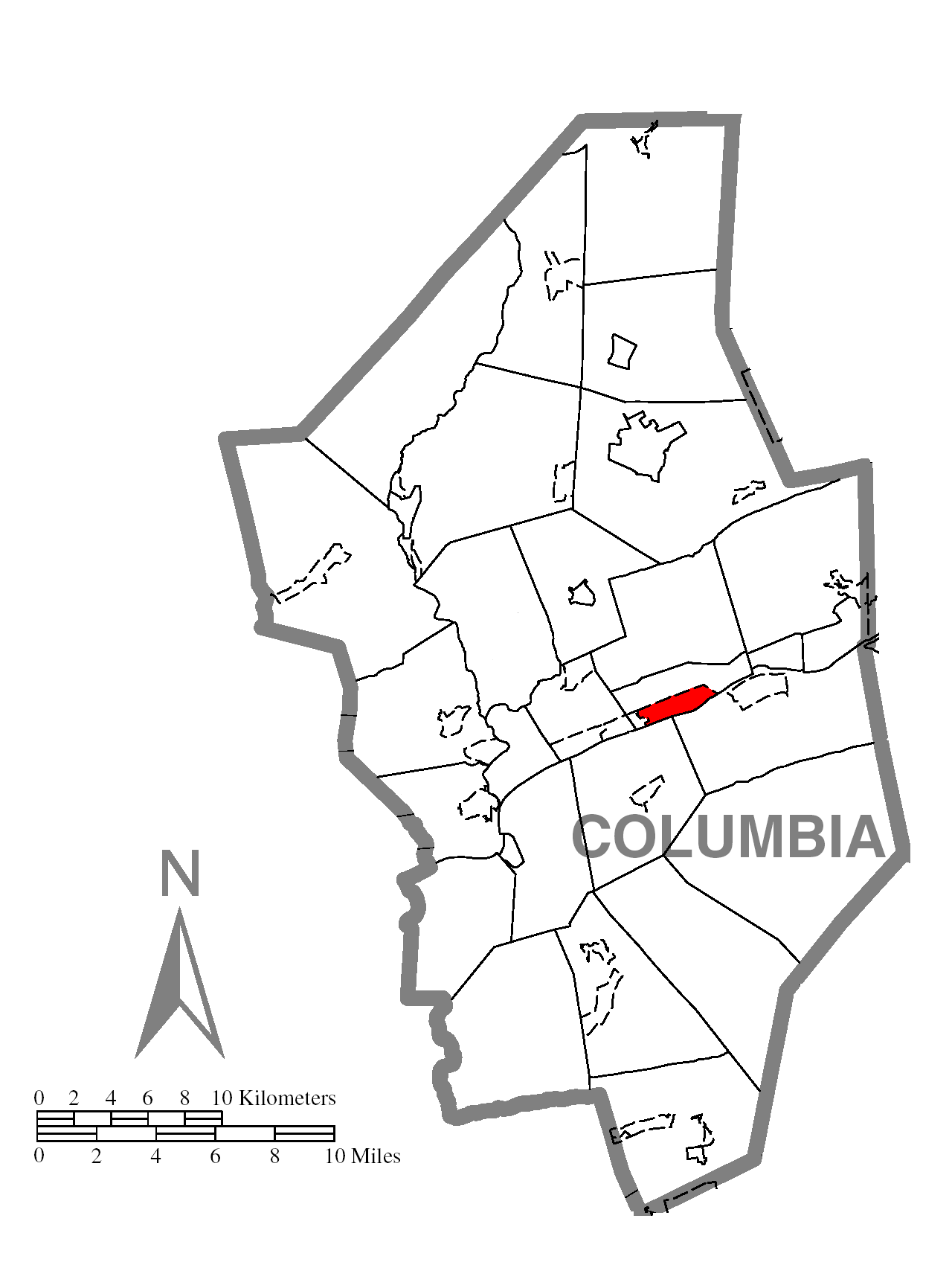
- Location within Columbia County

- Location within the U.S. state of Pennsylvania Lime; Ridge (the United States)
- Coordinates: 41°1′30″N 76°20′41″W
- Country: United States
- State: Pennsylvania
- County: Columbia
- Township: South Centre

Area
  - Total: 1.39 sq mi (3.60 km^{2})
  - Land: 1.13 sq mi (2.92 km^{2})
  - Water: 0.26 sq mi (0.68 km^{2})
- Elevation: 508 ft (155 m)

Population (2020)
  - Total: 823
  - Density: 731.2/sq mi (282.31/km^{2})
- Time zone: UTC-5 (Eastern (EST))
  - Summer (DST): UTC-4 (EDT)
- ZIP code: 17815
- FIPS code: 42-43320
- GNIS feature ID: 1179348

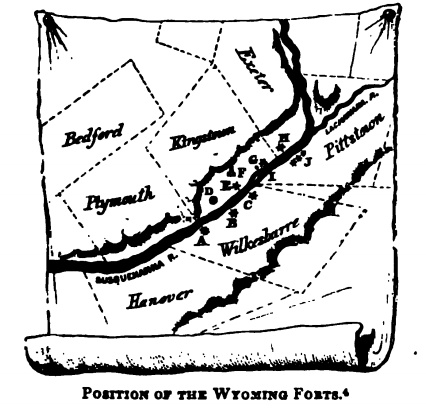
Wyoming Forts. A-Fort Durkee, B-Fort Wyoming or Wilkesbarre, C-Fort Ogden, D-Kingston Village, E-Forty Fort, G-battleground, H-Fort Jenkins, I-Monocasy Island, J-Pittstown stockades, G-Queen Esther's Rock.

Lime Ridge is a census-designated place (CDP) in Columbia County, Pennsylvania, United States. It is part of Northeastern Pennsylvania. The population was 823 at the 2020 census. It is part of the Bloomsburg-Berwick micropolitan area.

Lime Ridge is named for limestone deposits in the area.

== History ==
Fort Jenkins was built in Lime Ridge in 1778. In the early 1800s, limestone was discovered in Lime Ridge, and this limestone was used in Wilkes-Barre to build brick houses and in other places for the purpose of smelting.

== Geography ==
Lime Ridge is located in east-central Columbia County at 41°01′40″N 76°20′51″W (41.027696, -76.347514), in the southern part of South Centre Township. According to the United States Census Bureau, the CDP has a total area of 1.6 square miles (4.1 km^{2}), of which 1.3 square miles (3.4 km^{2}) is land and 0.27 square miles (0.7 km^{2}), or 18.15%, is water.

Lime Ridge is bordered to the south by the Susquehanna River, to the north by U.S. Route 11, to the east by Interstate 80, and to the west by Almedia. The CDP has mostly flat terrain. The Central Columbia High School, middle school, and elementary school are within the borders of Lime Ridge.

== Demographics ==
Historical population
Census	Pop.	Note	%±
2020	823		—
U.S. Decennial Census

As of the census of 2000, there were 951 people, 404 households, and 273 families residing in the CDP. The population density was 747.5 inhabitants per square mile (288.6/km^{2}). There were 431 housing units at an average density of 338.8 per square mile (130.8/km^{2}). The racial makeup of the CDP was 99.05% White, 0.11% African American, 0.11% from other races, and 0.74% from two or more races. Hispanic or Latino of any race were 1.37% of the population.

There were 404 households, out of which 28.0% had children under the age of 18 living with them, 53.0% were married couples living together, 11.1% had a female householder with no husband present, and 32.2% were non-families. 26.7% of all households were made up of individuals, and 9.9% had someone living alone who was 65 years of age or older. The average household size was 2.35 and the average family size was 2.82.

In the CDP, the population was spread out, with 21.1% under the age of 18, 7.6% from 18 to 24, 28.5% from 25 to 44, 27.3% from 45 to 64, and 15.5% who were 65 years of age or older. The median age was 40 years. For every 100 females, there were 88.7 males. For every 100 females age 18 and over, there were 83.4 males.

The median income for a household in the CDP was $36,324, and the median income for a family was $41,298. Males had a median income of $30,403 versus $21,985 for females. The per capita income for the CDP was $17,489. About 3.9% of families and 7.6% of the population were below the poverty line, including 2.1% of those under age 18 and 15.7% of those age 65 or over.

== Education ==
The school district is the Central Columbia School District.
