= Otis, Indiana =

- Unincorporated community
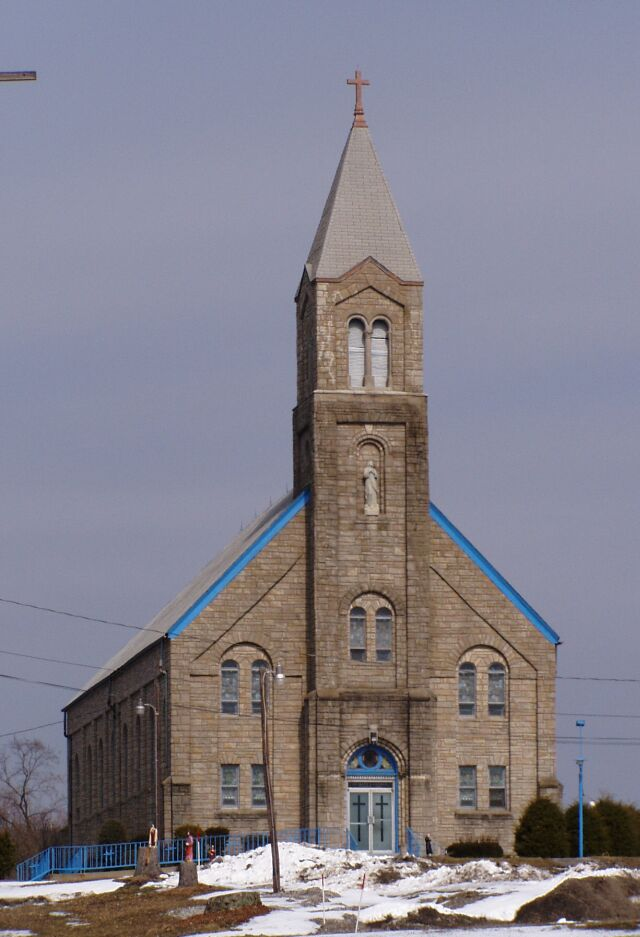
- St. Mary's Catholic Church, Otis

- Location within Indiana Location within the United States
- Coordinates: 41°35′57″N 86°54′21″W
- Country: United States
- State: Indiana
- County: LaPorte
- Township: New Durham
- Elevation: 748 ft (228 m)
- ZIP code: 46391
- FIPS code: 18-57204
- GNIS feature ID: 440729

Otis is an unincorporated community in New Durham Township, LaPorte County, Indiana.

== History ==
Settled in 1851, the town was named Salem Crossing by the Michigan Southern Railroad along whose tracks the community grew. By the time the village was platted in 1870, it was called LaCroix, courtesy of the Monon.

The town served as an important station during the Civil War since all soldiers from northern Indiana were required to travel by Monon troop trains south from LaCroix. The community bustled with the arrivals and departures of troops and the hotels and merchants thrived on the needs of soldiers for rooms, food and store goods.

It was along the Monon that the funeral train of the assassinated President Abraham Lincoln traveled to Illinois. Although the funeral cortege was not scheduled to stop at LaCroix, the crowd which had gathered around the refueling train was so large that the officials allowed the waiting people to view the body of the fallen president.

After the war, LaCroix was still called Salem Crossing by some. To eliminate the confusion, the town was given the name of the district congressman, General Packard. In 1872, Packard himself suggested the name of Otis. The town today is a small unincorporated community of farmers and commuters.
