= LeCrone =

LeCrone is a surname. Notable people with the surname include:

- Emery LeCrone (born 1986), American dancer and choreographer
- Megan LeCrone, American ballet dancer
