= Carolyn & Maurice LeBauer Park =

Park in downtown Greensboro, North Carolina

Coordinates: 36°4′29″N 79°47′17″W

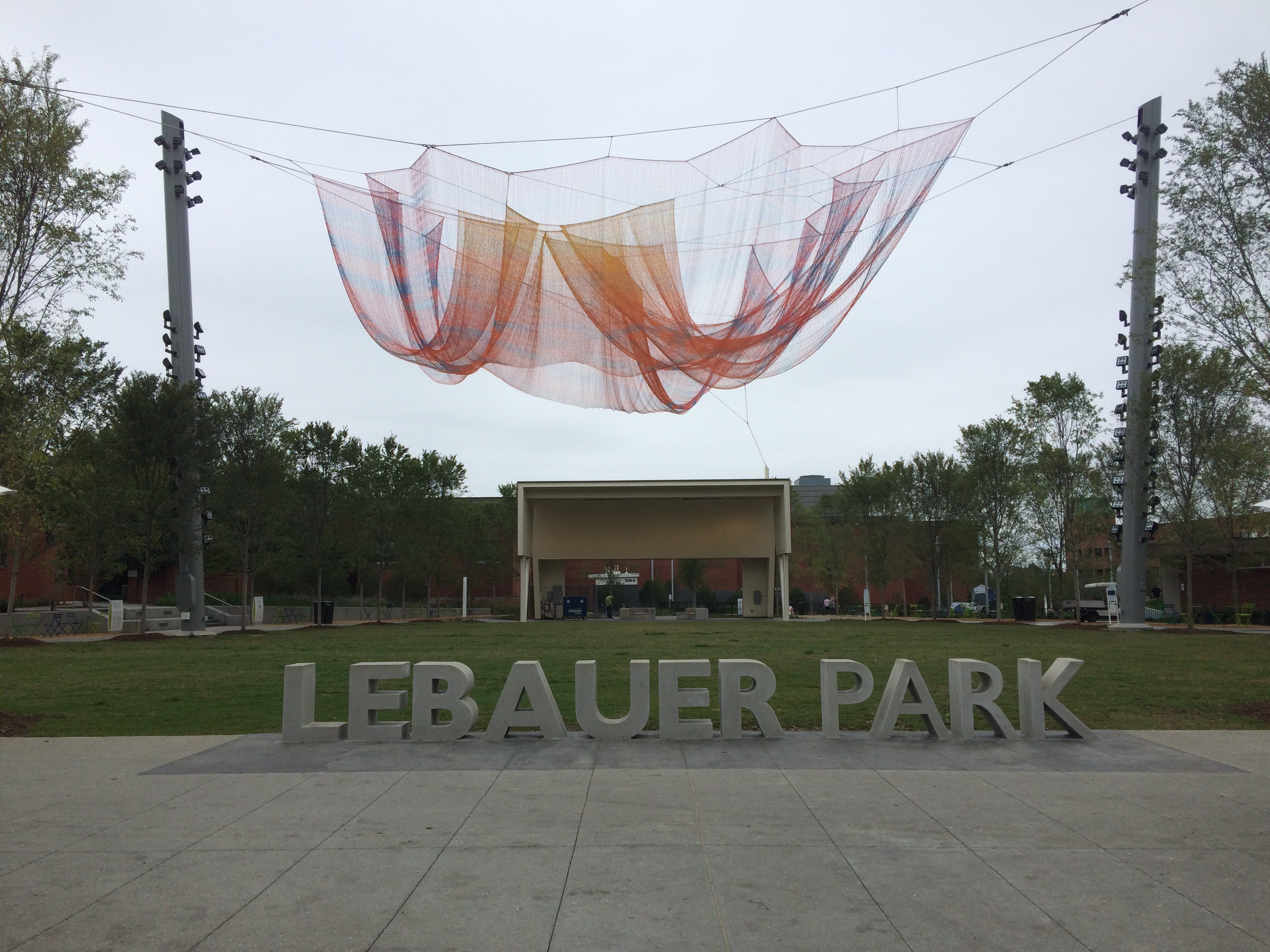
LeBauer Park

Carolyn & Maurice LeBauer Park, also known as LeBauer City Park, is a 4-acre $10 million park in downtown Greensboro, North Carolina which opened August 8, 2016.

Dr. Maurice LeBauer, who practiced medicine in the Jefferson Standard Building and became chief of surgery at Moses H. Cone Memorial Hospital, was the son of Joe LeBauer, who moved his silk hosiery operation to Greensboro in 1920. He was married to Carolyn Weill LeBauer and died in 1996.

In November 2012, the Community Foundation of Greater Greensboro announced a $10 million gift from the will of Carolyn LeBauer who wanted a new park in the city. On November 28, foundation president Walker Sanders announced a plan for Carolyn and Maurice LeBauer City Park as part of the performing arts center. It would be located on Summit Avenue between North Elm and North Davie Streets; Summit Avenue would be rerouted and would become Bellemeade Street. The site was the location of Festival Park, and a YMCA had once stood there. A steering committee started work in August 2013, and project coordinator Merrill McCarty said the 2.5-acre park, to be located on North Davie Street, would be "an anchor for the cultural campus", including the Greensboro Cultural Center, the Greensboro Historical Museum, and the Greensboro Public Library. McCarty said Carolyn LeBauer was "very specific about" including gardens.

A groundbreaking was held November 19, 2014. The previous day, designer Nathan Elliott of The Office of James Burnett of Solana Beach, California showed what the park would look like. It included a playground, fountains, and a dog park. The Price/Bryan stage was to be moved next to the Greensboro Historical Museum, and a 17,000-square-foot lawn would be used for events or movies related to the performing arts center.

A ribbon cutting on August 8, 2016 included a ceremony in Carolyn's Garden.

Greensboro Downtown Parks Inc., started by the Community Foundation, the City of Greensboro and Action Greensboro, manages LeBauer Park and Center City Park. The city owns both parks.

== Where We Met ==
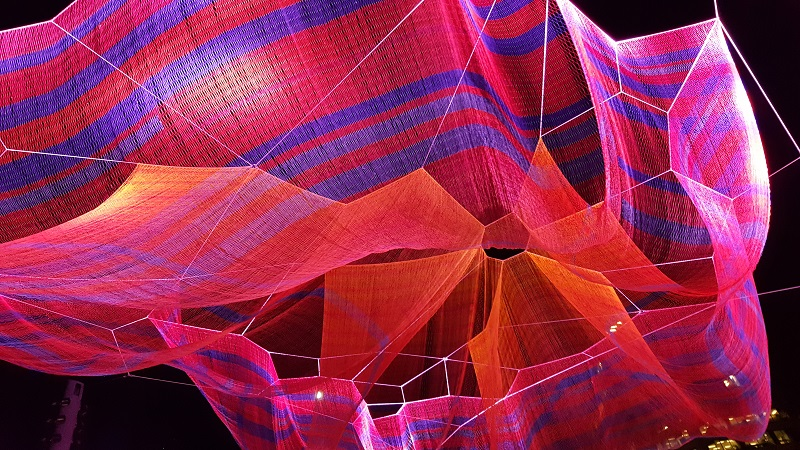
Where We Met by Janet Echelman

The Janet Echelman sculpture Where We Met, called "the largest outdoor art installation in the Southeast", was built with a $1 million grant from the Edward M. Armfield Sr. Foundation, is described as a "net of blue, red, yellow and orange, measuring 200 by 130 feet and suspended over the park’s Great Lawn." The structural layer includes 2800 feet of rope and is constructed of ultra-high-molecular-weight polyethylene (UHMWPE), which is stronger than steel. The sculptural layer is polytetrafluoroethylene with 35 miles of fiber and 242,800 knots. The design is inspired by the city's textile industry, particularly denim.

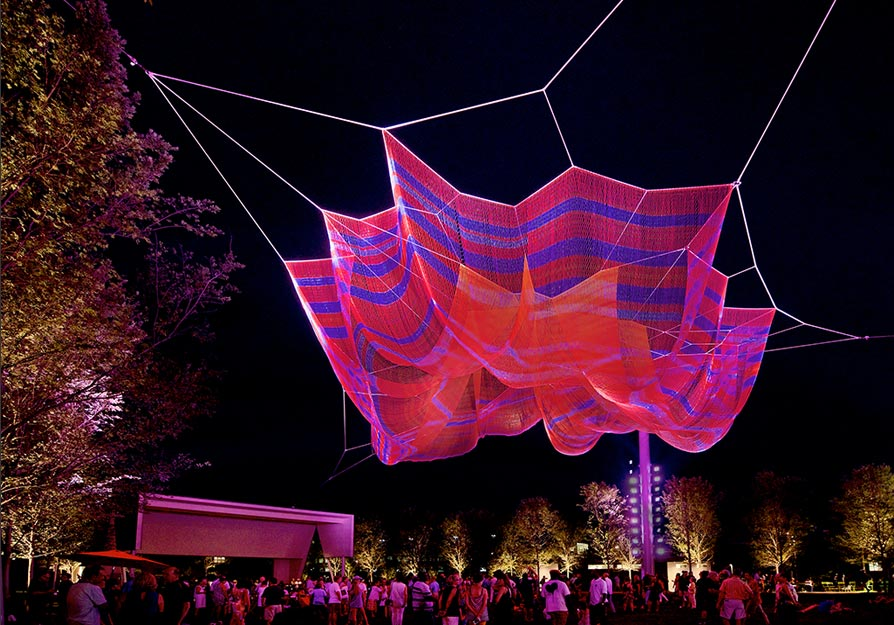
Where We Met by Janet Echelman
