= Kara Medoff Barnett =

American arts administrator

- Born: Kara Silber Medoff; September 26, 1978 (age 48); Durham, North Carolina
- Education: Greensboro Day School; Duke University; Harvard University
- Occupations: Business executive; producer; arts administrator
- Known for: Executive Director of American Ballet Theatre
- Spouse: Dov Mayer Barnett

Kara Silber Medoff Barnett (born September 26, 1978) is an American business executive, theatre producer, and arts administrator. She is the former managing director of Lincoln Center International and executive director of American Ballet Theatre. Since 2023, she has served as the managing director of the General Atlantic Foundation.

== Early life and education ==
Kara Silber Medoff was born on September 26, 1978, in Durham, North Carolina, as the first of six children to Dr. Jeffrey Roy Medoff, a gastroenterologist and owner of a clinical medical research company, and Debra Fran Silber, an attorney. She began training in ballet at the age of three in Chapel Hill, commuting from her family's home in Durham.

In 1986 her family moved to Greensboro and she enrolled as a student in the School of Greensboro Ballet, along with four of her siblings, training under John Dennis and Maryhelen Mayfield. She continued her ballet studies at the School of Greensboro Ballet while attending and later graduating from Greensboro Day School. She contemplated pursuing ballet professionally but, at 5-foot-9 inches, was considered too tall for many companies. Medoff earned a full Trinity Scholarship to attend Duke University, where she studied pre-medicine and dance and volunteered with the student-run Emergency Medical Services group. While a student, she was initiated as a member of Delta Delta Delta. After taking a course on Broadway productions taught by producer Emanuel Azenberg, Medoff changed her major to English with the hopes of becoming a Broadway producer. Medoff interned backstage on Broadway Shows for Azenberg and his production company and also spent a semester in New York City, through Duke's Leadership Philanthropy & the Arts program, meeting non-profit executives and directors of different New York arts organizations. She also spent a summer abroad in London studying the West End theatre and Shakespeare. Medoff graduated summa cum laude from Duke in 2000. She went on to earn her master's degree in Business Administration from Harvard Business School in 2007.

== Career ==
Medoff began working at the Lincoln Center for the Performing Arts during her last year at Harvard Business School through the HBS Leadership Fellows program, a program dedicated to connect graduating MBA students with nonprofit and public-sector arts organizations. After her fellowship year, Medoff remained at Lincoln Center, and worked as senior director of Lincoln Center's capital campaign and director of strategy and business development. In 2012 she was appointed as the managing director of Lincoln Center International, advising international clients on planning, building, and managing arts facilities. While serving as managing director, Medoff established advisory councils in China and Latin America on behalf of the Lincoln Center and welcomed foreign dignitaries including the Vice Premier and First Lady of China to the Center in New York City. In 2015, Medoff lead the launch of the Lincoln Center Global Exchange, a gathering of international leaders of various industries focused on exploring what roles art and culture play in facing critical challenges across the globe.

Medoff was a founding producer and board member of Ars Nova, an Off-Broadway theatre production company based in Hell's Kitchen, Manhattan. She produced theatre for Broadway and Off-Broadway, including the 2003 play Modern Orthodox. In 2003, at the 57th Tony Awards, she received a Tony Award for best revival of a play as an associate producer of Long Day's Journey into Night . She served on the advisory committee of the American Theatre Wing, which created and produces the Tony Awards.

She is a term member of the Council on Foreign Relations and a member of the Class of 2015 Henry Crown Fellows at the Aspen Institute. She was named "40 Under 40" by Crain's New York Business in 2014.

On January 13, 2016, Medoff was appointed the executive director of American Ballet Theatre, working alongside Artistic Director Kevin McKenzie. On February 16, 2016, Barnett assumed the position officially, succeeding Rachel S. Moore. McKenzie and Barnett announced their departures from ABT in 2021.

After leaving American Ballet Theatre, Medoff served as head of communications and social impact, as senior vice president of marketing and communications, and as managing director of the Foundation at First Republic. In 2023, she joined the General Atlantic Foundation as managing director.

== Personal life ==
On August 20, 2006, Medoff married Dov Mayer Barnett, a senior analyst for a New York real estate firm, in a Jewish ceremony at Aspen Mountain's Little Nell Resort in Aspen, Colorado. They have three children and live in New York.
