= Sang A Im-Propp =

South Korean fashion designer and singer

- Born: Im Sang-a; South Korea
- Education: Parsons School of Design
- Occupation: Fashion designer
- Years active: 2006–present
- Spouse: Jamie Propp (married 2001–2014)
- Website: sanga.com

Sang A Im-Propp, Korean name Im Sang-a (Korean: 임상아; Hanja: 林尚雅; born February 25, 1973), is a New York City-based fashion designer and former pop singer from South Korea. She founded the luxury handbag brand, Sang A, in 2006.

== Career ==
Im-Propp debuted as a singer in South Korea in 1996 with the album, Musical, which included the hit song of the same name. She released two more albums before deciding, during a visit to New York City, to leave the music industry and to pursue a career in fashion. She later studied at Parsons School of Design and interned under designer and stylist Victoria Bartlett.

Im-Propp launched her handbag company, Sang-A, in 2006. In 2007, she was awarded the Samsung Fashion Design Fund Award, and, in 2010, she was inducted into the Council of Fashion Designers of America.
