= Adrian McDonnell =

French conductor

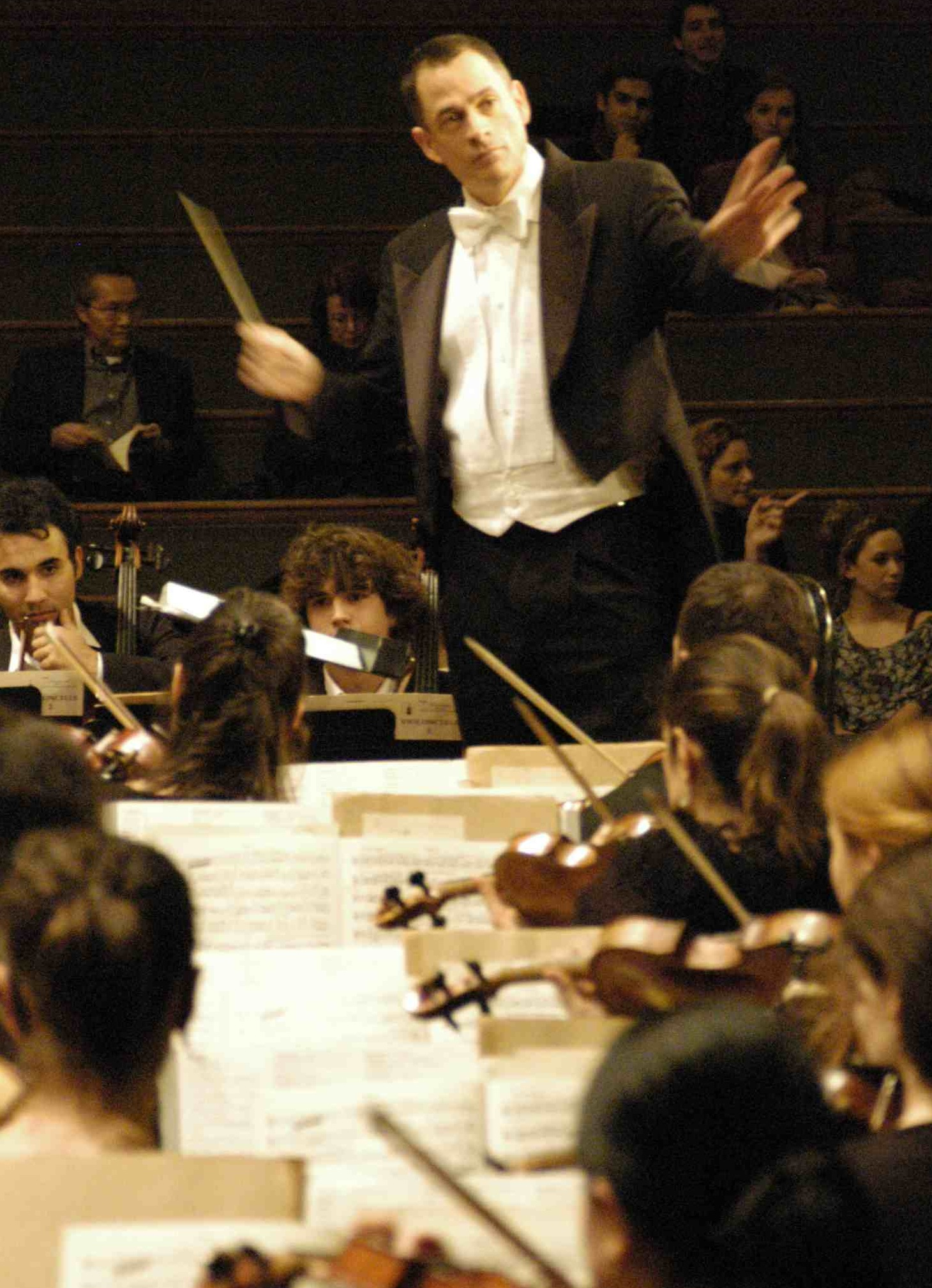
Adrian McDonnell

Adrian McDonnell (born 22 May 1959) is a Franco-American conductor in Greensboro, North Carolina.

== Life ==
A laureate conductor of the Yehudi Menuhin Foundation, McDonnell began his musical studies with the violin at the age of eight. At 19 years old he was selected by competition for the position of apprentice conductor for the State of North Carolina, where he studied conducting with Sheldon Morgenstern and Peter Paul Fuchs, then with Richard Pittman at the New England Conservatory in Boston and with Pierre Dervaux in France.

A former student of the Conservatoire de Paris in conducting, he also received the higher diploma in musical composition at the École Normale de Musique de Paris where he was a student of Michel Merlet.

Since 1990, McDonnell has been artistic director and conductor of the Cité Internationale Universitaire de Paris Orchestra. Since 2000, he has been teaching conducting at the Conservatory of the 15th arrondissement of Paris (Conservatoire Frédéric Chopin).

He has held permanent positions as a conductor with the Greensboro Symphony Orchestra, Greensboro Opera, Eastern Music Festival, Guilford Symphony Orchestra, Orchestre inter-conservatoires de la Ville de Paris, and has conducted numerous symphony orchestras in Europe and the United States as a guest conductor.

With a vast general repertoire, McDonnell has directed numerous creations in the field of contemporary music, including Lukas Foss, Maximo Flügelman, Amhed Essyad, Kryštof Mařatka, Jean-Michel Damase, Thierry Blondeau, Narcis Bonet, Henri-Jean Schubnel, John Moran, Olivier Penard, Yves Prin, Hélène Rasquier, Kasper T. Toeplitz, Larry Alan Smith...

In October 2007, McDonnell was awarded the Ordre des Palmes Académiques by the French government.
