= Carl Walter Roskott =

American composer

Carl Walter Roskott (March 4, 1953 - June 18, 2008) was an American composer, conductor and academic. He served as associate professor of music at Northern Illinois University and the University of Virginia, and as associate conductor at the Eastern Music Festival in Greensboro, North Carolina. He studied at the Peabody Conservatory of Music and New England Conservatory of Music; his principal teachers included Leonard Bernstein, Gunther Schuller, Sheldon Morgenstern, Leo Mueller, Richard Pittman and Michael Tilson Thomas.

Roskott's compositions included works for full orchestra, chamber ensembles, and solo works for trumpet, trombone, horn and violin. He was also a double recipient of the Leonard Bernstein Fellowship to Tanglewood.

In 1972, when he was 19, two of his works were included at the 1972 Eastern Music Festival in Greensboro, North Carolina. Four years later he returned to the festival as a conductor; the following year he was named the festival's associate conductor, a position he held until 1997.

In 1979 Roskott was a finalist for the assistant conductor position with the National Symphony also served as associate professor of music and principal conductor at Northern Illinois University (1980-1991) and the University of Virginia (1991-2005).

== Awards ==
- 1969 Junior Composer Award from National Federation of Music Clubs
- George Whitefield Chadwick Medal
- Dimitri Mitropoulos Award
- Downbeat Magazine Award for Best Symphony Orchestra Recording, 1980-1989
- Excellence in Undergraduate Teaching Awards (Northern Illinois University) (1989)
