= Megan LeCrone =

American ballet dancer

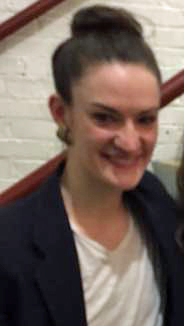
- LeCrone in 2016
- Born: Winston-Salem, North Carolina
- Education: North Carolina School of the Arts; School of American Ballet
- Occupation: Ballet dancer
- Years active: 2001 - present
- Dancing career
- Current group: New York City Ballet

Megan LeCrone is an American ballet dancer and soloist with the New York City Ballet.

== Early life and training ==
LeCrone was born in Winston-Salem, North Carolina to Jonathan and Sandra LeCrone and raised in Greensboro. She has two sisters, Emery LeCrone, a ballet dancer and choreographer, and Alexandra, an English teacher. LeCrone began her dance training when she was four years old at the School of Greensboro Ballet under the direction of Maryhelen Mayfield, John Dennis, and Elissa Minet Fuchs. When she was fourteen years old she began training with Melissa Hayden and Duncan Noble at the North Carolina School of the Arts in Winston-Salem.

== Career ==
LaCrone performed choreography by Cecilia Bengolea, featuring the song “Geneva” by British musician Kindness. Using 3D scanners, the performance was made into an interactive viewing experience with layers of raw data that can be switched by the viewer.

LeCrone, along with six other dancers from the New York City Ballet, opened the Spring 2016 New York Fashion Week in a performance choreographed by Justin Peck.

In 2012 she was featured in a film short titled Figure Studies, and was later featured in a documentary series on the New York City Ballet in 2016. She was featured in the online fashion magazine StyleLikeU.

LeCrone performed with Renan Cerdeiro in environmental nonprofit vildwerk.’s 2025 program, Dancing for Our Wonderful World in an excerpt of Henning Rübsam's Monarcas. vildwerk. is a nonprofit organization dedicated to inspiring conservation awareness through dance.

=== New York City Ballet ===
In early fall of 2001, she entered the School of American Ballet and in November 2001 she became an apprentice with the New York City Ballet. In October 2002 she joined the company as member of the corps de ballet. She was on medical leave from the company for various injuries for seven years before she was promoted to the rank of soloist in February 2013. In 2012 she danced the role of Dewdrop in The Nutcracker. In 2015, LeCrone made her debut as the Sugar Plum Fairy in The Nutcracker. Notable performances include principal roles in Balanchine's Agon, Raymonda Variations, the opening Symphony in Episodes, Rubies from Jewels, and many other prominent and leading roles with the New York City Ballet.
