= Janet Lilly =

American modern dancer

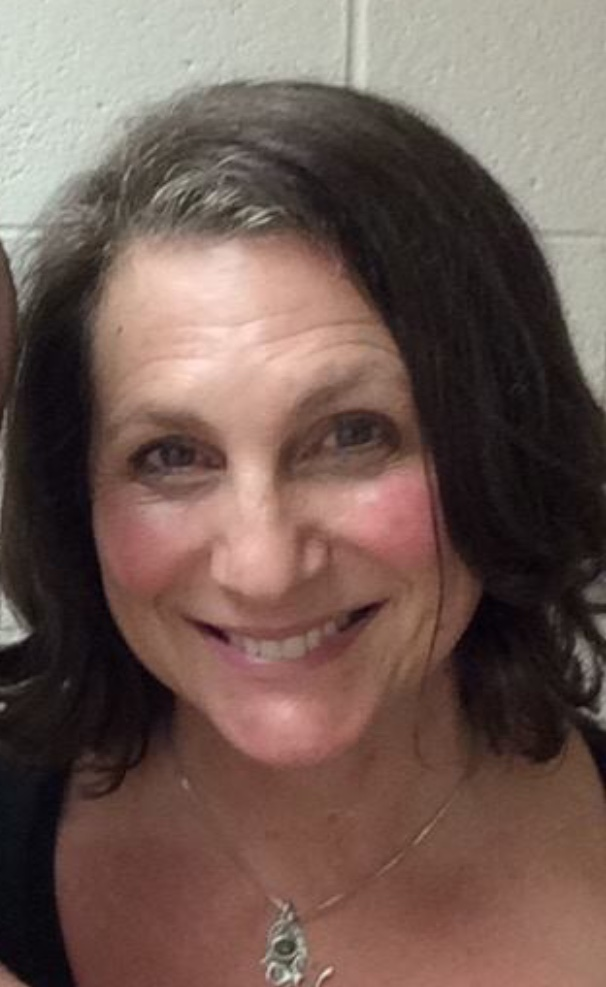

Director of the UNCG College of Visual and Performing Arts, School of Dance
- In office 2011–present
- Preceded by: Jan Van Dyke

Chair of the University of Wisconsin–Milwaukee's Department of Dance
- In office 2005–2009

Personal details
- Born: August 15, 1957 (age 69)
- Education: New York University; University of Michigan
- Occupation: dancer, choreographer, yogi, professor

Janet Lilly (born August 15, 1957) is an American modern dancer and choreographer. She was a principal dancer for Bill T. Jones and Arnie Zane's company from 1983 to 1991. She currently serves as the director of the UNCG College of Visual and Performing Arts, School of Dance at the University of North Carolina at Greensboro. From 2012 to 2014 she was the president of the Board of Directors of Iyengar Yoga National United States Association.

== Early life ==
Lilly grew up in Iowa City, Iowa and graduated from Iowa City West High School in 1975.

== Dance ==
Lilly graduated from New York University's Tisch School of the Arts in 1982 with a Bachelor of Arts in dance. She was a principal dancer with the Bill T. Jones/Arnie Zane Dance Company from 1983 until 1991. She also worked as a master teacher, rehearsal director, and choreographic assistant for the company. She went on to attend the University of Michigan's School of Music, Theatre & Dance for her graduate degree, graduating summa cum laude in 1992. Lilly taught at the Peck School of Art's Department of Dance at the University of Wisconsin–Milwaukee for fifteen years and served as the Dance Department chair from 2005 to 2009. In 2011 she joined the faculty of the UNCG School of Music, Theatre and Dance at the University of North Carolina at Greensboro, succeeding Jan Van Dyke as the Dance Department chair. In 2016, the Department of Dance became the School of Dance with the creation of the UNCG College of Visual and Performing Arts, with Lilly serving as director of the school. Lilly also serves on the Commission on Accreditation of the National Association of Schools of Dance.

=== Awards ===
- 2008–2009 Fulbright Lecturer Award
- 2001 National Endowment of the Arts Creation and Planning Grant

== Yoga ==
Lilly began studying Iyengar Yoga in 1992 while a student in graduate school, where she studied with Laurie Blakeney at the Ann Arbor School of Yoga in Michigan. She has been teaching since 1995. She has studied at the Iyengar Institute in Pune, India under B. K. S. Iyengar seven times. She was granted a four-month residency at the University of Pune. From 2012 to 2014 she was the president of the Iyengar National United States Association. She teaches yoga at the University of North Carolina at Greensboro and at Triad Yoga in Greensboro.
