= Larry Lavender =

American dancer and academic

Larry Lavender is an American dancer and dance scholar. He is the author of the book Dancers Talking Dance: Critical Evaluation in the Choreography Class.

== Biography ==
Lavender did not begin training in dance until he was a college student. He has a Master of Fine Arts degree in dance from the University of California, Irvine and a Ph.D. in dance education from New York University.

Lavender served as head of dance and director of the interdisciplinary undergraduate program at the University of New Mexico before joining the faculty at the University of North Carolina at Greensboro in the College of Visual and Performing Arts. From 2002 until 2006 Lavender served as head of the Dance Department at the University of North Carolina at Greensboro. In 2006 he was succeeded by Jan Van Dyke as department head and joined the teaching faculty in the department. His research focuses on dance criticism, performance art, dance theory, and choreography. He also teaches Master of Arts courses in the Liberal Studies Program and the Lloyd International Honors College at the University of North Carolina at Greensboro. Lavender is a choreographic mentor for the Montreal Danse Choreography Research Project.

In 1996 he wrote the book Dancers Talking Dance: Critical Evaluation in the Choreography Class.
