= Greensboro Ballet =

American ballet company

General information
- Name: Greensboro Ballet
- Local name: Greensboro Ballet
- Previous names: Greensboro Civic Ballet, Civic Ballet Theatre
- Year founded: 1964
- Principal venue: Carolina Theatre of Greensboro; Greensboro; United States
- Website: Greensboro Ballet

Senior staff
- Executive director: Jennifer Savage Gentry
- School director: Nina Bass Munda

Artistic staff
- Artistic director: Christine Cervino Grider

Other
- Associated schools: The School of Greensboro Ballet
- Formation: Principal; Soloist; Corps de Ballet; Apprentice

Greensboro Ballet and the School of Greensboro Ballet are a professional ballet company and pre-professional ballet school in Greensboro, North Carolina. It is the only ballet company in the Piedmont Triad. It is one of the few non-profit ballet companies in North Carolina. Greensboro Ballet has presented works by George Balanchine and a number of works made especially for the company by Rick McCullough, Jill Eathorne Bahr, Leslie Jane Pessemier, Elissa Minet Fuchs, and Emery LeCrone. Maryhelen Mayfield, who served as artistic and executive director of Greensboro Ballet from 1980 to 2019, choreographed over twenty-five works for the company.

== History ==
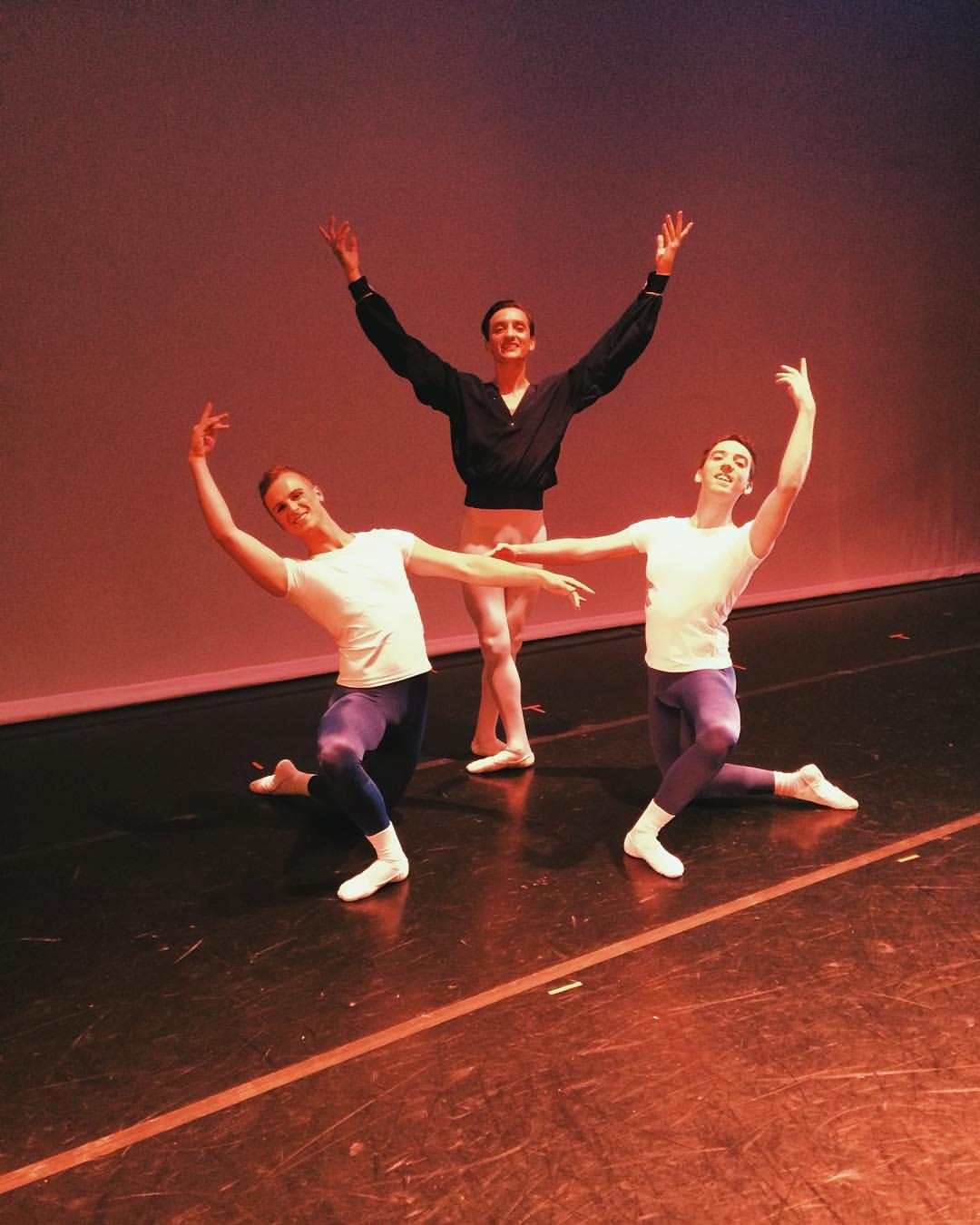
Greensboro Ballet dancers in 2017

In 1964 the Greensboro Civic Ballet was formed. The original focus was on providing local dancers with annual performances. In the 1970s the Greensboro Civic Ballet was reorganized under the name Civic Ballet Theatre and a ballet school was created. Organizers of the company approached the United Arts Council of Greensboro for membership as well as funding and space within the Greensboro Cultural Center. Elissa Minet Fuchs, a former soloist with the Metropolitan Opera Ballet of New York City and a dancer with Ballet Russe de Monte-Carlo, served as artistic director for one year before joining the board of directors. In 1980, Fuchs brought on Maryhelen Mayfield, a former dancer with the Kansas City Ballet, to serve Artistic Director and Executive Director. which performs primarily in Greensboro, North Carolina at the Carolina Theatre of Greensboro. Under the direction of Mayfield and John Dennis, director of The School of Greensboro Ballet, the school received membership in the Southeast Regional Ballet Association and became the first Honor Company in North Carolina, the highest level of membership within the Association. The name then changed from Civic Ballet Theatre to Greensboro Ballet. Professional dancers were introduced into the company in 1995.

Greensboro Ballet has performed with the accompaniment of the EMF Young Artists Orchestra of the Eastern Music Festival and with the Greensboro Symphony. While the company performs mainly in Greensboro, it has gone on tour various times throughout North Carolina.

In 2017, Greensboro Ballet company member Lauren Dorn became the first African-American to dance the role of the Sugar Plum Fairy in the company's production of The Nutcracker.

In November 2019, the Ballet's Board of Directors made a change in leadership, hiring a three directors to lead the Greensboro Ballet including: Executive Director - Jennifer Savage Gentry, an Interim Artistic Director, and School Director - Nina Bass Munda. These directors held Greensboro Ballet through the COVID pandemic. Christine Cervino Grider was hired as Artistic Director in 2022.

Greensboro Ballet's 2020 production of The Nutcracker received national attention by the CBS Morning News because Greensboro Ballet safely filmed its full-length holiday production at the Carolina Theatre and then presented this film in a Nutcracker Drive-In in the parking lot of the Greensboro Coliseum. This not only allowed its dancers the opportunity to perform, but supported other local businesses including the Carolina Theatre, Greensboro Coliseum, and filmmaker, Paul Byun.

That season, Greensboro Ballet also created a virtual production called A Benefit for Healthcare Heroes, offering a link to this performance of ballets and other works by local dance groups, at no cost, to the over 10,000 Cone Health employees.

In 2022, Alicia Mae Holloway performed the role of Sugar Plum Fairy as guest artists in The Nutcracker.

== Notable productions ==
Greensboro Ballet has performed a wide variety of ballets, including:

- Cinderella
- Coppélia
- Dracula
- The Firebird
- Giselle
- A Midsummer Night's Dream
- The Nutcracker
  - Muttcracker, a performance of Nutcracker with live dogs on stage
- Serenade
- The Sleeping Beauty
- Snow White
- Swan Lake
- Mozartiana
- Les Sylphides
- Valse Fantasia

== The School of Greensboro Ballet ==
The company also hosts The School of Greensboro Ballet, one of the few not-for-profit schools of classical Russian ballet in the Piedmont Triad, and the only school in Guilford County with access to Balanchine choreography. The school is located in the Greensboro Cultural Center. The Director of The School of Greensboro Ballet was John Dennis, a former dancer for the Dallas Ballet, from 1986 to 2019. He was succeeded by Nina Bass Munda, a former principal dancer with the company.

The School of Greensboro Ballet is supported by parents of students through the Ballet Resource and Volunteer Organization (BRAVO). The mission of BRAVO is to support the dance education of students at The School of Greensboro Ballet by fostering relationships among the school, parents, teachers, artistic staff and the Board of Directors. BRAVO provides financial support through fundraising activities and provides adult volunteers to assist the School of Greensboro Ballet students, artists and faculty.

=== Notable alumni ===
Notable alumni of the School of Greensboro Ballet include:

- Kara Medoff Barnett, Executive Director of American Ballet Theatre
- Katie Digby, founder and director of Digby Dance
- Emily Byrd Lawrence, meteorologist at WGHP
- Megan LeCrone, soloist with New York City Ballet
- Emery LeCrone, choreographer and dancer
- Brandon Alley, dancer with BalletBC

=== Notable faculty ===
- Elissa Minet Fuchs, former dancer with Ballet Russe de Monte-Carlo and the Metropolitan Opera Ballet
- Maryhelen Mayfield, former dancer with Kansas City Ballet

== Community outreach and programs ==
Greensboro Ballet has a number of programs for community outreach throughout Greensboro and North Carolina. Of these include:

- Build-a-Ballet Program - funded by Lincoln Financial Corporation, an original dance work is created by and performed at a different public school in Guilford County each year.
- City Dance - the company travels to various elementary schools in the area to teach ballet technique and movement classes, offering scholarships to the School of Greensboro Ballet to students who show promise.
- Dancing Above the Barre - a program for students with various disabilities that had in the past kept them out of dance classes
- Dance in the Schools (also called DITS) - the company travels to elementary schools in the Triad area to perform and educate children on the art of classical ballet.
- Out on the Town series - the company travels to perform in community centers, schools, and theaters in traditionally under-served areas.
- First Friday - Every first Friday of the month in downtown Greensboro, the Ballet Company participates in the First Friday festival.
- Annual shows where local school can attend a performance at the Carolina Theatre for low or no cost.

Greensboro Ballet also provides complimentary tickets to other non-profit organizations .
