= Jan Van Dyke =

American modern dancer (1941–2015)

- Born: April 15, 1941
- Died: July 3, 2015 (aged 74); Greensboro, North Carolina
- Education: Martha Graham School; Alwin Nikolais School
- Alma mater: University of Wisconsin; George Washington University; University of North Carolina at Greensboro
- Occupations: Dancer, choreographer, professor, scholar
- Spouses: John Gamble; John Robins; Jerry Varner

Jan Van Dyke (April 15, 1941 – July 3, 2015) was an American dancer, choreographer, dance educator and scholar who was a pioneer of modern and contemporary dance.

== Education ==
Van Dyke graduated from the University of Wisconsin with an undergraduate degree in dance. She was the first person admitted to the Columbian College of Arts and Sciences at George Washington University's Master of Arts in Dance Program. She received her Masters of Arts from George Washington University in 1966. In 1989 she enrolled as a doctoral student at the University of North Carolina at Greensboro, earning a degree in curriculum and educational foundations.

== Career ==
In 1967 Van Dyke founded the Georgetown Workshop dance studio with John Gamble. In 1970 she moved to New York City and studied modern dance with Merce Cunningham and at the Martha Graham School and the Alwin Nikolais School. She returned to Washington, D.C. in 1972 and established her own studio, the Dance Project, which became the leader in modern dance training and performance in D.C.. The Dance Project was designed to cultivate modern dance by providing technical training and performance opportunities. She founded a modern dance company, Jan Van Dyke and Dancers, which toured extensively throughout the United States and Europe. Van Dyke performed with her company and also as a solo artist. In 1980, she was honored by the Metropolitan Dance Association at their first annual dance awards for her work in the D.C. area. Two years later she relocated her dance company to San Francisco and became a faculty member for Footwork Studio. In 1985 she disbanded her company and moved to London to teach at the Laban Dance Centre. She later renamed the Dance Project as Dance Place and turned the organization over to Carla Perlo, and started up the Dance Project organization again in Greensboro, North Carolina in 1989, when she began working on her doctoral degree at the University of North Carolina at Greensboro. She earned an Ed.D. in curriculum and educational foundations and became a professor at the University of North Carolina at Greensboro. Her book, "Modern Dance in a Postmodern World" was published in 1992. Van Dyke taught dance at the university for twenty-three years and served as the Head of the Department of Dance from 2006 to 2011, succeeding Larry Lavender, before becoming professor emerita. Janet Lilly succeeded Van Dyke as head of the dance department.

She choreographed numerous works, including contemporary ballets for the Washington Ballet and the National Ballet of Washington, D.C. and works for students at the Western Australian Academy of Performing Arts at Edith Cowan University in Perth while she taught there for a semester in 2000.

Van Dyke and John Gamble reunited and formed the John Gamble/Jan Van Dyke Dance Company. Van Dyke founded and directed the Van Dyke Dance Group, the School at City Arts, and the non-profit North Carolina Dance Project, which runs the North Carolina Dance Festival and is based at the Greensboro Cultural Center. She was a recipient of a North Carolina Choreography Fellowship and was a 1993 Fulbright Scholar. In 2001 she was awarded the North Carolina Dance Alliance Annual Award for her contributions to the development of dance in North Carolina. Dance Teacher Magazine awarded her with the Dance Teacher Award for Higher Education in 2008. The University of North Carolina at Greensboro honored Van Dyke with the Gladys Strawn Bullard Award for Leadership and Service in 2010. In 2011, she was presented with the Betty Cone Medal of Arts Award by the United Arts Council of Greensboro.

In early July 2015, Van Dyke stepped down as director of the Dance Project and School at City Arts due to declining health. The organization's board of directors selected Lauren Trollinger Joyner and Anne Morris to be the new co-directors.

=== Written works ===
Scholarly works by Van Dyke include:

- An interpretive study of meaning in dance: Voices of young women students (1988)
- The Voices of Young Women Dance Students (1990)
- Modern Dance in a Postmodern World (1992)
- Gender and Success in the American Dance World (1996)
- Choreography as a Mode of Inquiry: a Case Study (1998)
- Smart Audiences Will Keep More Homegrown Artists at Home (1998)
- Art and Place: The Local Connection (1999)
- Intention: Questions regarding its role in choreography (2001)
- Teaching Choreography: Starting with Craft (2005)
- Redefining Excellence (2009)
- A Realistic Look at Graduating Dance Majors: Problems and Solutions (2010)
- Vanishing: Dance Audiences in the Postmodern Age (2010)
- Questioning Trends in Higher Education (2012)

=== Awards ===
- Metropolitan Dance Association Award for Outstanding Service to the Field, Washington, DC. (1979)
- Fulbright Scholar to Portugal (1993)
- Choreography Fellowship from the North Carolina Arts Council (1993)
- NC Dance Alliance Annual Award for Contributions to the Development of Dance in North Carolina (2001)
- Copperfoot Award for Choreography from the Dance Department at Wayne State University (2005)
- Dance Teacher Award for Higher Education from Dance Teacher Magazine (2008)
- Choreography (SPIKE) selected for Sharing the Legacy Conference, Masterworks of the 20th Century concert at Hunter College, New York City (2008)
- Gladys Strawn Bullard Award for initiative and perseverance in leadership and/or service from UNC Greensboro (2010)
- Betty Cone Medal of Arts from the United Arts Council of Greensboro (2011)

== Personal life and death ==
Van Dyke was married three times; first to John Gamble, then to John Robins, and then to Jerry Varner. She died on July 3, 2015, in Greensboro, North Carolina, at the age of 74 after battling primary peritoneal cancer for two and a half years. A memorial service was held on August 22, 2015, in the Dance Theater in the Mary Channing Coleman Building on the campus of the University of North Carolina at Greensboro and was also live streamed for those who could not attend.

== Legacy ==
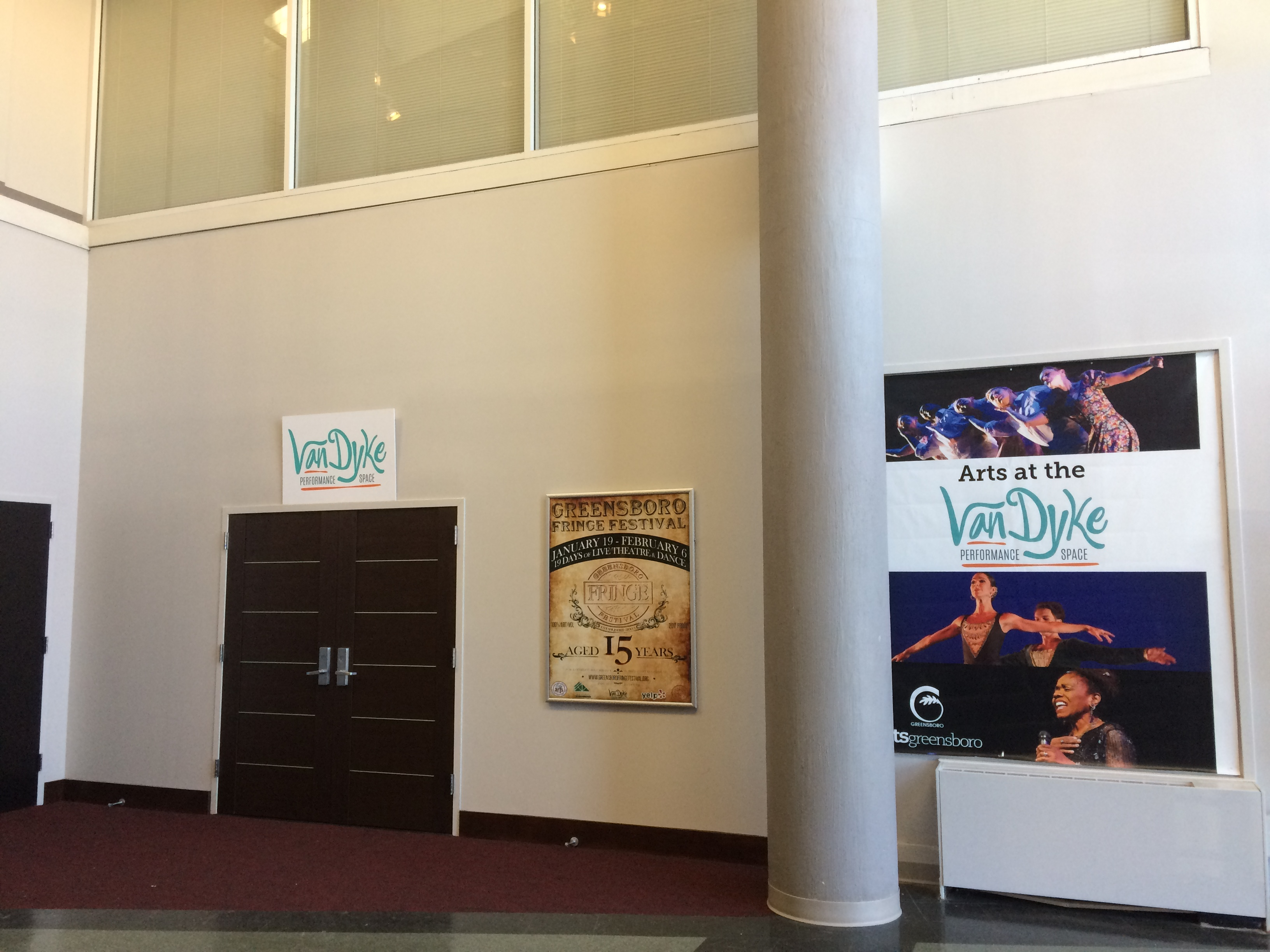
Van Dyke Performance Space in the Greensboro Cultural Center

Van Dyke left one million dollars to the United Arts Council of Greensboro, which used the funds to build the Van Dyke Performance Space, a 7,500 square foot black-box dance theater on the first floor of the Greensboro Cultural Center.

The 25th North Carolina Dance Festival in 2015 was dedicated to Van Dyke.
