= Victoria Bartlett =

British designer

- Born: Gloucester, England
- Education: London College of Fashion
- Labels: VPL; Never Before; Undisclosed Recipients
- Awards: 2012 International Woolmark prize finalist; 2012 CFDA Lexus Eco Challenge Winner; 2007 CFDA/Vogue Fashion Fund Finalist; 2007 Fashion Group International Rising Start Award Finalist; 2006 Ecco Domani Award

Victoria Bartlett is a British-born designer and stylist. She graduated from the London College of Fashion.

== Career ==
Her career began in design, illustration, and brand consultancy for a prestigious portfolio of brands and designers, including Miu Miu, Versace, Moncler, and Calvin Klein. She was the stylist of the first Victoria's Secret Fashion Show in 1995. Bartlett gained accolades styling for Björk, Madonna, Scarlett Johansson, David Bowie, Pharrell Williams, and Venus Williams etc. She was Fashion Editor at Allure magazine prior to becoming Fashion Director for Interview and BIG Magazine. She has created fashion editorials for i-D, Numéro, V, French, Italian, and L'Uomo Vogue. She has consulted and still consults for artists and choreographers, including Ugo Rondinone, Kai Althoff, John Giorno, Rosa Barba, Maria Hassabi, and Pam Tanowitz for the Royal Opera House, among others.

Bartlett launched her fashion line VPL (brand) in 2003, filling a niche between lingerie and sportswear. She opened a store in 2009-2016 in SoHo. After VPL she launched a second fashion active line called Never Before with Stella Ishii.

She launched in 2021 her collection of structural forms and furniture called Undisclosed Recipients with Zachary Joslow. They showed in 2021 in a group show with Tschabalala Self at Gallery 495, and in 2025 at CANADA Gallery in partnership with Anthony Cox (producer).

In 2023, Victoria Bartlett participated in the collective show "Sound The Mouth Can’t Make" at CASE Gallery in Los Angeles, together with Rebecca Watson Horn and Andros Zins-Brown.

== List of achievements ==
- 1999 Participated in the Brooklyn Anchorage Exhibition presented by Creative Time called "Exposing the meaning in Fashion through Presentation", curated an installation called Loud & Unhinged with film director Douglas Keeves, art director Richard Pandiscio and set designers Big Room.
- 2002 Designed the clown sculptures for Ugo Rondinone's exhibition If There Were Anywhere But Desert at Mathew Marks Gallery
- 2005 Participated in FutureFashion's kickoff event for Christo and Jean-Claude's installation of The Gates in Central Park to benefit the Earth Pledge foundation
- 2009 Curated "A Candid look at the Anatomical fascination of Visible Panty Line" with Susanna Cucco and Gloria Capeletti at Gallery Dopolavoro in Milan
- 2011 Curated the show Squat with Orly Genger hosted by Yvonne le Force Villareal of Art Production Fund and Clarissa Dalrymple
- 2011 Designed costumes in latex for a special performance installation at Cedar Lake Contemporary Ballet with choreographer Benoit Swan
- 2011 Collaborated with choreographer Emery LeCrone and Avi Scher for Works & Process at the Guggenheim Museum set to the music of Pulitzer Prize composer Elliott Carter
- 2011 Participated in the sartorial exhibition Limited/Unlimited conceived by Silvia Venturini Fendi and curated by Susanna Cucco in Rome
- 2012 Curated the group show Second skin with 14 artists including Ugo Rondinone, John Giorno, Sarah Lucas, Genesis P-Orridge, Collier Schorr, Jack Pierson, Adam McEwen, Philip-Lorca diCorcia, David Armstrong, Judith Eisler, Jessica Mitrani, Shoplifter, Mark Borthwick and Katerina Jebb
- 2012 Winner of the CFDA/Lexus Eco Challenge
- 2013 "Lightness of Being" live clown sculpture collaboration with Ugo Rondinone for the Public Art Fund in City Hall Park
- 2014 Snoopy & Belle in Fashion 30 years of fashion, recreated outfits of VPL Designs along with 26 other designers including Calvin Klein for an exhibition tour starting at New Museum, New York
- 2015 Designed costumes for Emery LeCrone's "The Innermost Part of Something" at The Joyce Theater for the New Ballet Festival
- 2015- 2016 Collaborated with artist Ugo Rondinone for the show I Heart John Giorno at Palais de Tokyo, Paris for the multi-channel video installation “Thanks 4 Nothing”, a recital of artist John Giorno's poem.
- 2016 Collaborated with artist Kai Althoff for his exhibition "and then leave me to the common swifts" at the Museum of Modern Art in New York City designed and created the tent as an integrated part whole exhibition/costumes for the installation and a film for Barbara Gladstone as a component of the MOMA exhibition.
- 2016 Designed costumes for Maria Hassabi's performance “STAGED” at The Kitchen (art institution), later shown at the River to River festival (presented by the Public Art Fund), New York, Xing Live Arts Festival, Bologna, Italy, Kunstenfestivaldesarts, Brussels, Belgium, Onassis Cultural Center, Athens, sv: Wanås Konst, Sweden (2017), Actoral Festival, Marseille, France, Barnes Foundation, Philadelphia, United States (2018)
- 2017 Collaborated with artist Ugo Rondinone for the show I Heart John Giorno in this multi part exhibition, at Sky Art Gallery and Red Bull Gallery for a multi-channel video installation "Thanx 4 Nothing" a recital of poet John Giorno's most renowned work
- 2017 Designed costumes for Maria Hassabi's performance of "STAGING" shown at documenta 14, Kassel, Germany, Aarhus 2017 - European Capital of Culture, Aarhus, Denmark, Evergreen/Don River Valley Park, Toronto, Canada, and at the Walker Art Center as part of Merce Cunningham's "CO;MM;ON T:IME" exhibition.
- 2017 Contributed a costume for the Exhibition “The Overworked Body: An Anthology of 2000s Dress” at MINI/Goethe-Institut Curatorial Residencies
- 2018 Designed costumes for Maria Hassabi's performance of ”STAGING : SOLO #2” at K20, Düsseldorf, Germany for artist Carmen Herrera'show “Lines of Sight, for MOVE at Centre Pompidou, Paris, France + Block Universe, London, United Kingdom + Point Centre for Contemporary Art, Nicosia, Cyprus
- 2017 Designed costumes for Maria Hassabi's performance of "STAGING: solo" shown at Material Art Fair, Mexico City, Mexico. + Oslo Internasjonale Teaterfestival, Black box theater, Oslo, Norway, + Centrale Fies, Dro, Italy + Zachęta – National Gallery of Art, Warsaw, Poland (2018) and Walker Art Center, Minneapolis, United States (2021)
- 2017 Designed costumes for Maria Hassabi's performance of ”STAGING: solo 2” shown at Kunstsammlung Nordrhein-Westfalen, Düsseldorf, Germany (2017), and Centre Pompidou, Paris, France
- 2019 Designed costumes for Maria Hassabi's performance "TOGETHER" (2019) Pulitzer Arts Foundation, St Louis, United States, Inspired by the exhibition on view "Striking Power: Iconoclasm in Ancient Egypt", + Centre d'Art Contemporain Genève, Switzerland, + MUDAM, Luxembourg + Buffalo Grandi Pianure, Palazzo delle Esposizioni, Rome, Italy, Künstlerhaus Bregenz, Austria
- 2019 Designed costumes for Maria Hassabi's performance of "FIGURES" at Aixoni Sculptural Theater, Athens, Greece, GIACIMENTO in the frame of Matera 2019 - European Capital of Culture, Matera, Italy
- 2019 Designed costumes for Maria Hassabi's performance of "Entre Deux Actes (Ménage à Quatre)" at The Kitchen/Performa 19, New York, US
- 2021 Designed outfits for Maria Hassabi's performance "HERE" at Vienna Secession, Austria
- 2022 designed outfits for Marie Hassabi's performance "CANCELLED" in Arles at LUMA Foundation
- 2023 created outfits for Maria Hassabi's performance "ON STAGE" at Tanzquartier, Vienna
- 2023 created outfits for Maria Hassabi's performance "I'll Be Your Mirror" at Tai Kwun, Hong Kong
- 2023 created a textile sculpture for the exhibition "The sounds The Mouth Can't Make" in a collective show, in collaboration with Rebecca Whatson Horn and Andros Zins-Browne for CASE gallery Los Angeles
- 2024 Undisclosed Recipients exhibited three sculptural Forms in the group show “LULL” AT GALLERY 495, Catskills
- 2025 Undisclosed recipients exhibited three sculptural Forms in the group show for the exhibition “Hubba Hideout” with Tony Cox (Club Rhubarb) in partnership with CANADA Gallery
