= Sheldon Morgenstern =

American conductor (1938–2007)

Sheldon Morgenstern (1 July 1938 – 17 December 2007) was an American conductor, and founder of the Eastern Music Festival.

== Youth and music training ==
Morgenstern spent his youth in Cleveland where he was born, then in Greensboro, North Carolina. After studying music in childhood and adolescence at the Brevard Music Festival and with Ernst von Dohnanyi at the Florida State University, he continued his university studies at Northwestern University where he studied the French horn with the famous horn player Philip Farkas. Graduated as a horn player, he joined the Atlanta Symphony Orchestra where he played as an attending for several seasons. Then he moved to Boston where he studied conducting with Frederik Prausnitz at the New England Conservatory.

== Eastern Music Festival ==
In 1962, he founded in Guilford College (Greensboro) the Eastern Music Festival which became a major centre for summer classical music in the United States, and where great artists and teachers will regularly participate, such as Joseph Gingold, Leonard Rose, Dorothy DeLay, Gérard Poulet, Gary Karr, the Beaux Arts Trio, the Guarneri String Quartet, Robert Bloom, John Mack, Leon Fleischer, Charles Rosen, Vic Firth, Franco Gulli, Jaime Laredo, Lukas Foss, Peter Paul Fuchs, Gunther Schuller.

The Eastern Music Festival presents an extensive programme of instrumental classical musical each season, featuring three orchestras, 16 different programmes, numerous chamber ensembles, and nearly 250 instrumentalists, including 40 pianists. The quality of the festival's programming earned Morgenstern two ASCAP programming awards.

Morgenstern devoated most of his musical career to developing and maintaining the artistic and pedagogical level of this summer festival. The festival's student interns are hand-picked from a large number of candidates each year in America and Europe. Among the alumni of this festival are Wynton Marsalis, Paul Phillips (conductor), Adrian McDonnell, Antoine Tamestit, Guillaume Sutre.

== Career as conductor ==
For nearly 40 years, Morgenstern has conducted orchestras all over the world. He had permanent links with orchestras where he conducted regularly in Budapest, Geneva, Seville, Warsaw, and he often conducted on radio waves in America with the orchestras of the Public Broadcasting Service, the National Public Radio, the Canadian Broadcasting Company, as well as in Europe with the BBC and radio orchestras on the continent.

== Other activities and commitments ==
Morgenstern served as a consultant and evaluator for the National Endowment for the Arts, advisor to the Wolf Trap Festival, member of the board of directors of the Istanbul International Festival and the National Company for Televised Theater.

Beyond his efforts and contributions in the musical field, Morgenstern was very committed to efforts for social justice. He was a member of several organizations including the Southern Poverty Law Center.

Morgenstern died in Geneva.

== Publications ==
In 2001, Morgenstern published No Vivaldi in the Garage, a book in which he recounted anecdotes from his professional experience, but also denounced the "disastrous" management of the arts in the 1990s at the institutional, political and industrial levels.

== Sources ==
- No Vivaldi in the Garage, A Requiem for Classical Music in North America: 2001, Northeastern University Press, ISBN 1-55553-493-7
- Greensboro News & Record, 20 December 2007 (obituaries)
- Eastern Music Festival bulletins et programmes (1990 to 2007)
