= Emery LeCrone =

American dancer and choreographer (born 1986)

- Born: Oct. 2 1986; Greensboro, North Carolina
- Occupations: ballet dancer, choreographer
- Years active: 2006-Present
- Career
- Current group: Metropolitan Opera
- Former groups: Greensboro Ballet; North Carolina Dance Theatre; School of American Ballet
- Website: emerylecrone.com

Emery LeCrone is an American dancer and choreographer. Currently she dances professionally with the Metropolitan Opera in New York City. She is an established choreographer who has presented and produced numerous large scale productions with her own chamber company, Emery LeCrone DANCE, founded in 2013. LeCrone's choreography has been commissioned by the Colorado Ballet, Oregon Ballet Theater, Minnesota Dance Theater, North Carolina Dance Theater, and the Saint Louis Ballet, among others.

Career highlights include a collaboration with the designer Yigal Azrouël for the Guggenheim Works & Process series in 2014. As well as a full-length evening of her choreography for The Joyce Theater's Ballet Festival in 2017.

While working within the classical vocabulary, LeCrone incorporates pedestrian movements that are strikingly tender. The steps look like ballet, but they're less formal, more rugged and athletic and her dancers are certainly not afraid of the floor. Intense movements with silent yet intimate exchanges between dancers are emblematic of LeCrone's choreographic style.

Brian Seibert of The New York Times has written about her work "Emery LeCrone is a skilled and sophisticated choreographer who is attentive to music and musical form. Mostly abstaining from easy sensationalism, she is laudably committed to the harder task of making dance work as dance, almost solely through abstraction rather than narrative. He elaborates "Ms. LeCrone's divergences from classical ballet are all in the direction of increasing a ribbonlike flow — blending in the rolling floor contact of contemporary dance and braiding sections with adroit overlapping.

She grew up in North Carolina and trained at the School of Greensboro Ballet under Elissa Minet Fuchs, John Dennis, and Maryhelen Mayfield. LeCrone spent summers at intensives at the School of American Ballet. She graduated from the North Carolina School of the Arts before joining the North Carolina Dance Theatre. She began choreographing in 2006. She was the resident choreographer of the New Chamber Ballet and the Columbia Ballet Collaborative. She has also choreographed works for the Oregon Ballet Theater and the Colorado Ballet.

Her sister, Megan LeCrone, is a soloist for the New York City Ballet.
