= Steven Tanger Center for the Performing Arts =

- Interactive map of Steven Tanger Center for the Performing Arts
- Address: Greensboro, North Carolina; United States
- Coordinates: 36.0760873°N 79.7896652°W
- Capacity: 3,000
- Type: performing arts center

Construction
- Opened: September 2021

Website
- www.tangercenter.com

Steven Tanger Center for the Performing Arts in downtown Greensboro, North Carolina, is an $88 million 3,023-seat performing arts facility. Its first public performance was a September 2021 concert which was followed by an official opening in November 2021. It replaces the 2,400-seat War Memorial Auditorium in the Greensboro Coliseum Complex; the auditorium was torn down in October 2014. The Community Foundation of Greater Greensboro raised $35 million privately, to be paid over ten years. The city of Greensboro is paying $30 million. Construction was delayed a year so the foundation could get a $25 million bank loan to guarantee its contribution. The Greensboro Symphony and Guilford College's Bryan Series frequently use the facility. The facility will also hosts Broadway productions and concerts. The facility is named for Steven Tanger, CEO of Tanger Factory Outlet Centers, who pledged $7.5 million toward the project in 2013. After working for a year, a task force recommended a state of the art center in February 2013. Groundbreaking was held April 26, 2017, and the first work took place July 13.

== History ==
In 2000, Greensboro arts groups wanted a new performance facility or changes to existing facilities which were inadequate. War Memorial Auditorium, with 2,400 seats, was too large for some events but had a small stage and orchestra pit as well as poor acoustics; Coliseum Managing Director Matt Brown had plans for $5 million in improvements but no funding. The Carolina Theatre downtown had only 1,100 seats. A preliminary study recommended a performing arts center with 1,700 to 2,000 seats, and a smaller 500-seat facility. The study also said the city had enough events for both existing and new facilities. Arts leaders wanted a more detailed study.

A 2001 downtown master plan estimated the cost of a new performing arts center at between $35 and $45 million. A feasibility study was done in 2004.

2006 and 2008 bond referendums to renovate were unsuccessful. In 2008, Brown said events were being lost to the Durham Performing Arts Center and that Greensboro was entitled to a facility of equal quality. Until that happened, the auditorium could be repaired as needed, but that would not be enough.

In January 2012, Brown asked the city council to consider a $36 million performing arts center to replace the auditorium, paid for with $25 million in bonds and $11 million in accommodations tax revenues. A Greensboro Performing Arts Center Task Force began meeting in February. At their first meeting, Interim City Manager Denise Turner Roth said a downtown location, which the city council wanted, would cost up to $15 million more, with $10 million of that amount coming from donations.

In June 2012, the task force recommended a 3000-seat $60 million facility downtown.

In 2013, Greensboro attorney Kathy Manning agreed to serve as chair to seek private funds for the performing arts center.

Originally, the city-owned former YMCA site was to be used but it was not enough. Land was purchased at North Elm and Lindsay Streets and Summit Avenue at a cost of $11.5 million.

During the closing ceremony for War Memorial Auditorium on September 4, 2014, Brown showed what the planned veterans' memorial would look like. Names of veterans shown on plaques at the auditorium would eventually go in the new memorial near the Tanger Center.

Because the Tanger Center is expected to lose money in its early years, a new premium parking lot at the Coliseum Complex will be used to help with operating expenses. Expected revenue from the lot is nearly $400,000 a year. A second, 250-space lot at the Tanger Center is expected to provide $675,000 per year.

On July 29, 2015, the city revealed the cost of the center would be $58 million, $8 million over the original estimate, and not including $11.5 million for the land. This was after cuts had been made, and more cuts were expected.

On December 8, 2015, the city council approved a plan to raise $11 million more for the center, after it became clear the original budget was already exceeded by more than $10 million. The Chamber of Commerce building would be replaced by VIP parking expected to provide $1.6 million. Private donors would be asked for $3.5 million more. Ticket service fees would be $1 more, and $1 less of the existing $3 service fee would go to arts groups, with each raising a projected $3.75 million over 25 years. Also, $4.4 million of the costs would be eliminated if possible. The city would also have to authorize $9,617,858 in bonds.

At a January 27, 2016 news conference, H3 Hardy Collaboration Architecture showed designs for the exterior and lobby including a limestone and glass facade and lobby art to be paid for by donations.

On February 17, 2016, Phillips Foundation announced a $1.5 million grant; this is in addition to a $3.5 million grant in May 2013, for which the 8000-square-foot lobby will be named Phillips Hall. $500,000 of this amount went for art installation.

Brown and others announced on December 16, 2016 that the $38.5 million fund-raising goal had been met and that $300,000 of the additional $3 million had been raised. Construction was expected to start in May 2017 and will be complete in early 2020. The 111,000-square-foot building will face Abe Brenner Place and occupy part of a 5.5-acre lot also bordered by North Elm and East Lindsay Streets and Summit Avenue. The 3000 seats will be white oak with red upholstery, and divided into lower orchestra, upper orchestra and balcony. A Founders Room will be available for events. The site will also have 329 VIP parking spaces.

As of March 8, 2017, the opening date of early 2019 was uncertain. Potential donors had been saying for several months that delays would result in their waiting to give their money.

Steven Tanger and North Carolina Governor Roy Cooper attended the groundbreaking April 26, 2017. At the time, Brown predicted a June 2019 opening.

D.H. Griffin won the bidding for Phase I, which started July 13, 2017.

On December 19, 2017, the Greensboro city council awarded a $57.9 million contract to Barnhill Contracting Company of Raleigh, North Carolina. Work could start in January 2018, but this meant a completion date of January 2020. The project's total cost was $84.7 million, plus $5 million in financing costs. The Tanger Center would be collateral for $48 million in limited obligation bonds.

A web site was available and included what is described as a real-time camera permitting viewers to watch construction progress.

On March 13, 2020, it was announced that the center's opening would be put on hold due to statewide bans of gatherings consisting of more than 100 people due to the COVID-19 pandemic, effectively postponing or cancelling multiple opening events.

On December 1, 2020, the Greensboro Symphony Orchestra announced its first concert in the center would take place April 29, 2021. However, the first public performance at the center was a Rhiannon Giddens concert on September 2, 2021. The center's total cost was believed to be $88 million, not including financing costs. Tanger Center held an official opening ceremony November 15, 2021, that included the dedication of Genesis by Mabel Poblet, "nearly 200 strands of laser-cut, reflective metallic and clear acrylic discs ... from 6 inches to 24 inches in diameter" hanging from the ceiling of the lobby.

== Notable productions ==
Notable productions to play the Steven Tanger Center for the Performing Arts through the First Bank Broadway series include;

- Wicked (2021)
- The Lion King (2021)
- Dear Evan Hansen (2021)
- Mean Girls (2021)
- Come from Away (2021–2022)
- Hamilton (2022, 2024–2025)
- Jagged Little Pill (2022)
- Cats (2023)
- Ain't Too Proud (2023)
- Les Misérables (2023)
- The Book of Mormon (2023, 2025)
- Beetlejuice (2023)
- Frozen (2023)
- Chicago (2023)
- Aladdin (2023)
- My Fair Lady (2024)
- Six (2024)
- Moulin Rouge! (2024)
- Mamma Mia! (2024)
- & Juliet (2024)
- Elf (2024)
- MJ the Musical (2025)
- Back to the Future: The Musical (2025)
- Beauty and the Beast (2025)

The 2025–2026 Broadway season began in the fall of 2025.
