= Greensboro Cultural Center =

Coordinates: 36.0738°N 79.7885°W

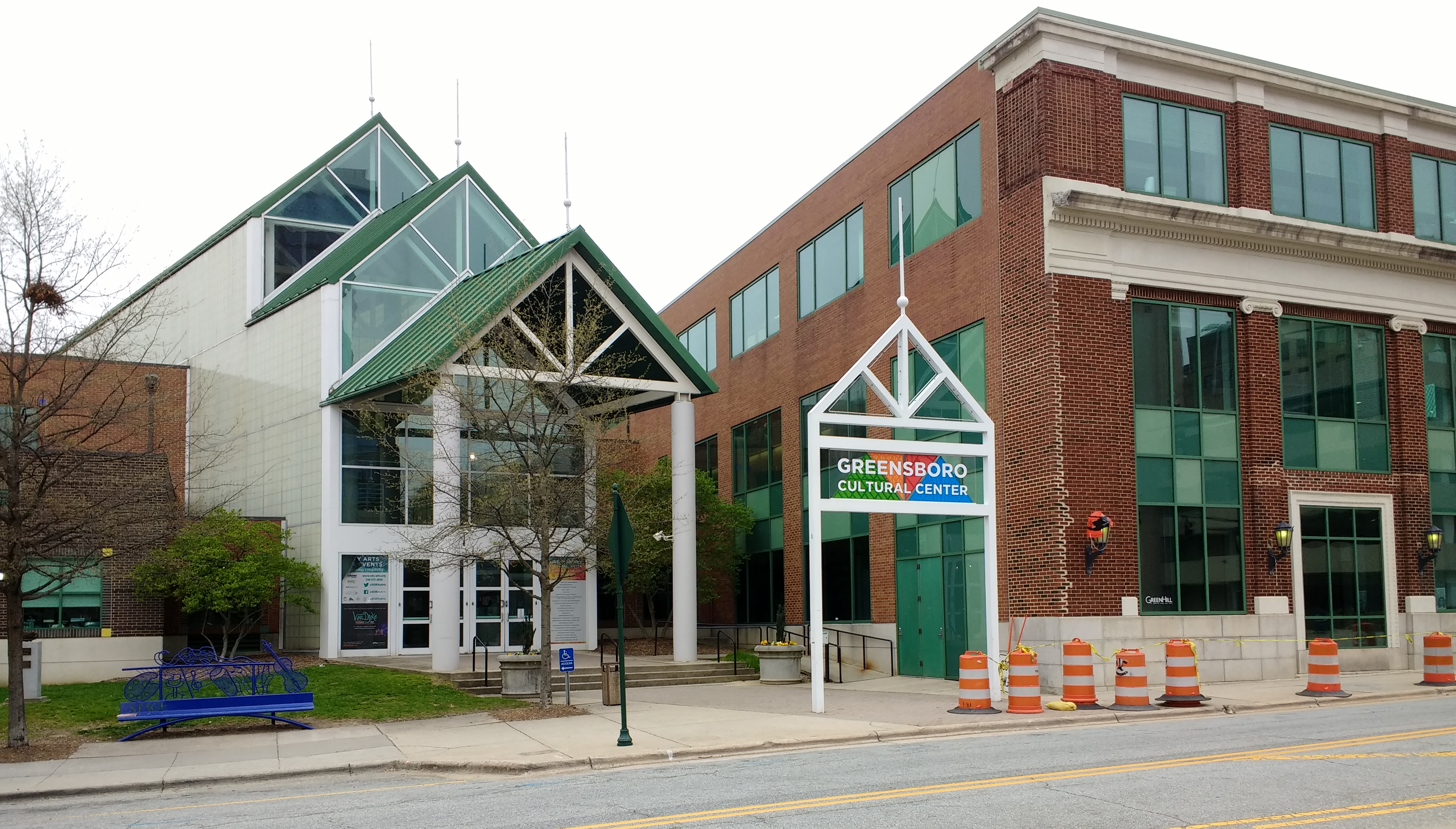
Greensboro Cultural Center

The Greensboro Cultural Center is a City of Greensboro Office of arts & culture facility, and is home to many arts-related programs in Greensboro, North Carolina.

== Facilities ==
The Cultural Center is a four-story building plus a basement and is located at 200 North Davie Street. It houses gallery and exhibition spaces, performance venues, and studio spaces, as well as a privately operated restaurant with outdoor cafe-style seating and an outdoor amphitheater.

== Tenants ==
Four contemporary visual art galleries are located within the Cultural Center. African American Atelier Inc., Center for Visual Artists, The Guilford Native American Art Gallery, and GreenHill Center for North Carolina Art each have public gallery space on the second floor. Art Alliance hosts art classes and manages a pottery studio on the first floor of the Cultural Center.

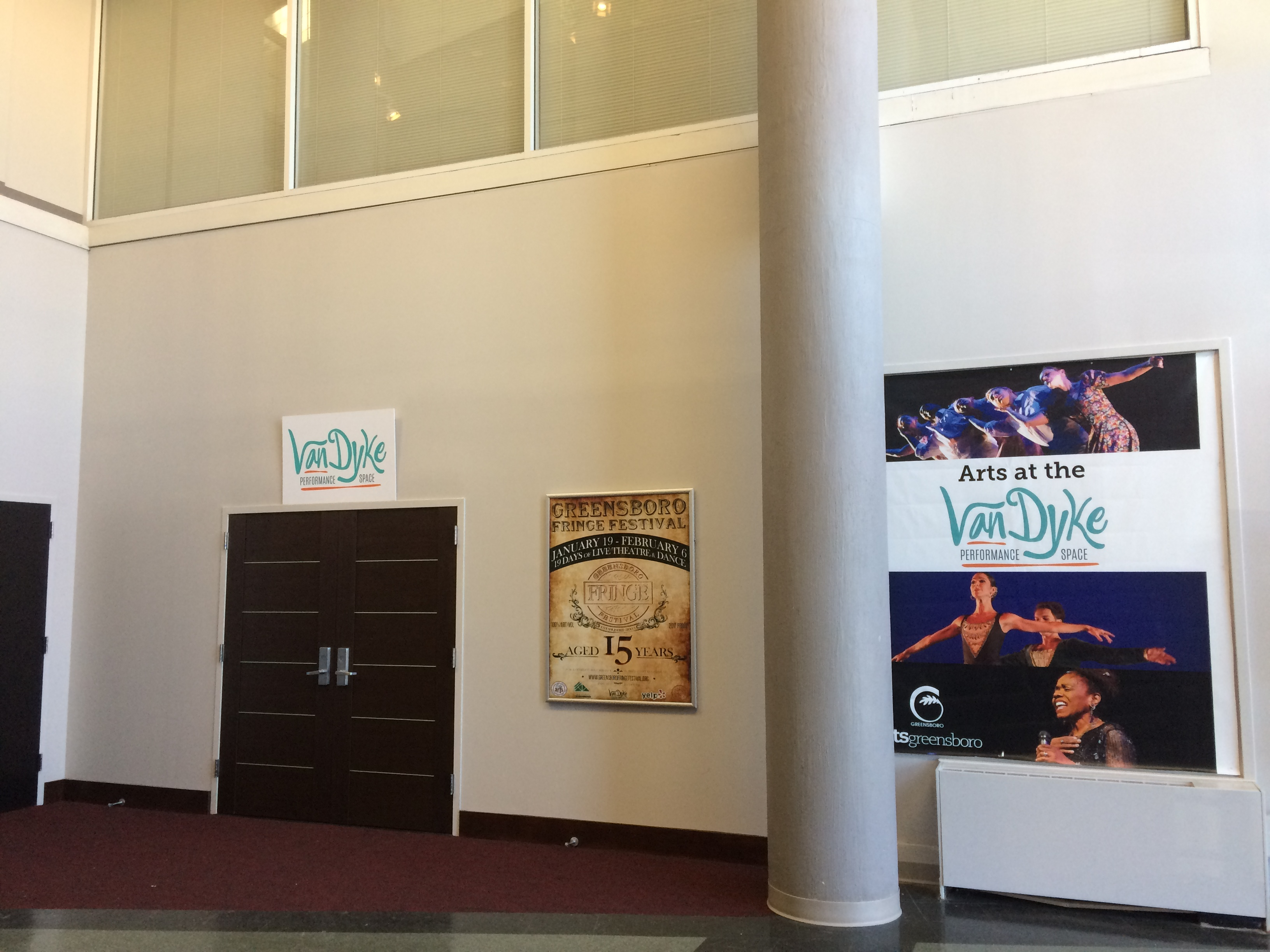
Van Dyke Performance Space

Music organizations including Bel Canto Company, Eastern Music Festival, Greensboro Opera, and the Greensboro Symphony are based out of the Cultural Center.

Performing arts organizations located in the Cultural Center include Community Theatre of Greensboro, Dance Project, Greensboro Ballet, and Triad Pride Performing Arts.

The Van Dyke Performance Space, named in honor of Jan Van Dyke, is located on the first floor of the Cultural Center. Greensboro Community Television, ArtsGreensboro, and City Arts are based out of the Cultural Center as well.

== Carolyn & Maurice LeBauer Park ==
Adjacent to the Greensboro Cultural Center is the 4-acre Carolyn & Maurice LeBauer Park. The park contains two cafes, a children's play ground, dog park, putt-putt green, ping-pong tables, and a fountain "splash pad," which is seasonally converted into an ice-skating rink. The park's stage and concert lawn hosts many outdoor gatherings, movie nights, and concerts. A public art installation by Janet Eschelman entitled "Where We Met" is prominently featured above the concert lawn.
