= Peter Paul Fuchs =

Austrian-American conductor and composer (1916–2007)

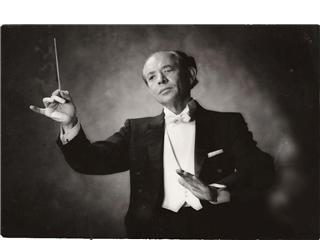
- Fuchs conducting
- Born: October 30, 1916; Vienna, Austria-Hungary
- Died: 26 March 2007 (aged 90); Greensboro, North Carolina, U.S.
- Education: Vienna Academy of Music
- Occupations: conductor composer
- Spouse(s): Anna Louise Granichstädten; Elissa Minet
- Children: 3
- Parents: Adolf Fuchs (father); Marianne Ruzicka (mother)

Peter Paul Fuchs (October 30, 1916 – March 26, 2007) was an Austrian-born conductor and composer, best known for his conducting appointments with American orchestras and for his teaching. He was also a prolific composer although little of his music survives in performance. His writings include two influential music text books.

== Early life ==
Fuchs was born on October 30, 1916, in Vienna, Austria-Hungary, son of Dr. Adolf Fuchs, a well known heart specialist, and Marianne Ruzicka, a piano teacher. His grandfather was Alois Ruzicka, a prominent Viennese lawyer, originally from the same hometown as Gustav Mahler, and who had encouraged Mahler's father to further young Gustav's musical studies. After his academic studies in the "gymnasium", he graduated in 1935 from the Vienna Academy of Music where his mentors were Felix Weingartner and Joseph Krips in conducting, and Karl Weigl in composition. In 1936 Fuchs was engaged as conductor and repetiteur for the German Theater in Brno, Czechoslovakia. The volatile politics of the period and the imminent Nazi invasion meant he was forced to leave Brno. Without a valid passport or job he spent two years living in exile in Switzerland and Italy until he received a US visa.

== Exile in America ==
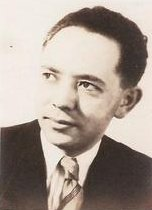
Peter Paul Fuchs

In 1938 he sailed for America with a letter of recommendation from Felix Weingartner, a tooth brush, $5.00, and a basic change of clothes. When he arrived in the US he supported himself by accompanying singers and instrumentalists, and playing for ballet classes. He toured with a small Ballet company in 1939-40 and in October 1940 he was hired as accompanist for the Ballet at the Metropolitan Opera. Fuchs arranged for his parents to leave Nazi occupied Austria in 1940, and brought them to America; two years later he was inducted into the army and automatically became an American citizen. Following the end of hostilities in 1945, he returned to the Metropolitan Opera as a full-time staff conductor until 1950 working with Bruno Walter, George Szell, Fritz Reiner, Erich Leinsdorf, Ettore Panizza, and others. He also conducted at the San Francisco Opera, the Cincinnati Opera, the Central City Opera, and the Tanglewood Music Festival where he was assistant conductor to Leonard Bernstein.

== Post-Met years ==
He left the Met in 1950 to become professor of music and opera at Louisiana State University, first as conductor and teacher, then as head of the opera department in 1952. His responsibilities grew later in the decade when he became the conductor of the Baton Rouge Symphony Orchestra, an appointment he held for the next 16 years, and also conductor of the Birmingham Opera in Alabama and of the Beaumont Opera in Beaumont, Texas. In Beaumont he was conductor and stage director for 13 years. He also developed an international career and guest conducted in the Netherlands, Greece, Germany, Romania, Portugal, and in his native Austria, appearing with such orchestras the Tonkünstler Orchestra, the Aachen, the North German Radio Symphony Orchestra, and the Romanian National Opera, Bucharest.

Louisiana State University awarded Peter Paul Fuchs an honorary Doctorate when he retired in 1976, and he then became Music Director and Conductor of the Greensboro Symphony Orchestra where he remained until 1988 and was also Artistic Director and Conductor of the Greensboro Opera Company from 1981 to 1992.

He died in Greensboro on March 26, 2007.

== Personal life ==
Peter and his first wife Anna Louise Fuchs (nee Granichstädten) have two sons, Roy Edward Fuchs and John Robert Fuchs. He was later remarried to the ballerina Elissa Minet Fuchs and they had a daughter, Deborah Porazzi.

== Writings ==
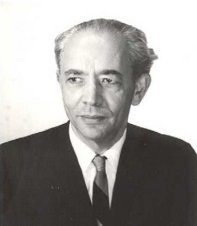
Peter Paul Fuchs

Fuchs translated several operas from several languages into English for American editors, notably Verdi's A Masked Ball for the Metropolitan Opera. His writing included two notable books, The Musical Theater of Walter Felsenstein (W. W. Norton) and The Psychology of Conducting (MCA), which has become required reading in many universities.

== Compositions ==
He had been composing chamber music, symphonies and opera since he was a teenager in Vienna. In Baton Rouge in the 1960s he conducted his opera "Serenade at Noon" at Louisiana State University. Then, in the late 80s and early 90s, excerpts from his opera "White Agony" were produced at the Komische Oper in Berlin (where Felsenstein had directed). In 1992, the Greensboro Opera produced a staged version of "White Agony" staged by his wife, Elissa Minet Fuchs, former ballerina of Ballet Russe de Monte-Carlo and the Metropolitan Opera. As well as his three operas (Serenade at Noon, The White Agony, and The Heretic), his other compositions include a symphony, a Concertino for Piano and Orchestra, Inventions for Wind Instruments, string quartets, a violin sonata, works for piano, and many songs. He directed many opera workshops notably at the Manhattan School of Music where, in 1962, he conducted the premier of Jan Meyerowitz's "Godfather Death". Both his daughter Debora Porazzi and son in law Arturo Porazzi work production roles on Broadway.

== Students ==
His conducting students included:

- Bill Conti, composer and conductor mostly active in Hollywood and television.
- Milton Crotts, former professor of music at Davidson College and the University of Guam and currently Music Director for the Blue Ridge Orchestra and Music Director for the Upper School at Carolina Day School.
- Janet Galván, professor of music and conductor at Ithaca College, New York.
- Adrian McDonnell, conductor of the Orchestre de la Cité Internationale in Paris and professor of conducting at the Conservatoire Frederic Chopin.

== Recordings ==
- Podcast of a private recording of Peter Paul Fuchs' Five Miniatures for chamber ensemble.

== Sources ==
1. Unpublished biographical notes by Elissa Minet Fuchs
