= Maryhelen Mayfield =

American ballet dancer and arts director

- Born: Maryhelen Hanson; January 28, 1946; Des Moines, Iowa, U.S.
- Died: November 22, 2024 (aged 78)
- Education: University of Missouri-Kansas City
- Occupations: Ballet dancer, arts administrator
- Spouse: John Dennis (m. 1993)
- Career
- Former groups: Kansas City Ballet

Maryhelen Mayfield (née Hanson; January 28, 1946 — November 22, 2024) was an American ballet dancer, choreographer, and artistic director. She was a dancer with Kansas City Ballet before moving to North Carolina to serve as both artistic and executive director of Greensboro Ballet. She served as the director of the ballet from 1980 until 2019, choreographing and staging over twenty-five original works.

== Biography ==
Mayfield grew up in Des Moines, Iowa. She began training in ballet when she was seven years old. She attended the Conservatory of Music and Dance at the University of Missouri–Kansas City before transferring to the National Ballet School of Washington. She left school to pursue a dance career in New York City after the National Ballet School fell under financial hardship. After an unsuccessful few years in New York, Mayfield returned to Des Moines and began working as a dance teacher and choreographer at a ballet school opened by one of her childhood ballet teachers. She taught at the school for two years before moving to Kansas City, Missouri where she earned a degree in ballet and joined the company at Kansas City Ballet as a member of the corps de ballet under the direction of Ron Sequoio. There, she trained under Russian ballet mistress Tatiana Dokoudovska. In 1980, she danced in James DeBolt's The House of the Rising Sun, Mystic Journey, choreographed by Ronald M. Sequoio. While dancing in the ballet, she also worked as an arts administrator for the city of Kansas City, Kansas, across the Missouri River.

In 1980 she moved from Kansas City to Greensboro, North Carolina to take up the role of artistic director and executive director of Greensboro Ballet, then a struggling ballet company known as Greensboro Civic Ballet Theatre, succeeding Elissa Minet Fuchs. Within her first month as a director, Mayfield choreographed a short ballet to premier as part of the ballet's inaugural season. With only $200 in funding in 1981, she staged the company's first The Nutcracker in a local church's recreation room, profiting $1,500. The following year, she moved the company's home performance space to the World War Memorial Stadium and, later, the Carolina Theatre of Greensboro.

Mayfield married John Dennis, a former ballet dancer with the Dallas Ballet, in 1993. They met when Dennis moved to Greensboro and began teaching at the ballet in 1986.

In 1986 Mayfield obtained an accreditation for Greensboro Ballet as a ballet school from the Southeast Regional Ballet Association. In 1995 she separated the ballet into two programs, a classical ballet school and a small professional company. In 1992 she was honored as an "outstanding North Carolina dance teacher" by the North Carolina School of the Arts. In February 1999 she debuted her original ballet, Doors, with Greensboro Ballet at the North Carolina School of the Arts. Maryfield also choreographed Mutcracker, a parody ballet based on The Nutckracker that incorporated dogs in the performance. Mayfield choreographed and staged over twenty-five original works for Greensboro Ballet.

In June 2002 Mayfield spoke out in opposition to the Greensboro Cultural Center requiring fees to non-profit arts organizations. In 2015 Mayfield graduated from the Guilford Nonprofit Consortium's Executive Director Academy. She was a recipient of the Betty Cone Medal of the Arts Award in 2007.

In November 2019 Mayfield and Dennis left Greensboro Ballet. Mayfield was succeeded by ballet mistress and company member Jessica Fry McAlister as artistic director and by Jennifer Savage Gentry as executive director. Company member Nina Bass Munda succeeded Dennis as school director. In January 2020 Mayfield and Dennis filed a lawsuit against Greensboro Ballet.
