= Thierry Blondeau =

French composer, born 1961

Thierry Blondeau (born 1961) is a French composer.

== Life ==
Born in Vincennes, Blondeau studied music and literature in Paris and Berlin (First Prize for musical composition at the Conservatoire de Paris and the Hochschule der Künste).

A resident at the Villa Medici in Rome from 1994 to 1996, laureate of the Villa Médicis hors les murs in 1998 at Basel, composer in residence at the E.N.M.D. of Brest from 1998 to 2000 then at the Akademie Schloss Solitude in 2000, he was composer in residence at Annecy from 2000 to 2002.

In 2002 and 2003, he was a guest composer in Berlin at the invitation of the German Academic Exchange Service.

Since 2003, he has been teaching at the Marc Bloch University of Strasbourg (acoustic and electroacoustic composition) and, in 2006, was invited by the Land of Lower Saxony to the Künstlerhof Schreyahn.

Blondeau's music can be seen as an audible construction of acoustic, spatial and instrumental conditions. The awareness of a lively sound leads him to integrate as much as possible the space of performance as an extended sound body of the instrument into the composition. This preoccupation led him, in addition to the concert pieces, to conceive sound actions in relation to a place, a space or a situation. Since 2000 he has been writing educational instrumental pieces with electroacoustics for all ages in collaboration with various music schools, with the aim of making contemporary music accessible to beginners.

His works are published by Éditions Jobert, Paris, and Dahlmann, Strasbourg.

== Selected works ==
- 1992: Ups and Downs, for 5 instruments
- 1993: Zigzag, for 14 instruments and electronics
- 1999: Pêle-Mêle, for 10 instruments and electronics
- 2002: Étude au Doppler, for 2 instruments and 2 Loudspeakers
- 2005: Lieu, for 10 instruments
- 2006: Appel, Écho, Envol, for 3 choirs, 4 solo flutes and orchestra
- 2011: String Quartet No. 1
