= Elissa Minet Fuchs =

American ballerina (1919–2023)

- Born: Elise Minette Levy; March 10, 1919; New Orleans, Louisiana, U.S.
- Died: February 17, 2023 (aged 103); Greensboro, North Carolina, U.S.
- Occupations: Ballet dancer; ballet mistress; radio actress; choreographer
- Years active: 1935–2000
- Spouse: Peter Paul Fuchs
- Children: 1
- Career
- Former groups: Ballet Russe de Monte-Carlo (1937); Metropolitan Opera Ballet (1938–1950)

Elissa Minet Fuchs (born Elise Minette Levy; March 10, 1919 – February 17, 2023) was an American ballerina and choreographer. Her career started in 1935 on the vaudeville stage and nightclub circuit, leading to gigs as a chorus girl on Broadway. With the fear of rising antisemitism around the world, she changed her name to appear French and conceal her Jewish identity. In 1937, she joined the Ballet Russe de Monte-Carlo and danced with the company for one season. From 1938 to 1950, she danced with the resident ballet company at the Metropolitan Opera, retiring as a soloist. Fuchs founded and directed the Baton Rouge Ballet Theatre in Louisiana and worked as the artistic director, ballet mistress, and choreographer at Greensboro Ballet in North Carolina.

== Early life ==
Fuchs was born Elise Minette Levy to a Jewish American family on March 10, 1919, in New Orleans. Her father, Arthur Levy, was a businessman who sold light fixtures and her mother, Rose Levy, was an artist. Fuchs' older sister had been an actress before leaving the stage to get married.

She began dance lessons when she was three years old and, at the age of seven, began studying classical ballet. In September 1935, as she was getting ready to finish high school in New Orleans, she and her mother heard about professional dance opportunities in Chicago. Her father initially objected but, with the support of her mother, sister, and the family rabbi, she was permitted to travel to Chicago to seek work as a dancer.

== Career ==
=== Life as a ballerina and theatre performer ===
Upon arriving in Chicago with her mother, Fuchs changed her name from Elise Minette Levy to Elissa Minet and decided to lie about her age, saying she was eighteen instead of sixteen. Her name change was to conceal her Jewish identity and appear French, as it was still risky for Jews to perform in public and a French identity appealed to the ballet world. Fuchs went to auditions with a friend and fellow dancer, Alda Marova. After four days of auditioning, she tried out for a vaudeville show produced by Mike Todd called Bring on the Dames, receiving a call back from dance director Fred Evans. Fuchs was hired for the show and toured for eight months. Her mother stayed with her for the first six years of her career, and was hired by Todd as a seamstress and wardrobe assistant.

In 1937, she worked on another of Todd's vaudeville shows in New York, but the show later folded. Afterwards, she went on to perform in various vaudeville shows and at nightclubs and supper clubs in Chicago and New York City, and performed as a chorus girl in multiple Broadway productions and on the Borscht Belt. Fuchs decided to go back to ballet and, in 1937, she joined the Russian-based touring ballet company Ballet Russe de Monte-Carlo, dancing with them for six months. After leaving the Ballet Russe, she worked at Bond International Casino in the city.

In 1938, she was offered a Can-can audition at the Moulin Rouge in Paris, but her father refused to allow it due to the rise in Antisemitism in Europe and Adolf Hitler's rise to power in neighboring Germany. Fuchs stayed in the United States and won a series of auditions for the Metropolitan Opera's resident ballet company, beating out 500 other dancers including Nora Kaye and Alicia Alonso. She danced with the company until 1950, starting as a member of the corps de ballet and retiring as a soloist. At the Metropolitan Opera Ballet, she danced as Cleopatra in Faust, One of the Three Graces in Tannhäuser, High Priestess in Aida, and as a gypsy in Carmen. During this time, she took ballet classes with George Balanchine.

Fuchs danced her last professional role in March 2000 as Carabosse in Greensboro Ballet's production of Pyotr Ilyich Tchaikovsky's The Sleeping Beauty.

=== Radio actress, choreographer, and ballet teacher ===
In the 1940s, Fuchs worked as a radio actress, working on radio soap operas. She joined Victory Troupe, an acting group, and worked with Milton Berle, Martha Raye, Victor Mature, Carol Landis, Walter O'Keefe, and Katie Smith.

Fuchs moved back to Louisiana in 1950 with her husband, who was employed as the opera director at Louisiana State University and as conductor of the Baton Rouge Symphony. While living in Baton Rouge, she founded the Baton Rouge Ballet Theatre, a ballet company and affiliate ballet school. Fuchs also worked as the ballet mistress and choreographer for the New Orleans Opera and other performing arts companies in Jackson, Mississippi and Mobile, Alabama.

After twenty-six years of teaching in Baton Rouge, she and her husband moved to Greensboro, North Carolina in 1976, where her husband succeeded Sheldon Morgenstern as the director of the Greensboro Symphony Orchestra. Fuchs worked at various dance projects upon moving to North Carolina, including choreographing the first annual Greensboro Symphony Guild Debutante Ball and choreographing and working as a production manager for the Greensboro Opera. As a choreographer, she choreographed for the Greensboro Opera's The Masked Ball. She also acted in community theatre productions. Fuchs then became involved with Civic Ballet Theatre, later known as Greensboro Ballet, and ran the company as artistic director for one year. Upon stepping down as artistic director, she joined the ballet's board of directors and helped hire Maryhelen Mayfield, a former dancer with Kansas City Ballet, to take over the company. Mayfield hired Fuchs to teach ballet and serve as ballet mistress at Greensboro Ballet. In 1981, she and Mayfield hosted a fashion show fundraiser with a Nutcracker theme. Despite competition with the nearby North Carolina School of the Arts in Winston-Salem producing their own The Nutcracker, Mayfield and Fuchs produced and choreographed the same ballet, which become Greensboro Ballet's highest grossing annual show. In later years, she taught adult ballet classes at the School of Greensboro Ballet and assisted with productions for the company.

From 2001 to 2002, she produced a revue titled My Life and Dance in 20th Century which detailed her life and career spanning through major world events including the Great Depression, The Holocaust, World War II, the Civil rights movement, Reaganomics, and the Moon landing of Apollo 11. The show featured company dancers with the Greensboro Ballet.

In the fall of 2019, Fuchs was the first recipient of the Maryhelen Mayfield Etoile Award. She was also a recipient of the Betty Cone Medal of Arts & Art Teacher of Year Award.

== Personal life and death ==
In 1949, she married the Austrian composer Peter Paul Fuchs. Her husband, a refugee who fled Nazi-controlled Austria, was the conductor of the Greensboro Symphony. The two had met at the Metropolitan Opera House in 1940. They had one daughter, Debora.

Due to her husband's Alzheimer's, the couple moved into Friends Homes, a retirement and assisted living community in Greensboro that is run by the Society of Friends. Her husband died in 2007.

Fuchs had a cochlear implant to assist with her hearing loss.

She died on February 17, 2023, at the age of 103.

== Legacy ==
The Baton Rouge Ballet Theatre named a scholarship fund after Fuchs.
