= Carolina Theatre of Greensboro =

Coordinates: 36.0697°N 79.7918°W

The Carolina Theatre of Greensboro
- The Showplace of the Carolinas
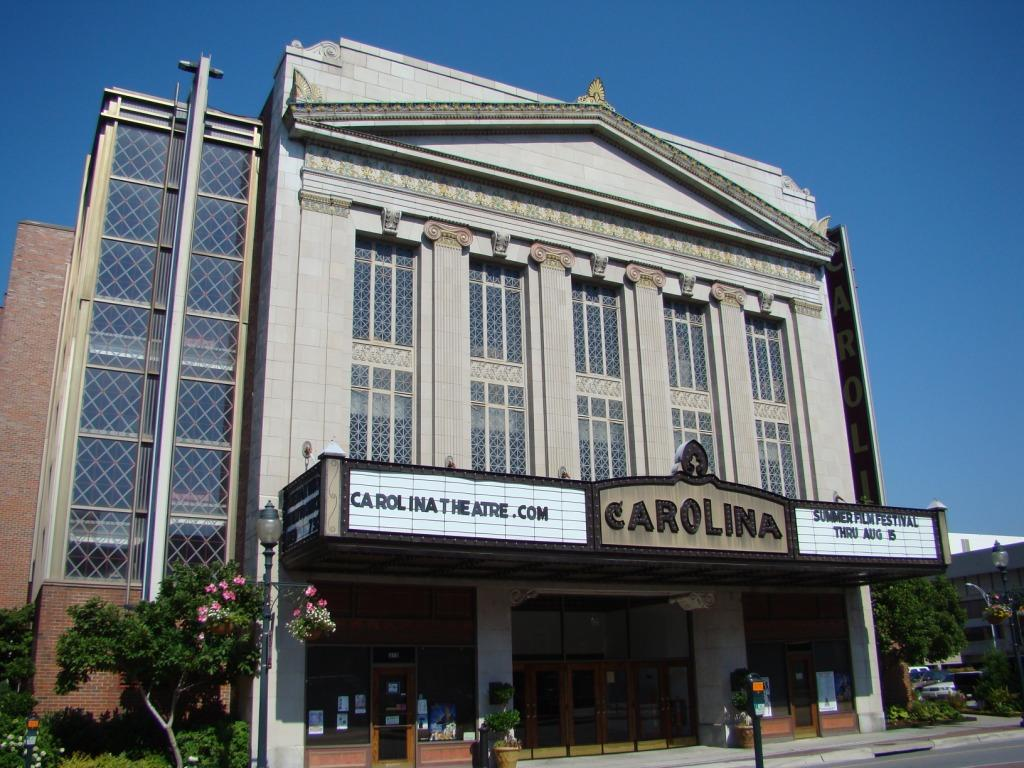
- The Carolina Theatre in daylight
- Interactive map of The Carolina Theatre of Greensboro
- Address: 310 South Greene Street
- Location: Greensboro, North Carolina, US
- Owner: Carolina Theatre of Greensboro, Inc.
- Capacity: 1,101
- Type: Performing-arts center

Construction
- Built: 1920s
- Opened: October 31, 1927
- Renovated: 1978, 1990, 2018

Website
- carolinatheatre.com

The Carolina Theatre of Greensboro is Greensboro, North Carolina's only remaining historic theatre. It was billed as “The Showplace of the Carolinas” when it opened on Halloween night, 1927. The 2,200 seat structure was built for the Saenger-Publix Company, cost over $500,000 to build and was one of the first commercial buildings to be air conditioned in the state.

Early programs featured live performances, the Carolina Theatre Orchestra, the Carolina News newsreel, audience sing-alongs and silent films accompanied on the Robert Morton theatre organ. Saenger installed a Vitaphone sound system in 1928. The first "talkies" attracted sellout crowds. The first movie with sound shown at the Carolina was Glorious Betsy starring Conrad Nagel in 1928. The Jazz Singer was shown next.

When constructed, the auditorium had a segregated balcony plus a mezzanine. Black patrons entered by a separate stairway and could only sit in the balcony. As late as May, 1963, the theatre was segregated. On May 15, 1963, students from North Carolina A&T University and Bennett College blocked the theatre's entrance when they were refused entrance.

By the early 1970s, the theatre had declined and was slated for demolition by its owner, Jefferson Pilot Corporation, now Lincoln National Corporation. The United Arts Council of Greensboro raised $550,000 to purchase the building from Jefferson Pilot at a bargain price. The United Arts Council refurbished the Theatre before reopening it as a community arts performing arts center in 1978.

In 1981, a mentally disturbed woman started a fire at the theatre and necessitated a second refurbishment. The balcony was closed and later new lighting and sound systems installed. In its present configuration, the theatre seats 1,101.

Today, the Carolina Theatre is owned and operated by Carolina Theatre of Greensboro, Incorporated – a 501(c)3 nonprofit corporation. Allie Arpajian is currently Executive Director of the corporation.

The theatre is home to the Greensboro Ballet. Community Theatre of Greensboro mounts its annual production of The Wizard of Oz every November at The Carolina.

With the exception of several public grants for restoration and maintenance, the Theatre operates on its own receipts and private contributions. Current programming includes classic and artistic movies, touring performers and companies, local theatre and dance productions, and other nonprofit and corporate uses.

CTOG, Inc. is a member of the League of Historic American Theatres and North Carolina Presenters Consortium.

A renovation campaign to raise $2.5 million was announced September 14, 2017, with renovations complete in October 2018.
