= The Rawk =

Boulder in Greensboro, North Carolina

- The Rawk in 2005, featuring information about an Alpha Chi Omega interest meeting
- Completion date: 1973
- Medium: Graffiti
- Location: Greensboro, North Carolina
- Owner: University of North Carolina at Greensboro

The Rawk, also known as The Rock, is a 12.7-ton graffiti boulder on the campus of the University of North Carolina at Greensboro. It was donated to the university by the Phi Kappa chapter of Alpha Phi Omega in 1973.

== History ==
The Rawk is a 12.7-ton boulder sourced from a quarry in Jamestown, North Carolina. The Phi Kappa chapter of Alpha Phi Omega purchased the boulder for $31.78 from Lambeth Construction Company and donated to the University of North Carolina at Greensboro in 1973. The fraternity donated it to the university in order to dissuade students from vandalizing the statue of university president Charles Duncan McIver.

The boulder has been referred to as both "the Rock" and "the Rawk", with a 1983 Pine Needles publication referring to it as the former and an August 17, 1973 publication of The Carolinian referring to it as the latter.

The Rawk is used as a student advertising and communication forum, where any university student group can graffiti the boulder with information about upcoming events. Messages are left up for at least 24 hours. In the 1980s, messages on the Rawk included celebrating the end of the Iranian Hostage Crisis. In 2020, Black Lives Matter messages were painted on it. In 2005, The Carolinian staff writer Luke McIntyre wrote an article titled Housing shortage forces students to live on Rawk.

The university's "Rawkin' Welcome Week", to welcome incoming freshman, takes its name from the boulder.

It was originally placed on between the Quad and the Dining Hall before being moved near to Gray Street, near the clocktower and between the Dining Hall and the Walter Clinton Jackson Library, in 1987. In August 2026, the Rawk was moved to a new location, less than 100 feet from where it stood, at the top of the hill near Moran Commons and Plaza. A construction crew moved it with a crane in order to make way for landscaping renovations.
