= Orlo Epps =

American architect

- Born: 1864; Elkhart, Indiana
- Died: June 2, 1926 (aged 61–62); Oneonta, New York
- Occupation: Architect
- Known for: Architect, socialist
- Notable work: Julius I. Foust Building, Orlo Epps House

Orlo Epps (1864 – June 2, 1926) was an American architect, mathematician, physicist, and socialist writer.

== Life ==
Epps was born in Elkhart, Indiana, the son of Edward Epps and Helen (Blanchard) Epps. He moved to Oneonta, New York at age 16. He graduated from high school in Oneonta and thereafter studied architecture at Cornell University, graduating in 1888. After receiving his degree from Cornell, Epps associated with builder Lyman H. Blend and practiced as an architect in Oneonta. He moved to Greensboro, North Carolina in approximately 1890 and became known as "one of Greensboro's principal architects around the turn of the 20th century. Epps was also a professor of mathematics and physics at the Agricultural and Mechanical College at Greensboro.

Epps returned to Oneonta in 1905. He operated a hardware business under the name Epps & Kerr from 1905 until 1908. After the "Wooden Row fire of 1908," Epps returned to the practice of architecture, assisting Lyman Blend in designing a row of brick structures to replace the ones destroyed in the fire. He opened an architectural office in Oneonta in 1911, which he continued until his death. He was also a member of the Fortnightly Club and a Royal Arch High Priest in the Masons.

At the time of the 1910 United States census, Epps was living in Oneonta with his wife Charlotte and his mother Helen. His occupation was listed as an architect with his own office. At the time of the 1915 New York Census, Epps was living in Oneonta with his wife Charlotte, mother Helen and five-year-old son Max. At the time of the 1920 U.S. census, he was living in Oneonta with his wife Charlotte and son Max. Epps died in Oneonta in June 1926 at age 61.

== Views ==
Epps was also outspoken on political and economic matters. He was known as "a Socialist in a day when a member of that political party was held in suspicion by the average citizen." In 1903, Epps also published a book on economic theory through The Epps Publishing Co. of Oneonta. The book was titled Economic Liberty vs. The Warfare of Wealth. Epps also became a leader of the local Socialist Party in Oneonta, and he advocated for women's suffrage, direct election of senators, and the referendum and recall.

== Architectural works ==
Among Epps' designs are the following:

- Julius I. Foust Building, also known as the Main Building at the State Normal and Industrial School for White Girls (later renamed University of North Carolina at Greensboro), 1000 W. Spring Garden St., Greensboro, North Carolina (Epps & Hackett), NRHP-listed
- Orlo Epps House, 808 Walker Avenue, College Hill, Greensboro, North Carolina, and possibly other works in College Hill Historic District, roughly bounded by W. Market St., S. Cedar St., Oakland Ave. and McIver St., Greensboro, North Carolina (Epps, Orlo), NRHP-listed
- F.H. Bresee building, Oneonta, New York
- Brick Dormitory (1891), University of North Carolina at Greensboro, Greensboro, North Carolina (Orlo Epps with C. M. Hackett), no longer standing
- Cone Export Commission Company Office Building (1902), 111 W. Washington St., Greensboro, North Carolina
- Elks Club, Oneonta lodge
- Flat Top Manor (1899–1901), also known as Cone Estate, Moses H. Cone Memorial Park, Blue Ridge Parkway milepost 294, Watauga County, North Carolina
- Fox Hospital Nurses' home (1910), Oneonta, New York
- Hobart Presbyterian Church (1914), Hobart, New York
- Morris Brothers, Elmore and West-Nesbitt feed mills and grain elevators
- Old State School at Delhi, New York
- Parshall Hospital addition (1922), Oneonta, New York
- Tallulah A. Richardson House, 312 S. Main St., Reidsville, North Carolina

Some of his buildings are listed on the National Register of Historic Places.
