= Julius Isaac Foust =

- Foust pictured in the 1921 Pine Needles yearbook

President of the University of North Carolina at Greensboro
- In office 1906–1934
- Preceded by: Charles Duncan McIver
- Succeeded by: Walter Clinton Jackson

Personal details
- Born: November 23, 1865 Alamance County, North Carolina
- Died: February 15, 1946 (aged 80) Lakeland, Florida

Julius Isaac Foust (1865–1946) was the second president of the school now known as The University of North Carolina at Greensboro, serving from 1906 until his retirement in 1934.

Foust was a native of Alamance County, North Carolina and an 1890 graduate of the University of North Carolina at Chapel Hill with a degree in philosophy. He served as a teacher, principal, and superintendent of schools in Wilson, North Carolina and Goldsboro, North Carolina. In 1902, he arrived at State Normal and Industrial School (now UNCG) as a professor of education. Upon the death of founding president Charles Duncan McIver in September 1906, Foust was named interim president of the school. In 1907, he was officially named the second president of State Normal. Under Foust's leadership, the school grew from a total student body of 461 in 1907 to 1,761 in 1931. By 1931, it was the third largest college for women in the country. The physical plant also grew during his presidency. Between 1906 and 1934, the campus added eleven residence halls, three dining halls, a gymnasium, music building, auditorium, classroom building, infirmary, and more. Upon retirement, Foust was made president emeritus of the college. He died at his winter home in Lakeland, Florida, on February 15, 1946. He was buried in Green Hill Cemetery in Greensboro, North Carolina. On February 22, 1960, the main administrative building on campus was renamed the Julius I. Foust Building in honor of Foust's contributions to the campus. The Julius Foust Elementary School in Greensboro is also named in his memory.
