= Frances Webb Bumpass =

Publisher and educator (1819–1898)

Frances Bumpass
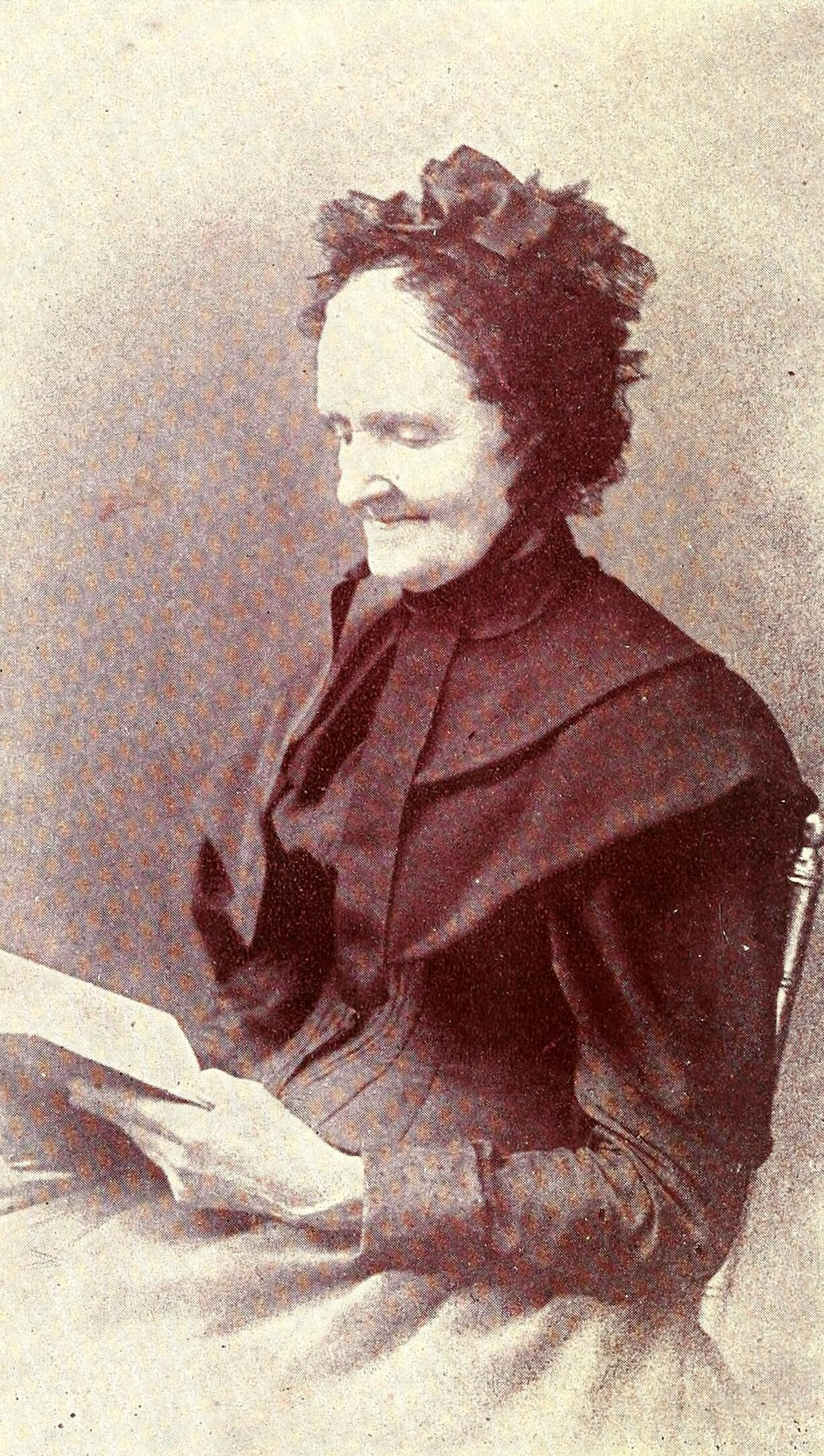
- Frances Bumpass
- Born: Frances Moore Webb; September 29, 1819; Halifax, Virginia
- Died: May 8, 1898 (aged 78)

Frances Moore Webb Bumpass (September 29, 1819 – May 8, 1898; sometimes written as Bumpas), was a newspaper publisher and educator in North Carolina. She published the Weekly Message for twenty years, including through most of the American Civil War, and helped organize the Women's Foreign Mission Society of the Methodist Church.

== Early life ==
Frances Moore Webb was born in Halifax, Virginia, and raised in Person County, North Carolina, the daughter of Isaac Webb and Harriet Dickens Webb. She was part of the extended Webb family in Person County that included educator William R. Webb. She studied to be a teacher by learning Latin and Greek as a young woman.

== Career ==
As a young clergyman's wife, she moved often, and taught as possible to supplement the family income. In 1847 she settled more permanently in Greensboro, North Carolina. In 1852, the widowed Mrs. Bumpass took over publishing the Weekly Message, a newspaper her husband had begun. She remained the publisher of the Weekly Message for twenty years, and published regularly through the Civil War years, except during a period of Federal occupation in 1865. Her elder daughter Eugenia Harriet Bumpass helped with the paper, and taught at Greensboro Female College.

In 1872, she closed the Weekly Message and started a small school in her home. She helped to organize and promote the Women's Foreign Mission Society of the Methodist Church in her last years. She exhorted women in the church to action, saying "Sisters, we have tarried too long. Each of us owes it to herself, in this favored age, to rise to the noblest possibilities of our nation."

== Personal life ==
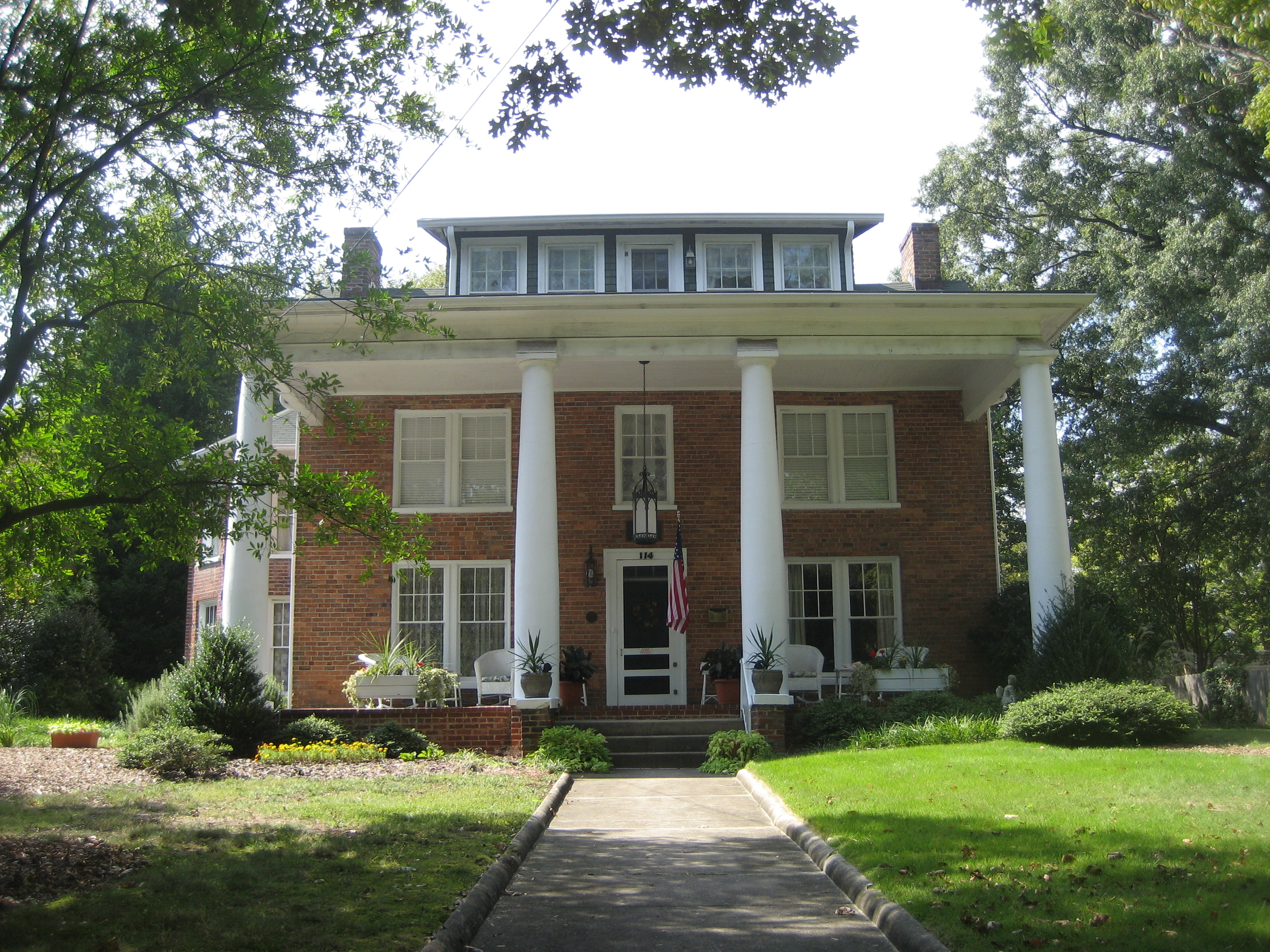
Bumpas-Troy House in Greensboro, North Carolina

Frances Webb married Methodist minister Sidney D. Bumpass (or Bumpas) in 1842, when she was 23. They had four children, daughters Duella and Eugenia Harriet, and sons Robah (who became a Methodist minister like his father) and Terrelius (who died in childhood, during the same attack of typhoid fever as his father). She was widowed in 1851. She died in 1898, and the following year her autobiography was published by the Southern Methodist Church.

Her papers are part of the Bumpas Family Papers at the Southern Historical Collection, University of North Carolina, Chapel Hill.

The Bumpas-Troy House in College Hill, Greensboro, North Carolina, built in 1847 for Frances and Sidney Bumpass and the site of the publishing office of the Weekly Message, is now an inn on the National Register of Historic Places.
