= College Hill, Greensboro, North Carolina =

Historic district in North Carolina, United States

- College Hill Historic District
- U.S. National Register of Historic Places
- U.S. Historic district
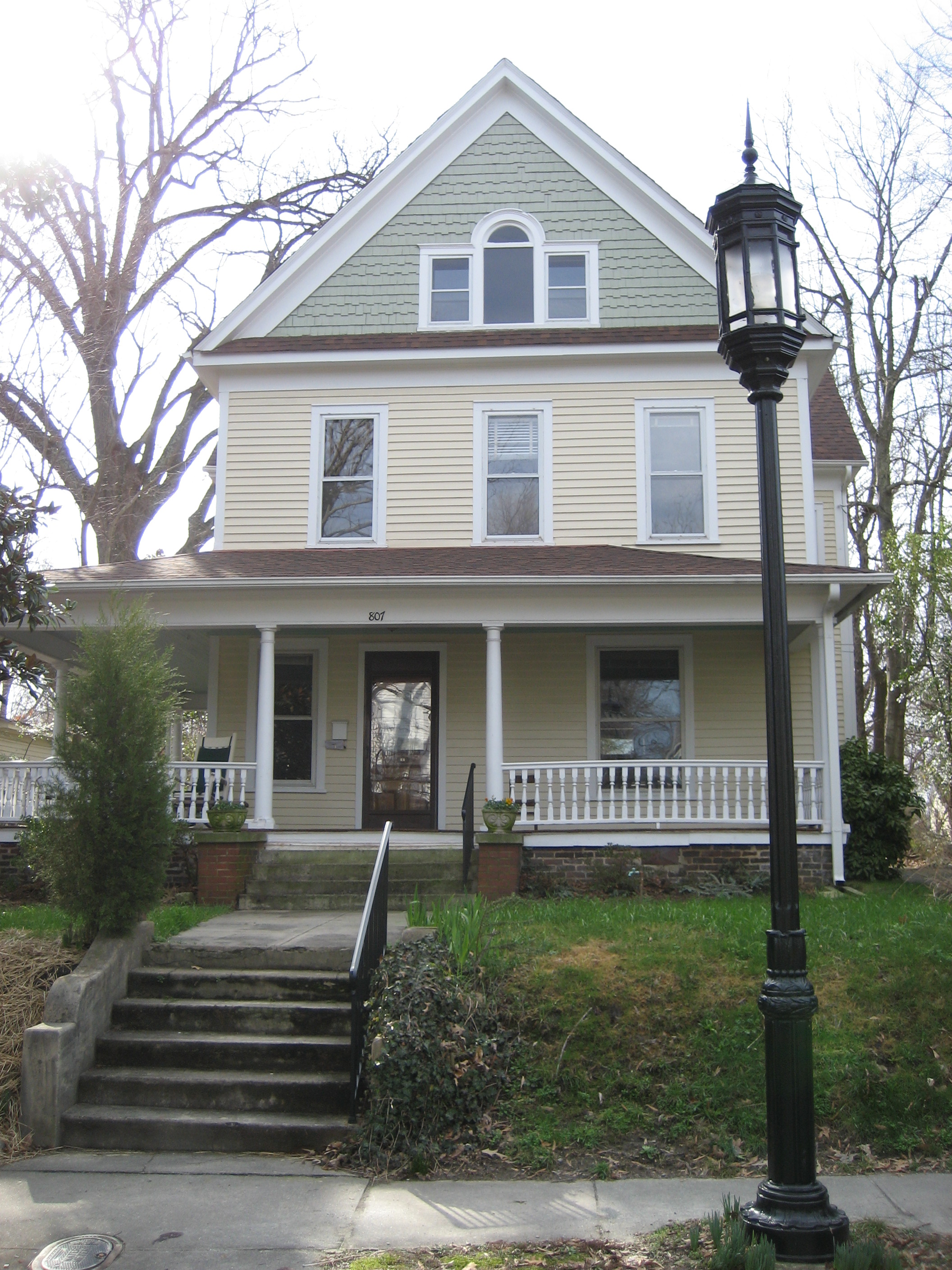
- Typical nineteenth-century residence in College Hill

- Location within North Carolina Location within the United States
- Location: Roughly bounded by W. Market St., S. Cedar St., Oakland Ave. and McIver St., Greensboro, North Carolina
- Coordinates: 35°57′20″N 80°0′41″W
- Area: 72 acres (29 ha)
- Built: 1837
- Architect: Epps, Orlo; Barton, Harry
- Architectural style: Bungalow/craftsman, Queen Anne, Colonial Revival
- MPS: Greensboro MPS
- NRHP reference No.: 93001191
- Added to NRHP: November 4, 1993

College Hill is a neighborhood in the west central section of the United States city of Greensboro, North Carolina. College Hill was Greensboro's first neighborhood.

== Geography ==
=== Boundaries ===
The College Hill neighborhood is bounded:

- on the north by West Market Street;
- on the west by McIver and Tate streets;
- on the south by the Southern Railway tracks, and
- on the east by Freeman Mill Road, Spring Street, West McGee Street and Greensboro College.

The College Hill Historic District is a smaller area in the neighborhood. The National Register of Historic Places district has slightly different boundaries. As a result, two of the neighborhood's most historic structures, Wafco Mill and the Greensboro College administration building, are within the city's historic district but outside the National Register District. Both are listed on the Historic Register separately.

=== ZIP code ===
The 27403 ZIP code includes College Hill and other neighborhoods, including Glenwood, Lindley Park and Sunset Hills.

== History ==
This broad hilltop just west of downtown Greensboro was settled in the 1840s and 50s by individuals associated with nearby Greensboro College. Their strong Methodist affiliation earned the hill its nineteenth century nickname “Piety Hill,” and several commodious homes from the period remain including the Bumpass-Troy House (now Troy-Bumpas) and Boxwood.

The hill and its convenient location proved a popular choice for Greensboro Victorian era middle class who wished to escape the hustle and bustle of the growing village. Renamed “College Hill” after the establishment of the University of North Carolina at Greensboro in 1891, a number of elaborate Queen Anne-style houses were built along Walker Avenue, Mendenhall Street, and Morehead Avenue in the 1890s. The Orlo Epps House (private) of 1890 was designed by Orlo Epps, architect of UNCG's Julius I. Foust Hall, with elaborate details such as turned porch posts, shingle siding and colorful paint scheme.

Development was not limited to residences. Greensboro's oldest fire house stands at 547 South Mendenhall Street. The two-story brick building served as the West End Hose Company from 1897 to 1919, when it was replaced with a new building one block north at 442 South Mendenhall. Both buildings have been adaptively reused, the first as a general store, the second as a private residence. The Wafco Mill complex began as a grist mill in 1893, with subsequent additions through 1912. The complex was restored in 1983 as condominiums.

Two small commercial areas are located in College Hill. The intersection of Tate Street and Walker Avenue features numerous restaurants, two coffee houses, and stores that cater to the nearby university. The intersection of Mendenhall and Spring Garden streets has a smaller collection of stores that serve the student population. The students and growing nearby campuses that give the neighborhood its energy also create special problems. Parking has been an issue in the narrow streets for decades, and student housing sometimes challenges city health codes.

== Parks and public spaces ==
- Peabody Park (on UNCG campus)
- Springdale Park

== Notable architects and builders ==
- Harry Barton
- Orlo Epps
- Frank A. Weston

== College Hill Neighborhood Association ==
The College Hill Residents Association was incorporated as a 501(c)3 non-profit corporation in July 1978. In December that year, the name was changed to the College Hill Neighborhood Association.

Membership is open to all neighborhood residents and to all property owners.

== Other notable civic institutions ==
- College Place United Methodist Church
- Greensboro College
- Greensboro Primitive Baptist Church
- Presbyterian Church of the Covenant
- The University of North Carolina at Greensboro (UNCG)

== On the National Register of Historic Places ==
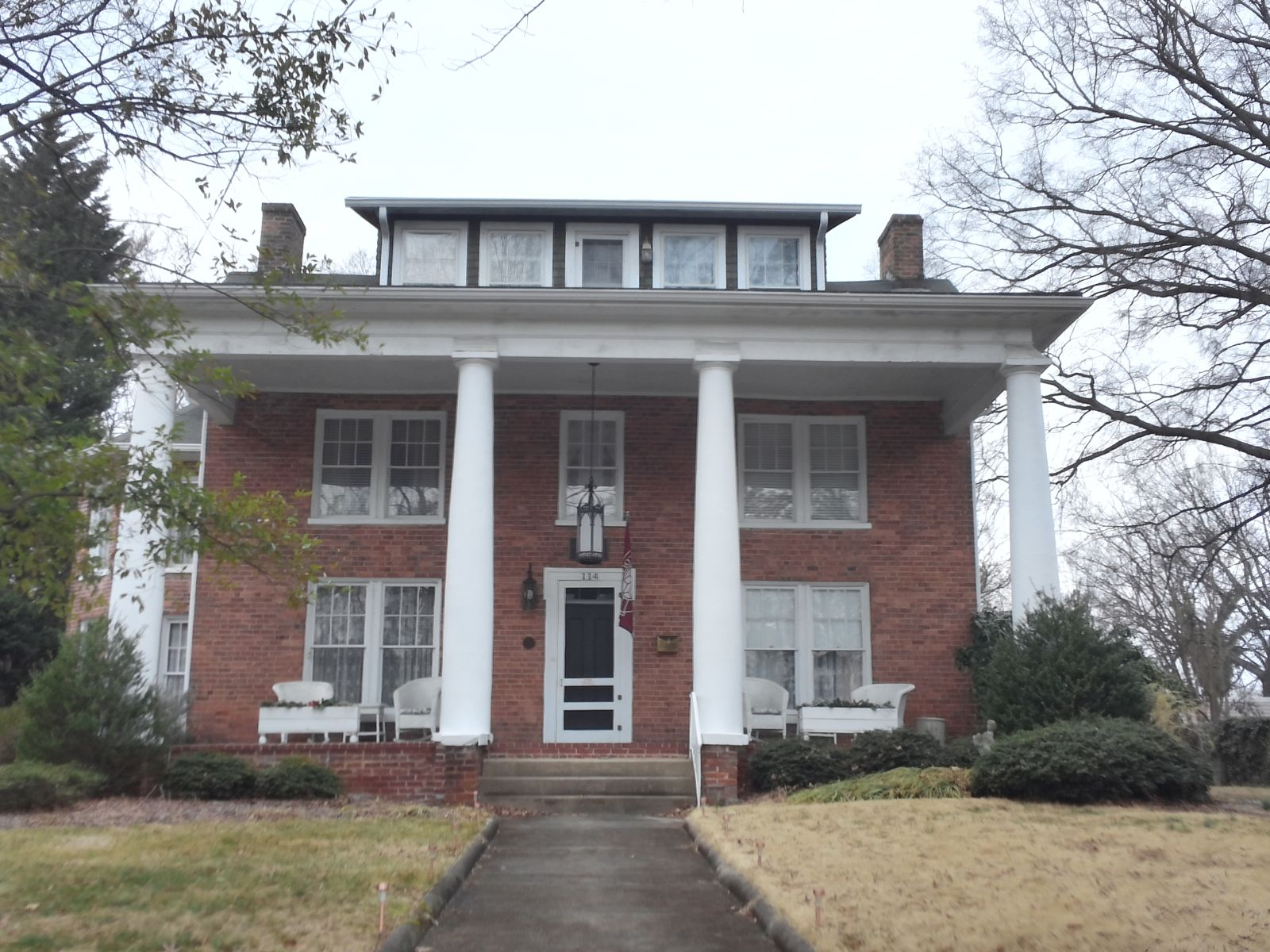
Bumpas-Troy House, 2015

The College Hill Historic District encompasses 320 contributing buildings and 1 contributing site in a predominantly residential section of Greensboro. The houses were largely built between the 1890s and 1930s and include notable examples of Queen Anne, Colonial Revival, and Bungalow / American Craftsman-style architecture. The earliest house, the Walker-Scarborough House, was built about 1845, and is thought to have been built by Gov. John Motley Morehead for his daughter, Letitia upon her marriage to Stephen Walker. Located in the district is the separately listed Bumpas-Troy House (1847). Other notable buildings are the Orlo Epps House, Ward-Foust House, Ward-Gaston House, Robert P. Gorrell House, Robert C. Strudwick House (1912), Winburn Court Apartments (1929), West End Hose Company Firehouse, former Spring Garden Street (now College Place) Methodist Church, and Presbyterian Church of the Covenant (1919, 1937).

It was listed on the National Register of Historic Places in 1993.
