= Bumpas-Troy House =

Historic house in North Carolina, United States

- U.S. National Register of Historic Places
- U.S. Historic district – Contributing property
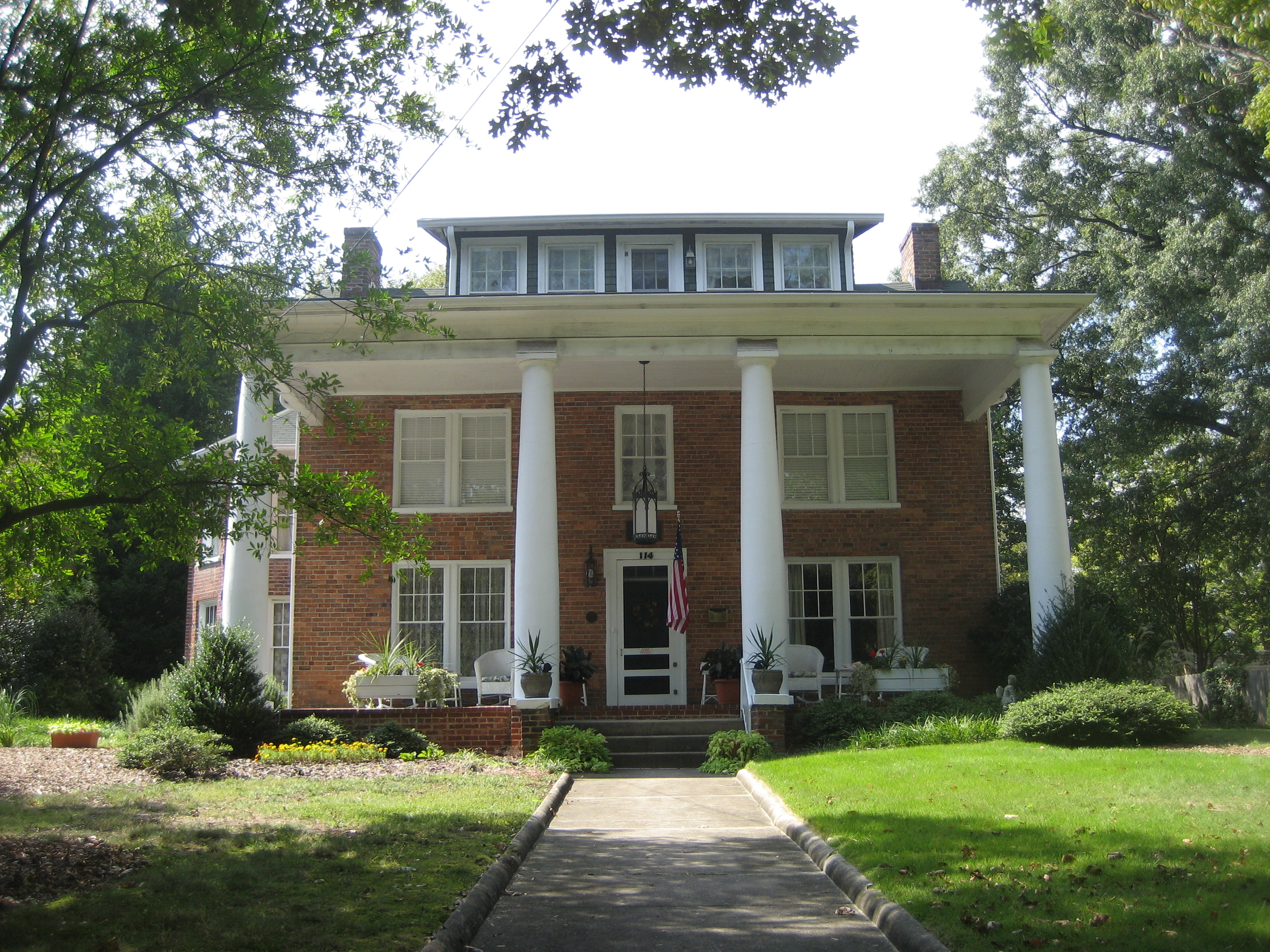
- Bumpas-Troy House, September 2012

- Location within North Carolina Location within the United States
- Location: 114 S. Mendenhall St., Greensboro, North Carolina
- Coordinates: 36°4′20″N 79°48′12″W
- Area: less than one acre
- Built: 1847
- Architectural style: Greek Revival
- NRHP reference No.: 77001000
- Added to NRHP: December 6, 1977

Bumpas-Troy House is a historic home which is located at Greensboro, Guilford County, North Carolina. It was built in 1847, and is a 2 1/2-story, three-bay, Greek Revival-style brick dwelling. The front facade features a two-story portico.

It was listed on the National Register of Historic Places in 1977. It is in the College Hill Historic District.

A bed-and-breakfast inn was operated in the house from 1992 through October 2016.

== See also ==
- Frances Webb Bumpass
