= UNCG University Libraries =

Walter Clinton Jackson Library
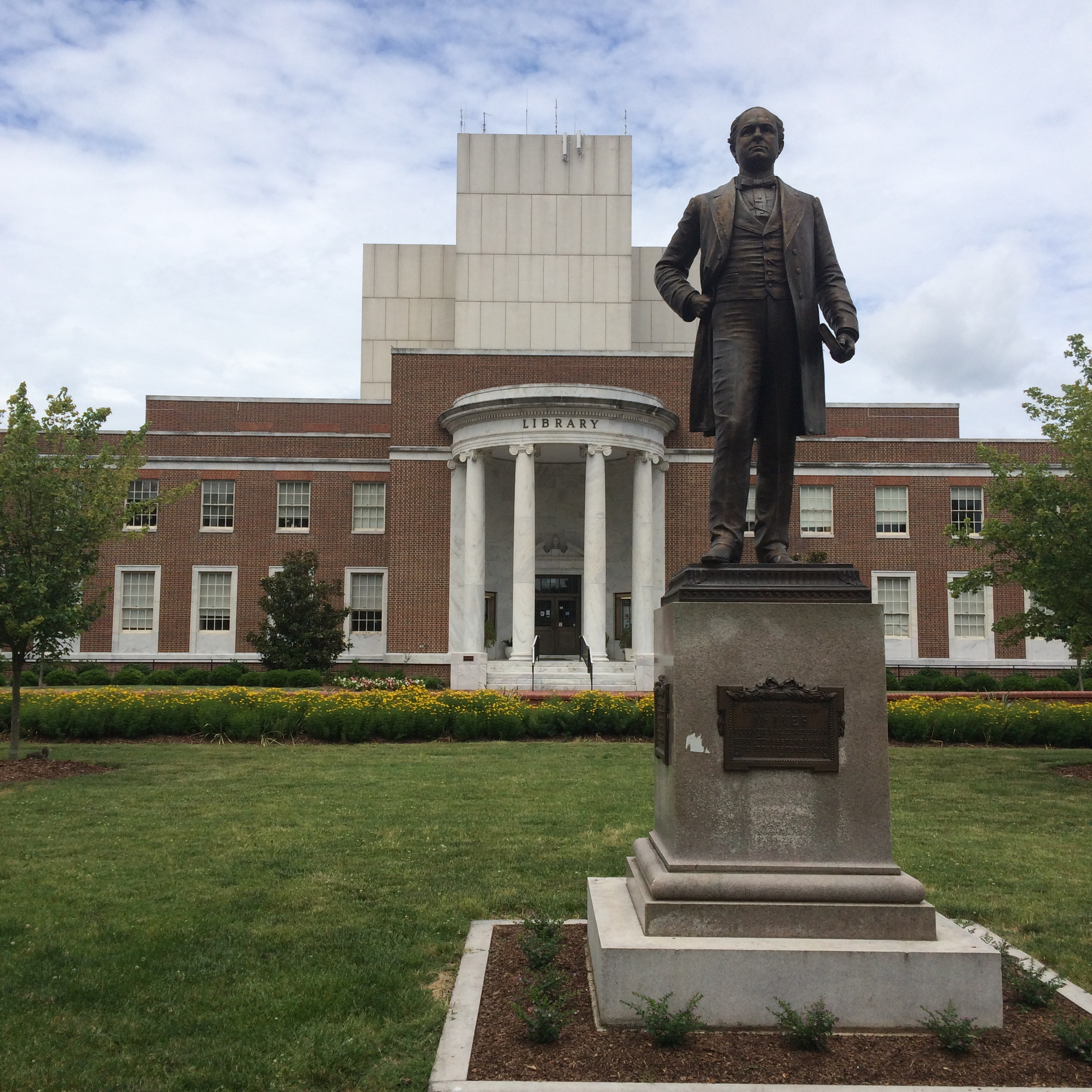
- Front entrance to Jackson Library
- Location: University of North Carolina at Greensboro, Greensboro, North Carolina, United States
- Branch of: UNCG Libraries

Other information
- Website: library.uncg.edu

The University of North Carolina at Greensboro University Libraries system has two branches on campus, both located in Greensboro, NC. These include the Walter Clinton Jackson Library and the Harold Schiffman Music Library. Affiliated campus libraries include the Teaching Resource Center and SELF Design Studio in the School of Education, the Interior Architecture Library in the Gatewood Studio Arts Building, and the Intercultural Resource Center located in the Elliot University Center. During the fall and spring semesters, Jackson Library provides a 24/5 study space for UNCG students, faculty and staff with UNCG ID from 12 am Monday – 7:00 am Friday. Michael A. Crumpton is the current Interim Dean of the libraries.

== History ==
When State Normal and Industrial School (now UNCG) first opened its doors in October 1892, it did not have a library or library books. Yet, founding president Charles Duncan McIver spoke adamantly of the "Library we are to have," and he personally donated many of his books to begin the school's first reference collection. Other faculty members followed suit, donating or lending books from their personal libraries in order to create a collection for student use. The school's book collection continued to grow, and, in 1896, Annie Florence Petty was hired as State Normal's first librarian. On October 2, 1905, the library at the State Normal and Industrial College (now The University of North Carolina at Greensboro) moved from a small room in the Main building (now the Foust building) to the newly constructed Carnegie Library (now the Forney Building). Recognizing the ever-growing need for more library space, College President Charles D. McIver contacted Andrew Carnegie, a well-known philanthropist and strong supporter of libraries, and asked for the funds needed to construct the building. Remarkably, he agreed to fund the entire project, which totaled $18,868 at its completion.

Unfortunately, tragedy struck the library on September 15, 1932, when it mysteriously caught fire. The final damage to the building and its contents, including the books, was estimated to be approximately $98,000 (or $1.6 million today). Afterwards, Mr. Charles H. Stone, the college Librarian, began the arduous task of rebuilding the damaged library collection. Books and materials that could be salvaged and saved were transported to the Students' Building while materials in the stacks were left in place, but were not accessible to students.

The Carnegie Library was rebuilt and remained the primary library on campus until June 1950 when the more than 134,000 books were moved to a new, larger library building across the street, later named in honor of former Chancellor Walter Clinton Jackson. This older portion of the library still stands and houses much of the library administration and the special collections and university Archives. In 1964 the library became a federal document depository; it still retains the status as a selective depository for U.S. government documents, as well as a full depository for State documents. A nine-story tower addition was built to the main building in the 1970s, making it a landmark on campus. The nine flights of stairs in Jackson Library are equal to 125 feet tall.

== Collections and Spaces ==
The University Libraries' collections total more than 2 million printed books and federal and state documents. The Libraries house over one million printed volumes and provide access to more than 60,000 journals, more than 400,000 electronic books, and more than 360 electronic databases. The Digital Projects Team has created numerous digital collections, totaling more than 300,000 digital files, from the holdings of the University Libraries and other area institutions.

The Library Catalog of UNCG currently contains holdings for materials in the Walter Clinton Jackson Library, the Harold Schiffman Music Library, the Multicultural Resource Center, and the Teaching Resource Center. the holdings of Special Collections, Rare Books, and University Archives are increasingly available via the online catalog.

The Reference Collection is located in the ROI Department on the first floor of the Library's main wing. The collection consists of general and specialized encyclopedias, dictionaries, directories, and biographical sources. The Reference Collection also includes government reference sources, indexes and abstracts, telephone directories, and a map collection containing more than 12,000 items. Items do not circulate. The ROI Department's Subject Guides provide access to online and print resources on a variety of topics.

The Government Documents web pages provide extensive links to local, state, and national government information. The Government Documents collection is a part of the ROI Department. Service is at the main Reference Desk on the 1st floor. The collection includes both Federal and North Carolina documents. The Library Catalog contains records of the Library's collection of Federal documents published after 1976 and NC State documents published after 1987.

The Harold Schiffman Music Library is located on the main level of the School of Music, Theatre and Dance building (corner of W Market and McIver Streets) and supports the educational, research, and service goals of the University by providing music resources, information, and services required by students, faculty, staff and community members. The collection consists of sound recordings, video recordings, scores, books and serials about music. Faculty, staff, and students are welcome to come to the Harold Schiffman Music Library to listen to and view sound and video materials and to check out books and scores.

The Martha Blakeney Hodges Special Collections and University Archives (SCUA) is located on the second floor of the Library's main wing. SCUA houses rare books, photographs of the campus, performing arts collections, artifacts and textiles relating to student life, and archival and manuscript materials that document the history of the University.

Among the major book collections in Special Collections are the large and significant Woman's Collection, with titles from the fifteenth through the twentieth centuries; the American Women's Detective Fiction Collection; the Girls' Books in Series Collection; the American Trade Binding Collection; the Juvenile Collection; and the Book Arts Collection, containing a large compilation of artists' books, private press productions, books with fine illustrations, and books on bookbinding, typography, and paper-making. Among major authors represented with significant holdings are George Herbert, Emily Dickinson, Lois Lenski, Randall Jarrell, T. E. Lawrence, Rupert Brooke, and Charles Dickens. SCUA also has a manuscripts collection of 395 individual collections. Particular strengths of the collection are creative writing, including the papers of Randall Jarrell and mystery writer Margaret Maron; the fine and performing arts, including the papers of composer Peter Paul Fuchs; women's studies, including the letters of noted suffragettes; the records of business and politics leaders of the Piedmont region of North Carolina, including Congressman Howard Coble and philanthropist Joseph M. Bryan.

University Archives materials date from the founding of the University in 1891 and include the records of the presidents and chancellors, Boards of Trustees, faculty and student committees, societies and organizations, student publications, and many of the University's academic departments and administrative offices. Besides paper records, this collection includes extensive holdings of photographs, scrapbooks, oral histories, postcards, artifacts, and textiles.

SCUA also is the steward of two internationally known collections: the Betty H. Carter Women Veterans Historical Project and the largest holding of cello music-related materials.

NC DOCKS is a cooperative effort to make the scholarly output of the University of North Carolina System more available to the world. Current institutional participants include Appalachian State University, East Carolina University, North Carolina School of Science and Mathematics, UNC Charlotte, UNC Greensboro, UNC Pembroke, UNC Wilmington, and Western Carolina University. NC DOCKS includes many full text articles, audio recordings, dissertations, and other formats. All materials are indexed by Google and are freely available to scholars and researchers worldwide.

The Digital Projects Office, a part of the Electronic Resources and Information Technologies (ERIT) Department, is responsible for coordinating digital preservation and access projects both within the library and for external keepers of unique historical material, including UNCG faculty and local cultural heritage organizations. The Digital Projects Priorities Team has identified four collection priority areas for new digital projects based on collection strengths and priorities within the University and the University Libraries: 1) University history; 2) local and regional history; 3) women's history; 4) the performing arts.

Most of the reserve materials are now available online through Blackboard, but the Libraries do still maintain a small print reserves collection, located at the check out desk on the first floor.

The Digital Media Commons supports the 21st Century learning and curriculum goals of University of North Carolina at Greensboro and the University Libraries by providing the space, technology, resources, services and expertise to support the digital creation of multimedia projects. Its goals are to provide interactive consultation services to UNCG students, faculty and staff in creating multimedia projects for their instructional and professional needs; to provide faculty development opportunities in creating multimedia assignments to develop students' information and digital literacy skills; and to provide the space and technology to screen, edit films and other media, practice presentations and collaborate.

== Special Collections and University Archives ==
The Martha Blakeney Hodges Special Collections and University Archives are located on the second and third floors of the Library's main 1950 building. Regular hours are 9-5 Monday-Friday when Jackson Library is open. Please contact staff when planning a research visit, class tour, or class workshop.

Among the major book collections in Special Collections are the large and significant Woman's Collection, with titles from the fifteenth through the twentieth centuries; the American Women's Detective Fiction Collection; the Girls' Books in Series Collection; the American Trade Binding Collection; the Juvenile Collection; and the Book Arts Collection.

University Archives collects the documents and records - both published and unpublished - relevant to the history of the University of North Carolina at Greensboro. Records of the past Chancellors, a collection of over 50,000 images dating from the 1890s, and University and student publications are among the more than two million items preserved in the Archives.

The Manuscripts section of the Martha Blakeney Hodges Special Collections and University Archives concentrates on acquiring, preserving, and providing access to collections that document the history, cultural life, economics, and politics of the North Carolina Piedmont. Collections include materials that relate to the subjects of art, education, local history and politics, literature, music, civil rights and human rights, nursing, physical education and dance, politics, theater, university history, and women's studies.

The Betty H. Carter Women Veterans Historical Project documents the female experience in the U.S. Armed Forces through letters, papers, photographs, published materials, uniforms, artifacts, and oral histories. It contains more than 550 collections which include over 350 oral histories. Housed and maintained in the University Archives in Jackson Library, the materials are a research collection for scholars of military history as well as women's studies.

The Cello Music Collections at the Martha Blakeney Hodges Special Collections and University Archives are dedicated to acquiring, preserving, and making accessible cello music collections for research and learning. The cello music collections at UNCG constitute the largest single holding of cello music-related materials in the world. Among the cellists represented are Elizabeth Cowling, Maurice Eisenberg, Bernard Greenhouse, Fritz Magg, Rudolf Matz, Luigi Silva, Janos Scholz, and Laszlo Varga. The collections also include musical scores and other publications which complement the materials in the other Cello Music Collections.

The mission of the North Carolina Literary Map, administered by the Special Collections and University Archives Department, is to highlight the literary heritage of the state by connecting the lives and creative work of authors to real (and imaginary) geographic locations. Through the development of a searchable and browseable data-driven online map, users are able to access a database, learning tools, and cultural resources, to deepen their understanding of specific authors as well as the cultural space that shaped these literary works.

== Library Services ==
The Libraries provide a variety of quiet and group study spaces in both Jackson Library and the Harold Schiffman Music Library. Students, faculty and staff may reserve group spaces, many of which are equipped with technology, through a reservation system on the Libraries' home page. Over 200 computers provide students with access to information resources as well as a wide variety of software. In addition to circulating books both the Jackson and Schiffman Libraries check out films, CDs and technology including laptops, iPads, video cameras, voice recorders and calculators. The Check Out Desk in Jackson Library, maintained by the Access Services and Delivery Department (ASD), is staffed whenever the building is opened, including 24/5 service during the academic year. ASD also offers reserves, on-campus delivery of materials to faculty and Interlibrary Loan for all UNCG users. The Research, Outreach and Instruction (ROI) Department and the Schiffman Music Library provide research assistance to UNCG students, faculty and staff and members of the community in-house and also through on-line chat, email and telephone. An extensive information literacy program reaches students from the first-year through graduate work. Librarians provide classroom instruction through the UNCG curriculum and develop a wide variety of online tutorials. Distance students are reached through both synchronous and asynchronous instruction.

A Libraries' liaison is assigned to each UNCG academic program. Liaisons work closely with faculty to develop the print and electronic resources for their discipline. They also help faculty develop effective information literacy assignments so that students gain these important skills. Liaisons also provide in-depth research consultations for students and faculty. The Libraries maintain extensive LibGuides, online research guides, to provide easy access to resources in academic disciplines and other subject areas. LibGuides are also developed for specific classes.
