= The Carolinian (student newspaper) =

Student newspaper at the University of North Carolina at Greensboro

- Type: Student newspaper
- Publisher: University of North Carolina at Greensboro
- Editor-in-chief: Carole-Anne Morris
- Founded: 1919
- Language: English
- Headquarters: Greensboro, North Carolina
- Country: United States
- Circulation: 5,000 (as of 2017)
- Price: Free
- Website: carolinianuncg.com

The Carolinian is the student newspaper of the University of North Carolina at Greensboro. It is published weekly throughout the traditional academic year.

== History ==
The paper was established at the State Normal and Industrial College (now UNC Greensboro) in 1919. It is a teaching newspaper and is written and edited entirely by students. The first issue was published on May 19, 1919. The paper's first editor was Florence Miller.

The Carolinian circulates 5,000 copies weekly throughout the traditional academic year.
