= Julius I. Foust Building =

Historic university building in North Carolina, US

- U.S. National Register of Historic Places
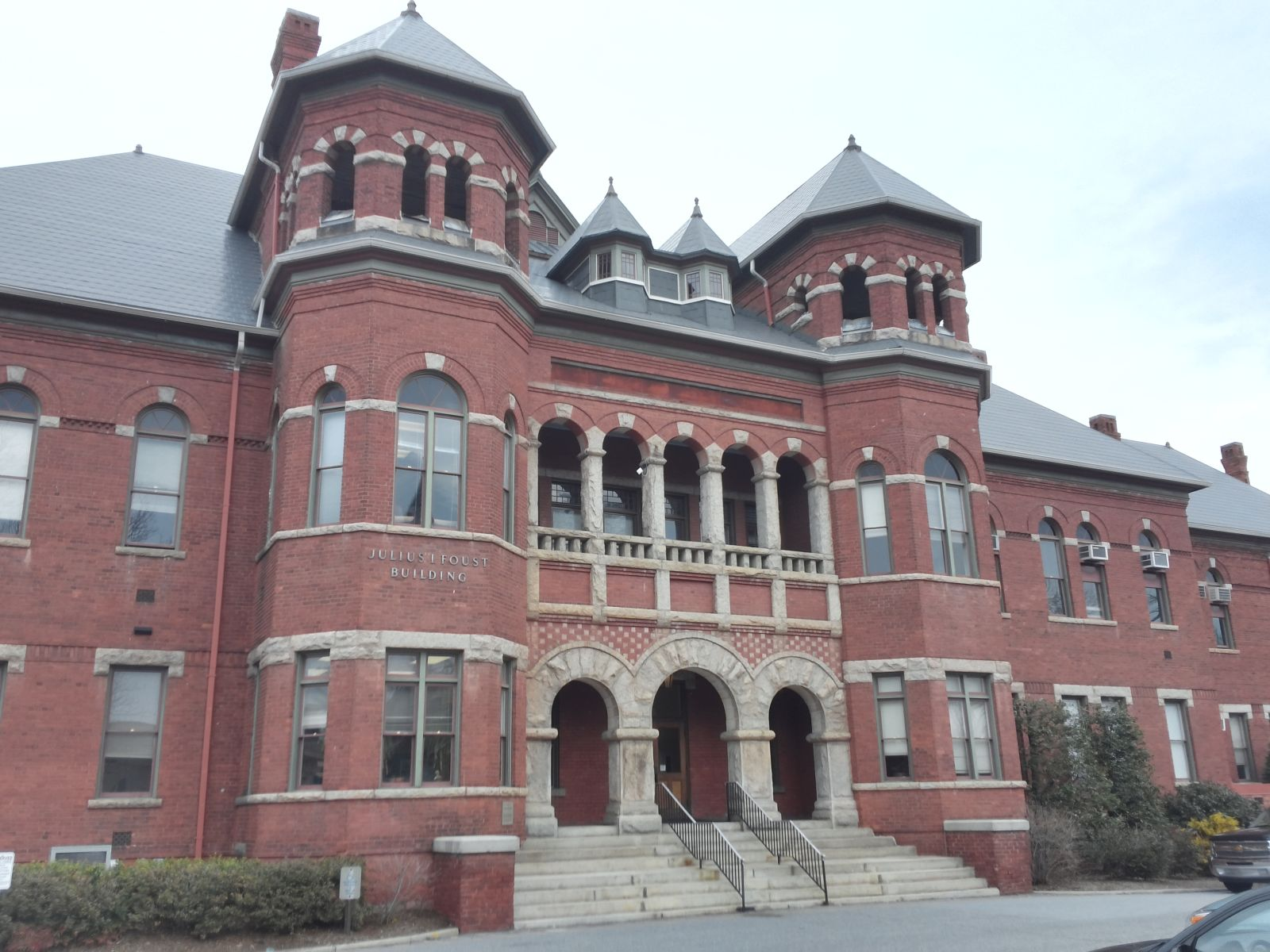
- Julius I. Foust Building

- Location within North Carolina Location within the United States
- Location: 1000 W. Spring Garden St., Greensboro, North Carolina
- Coordinates: 36°4′1″N 79°48′29″W
- Area: less than one acre
- Built: 1891
- Architects: Epps & Hackett
- Architectural style: Romanesque, Collegiate Romanesque Revival
- NRHP reference No.: 80002838
- Added to NRHP: September 11, 1980

The Julius I. Foust Building on the campus of The University of North Carolina at Greensboro in Greensboro, North Carolina was built in 1891. Greensboro architects Orlo Epps and partner C. M. Hackett designed the building and contractor Thomas Woodroffe built it.

Originally, the structure was known as the Main Building. It served as the sole administrative and classroom building for the school until 1908 when the McIver Building was constructed. At that time in 1908, the building's name was changed to the Administration Building. And in 1960, it was renamed in memory of the school's second president, Julius Isaac Foust.

The Foust Building was listed on the National Register of Historic Places in 1980. It is the only surviving nineteenth-century structure on the campus.
