= Charles Duncan McIver =

American academic and university founder (1860–1906)

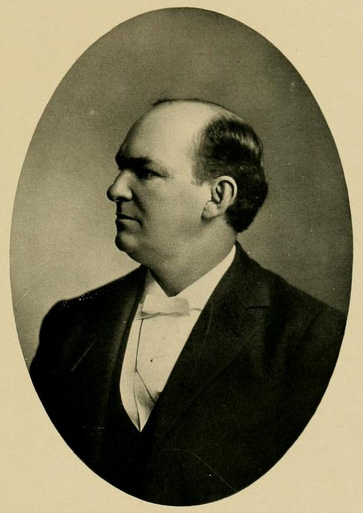
- McIver pictured in The Carolinian 1902, UNCG yearbook

President of The University of North Carolina at Greensboro
- In office 1891–1906
- Succeeded by: Julius Foust

Personal details
- Born: September 27, 1860 Lee County, North Carolina
- Died: September 17, 1906 (aged 45) between Raleigh & Greensboro

Charles Duncan McIver (September 27, 1860 – September 17, 1906) was the founder and first president of the institution now known as The University of North Carolina at Greensboro.

== Life and career ==
He was born 1860 in Moore County, (later became Lee County)North Carolina and graduated from UNC-Chapel Hill, where he was a member of the Dialectic and Philanthropic Societies, in 1881. McIver became a teacher in Durham and Winston North Carolina until 1889 when he and Edwin A. Alderman were chosen by the Office of the Superintendent of Public Instruction to hold teacher institutes across the state.

As crusaders for women′s education, McIver and Alderman first drew up a plan for a state-supported teachers′ college in 1886. In 1891, they advocated for a new bill focused on a teachers′ college specifically for women (not co–educational). The North Carolina legislature passed this bill, and issued a charter for a ″Normal and Industrial School for White Girls″ on February 18, 1891.

McIver was chosen to be the first president of the State Normal and Industrial School (now UNCG), which opened to students on October 5, 1892. In addition to serving as president, he also taught many of the courses in the pedagogy department. His initial salary was $2250 per year.

McIver was married to Lula V. Martin and they had four children. He died on September 17, 1906, of apoplexy on a train taking William Jennings Bryan from Raleigh to Greensboro. He was buried in Greensboro.

UNCG's McIver Street, two former buildings (The McIver Memorial Building c. 1908 – 1956; and its replacement, The McIver Building 1958-2018 [both demolished]), and McIver Parking Deck are named after him, and a statue (dubbed "Charlie" by students) was erected in his honor. It was a campus tradition to paint messages and clothes on the beloved founder until the donation of "The Rawk" in 1973. A duplicate statue is on the grounds of the North Carolina state capitol in Raleigh. He is the only person honored on Capitol Square who was not a political or military leader.

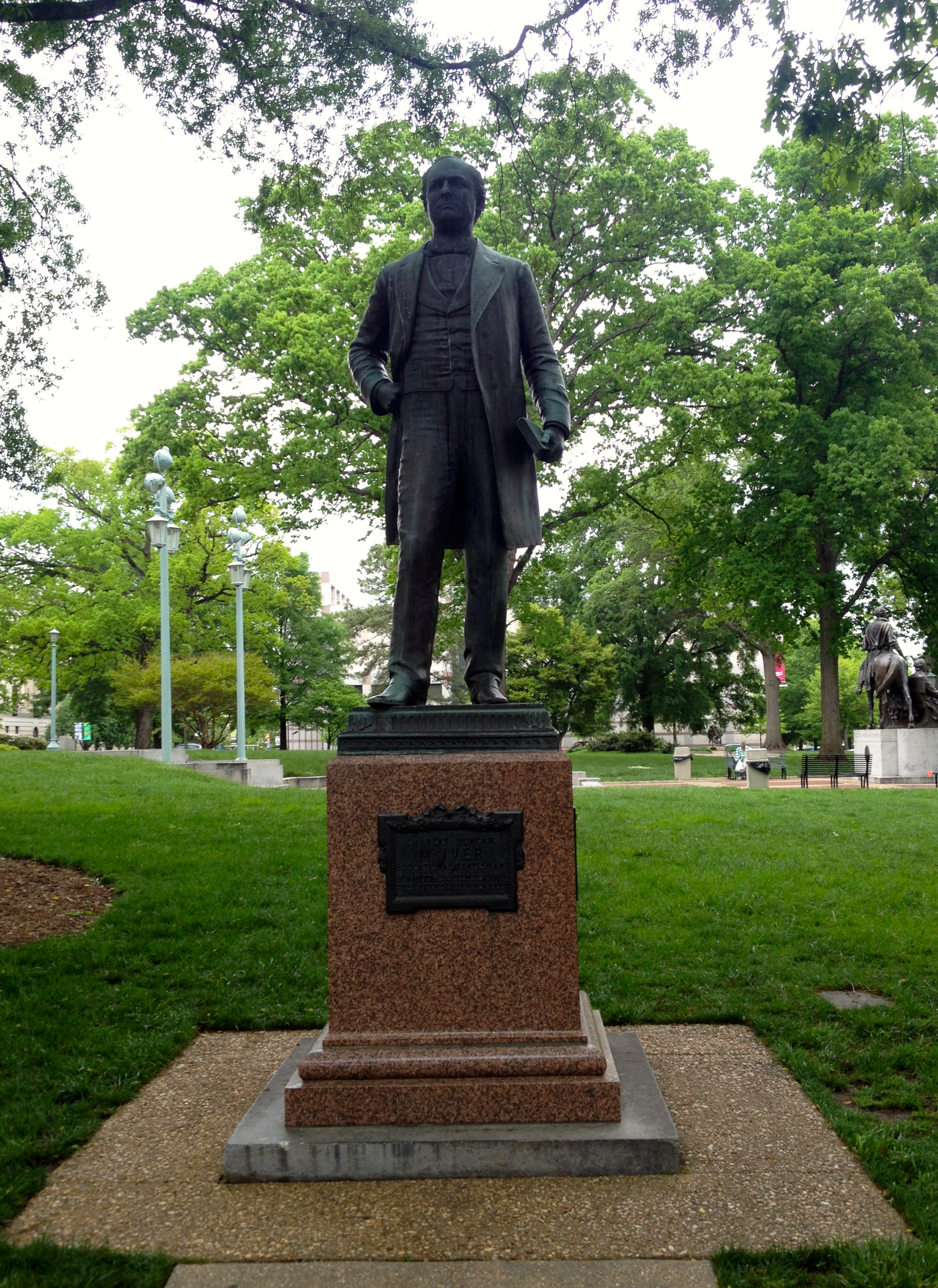
Charles Duncan McIver Statue

Schools named in his honor include the former Charles D. McIver School at Greensboro, Charles McIver School in Kannapolis (opened in 1908, no longer in use) and the Charles Duncan McIver Special Education Center in Guilford County.
