= University of North Carolina at Greensboro =

Public university in Greensboro, North Carolina, US

Coordinates: 36°04′10.20″N 79°48′41.04″W

- Former names: State Normal and Industrial School (1891–1896); State Normal and Industrial College (1896–1919); North Carolina College for Women (1919–1932); Woman's College of the University of North Carolina (1932–1963)
- Motto: "Service"
- Type: Public research university
- Established: February 18, 1891; 135 years ago
- Parent institution: University of North Carolina
- Accreditation: SACS
- Academic affiliations: CUMU
- Endowment: $471 million (2025)
- Chancellor: Franklin D. Gilliam, Jr.
- Provost: Alan Boyette
- Faculty: 1,145 (859 full-time and 286 part-time) (2019 fall)
- Students: 19,764 (2020 fall)
- Undergraduates: 15,995 (2020 fall)
- Postgraduates: 3,769 (2020 fall)
- Location: Greensboro, North Carolina, United States
- Campus: 250 acres (100 ha); Large city
- Newspaper: The Carolinian
- Colors: Gold, white, and navy blue
- Nickname: Spartans
- Sporting affiliations: NCAA Division I – SoCon
- Mascot: "Spiro" the Spartan
- Website: www.uncg.edu

The University of North Carolina at Greensboro (UNCG or UNC Greensboro) is a public research university in Greensboro, North Carolina. It is part of the University of North Carolina system. It is accredited by the Southern Association of Colleges and Schools Commission on Colleges to award baccalaureate, master's, specialist, and doctoral degrees.

The university offers over 100 undergraduate, 61 master's, and 26 doctoral programs. UNCG is also home to the Weatherspoon Art Museum.

== History ==
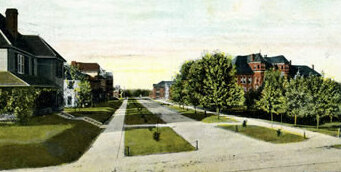
North Carolina State Normal and Industrial School, ca. 1906.

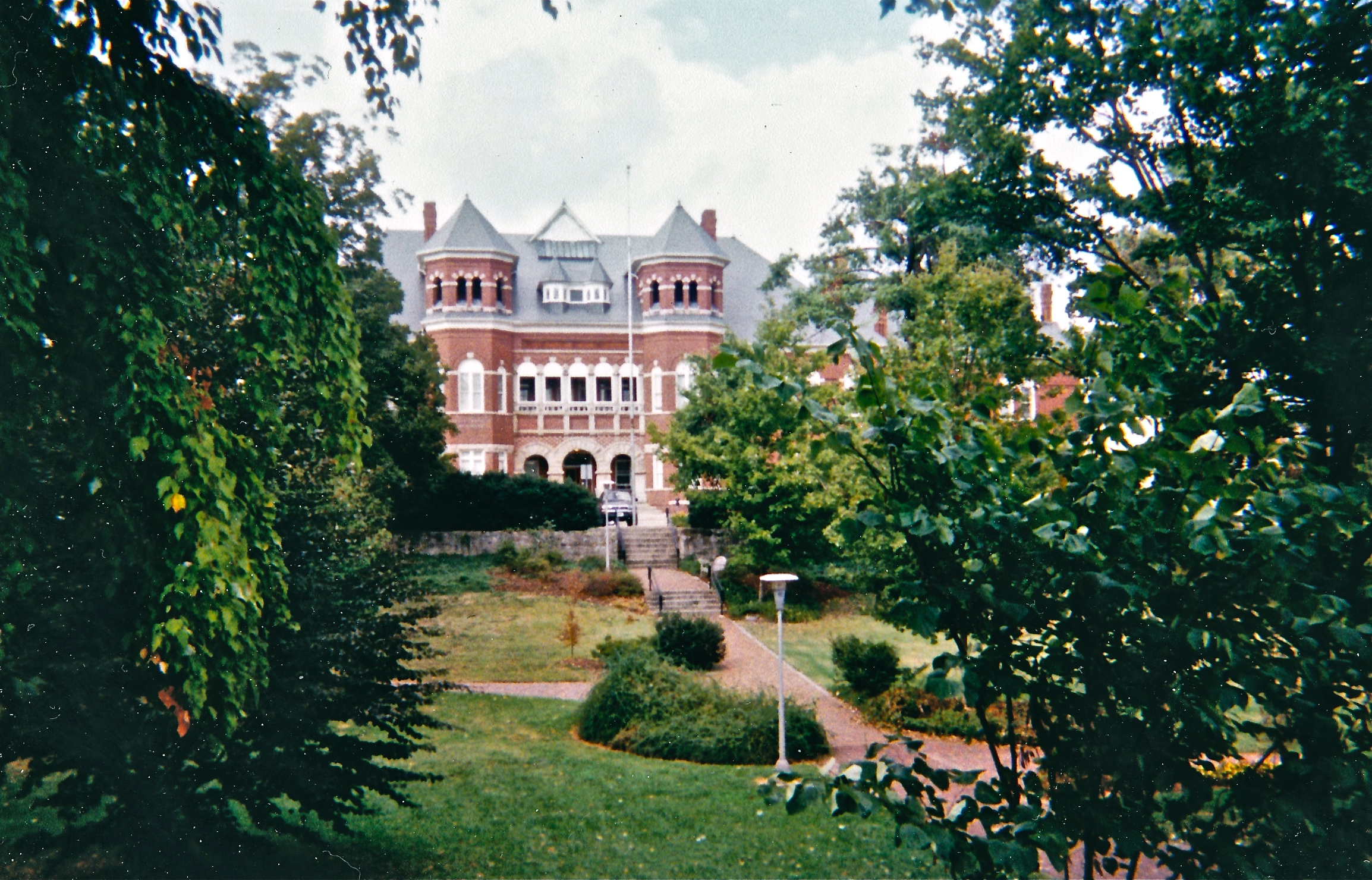
Julius I. Foust Building, built in 1891.

The university was established as a woman's college in 1891 by legislative enactment and opened in 1892. Credit for the establishment of UNCG is given to Charles Duncan McIver. McIver served as the institution's first chief executive officer with the title of President. This position was also known as Dean of Administration after 1934 and Chancellor since 1945.

The school provided business, domestic science, and teaching instruction, with a student body of 223 and a faculty of 15 in its first year. R. S. Pullen and R. T. Gray donated the original 10-acre (4.0 ha) site in Greensboro, where the first building was erected, with state funds totaling $30,000.

It is North Carolina's first and only public university founded to educate women. In 1949, it became the nation's largest all-female institution.

The school has seen many names over the years, changing from the State Normal and Industrial School to the State Normal and Industrial College in 1896, and again in 1919 to North Carolina College for Women. In 1932, it changed to the Woman's College of the University of North Carolina, when it became one of the three charter institutions of the Consolidated University of North Carolina; it changed again to the University of North Carolina at Greensboro when men were first admitted to the school in 1963.

In 2002, Janet Danahey set fire to one of the university student apartment buildings, killing four people and injuring six.

== Recognition and rankings ==
Academic rankings

National
- Forbes: 559
- U.S. News & World Report: 258
- Washington Monthly: 96
- WSJ/College Pulse: 501–600

Global
- THE: 601–800
- U.S. News & World Report: 1038

In 2023, Forbes magazine's "America's Top Colleges" ranked UNC Greensboro 485th out of 650 universities, liberal arts colleges, and service academies nationwide, 216th among public universities, and 108th among schools in the South.

In 2023, Money magazine ranked UNC Greensboro as one of “America’s Best Colleges.”

In its 2022 rankings, U.S. News & World Report ranked UNC Greensboro tied for 219th in “National Universities,” tied 112th in the ranking of "Top Public Schools," and 214th in “Best Value Schools.”

In its 2021 rankings, U.S. News & World Report ranked UNC Greensboro tied for 258th out of 389 national universities, tied for 126th in its ranking of 209 "Top Public Schools", and 23rd out of 389 universities in "Top Performers on Social Mobility".

In its 2019–2020 rankings, Money magazine ranked UNC Greensboro 509th for "best value" out of 744 universities in the U.S.

In 2020, Washington Monthly ranked UNC Greensboro 96th out of 389 schools on its National Universities list. Washington Monthly assesses the quality of schools based on social mobility, research, and promoting public service.

In 2019, Forbes magazine's "America's Top Colleges" list ranked UNC Greensboro 559th out of 650 universities, liberal arts colleges, and service academies nationwide; 202nd among public universities, and 128th among schools in the South.

== Campus ==
The Fountain in front of the Dining Halls.

Historic structures include the Julius I. Foust Building (1891), Spencer Hall (1904, 1907), the Quad (1919–1923), the Chancellor's Residence (1923), the former Aycock Auditorium (1927), renamed UNCG Auditorium (2016), and Alumni House (1937). Other features include a statue of Minerva, to the east of Elliott University Center. The goddess Minerva has been a part of campus from the first diploma bearing her likeness in 1894 to the statue erected near the center in 2003. Minerva also inspired the university's new graphic identity program, which was launched in 2004.

== Athletics ==
The intercollegiate athletics program at The University of North Carolina at Greensboro reaches as far back as the late 1940s. During the 1980s, all Spartan teams competed in Division III (non-scholarship) and then Division II (scholarship) of the National Collegiate Athletic Association, and all teams have competed in Division 1 since Fall 1991. Between 1982 and 1987 the Men's Soccer team won the NCAA Division III national championship title every year except for 1984. Today UNCG competes in the Southern Conference, which is made up of 10 schools across five states in the Southeast.

UNCG's men's basketball team moved into a "new" home in 2009–10, making the Greensboro Coliseum their home court.

Former UNCG women's basketball coach Lynne Agee, who retired following the 2010–11 season, ranks among the most successful coaches in intercollegiate women's basketball history. She is one of just 45 coaches in the history of the women's game to have engineered more than 600 victories. Under Agee's guidance, UNCG reached the 20-win plateau 16 times. The Spartans also earned berths into the Division I national tournament once, the Division II tournament once and the Division III tournament seven times. With Agee at the helm, UNCG became one of only 10 teams nationally (all divisions) to reach the NCAA tournament each of the first seven years it was held (1982–88). With UNCG's 1998 NCAA appearance, Agee became the first women's coach in history to take teams to the NCAA tournament in all three divisions.

== Student life ==
Undergraduate demographics as of Fall 2023
Race and ethnicity	Total
White	39%
Black	31%
Hispanic	17%
Asian	6%
Two or more races	5%
International student	1%
Unknown	1%
Economic diversity
Low-income (Note: The percentage of students who received an income-based federal Pell grant intended for low-income students.)	49%
Affluent (Note: The percentage of students who are a part of the American middle class at the bare minimum.)	51%

=== Clubs ===
In 2010, clubs and organizations affiliated with UNCG included 36 honor societies and 20 fraternities and sororities. UNCG also has an active student government association, founded in 1910, Campus Activities Board (CAB), and several foreign culture groups, a Neo-Black Society, PRIDE! (An LGBT support and acceptance group.), Queer Student Collective, The Science Fiction Fantasy Federation, a Cosplay Club, and various performing arts, religious and service programs. Student media groups also produce UNCG's newspaper The Carolinian, CORADDI fine arts magazine, and the campus radio station, WUAG.

=== Club sports ===
All clubs are recognized student organizations through the UNCG's Office of Campus Activities & Programs.

This is a list of clubs that are members of the Club Sports Council:

- Basketball (Women's)
- Bass Fishing
- Equestrian
- Esports
- Fencing
- Football
- Lacrosse (Men's)
- Lacrosse (Women's)
- Quidditch
- Rugby (Men's)
- Rugby (Women's)
- Running
- Soccer (Men's)
- Soccer (Women's)
- Softball
- Swimming
- Tennis
- Ultimate Frisbee (Women's)
- Volleyball

== University libraries ==
The UNCG University Libraries system has two branches. They are:

- the Walter Clinton Jackson Library (the main campus library); this includes the Martha Blakeney Hodges Special Collections and University Archives
- the Harold Schiffman Music Library

Other affiliated libraries on campus include:

- the Michel Family Teaching Resources Center and the SELF Design Studio (housed in the School of Education)
- the Intercultural Resource Center Library (located in the Elliot University Center)

== Academic units ==
UNCG is home to research institutes and centers including the Gateway University Research Park, Center for Applied Research, Center for Creative Writing in the Arts, Center for Drug Discovery, Institute for Community and Economic Engagement, Center for Biotechnology, Genomics & Health Research, Music Research Institute and the Southeastern Regional Vision for Education (SERVE).

The university is organized into one traditional college, one specialty college, one professional college, and seven professional schools:

- College of Arts and Sciences
- College of Visual and Performing Arts
- Lloyd International Honors College
- Joseph M. Bryan School of Business and Economics
- School of Education
- School of Health and Human Sciences
- School of Nursing
- Joint School of Nanoscience and Nanoengineering
- The Graduate School

=== College of Arts and Sciences ===
The College of Arts and Sciences is the largest of the eight academic units that make up the university, with almost 500 full-time faculty in 21 academic departments and seven interdepartmental programs, spanning the arts, humanities, social sciences, natural sciences, and mathematics. John Z. Kiss was appointed Dean on July 1, 2016.

UNCG requires all students, no matter what their major, to complete a General Education Curriculum (GEC) that includes courses in the traditional liberal arts, as well as courses that introduce them to new perspectives that have become increasingly important today. The college offers most of the university's general education courses, in addition to the hundreds of more specialized courses that make up its undergraduate majors and graduate programs.

==== English Department ====
The English Department, established in 1893, offers a Bachelor of Arts, Master of Arts, PhD, and multiple minors. The writing program was, and continues to be, one of the most popular and successful parts of department. A writing center was established in 1985 aimed at students in the College of Arts and Sciences. Today, the university Writing Center caters to all students and faculty and is housed under the Division of Student Success along with a Speaking Center, Digital ACT Studio, and Academic Achievement Center. The department is ranked #7 in 2021 in NC for the English BA. The PhD program has been recognized on U.S. News & World Report's 2022 Best Graduate School Rankings as the #3 PhD in English program in NC and #99 overall.

The English Department is housed in the Moore Humanities and Research Administration Building, but was previously housed in the now-demolished McIver Building, which was called "the ugliest classroom building in America."

For a brief period in 1973, Nobel prize winner Louise Gluck held a position in the department as a visiting poet. Other notable emeritus faculty include Fred Chappell and Craig Nova.

=== Lloyd International Honors College ===
The Lloyd International Honors College offers three Honors academic programs that allow students to enhance their general-education studies (International Honors Program), work in their major (Disciplinary Honors Program), or their entire undergraduate education while at UNCG (Full Honors Program). All Honors students take special Honors courses that are generally restricted to no more than 20–25 students and often have an interdisciplinary focus. For those who wish to complete International Honors or Full University Honors, an international experience and a second language are required.

=== Joseph M. Bryan School of Business and Economics ===
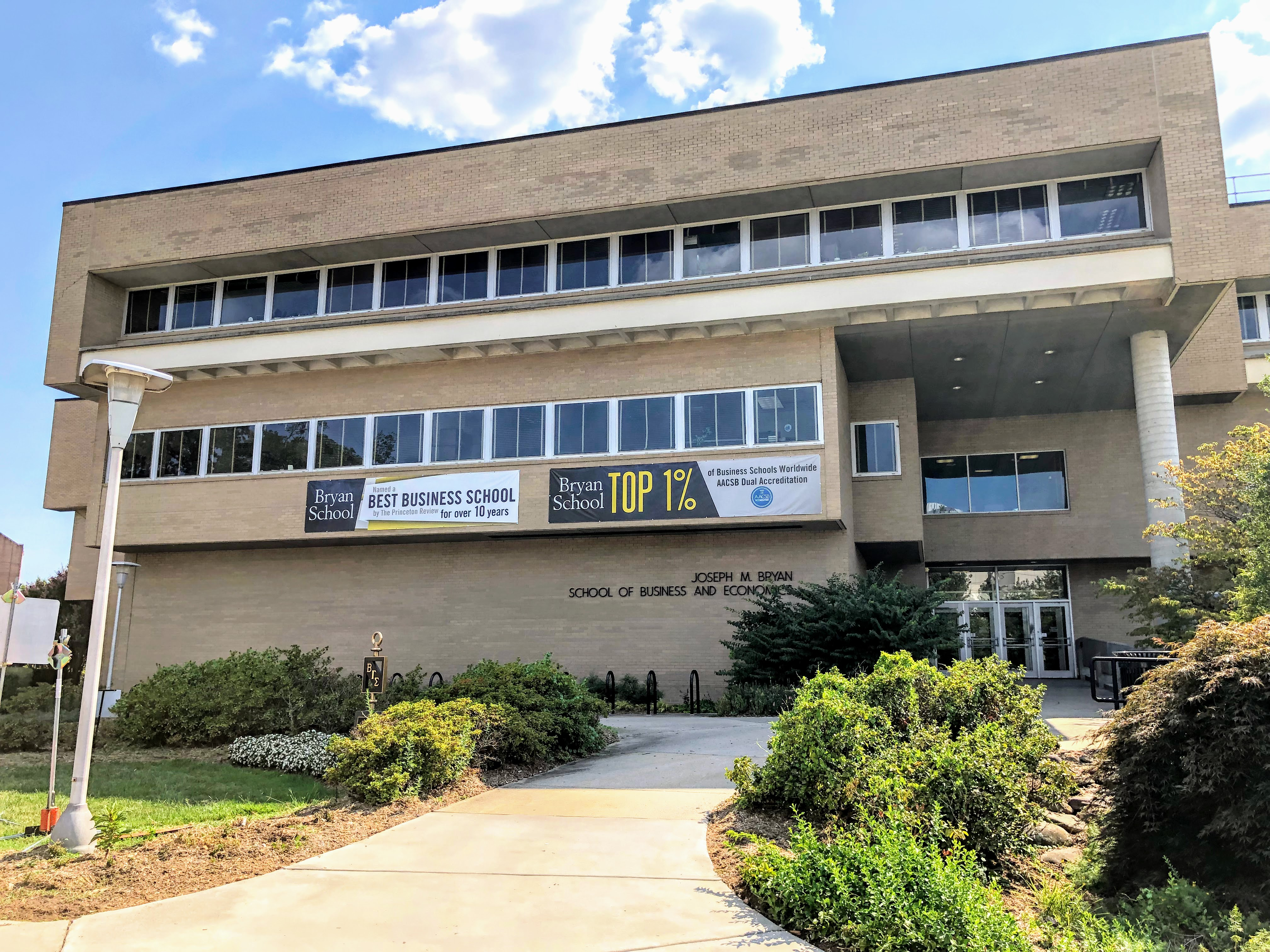
The Bryan building, home of the business school, was completed in 1979.

The Bryan School of Business and Economics is the largest of UNCG's seven professional schools. It was founded in 1969 and is named for Joseph M. Bryan, a prominent figure in North Carolina business and philanthropy. The Bryan School is among the top 1 percent of business schools worldwide that have achieved accreditation in both business and accounting by The Association to Advance Collegiate Schools of Business. The Bryan School has 73 full-time faculty, 3,200 undergraduates, and 460 graduate students. There are also more than 20,000 alumni.

=== School of Education ===
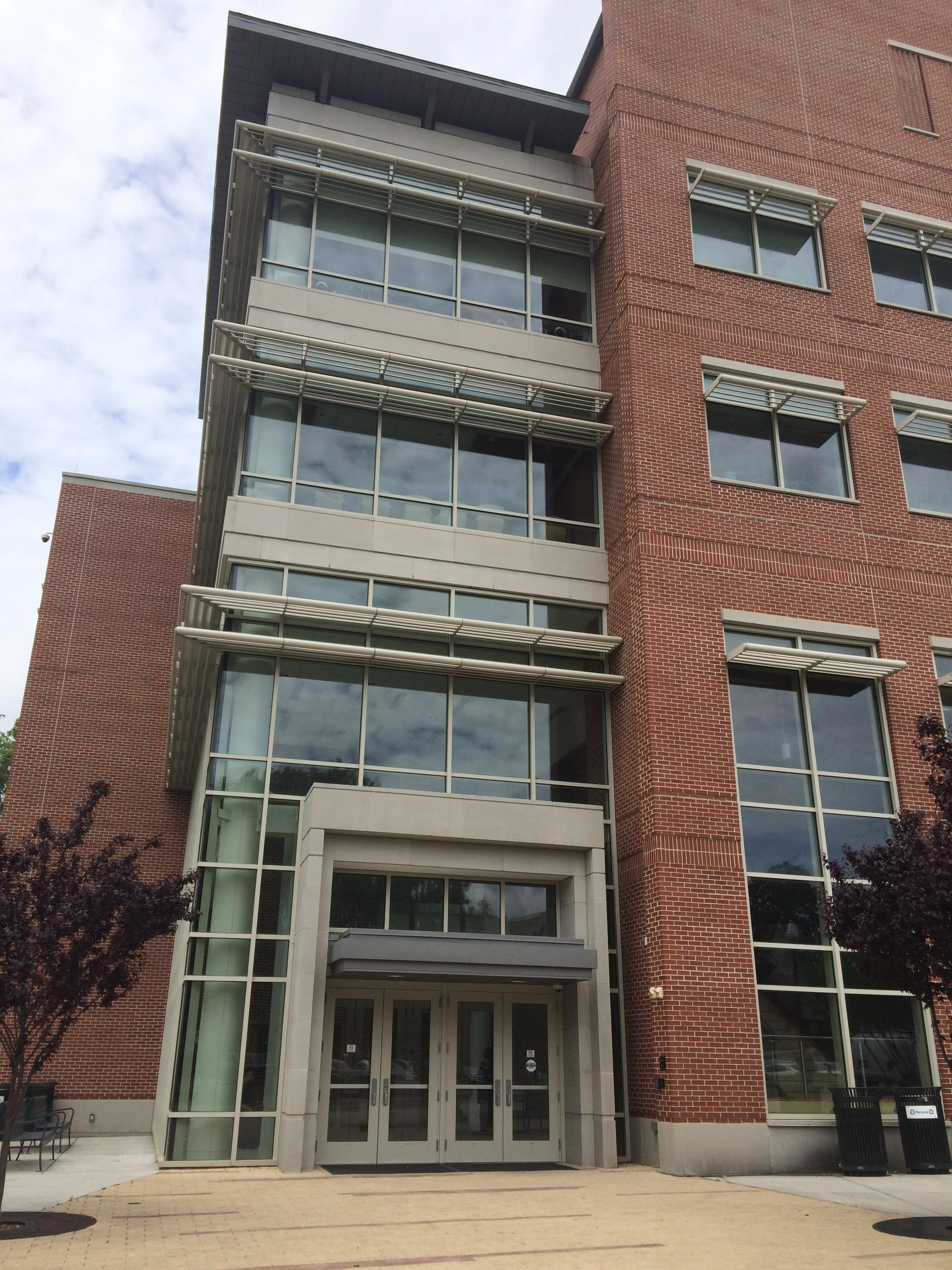
The School of Education at the University of North Carolina at Greensboro.

The School of Education has several graduate programs, notably a Doctorate in Philosophy (PhD) in Educational Studies with a Concentration in Cultural Studies from the Department of Educational Leadership and Cultural Foundations. The school's Department of Counseling and Educational Development has ranked among the nation's top-15 programs for over 30 straight years, ranking 4th among the nation's counseling programs (1st in North Carolina) in 2026.

The history of UNCG's School of Education has its roots in the founding of the university itself. Originally designated in 1891 as the North Carolina State Normal and Industrial School, UNCG was established as a school to train women educators, based on the assumption that if women received training they would, in turn, educate their children and ultimately improve the level of education and literacy in the state.

For almost a decade after the Normal was founded, the curriculum involved diplomas awarded for work that was distinctly below college level. At the time, few public high schools turned out female graduates who were prepared to handle college-level work. The Normal School became a full-fledged College in 1897. Baccalaureate degrees followed in 1903 and graduates were awarded a "diploma and life license" to teach in North Carolina.

=== College of Visual and Performing Arts ===
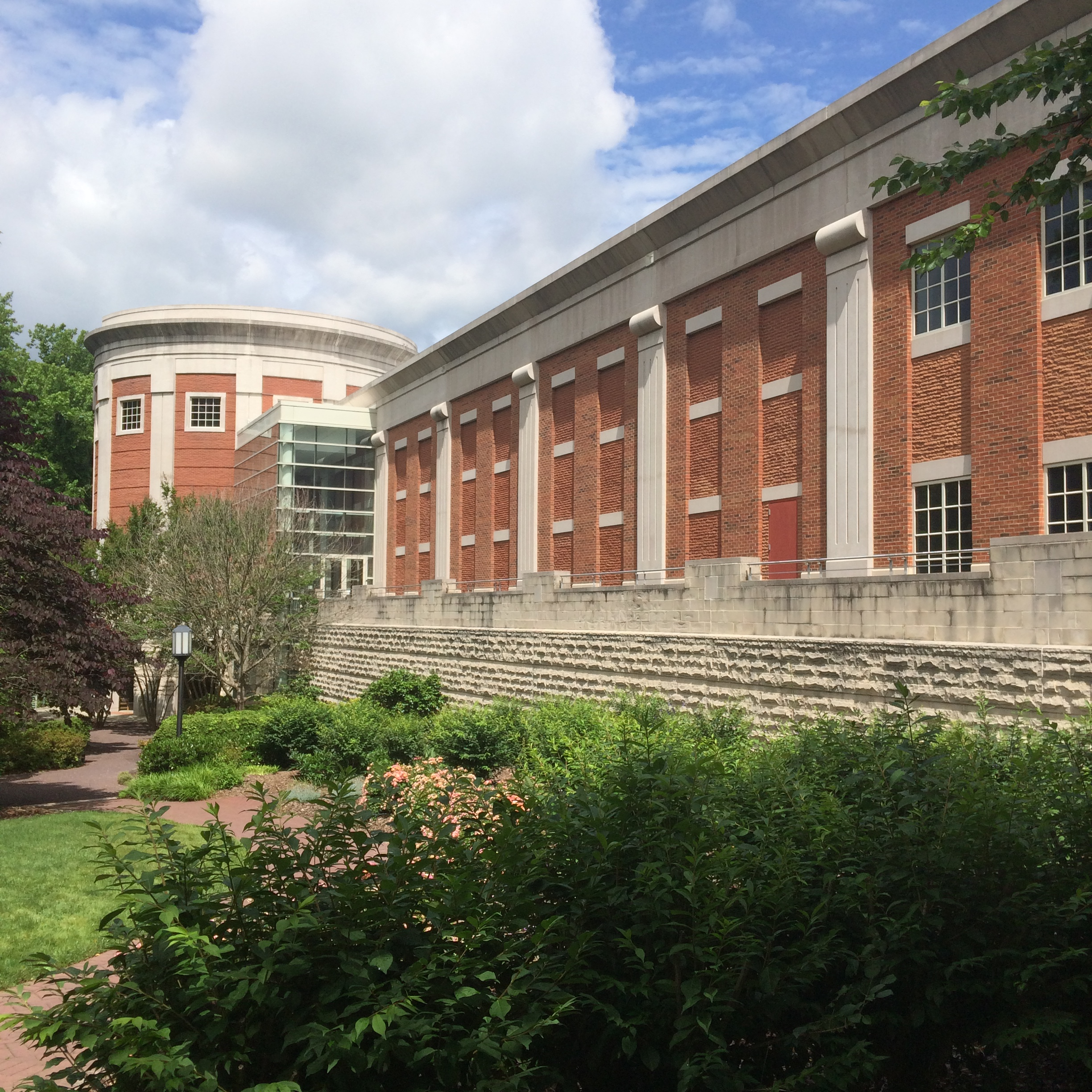
UNCG College of Visual and Performing Arts

The UNCG College of Visual and Performing Arts is home to over 900 student majors and more than 100 distinguished faculty members. On July 1, 2010, the School of Music was combined administratively with the departments of theater and dance to create the School of Music, Theatre and Dance. In 2016, the Department of Art was transferred from the College of Arts and Sciences, thus giving way to the renaming of the unit. The offices for the new combined school remain in the current music building, with the Art Department remaining at its present location.

=== School of Nursing ===
The School of Nursing was established in September 1966 under the leadership of the first dean, Eloise R. Lewis. The first class of BSN students graduated in 1970. In 1976, the MSN program was initiated. The School began the PhD program in the Fall 2005. The School continues to offer both undergraduate and graduate programs with over 4,000 alumni. The School also offers an outreach program in Hickory, North Carolina for RN to BSN students and a concentration in education for MSN students.

=== School of Nanoscience and Nanoengineering ===
The Joint School of Nanoscience & Nanoengineering ("JSNN") is a collaborative project between North Carolina Agricultural & Technical State University and UNCG.

The Joint School for Nanoscience and Nanoengineering is expected to offer Professional Master of Science and PhD degrees in Nanoscience and Nanoengineering. Nanoscience and Nanoengineering training for scientists and engineers already in the workforce.

Programs of study focus on three main areas: nanobioscience, which emphasizes biological and chemical aspects of nanoscience; nanotechnology, which emphasizes engineering and ecological aspects; and environmental nanoscience, which will address the ethical and environmental implications of nanoscience. These programs of study lead to Professional Master's or Ph.D. degrees. The biological and chemical research emphasis offered by the JSNN is the first in the nation. The only other two existing professional master's programs in nanoscience and nanoengineering are at Rice University and University at Albany, SUNY, neither of which offers a biological or chemical emphasis.

=== The Graduate School ===
The Graduate School at The University of North Carolina at Greensboro directs and manages the graduate programs on campus for approximately 3600 graduate students from 33 states and 34 foreign countries.
