= National Register of Historic Places listings in Guilford County, North Carolina =

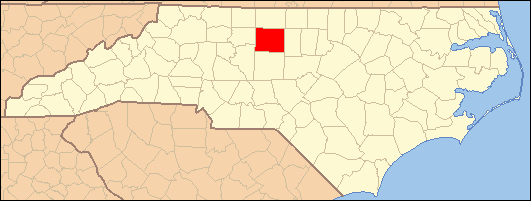
Map of North Carolina with Guilford County highlighted

This list includes properties and districts listed on the National Register of Historic Places in Guilford County, North Carolina. Click the "Map of all coordinates" link to the right to view an online map of all properties and districts with latitude and longitude coordinates in the table below.

This National Park Service list is complete through NPS recent listings posted May 22, 2026.

== Current listings ==
	Name on the Register	Image	Date listed	Location	City or town	Description
1	John H. Adams House	John H. Adams House	January 11, 2001 (#00001641)	1108 N. Main St. 35°58′12″N 80°00′54″W	High Point	
2	Agricultural and Technical College of North Carolina Historic District	Agricultural and Technical College of North Carolina Historic District	October 20, 1988 (#88002046)	E. side of Dudley St. between Bluford St. and Headen Dr. 36°04′28″N 79°46′39″W	Greensboro	
3	Col. Isaac Beeson House		October 16, 1980 (#80002836)	South of Colfax; 36°04′29″N 80°01′20″W	Colfax	
4	Charles Benbow House		August 19, 1982 (#82004842)	South of Oak Ridge on NC 150; 36°09′49″N 79°59′33″W	Oak Ridge	
5	Jesse Benbow House II		September 8, 1983 (#83001885)	NC 150; 36°09′50″N 80°00′08″W	Oak Ridge	
6	Bennett College Historic District	Bennett College Historic District	April 3, 1992 (#92000179)	Roughly bounded by E. Washington, Bennett and Gorrell Sts. 36°04′03″N 79°46′47″W	Greensboro	
7	Blandwood	Blandwood	April 17, 1970 (#70000455)	447 W. Washington St. 36°04′09″N 79°47′38″W	Greensboro	
8	Blue Bell Company Plant		November 27, 2020 (#100005841)	620 South Elm St. 36°03′54″N 79°47′27″W	Greensboro	
9	Buffalo Presbyterian Church and Cemetery	Buffalo Presbyterian Church and Cemetery	September 16, 2002 (#02000985)	800 and 803 Sixteenth St. 36°06′33″N 79°46′49″W	Greensboro	
10	Bumpas-Troy House	Bumpas-Troy House	December 6, 1977 (#77001000)	114 S. Mendenhall St. 36°04′20″N 79°48′12″W	Greensboro	
11	David Caldwell Log College Site	David Caldwell Log College Site	January 13, 1982 (#82003456)	Address Restricted	Greensboro	
12	Carolina Cadillac Company Building	Carolina Cadillac Company Building	August 25, 2014 (#14000520)	304 E. Market St. 36°04′19″N 79°47′12″W	Greensboro	
13	Carolina Casket Company	Carolina Casket Company	April 15, 2015 (#15000163)	812 Millis St. 35°56′54″N 80°00′59″W	High Point	
14	Wilbur and Martha Carter House	Wilbur and Martha Carter House	August 13, 2008 (#08000777)	1012 Country Club Dr. 36°05′56″N 79°48′32″W	Greensboro	
15	Central Fire Station	Central Fire Station	April 28, 1980 (#80002837)	318 N. Greene St. 36°04′33″N 79°47′29″W	Greensboro	
16	College Hill Historic District	College Hill Historic District	November 4, 1993 (#93001191)	Roughly bounded by W. Market St., S. Cedar St., Oakland Ave. and McIver St. 36°04′08″N 79°48′12″W	Greensboro	
17	Deep River Friends Meeting House and Cemetery		December 13, 1995 (#95001448)	5300 W. Wendover Ave. 36°01′53″N 79°57′55″W	High Point	
18	Dixon-Leftwich-Murphy House	Dixon-Leftwich-Murphy House	September 23, 1982 (#82003457)	507 Church St. 36°04′46″N 79°47′13″W	Greensboro	
19	Downtown Greensboro Historic District	Downtown Greensboro Historic District	June 17, 1982 (#82003458)	Elm, S. Davie, S. Green, and E. and W. Washington Sts.; also roughly bounded by Davie, North Elm, North and South Green, East and West Lewis, West Market, and West Washington Sts., East and West Friendly and Summit Aves., West Gate City Blvd, and Southern Railway right of way 36°04′07″N 79°47′25″W	Greensboro	Second set of addresses represent a boundary adjustment approved April 20, 2023.
20	James Benson Dudley Senior High School and Gymnasium	James Benson Dudley Senior High School and Gymnasium	April 11, 2003 (#03000302)	1200 Lincoln St. 36°03′35″N 79°45′54″W	Greensboro	
21	Endsley-Morgan House		October 25, 1984 (#84000117)	Off U.S. 421; 36°07′23″N 80°00′51″W	Colfax	
22	Enterprise Building	Enterprise Building	December 2, 2014 (#14000985)	305 N. Main St. 35°57′34″N 80°00′26″W	High Point	
23	William Fields House	William Fields House	December 5, 1985 (#85003084)	447 Arlington St. 36°03′54″N 79°47′21″W	Greensboro	
24	First Baptist Church	First Baptist Church	January 8, 2009 (#08001289)	701 E. Washington Dr. 35°57′41″N 79°59′59″W	High Point	
25	Fisher Park Historic District	Fisher Park Historic District	January 22, 1992 (#91002006)	Roughly bounded by Fisher and Bessemer Aves. and Wharton and Church Sts.; also 507 N. Church St. 36°04′59″N 79°47′26″W	Greensboro	507 Church represents a boundary increase of September 12, 1996
26	Former East White Oak School	Former East White Oak School	April 21, 1992 (#92000360)	1801 Tenth St. 36°06′04″N 79°45′37″W	Greensboro	
27	Former Jamestown High School	Former Jamestown High School	December 6, 1991 (#91001779)	200 W. Main St. 35°59′36″N 79°56′21″W	Jamestown	
28	Former Charles D. McIver School	Former Charles D. McIver School	April 3, 1992 (#92000177)	643 W. Gate City Boulevard; 36°03′47″N 79°48′04″W	Greensboro	Currently used as a church.
29	Former Pomona High School	Former Pomona High School	February 24, 1995 (#92001888)	2021 Spring Garden St. 36°03′47″N 79°49′48″W	Greensboro	
30	Former L. Richardson Memorial Hospital	Former L. Richardson Memorial Hospital	April 3, 1992 (#92000180)	603 S. Benbow Rd. 36°04′04″N 79°46′14″W	Greensboro	
31	Edward J. Forney House	Edward J. Forney House	April 21, 1992 (#92000359)	1402 Spring Garden St. 36°03′56″N 79°48′48″W	Greensboro	
32	Daniel P. Foust House		January 20, 2005 (#04001522)	439 Brightwood Church Rd. 36°04′40″N 79°34′48″W	Whitsett	
33	Julius I. Foust Building	Julius I. Foust Building	September 11, 1980 (#80002838)	1000 W. Spring Garden St. 36°04′01″N 79°48′29″W	Greensboro	
34	Foust-Carpenter and Dean Dick Farms		July 1, 2009 (#09000504)	East and west sides of Mt. Hope Church Rd. and north and south sides of Carpenter House Rd. 36°01′26″N 79°37′53″W	Whitsett	
35	John Marion Galloway House	John Marion Galloway House	July 21, 1983 (#83001886)	1007 N. Elm St. 36°05′11″N 79°47′24″W	Greensboro	
36	Gardner House		October 15, 1974 (#74001350)	East of Jamestown on SR 1383; 35°59′19″N 79°53′28″W	Jamestown	
37	Gibsonville School	Gibsonville School	August 18, 2014 (#14000495)	500 Church St. 36°06′33″N 79°32′39″W	Gibsonville	
38	Dr. C. S. Grayson House	Dr. C. S. Grayson House	March 17, 1994 (#94000190)	1009 N. Main St. 35°58′06″N 80°00′54″W	High Point	
39	Green Hill Cemetery Gatekeeper's House	Green Hill Cemetery Gatekeeper's House	May 29, 1979 (#79001713)	700 Battleground Ave. 36°04′47″N 79°47′43″W	Greensboro	
40	Greensboro Historical Museum	Greensboro Historical Museum	April 25, 1985 (#85000877)	130 Summit Ave. 36°04′32″N 79°47′17″W	Greensboro	
41	Greensboro Senior High School	Greensboro Senior High School	September 7, 2005 (#05000957)	801 Westover Terrace; 36°05′02″N 79°48′57″W	Greensboro	
42	Guilford College	Guilford College	June 21, 1990 (#90000855)	5800 W. Friendly Ave. 36°05′40″N 79°52′58″W	Greensboro	
43	Guilford County Courthouse	Guilford County Courthouse	May 10, 1979 (#79001714)	Market St. 36°04′20″N 79°47′34″W	Greensboro	
44	Guilford County Office and Court Building	Guilford County Office and Court Building	December 20, 1988 (#88002843)	258 S. Main St. 35°57′14″N 80°00′20″W	High Point	
45	Guilford Courthouse National Military Park	Guilford Courthouse National Military Park	October 15, 1966 (#66000069)	Address Restricted	Greensboro	
46	Guilford Mill	Guilford Mill	August 2, 1982 (#82003462)	Southeast of Oak Ridge on NC 68; 36°09′38″N 79°58′41″W	Oak Ridge	
47	John Haley House	John Haley House	August 26, 1971 (#71000587)	1805 E. Lexington Ave. 35°58′49″N 79°59′42″W	High Point	
48	Hardee Apartments	Hardee Apartments	March 14, 1991 (#91000260)	1102 N. Main St. 35°58′10″N 80°00′53″W	High Point	
49	High Point Schools Historic District		May 26, 2025 (#100013059)	701, 801, 851 Ferndale Boulevard; 35°57′29″N 80°01′17″W	High Point	
50	Highland Cotton Mills Village Historic District	Highland Cotton Mills Village Historic District	May 23, 2014 (#14000263)	Roughly bounded by W. Market Center Dr., Connor, Jordan & Young Pls., S. Elm St. 35°56′10″N 80°00′43″W	High Point	
51	Hillsdale Brick Store		June 14, 1982 (#82003459)	NC 150 and SR 2347; 36°12′00″N 79°50′39″W	Hillsdale	
52	Hillside	Hillside	February 1, 1980 (#80002839)	301 Fisher Park Circle; 36°04′32″N 79°47′34″W	Greensboro	
53	Holly Gate		September 22, 1980 (#80002840)	NC 61; 36°04′18″N 79°33′50″W	Whitsett	
54	Hoskins House Historic District	Hoskins House Historic District	March 15, 1988 (#88000175)	Intersection of New Garden Rd. and US 220; 36°07′47″N 79°51′08″W	Greensboro	
55	Charles H. Ireland House	Charles H. Ireland House	May 29, 1979 (#79001715)	602 W. Friendly Ave. 36°04′26″N 79°47′51″W	Greensboro	Destroyed by fire February 2, 1996
56	Irving Park Historic District	Irving Park Historic District	February 21, 1995 (#94001050)	Roughly bounded by Buffalo Cr., Battleground Ave., Cornwallis Dr. and W. Northwood St. 36°05′47″N 79°47′54″W	Greensboro	
57	Jamestown Historic District		January 22, 1973 (#73001345)	Both sides of U.S. 29A; 35°59′40″N 79°56′44″W	Jamestown	
58	Allen Jay School Rock Gymnasium	Allen Jay School Rock Gymnasium	August 28, 2012 (#12000574)	1201 E. Fairfield Rd. 35°55′33″N 79°57′38″W	High Point	
59	Jefferson Standard Building	Jefferson Standard Building	May 28, 1976 (#76001326)	Elm and Market Sts. 36°04′22″N 79°47′32″W	Greensboro	
60	Kellenberger Estate		March 17, 1994 (#94000218)	1415 Kellenberger Rd. 36°03′13″N 79°40′19″W	Greensboro	
61	Kilby Hotel	Kilby Hotel	April 22, 1982 (#82003460)	627 E. Washington St. 35°57′40″N 80°00′02″W	High Point	
62	Kimrey-Haworth House	Kimrey-Haworth House	March 14, 1991 (#91000265)	5307 W. Friendly Ave. 36°05′20″N 79°52′43″W	Greensboro	
63	O. Arthur Kirkman House and Outbuildings	O. Arthur Kirkman House and Outbuildings	January 28, 1988 (#87002567)	501 W. High St.; also 106 Oak St. 35°57′13″N 80°00′42″W	High Point	106 Oak represents a boundary increase of June 9, 1989
64	Latham-Baker House	Latham-Baker House	November 12, 1982 (#82001298)	412 Fisher Park Circle; 36°04′56″N 79°47′30″W	Greensboro	
65	Edward and Frances S. Loewenstein House		December 12, 2024 (#100011157)	2104 Granville Road; 36°06′14″N 79°47′39″W	Greensboro	
66	Low House		March 8, 1978 (#78001957)	South of Gibsonville; 36°02′59″N 79°34′13″W	Whitsett	
67	Lyndon Street Townhouses	Lyndon Street Townhouses	April 3, 1992 (#92000178)	195-201 Lyndon St. 36°04′16″N 79°47′07″W	Greensboro	
68	Magnolia Hotel		May 21, 2026 (#100013031)	442 Gorrell Street; 36°04′00″N 79°47′01″W	Greensboro	
69	Harden Thomas Martin House	Harden Thomas Martin House	December 19, 1985 (#85003217)	204 N. Mendenhall St. 36°04′28″N 79°48′09″W	Greensboro	
70	McCulloch's Gold Mill	McCulloch's Gold Mill	April 24, 1979 (#79001717)	Address Restricted	Jamestown	
71	Dr. Joseph A. McLean House	Dr. Joseph A. McLean House	February 2, 1995 (#94001632)	US 70 north side, 0.1 miles (0.16 km) west of junction with SR 3053; 36°04′15″N 79°37′54″W	Sedalia	
72	Melrose Hosiery Mill No. 1		November 3, 2020 (#100005749)	1533-1547 West English Rd., 105-109 SW Point Ave. 35°56′55″N 80°01′08″W	High Point	
73	Abigail, Ann, and Elihu Mendenhall House		November 14, 2025 (#100011736)	1106 Skeet Club Road; 36°02′14″N 80°01′02″W	High Point	
74	Richard Mendenhall Plantation Buildings	Richard Mendenhall Plantation Buildings	November 3, 1972 (#72000964)	U.S. Route 29; 35°59′34″N 79°56′56″W	Jamestown	
75	Minneola Manufacturing Company Cloth Warehouse	Minneola Manufacturing Company Cloth Warehouse	September 11, 2018 (#100002928)	108 E. Railroad Ave. 36°06′16″N 79°32′30″W	Gibsonville	
76	Minneola Manufacturing Company Mill		December 21, 2023 (#100009628)	106 Railroad Avenue; 36°06′21″N 79°32′38″W	Gibsonville	
77	Mock, Judson, Voehringer Company Hosiery Mill	Mock, Judson, Voehringer Company Hosiery Mill	March 28, 2011 (#11000141)	2610 Oakland Ave. 36°03′43″N 79°50′07″W	Greensboro	Textile mill built between 1927 and 1938
78	Model Farm		April 20, 2011 (#11000208)	2058 Brentwood St. 35°56′17″N 79°58′42″W	High Point	
79	Oak Ridge Military Academy Historic District	Oak Ridge Military Academy Historic District	March 17, 1983 (#83001887)	NC 150 and NC 68; 36°10′32″N 79°59′13″W	Oak Ridge	
80	Oakdale Cotton Mill Village	Oakdale Cotton Mill Village	March 15, 1976 (#76001327)	SR 1352 and SR 1144; 35°58′50″N 79°55′48″W	Jamestown	
81	Oakwood Historic District	Oakwood Historic District	February 7, 1991 (#90002197)	100-300 blocks Oakwood St. 35°57′22″N 80°00′48″W	High Point	
82	One Plaza Center		April 10, 2024 (#100010204)	101 S. Main Street; 35°57′26″N 80°00′20″W	High Point	
83	Palmer Memorial Institute Historic District	Palmer Memorial Institute Historic District	October 24, 1988 (#88002029)	Along US 70 west of the junction with NC 3056; 36°04′02″N 79°37′25″W	Sedalia	
84	William Penn High School	William Penn High School	November 16, 1978 (#78001959)	Washington Dr. 35°57′43″N 79°59′51″W	High Point	
85	Pickett Cotton Mills	Pickett Cotton Mills	September 1, 2015 (#15000558)	1200 Redding Dr. 35°56′34″N 80°01′00″W	High Point	
86	Pilot Life Insurance Company Home Office		July 27, 2022 (#100007970)	5300 High Point Rd. 36°01′22″N 79°53′05″W	Greensboro	
87	Proximity Print Works	Proximity Print Works	December 1, 2014 (#14000986)	1700 Fairview St. 36°06′04″N 79°46′20″W	Greensboro	
88	Ragsdale Farm		September 3, 1991 (#91001171)	404 E. Main St. 35°59′48″N 79°55′51″W	Jamestown	
89	Revolution Cotton Mills	Revolution Cotton Mills	March 1, 1984 (#84002324)	Roughly bounded by Southern RR, N. Buffalo Creek, Yanceyville and 9th Sts. 36°05′57″N 79°46′42″W	Greensboro	
90	Roberts Hall	Roberts Hall	August 11, 2025 (#100012089)	933 Roberts Hall Lane (High Point University); 35°58′19″N 79°59′36″W	High Point	
91	Thomas Scott House		July 12, 1984 (#84002328)	SR 1001; 36°10′06″N 79°47′28″W	Greensboro	
92	Shaw-Cude House		June 1, 1982 (#82003455)	Off SR 2010; 36°07′26″N 79°59′00″W	Colfax	
93	Sherrod Park		March 14, 1991 (#91000278)	200-300 blocks Woodrow Ave. 35°58′08″N 80°00′28″W	High Point	
94	Michael Sherwood House	Michael Sherwood House	January 31, 1978 (#78001958)	426 W. Friendly Ave. 36°04′26″N 79°47′43″W	Greensboro	
95	J. C. Siceloff House	J. C. Siceloff House	March 14, 1991 (#91000264)	1104 N. Main St. 35°58′10″N 80°00′54″W	High Point	
96	Francis Marion Smith House	Francis Marion Smith House	July 12, 1984 (#84002330)	204 Railroad Ave. 36°06′15″N 79°32′28″W	Gibsonville	
97	William Rankin and Elizabeth Wharton Smith House		February 27, 2007 (#07000091)	437 Brightwood Church Rd., NC 2758, 0.62 miles (1.00 km) north of US 70; 36°04′44″N 79°34′51″W	Whitsett	
98	South Benbow Road Historic District	South Benbow Road Historic District	December 9, 2024 (#100011158)	Roughly bounded by Julian Street and Ross Avenue at the north: US-29 (South O'Henry Boulevard) on the east; South side Boulevard, Britton and Curry Streets on the south: Dale, Larkin, and Logan Streets on the west: and extending west through the 1000 bloc 36°03′31″N 79°46′18″W	Greensboro	
99	South Greensboro Historic District	South Greensboro Historic District	December 20, 1991 (#91001812)	Roughly bounded by Gorrell, Martin, E. Bragg, Sevier, Omaha, Broad, Caldwell, Andrew, Vance, McCulloch, and King Dr. 36°03′40″N 79°47′06″W	Greensboro	
100	Sigmund Sternberger House	Sigmund Sternberger House	April 16, 1993 (#93000302)	712 Summit Ave. 36°04′52″N 79°46′44″W	Greensboro	
101	Summerfield Historic District		May 18, 2005 (#05000437)	4105-4210 Oak Ridge Rd. and 7702-7804 Summerfield Rd. 36°12′25″N 79°54′21″W	Summerfield	
102	Summerfield School Gymnasium and Community Center		August 28, 2012 (#12000575)	7515 Trainer Dr. 36°12′01″N 79°54′18″W	Summerfield	
103	Summit Avenue Historic District	Summit Avenue Historic District	August 5, 1993 (#93000768)	Roughly bounded by Chestnut, E. Bessemer, Cypress, Dewey, Park, and Percy Sts. 36°04′54″N 79°46′55″W	Greensboro	
104	Sunset Hills Historic District	Sunset Hills Historic District	January 17, 2013 (#12001179)	Bounded by W. Friendly, N. & S. Elam & W. Wright Aves., S. Tremont Dr., N. Aycock St. & Kensington Rd. 36°04′24″N 79°49′16″W	Greensboro	
105	Tabernacle Methodist Protestant Church and Cemetery	Tabernacle Methodist Protestant Church and Cemetery	March 10, 1995 (#95000231)	5601 Liberty Rd. 35°57′55″N 79°41′49″W	Greensboro	
106	Tanlea Woods		December 12, 2024 (#100011160)	2904 Wynnewood Drive; 36°06′49″N 79°48′42″W	Greensboro	
107	A. E. Taplin Apartment Building	A. E. Taplin Apartment Building	March 1, 1996 (#96000196)	408 W. Parkway Ave. 35°58′03″N 80°01′11″W	High Point	
108	Tomlinson Chair Manufacturing Company Complex	Tomlinson Chair Manufacturing Company Complex	March 17, 1983 (#83001888)	305 W. High St. 35°57′18″N 80°00′33″W	High Point	
109	Union Cemetery	Union Cemetery	October 21, 1993 (#93001142)	900 blook S. Elm St. 36°03′31″N 79°47′29″W	Greensboro	
110	United States Post Office and Court House	United States Post Office and Court House	October 29, 2014 (#14000886)	324 W. Market St. 36°04′24″N 79°47′37″W	Greensboro	
111	Uptown Suburbs Historic District	Uptown Suburbs Historic District	January 9, 2013 (#12001158)	Roughly bounded by W. Lexington & Sunset Aves., Westchester Dr., Johnson & W. Ray Sts. 35°58′09″N 80°01′23″W	High Point	
112	Wadsworth Congregational Church		December 31, 2002 (#02001659)	1301 Rock Creek Dairy Rd. 36°02′49″N 79°35′52″W	Whitsett	
113	Wafco Mills	Wafco Mills	May 30, 1979 (#79001716)	801 McGee St. 36°04′07″N 79°47′56″W	Greensboro	
114	Simeon Wagoner House	Simeon Wagoner House	September 3, 1991 (#91001172)	5838 NC 61 (Friedens Church Rd.); 36°07′31″N 79°33′31″W	Gibsonville	
115	Washington Street Historic District	Washington Street Historic District	December 28, 2010 (#10001094)	Portions of eight blocks on Washington, Centennial, Fourth, and Hobson Sts., Eccles Pl., and Gaylord Ct. 35°57′40″N 80°00′08″W	High Point	
116	Dr. David P. Weir House	Dr. David P. Weir House	July 12, 1984 (#84002332)	223 N. Edgeworth St. 36°04′28″N 79°47′48″W	Greensboro	
117	West High Street Historic District	West High Street Historic District	April 12, 2007 (#07000295)	407, 409, 415, 501, 503, and 507 W. High St., and 106, 107, and 110 Oak St. 35°57′20″N 80°00′41″W	High Point	
118	West Market Street Methodist Episcopal Church, South	West Market Street Methodist Episcopal Church, South	December 19, 1985 (#85003198)	302 W. Market St. 36°04′25″N 79°47′36″W	Greensboro	
119	White Oak New Town Historic District	White Oak New Town Historic District	April 3, 1992 (#92000176)	2400-2418 N. Church, 2312-2509 Spruce, 2310-2503 Hubbard and 2401-2503 Cypress Sts. 36°06′23″N 79°46′45″W	Greensboro	
120	Whitsett Historic District		May 5, 1999 (#99000532)	Junction NC 61 and NC 3064; 36°04′06″N 79°33′49″W	Whitsett	
121	James H. and Anne B. Willis House	James H. and Anne B. Willis House	April 23, 2015 (#15000181)	707 Blair St. 36°05′38″N 79°48′13″W	Greensboro	
122	Lucy and J. Vassie Wilson House	Lucy and J. Vassie Wilson House	May 4, 2005 (#05000378)	425 Hillcrest Dr. 35°58′19″N 80°01′38″W	High Point	
123	F. W. Woolworth Company Building	F. W. Woolworth Company Building	December 13, 2024 (#100011389)	134 S. Elm Street; 36°04′18″N 79°47′25″W	Greensboro	Site of the Greensboro sit-ins; now a museum.
124	World War Memorial Stadium	World War Memorial Stadium	April 12, 2001 (#01000377)	510 Yanceyville St. 36°04′47″N 79°46′38″W	Greensboro	

== Former listing ==
	Name on the Register	Image	Date listed	Date removed	Location	City or town	Description
1	Founders Hall		1973 (#73002237)	1974	55800 W Friendly Ave.	Greensboro	Demolished in 1973

== See also ==
- National Register of Historic Places listings in North Carolina
- List of National Historic Landmarks in North Carolina
