= Kellenberger =

Kellenberger is a surname. Notable people with the surname include:

- Emil Kellenberger (1864–1943), Swiss sports shooter
- Jakob Kellenberger (born 1944), Swiss diplomat
- James Kellenberger (born 1938), American philosopher

== See also ==
- Kellenberger Estate, a historic estate in North Carolina, U.S.
