= Sherwood House =

Sherwood House may refer to:

- Physician Residences of the Irene Byron Tuberculosis Sanatorium, also known as the Draper-Sherwood Houses, Allen County, Indiana
- James Noble Sherwood House, Plainwell, Michigan
- Gurnee–Sherwood House, Wesley Hills, New York
- Sherwood House (Yonkers, New York)
- Michael Sherwood House, Greensboro, North Carolina
