= Pomona High School =

Pomona High School may refer to one of the following:

- Former Pomona High School, Greensboro, North Carolina
- Pomona Catholic High School, Pomona, California
- Pomona High School (Pomona, California), Pomona, California
- Pomona High School (Arvada, Colorado), Arvada, Colorado
- Pomona High School (Pomona, Kansas), Pomona, Kansas
- Noosa District State High School, Pomona, Queensland, Australia
