= Hardinge, Inc. =

American machine tool manufacturer

- Company type: Private
- Headquarters: Berwyn, PA, United States
- Products: Machine Tools
- Website: www.hardinge.com

Hardinge, Inc. is a multi-national machine tool builder with global headquarters in Berwyn, PA, USA. It began operation in 1890. Hardinge is best known for its lathes, both non-CNC and CNC.

Hardinge Inc. machine tool brands now include Hardinge, Bridgeport, Kellenberger, Usach, Hauser, Jones & Shipman, Voumard, and Tschudin. It currently has locations in the United States, England, Germany, Switzerland, China, Taiwan and India.

On May 29, 2018, Privet Fund Management LLC completed the acquisition of Hardinge, Inc. for approximately $245 million.

On July 29, 2024, Hardinge filed for Chapter 11 bankruptcy protection, blaming Chinese regulators who cancelled plans to sell its Chinese operations as part of the decision. The company will sell itself to affiliates of Centre Lane Partners. The sale was completed on September 19, 2024.

The company employs approximately 1500 staff.
