= Carolina Casket Company =

Historic building in North Carolina, US

- U.S. National Register of Historic Places
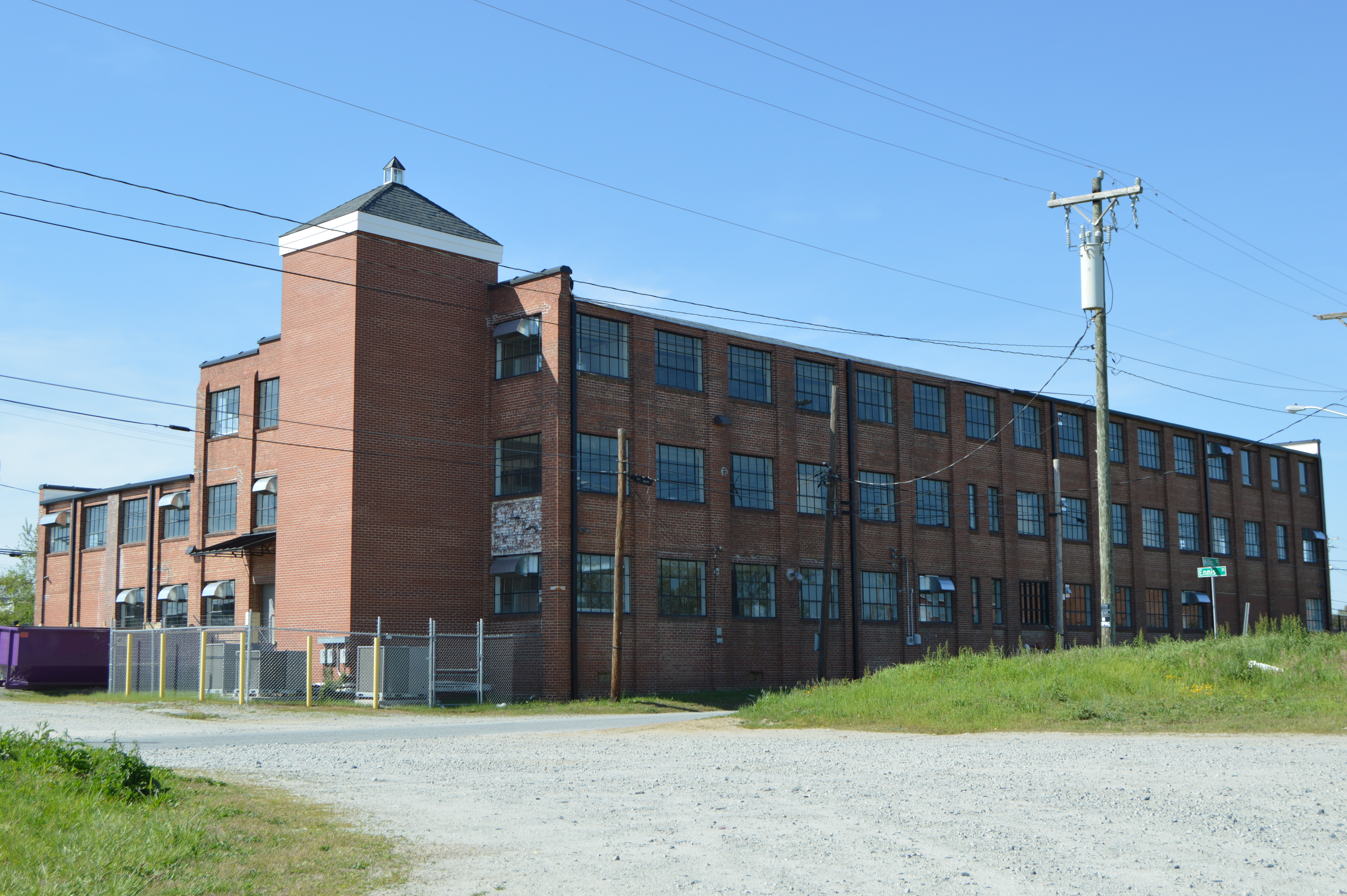
- Front and southern end

- Location within North Carolina Location within the United States
- Location: 812 Millis St., High Point, North Carolina
- Coordinates: 35°56′54″N 80°1′0″W
- Area: 1.7 acres (0.69 ha)
- NRHP reference No.: 15000163
- Added to NRHP: April 15, 2015

The Carolina Casket Company is a historic industrial property at 812 Millis Street in High Point, North Carolina. The main building on the property is a large three-story L-shaped building, framed in heavy timber and clad in brick. Its main wing is sixteen bays long, the bays separated by brick pilasters with corbelled caps. It was built in 1929 by the Carolina Casket Company, which began as the Rankin Coffin and Casket Company in the early 20th century. The company operated on the premises until about 1940, when it went bankrupt. The building was thereafter occupied for many years by the Carrick Turning Works, a maker of wooden furniture parts.

The property was listed on the National Register of Historic Places in 2015.

== See also ==
- National Register of Historic Places listings in Guilford County, North Carolina
