= Magnolia House =

- U.S. National Register of Historic Places
- Location within North Carolina Location within the United States
- Location: 442 Gorrell Street, Greensboro, North Carolina
- Coordinates: 36.0665°N 79.7836°W
- Architectural style: Victorian-Italianate
- Part of: South Greensboro Historic District (ID91001812)
- NRHP reference No.: 100013031

Significant dates
- Added to NRHP: May 21, 2026
- Designated: December 20, 1991

Magnolia House at 442 Gorrell Street in Greensboro, North Carolina is a Victorian-Italianate-style house which was listed as Magnolia Hotel in the Green Book as a hotel for African American travelers. It is one of the four remaining Green Book sites in North Carolina. It was listed on the National Register of Historic Places in 1991 as a contributing structure to South Greensboro Historic District and was individually listed on the National Register in 2026.

The house is open for lunch three days a week and hosts events.

== History ==
John W. and Annie Reed bought the house for $1300 when it was new in 1889. It was built by John Donnell Jr. at a time when white people lived in the area. Insurance maps show a three-story tower, and a nearby house on Pearson street has the same floor plan. John Reed ran a grocery store on Elm Street which experienced significant water damage from a nearby fire in 1890. His wife died the same year but the house remained in the family, rented to her parents Dr. Calvin and Caroline Graves, among others.

Although he rented it for only a short time, the house was named DeButts House for Capt. Daniel DeButts. John and Nina Plott bought the house in 1914. It is believed that Andrew Leopold Schlosser added stonework using Mount Airy granite. The house experienced significant damage from the 1936 Greensboro tornado.

== The business ==
Arthur Gist, a bricklayer and World War I veteran, and his wife, seamstress Louise "Louie" Gist, bought the house in 1949. They converted the house into a bed and breakfast. Themselves Black Americans, their clientele was generally wealthier Black travelers. The Greensboro City Directory called the tourist home Magnolia House as recently as 1968. It offered "distinguished and upscale accommodations."

Aurthur Gist died in 1980, and the business was closed. However, their son Herman Gist lived in the house until his death in 1994. Herman Gist's wife Grace Gist sold it to Sam Pass in 1996. The Pass family has restored the house. In 2018, Pass' daughter, nurse Natalie Pass-Miller, took over ownership from her father.

At some point the address changed from 438 to 442, meaning some history was overlooked for years.

=== The Gist family ===
Arthur and Louise "Louie" Gist had three children. Their eldest son, Herman Gist, became a state legislator. Their other son Arthur "Buddy" Gist Jr. worked with Miles Davis and Jackie Robinson. He also founded both Mt. Kilimanjaro Coffee Company and Mt. Kenya Coffee Company, which later merged into African Blend Gourmet Coffee Company. Annie Lou Gist was their youngest child; she graduated from Bennett College and in 1956 for her Ph.D. from the New York University School of Education. Annie Lou Gist was also active in the NAACP and in fighting for civil rights.

=== Restoration ===
Both Sam Pass and Natalie Pass-Miller have dedicated themselves to restoring Magnolia House. It reopened as a boutique hotel in January 2022. Since the civil rights movements of the 1960s removed segregation in the hospitality industry and generally obviated the need for overnight lodgings for traveling African Americans, the Magnolia House had not served as a hotel. It did function as a boarding house for a while.

Much of the historical record of the site has been lost. Part of the original sign is inside, and a replica of the sign has been added outside. Without interior photos of the space from its first stint as a motel, research into interior design practices of the 1950s has guided some of the aesthetic choices.

Melissa Knapp is the historic site manager and curator for Magnolia House. Under her guidance, the site received a $3,667 Catalyzing Creativity Grant, from the City of Greensboro's office of arts and culture. The grant allowed them to partner with the Interior Architecture and Computer Science departments at University of North Carolina Greensboro; students in these departments created a virtual reality tour of the site as it looked at different times across the mid-20th century. The project was also partially funded by the National Park Service's African American Civil Rights Grant Program.

=== Famous guests ===
The Magnolia House was a destination for wealthier Black Americans as they traveled. According to Donald Trapp, a minister in town, the lodgings were almost always full. The site had a marquee out front that announced famous people who was staying there at the time. Among the more famous guests were James Brown, Ike and Tina Turner, Ray Charles, Martin Luther King Jr., Robinson, and Satchel Paige. Others included Sam Cooke, Gladys Knight, Lionel Hampton, Louis Armstrong, Count Basie, Lena Horne, Five Blind Boys of Alabama, Joe Tex, and James Baldwin.

=== Honors ===
The Magnolia House became one of nine North Carolina hotels, and one of over 300 in the United States, listed in Historic Hotels of America. Lawrence Horwitz, executive vice president of Historic Hotels of America, praised the "exemplary stewardship of this historically significant hotel."

The magnolia House was named to the National Register of Historic Places "for its significance as a Green Book resource".
