= James H. and Anne B. Willis House =

Historic house in North Carolina, United States

- U.S. National Register of Historic Places
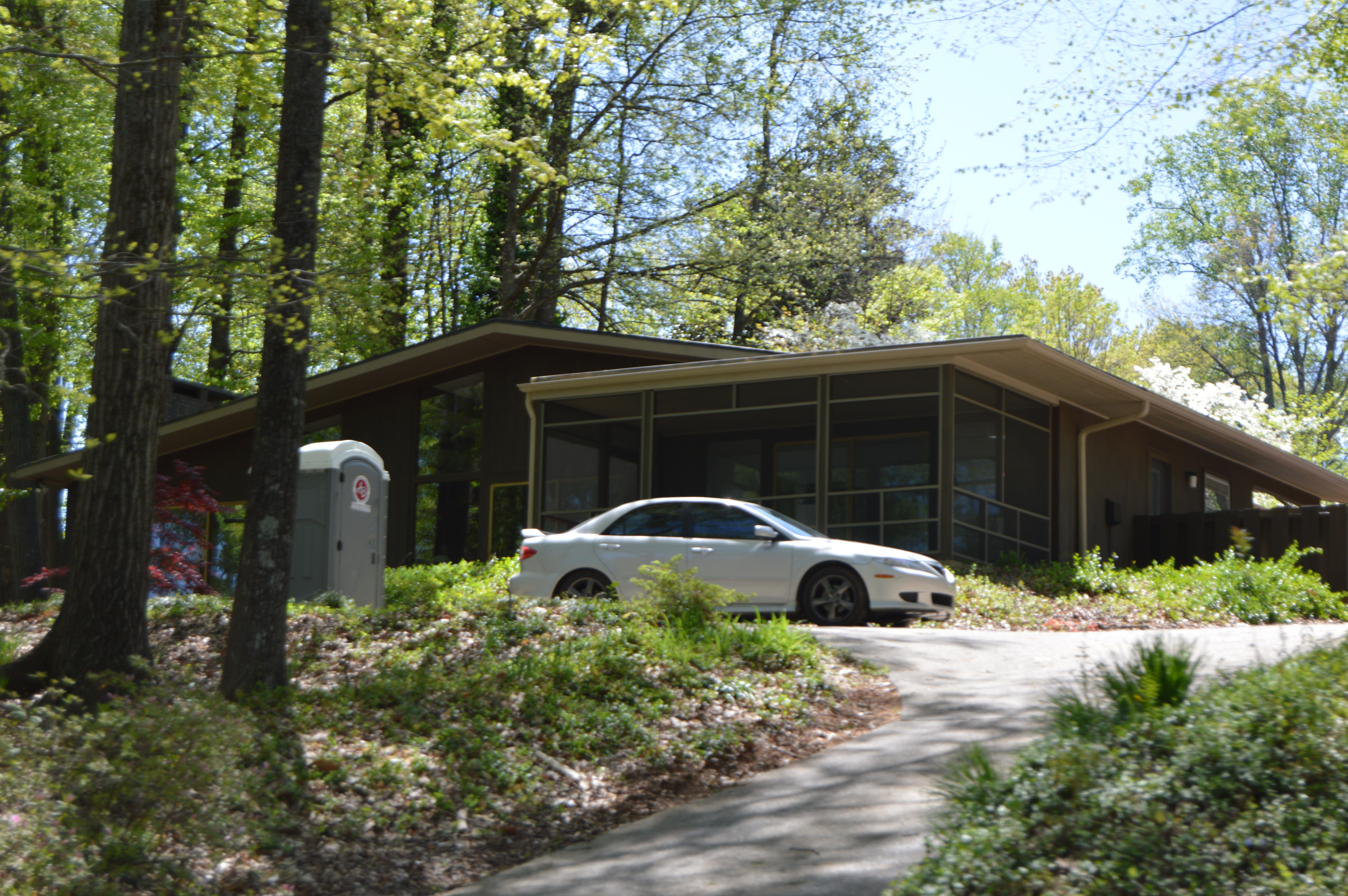
- Front

- Location within North Carolina Location within the United States
- Location: 707 Blair St., Greensboro, North Carolina
- Coordinates: 36°5′38″N 79°48′13″W
- Built: 1965
- NRHP reference No.: 15000181
- Added to NRHP: April 23, 2015

The James H. and Anne B. Willis House is a historic house at 707 Blair Street in Greensboro, North Carolina. It is a single story Modernist structure, laid out in a T shape with a gabled roof. The north facade, facing Blair Street, has a large plate glass window, while the main entrance is on the shorter west side, sheltered by a shed-roof porch. The exterior has a variety of finishes, including vertical cypress board and brick veneer, and plate glass windows and smaller sash windows are used in variety around the exterior. The house was built in 1965, and is an important Modernist work of the local architectural firm of Loewenstein-Atkinson.

The house was listed on the National Register of Historic Places in 2015.

== See also ==
- National Register of Historic Places listings in Guilford County, North Carolina
