= Mock, Judson, Voehringer Company Hosiery Mill =

- U.S. National Register of Historic Places
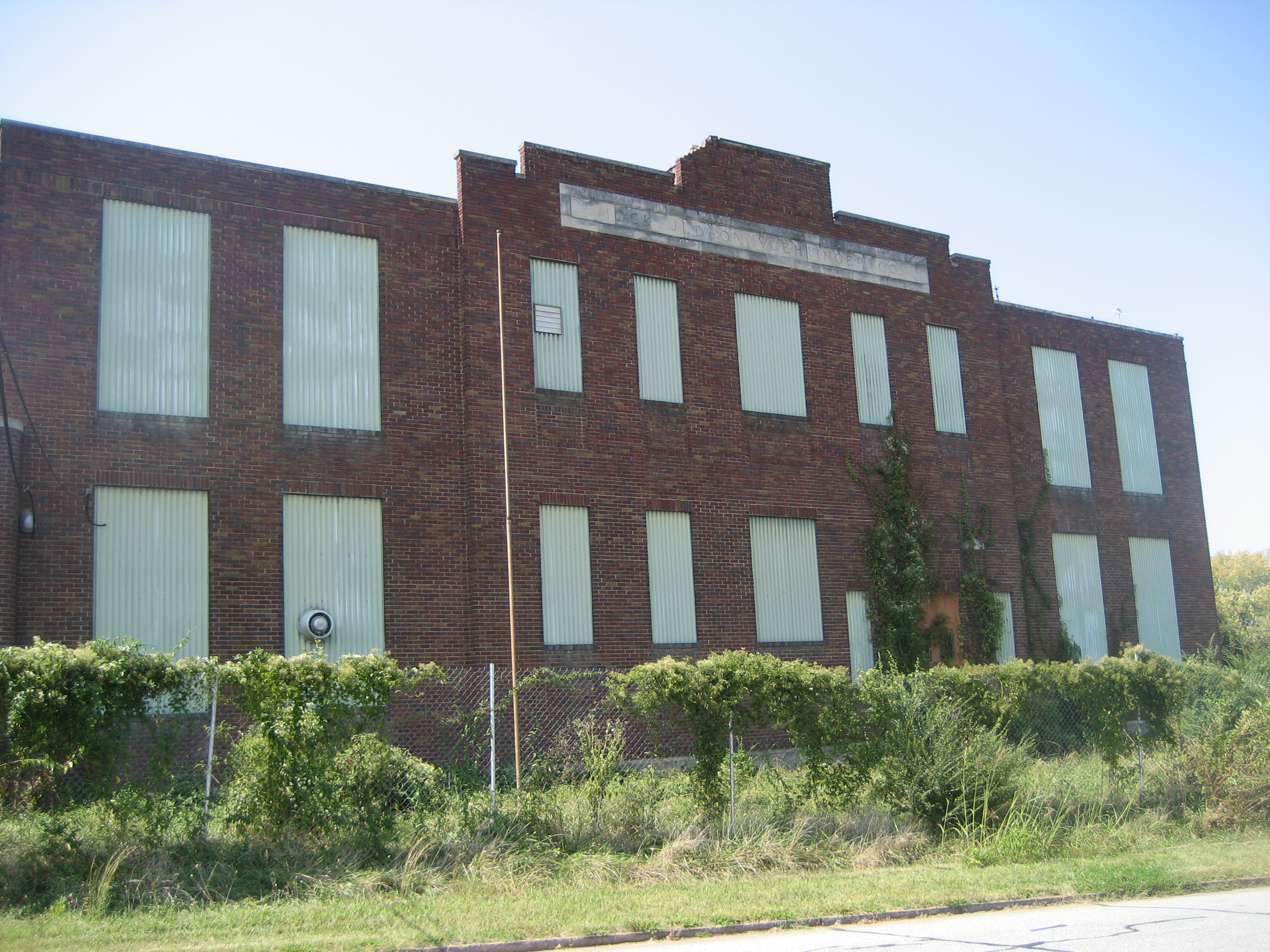
- Mock, Judson, Voehringer Company Hosiery Mill, September 2012

- Location within North Carolina Location within the United States
- Location: 2610 Oakland Ave., Greensboro, North Carolina
- Coordinates: 36°3′43″N 79°50′7″W
- Area: 8.76 acres (3.55 ha)
- Built: 1927, 1928, 1930, 1936, 1938
- NRHP reference No.: 11000141
- Added to NRHP: March 28, 2011

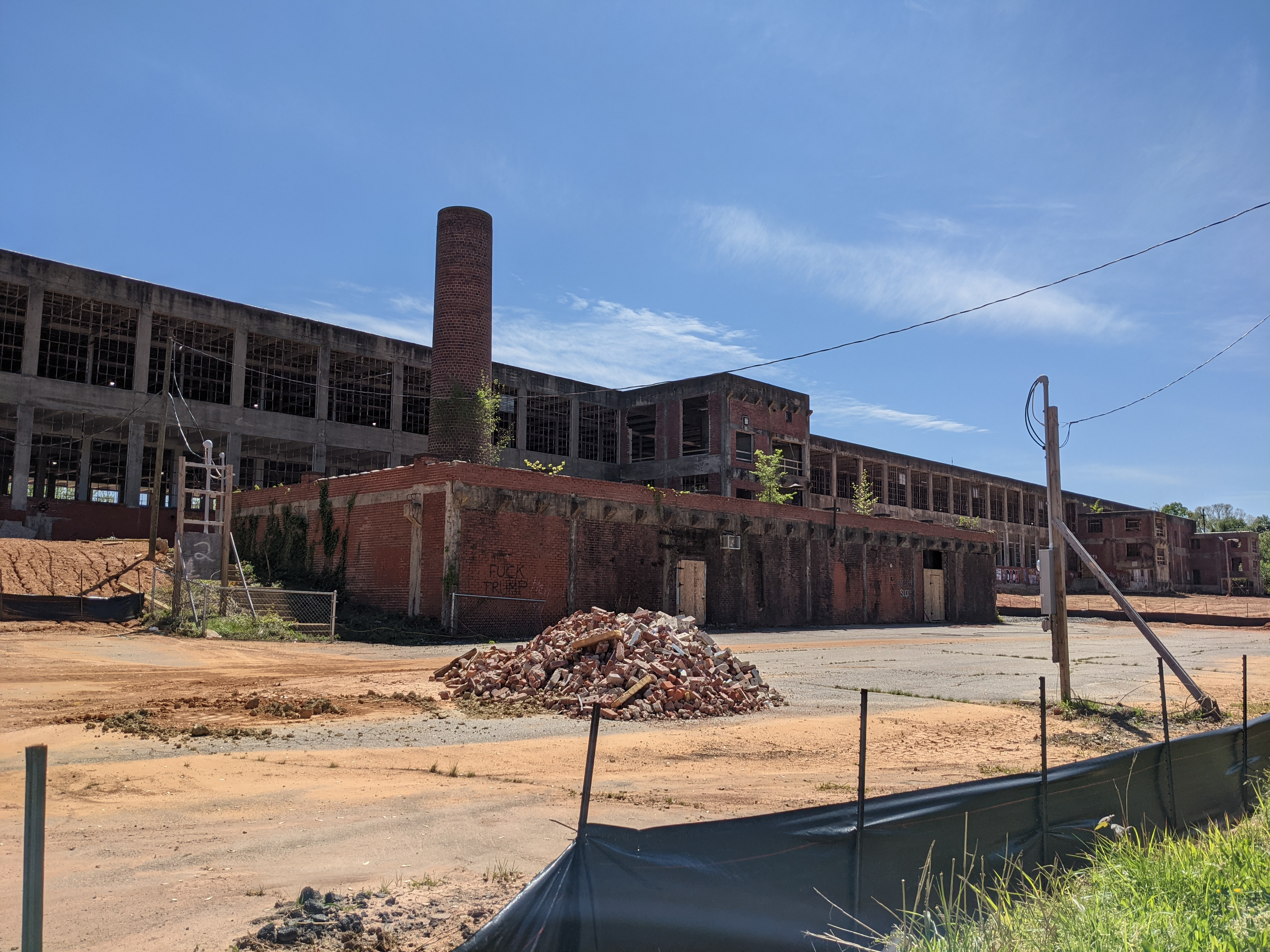
Mock, Judson, Voehringer Company Hosiery Mill, May 2021

Mock, Judson, Voehringer Company Hosiery Mill, also known as MoJud Hosiery Company and Rolane Factory Outlet Store, is a former hosiery production plant located at 2610 Oakland Avenue in Greensboro, Guilford County, North Carolina. The company was founded in 1926, and operated until 1972. The plant was then shut down, except for a small portion used as an outlet store, until its final complete shutdown in 1999. The plant was listed on the National Register of Historic Places in 2011.

== Founding and growth ==
Founded in 1926 by Bernard Mock, Nathaniel Judson and John K. Voehringer, the Mock, Judson, Voehringer Company of NC, Inc was formed for hosiery production. Following industrialists such as the Cone Family, the MJV Company built a production facility at 2610 Oakland Avenue, formerly 1004 Howard street, in 1927. Starting with 14 original employees, by 1929 they had increased to 600 workers and were producing four million pairs of silk hosiery annually. The complex had also grown from its original 10,000 square feet to roughly 140,000. The factory continued producing hose all throughout its history until production stopped in 1972, including during World War 2. However, during the war, they switched from producing nylon and silk hose to rayon, but this was quickly reversed after nylon shortages ended after the conclusion of wartime rationing.

== Worker housing and benefits ==
Unlike other textile corporations, such as the Cone mills, who would not begin to pull away from providing worker housing until the Great Depression, MJV did not have mill villages. Directories from the time period have indicated that employees were taking advantage of a local booming housing economy and lived in the surrounding areas of Lindley and Highland Park. MJV also provided an on-site nurse, a cafeteria for their employees, and a recreational baseball team, the Mojuds Nighthawks.

== Labor disputes ==
In 1937, two years after the passing of the National Labor Relations Act of 1935, the American Federation of Hosiery Workers filed charges against MJV claiming that the mill had engaged in unfair labor practices including the distribution of anti-union literature, firing employees on the basis of union membership, and removal of organizers attempting to distribute union literature outside of the facility.

== National Register of Historic Places ==
The facility is listed in the National Register of Historic Places listings in Guilford County, North Carolina. In early 2018, it was announced that the structure would be converted to 170 apartments, including several townhouses while retaining many historical elements of the original building. As of May 2021, no significant work has begun on the project. On April 21, 2022, Capitol Broadcasting Company of Raleigh, North Carolina purchased the site for $7.6 million for apartment development.

After massive renovations winter of 2023, opened as MoJud Lofts.
