= William Thornton Whitsett =

American academic (1866–1934)

- Born: August 5, 1866; Guilford County, North Carolina
- Died: March 22, 1934 (aged 67); Whitsett, North Carolina

Academic background
- Education: Ph.D., North Carolina College
- Alma mater: University of North Carolina Chapel Hill; North Carolina College

Academic work
- Discipline: Education
- Institutions: Fairview Academy, Whittsett Institute

William Thornton Whitsett (August 5, 1866 – March 22, 1934) was an American educator, poet, author, historian, and genealogist. He was the founder of the Whitsett Institute, an academy for the education of young men in Guilford County, North Carolina. The town of Whitsett grew up around the institute.

== Early life ==
William Thornton Whitsett was born in 1866 in Guilford County, North Carolina. Whitsett was the only son of Thomas Bason and Mary Foust Whitsett. He was taught by private tutors and attended both public and private schools. He graduated with a BA in History from the University of North Carolina in 1888 and earned a Ph.D. in English from North Carolina College in Mt. Pleasant, North Carolina in 1893.

== Career ==
=== Educator ===
He immediately went to work as the Principal of Fairview Academy in Guilford County. He was inspired by the work of previous educators, including Brantley York, the founder of what would become Duke University, who had attempted to found boys' schools in the same area. Fairview Academy became Whitsett Institute, a boarding school for boys, and was very successful until it was destroyed by fire in 1918. While it was in operation, it averaged between 200 and 250 boys in attendance and taught liberal arts, business, and teacher preparatory classes. The institute was the first school in North Carolina to accept students from Cuba and the first to enroll Cuban students in the University of North Carolina.

While engaged in managing and promoting Whitsett Institute, he also became actively involved in promoting education in North Carolina. He served as secretary of the North Carolina Teachers Assembly, as a Trustee of the University of North Carolina from 1897 until 1919 as the secretary of the Association of Academies of North Carolina, was a member of the American Academy of Social and Political Sciences of Philadelphia, and President of the Guilford County School Board.

=== Poet and author ===
Whitsett published his first work, a collection of poems titled Saber and Song in 1917. He also wrote book reviews for various newspapers as well as articles encouraging authors.

=== Historian and genealogist ===
He also published numerous monographs on the history and genealogy of Guilford County and Alamance County, churches in North Carolina, and the genealogy of early North Carolina families. He served as official historian for both Guilford and Alamance counties. He received an honorary Doctor of Letters from Lenoir-Rhyne College in 1933. He was a member of the Southern Historical Association, Washington, D. C. and The American Authors Guild, New York.

== See also ==
- Whitsett, William Thornton. Saber and song : a book of poems. Whitsett, N.C.: Whitsett Institute. 1917. https://archive.org/details/saberandsongabo00whitgoog.
- Whitsett, William Thornton. History of Brick church and the Clapp family, Greensboro, N.C.: Harrison Printing Company. https://archive.org/details/historyofbrickch02whit.
- Whitsett, William Thornton. Frieden's Lutheran Church. Gibsonville, N.C.: [W.B. Miller]. 1921. https://archive.org/details/friedenslutheran00whit.
- Whitsett, William Thornton, Founders of Church and State, Greensboro, N.C. : Harrison Printing Company http://divinityarchive.com/bitstream/handle/11258/8117/foundersofchurch03whit.pdf
- Blue, Frank Smith (Rev.); and Whitsett, William T. "Church Year Book History and Directory of Stoney Creek (1776), Shiloh (1913), Burlington Second (1913) Presbyterian Churches." Burlington, NC: [Rev. Frank S. Blue]. 1933. (Portrait of William T. Whitsett)
- J. H. Joyner, "Men of Mark in North Carolina," in Charles L. Van Noppen Papers (Manuscripts Department, Duke University Library, Durham).
- William Thornton Whitsett Papers (portraits) (Southern Historical Collection, University of North Carolina Library, Chapel Hill).
