= West Market Street United Methodist Church =

Historic church in North Carolina, United States

West Market St. United Methodist Church
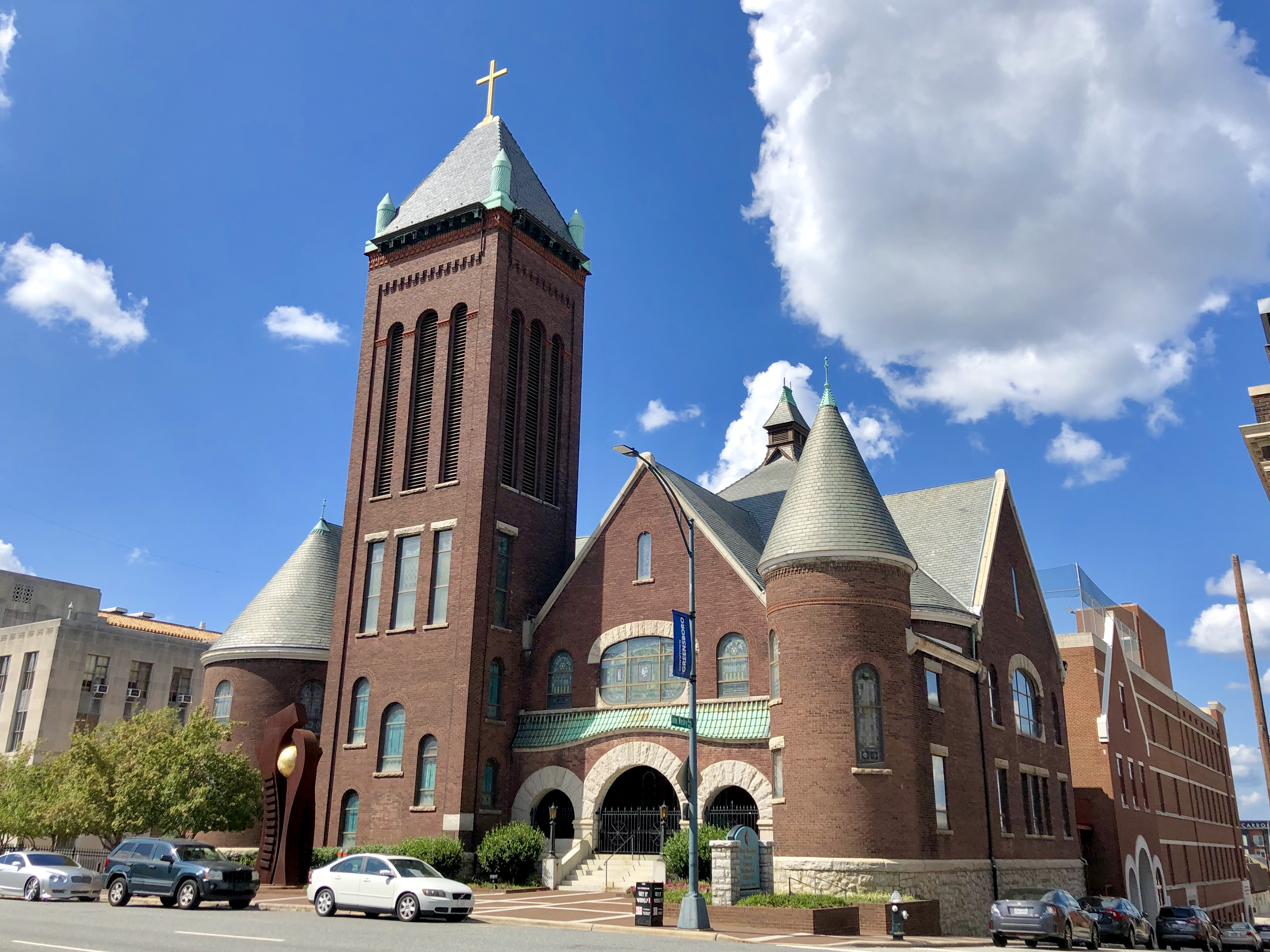
- West Market Street United Methodist Church, September 2019

Religion
- Affiliation: United Methodist Church
- District: Northern Piedmont District of the Western North Carolina Annual Conference
- Ecclesiastical or organisational status: Episcopal polity
- Leadership: Kenneth H. Carter, Jr.

Location
- Location: Greensboro, North Carolina, United States
- Interactive map of West Market St. United Methodist Church

Architecture
- Designated as NHL: National Register of Historic Places
- West Market Street Methodist Episcopal Church, South
- U.S. National Register of Historic Places
- Location within North Carolina Location within the United States
- Location: 302 W. Market St., Greensboro, North Carolina
- Coordinates: 36°4′25″N 79°47′36″W
- Area: 1 acre (0.40 ha)
- Built: 1893
- Architect: Foulk, S.W.
- Architectural style: Romanesque, Richardsonian Romanesque
- NRHP reference No.: 85003198
- Added to NRHP: December 19, 1985

West Market Street United Methodist Church (WMSUMC) is a church.in downtown Greensboro, North Carolina. It was constructed between 1893 and 1898; it was the third church built by the congregation.

== History ==
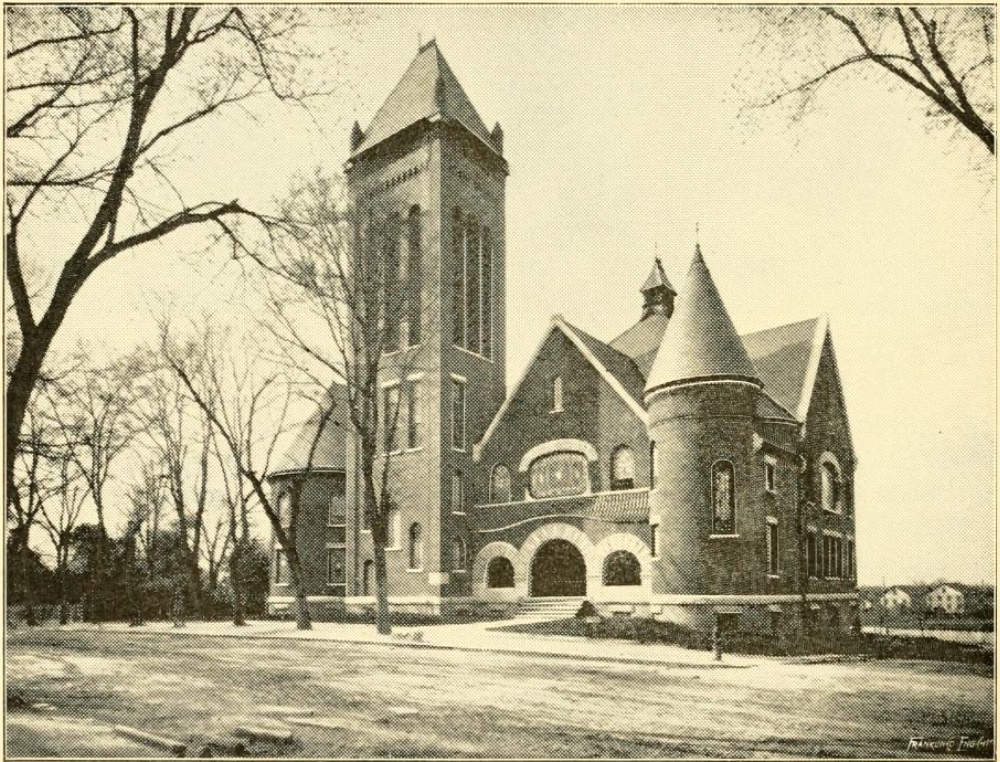
The church in 1903

The congregation of West Market Street United Methodist Church dates back to a group of Methodists living in Greensboro and holding services at the Greensboro Male Academy on Sycamore Street in the 1820s, 12 years after the founding of Greensboro. Reverend Peter Doub, who had been recently assigned to the Guildford Circuit, encouraged this group of Methodists to build a church in 1830. The cornerstone for a sanctuary was laid on August 14, 1830, and by 1831, the building was completed. It was initially known as the Greensboro Methodist Episcopal Church and was the first church building in the small village of Greensboro. The congregation consisted of 64 members at this time, 46 of whom were white and 18 of whom were black.

A church on West Market Street was completed in 1851.

Another church was completed in 1898. Windows from the German pavilion of the World's Columbian Exposition were used.
