= Wilbur and Martha Carter House =

Historic house in North Carolina, United States

- U.S. National Register of Historic Places
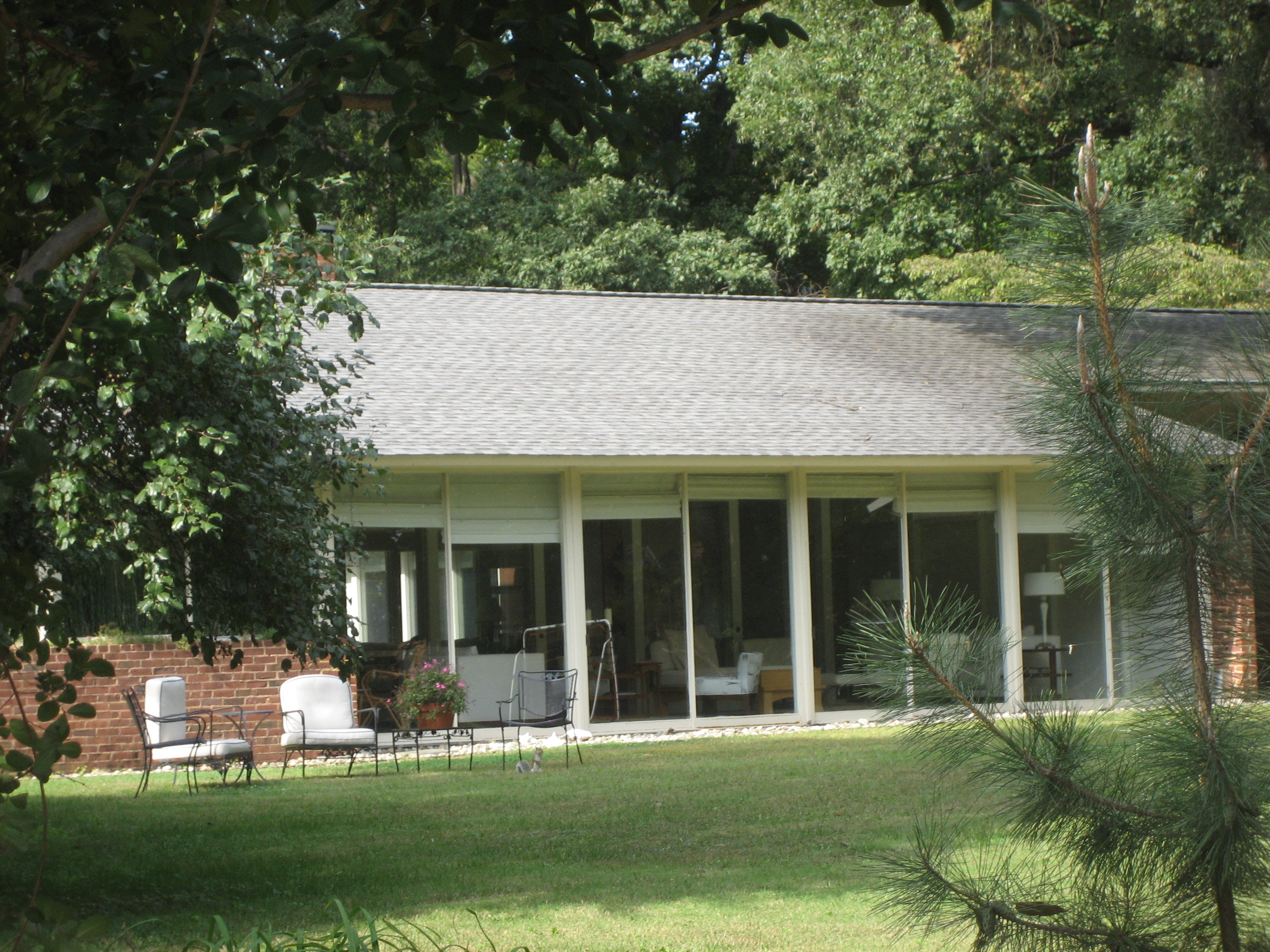
- Wilbur and Martha Carter House, September 2012

- Location within North Carolina Location within the United States
- Location: 1012 Country Club Dr., Greensboro, North Carolina
- Coordinates: 36°5′54″N 79°48′33″W
- Area: 1.3 acres (0.53 ha)
- Built: 1951
- Architect: Loewenstein, Edward; et al.
- Architectural style: Modern Movement
- NRHP reference No.: 08000777
- Added to NRHP: August 13, 2008

Wilbur and Martha Carter House is a historic home located at Greensboro, Guilford County, North Carolina. It was built in 1951 and is a one-story, "L"-plan, Modern Movement style dwelling. It consists of two gable-roofed intersecting wings and features a carport, recessed entrance, and massive brick chimney. The finishes include native bluestone, red brick, and wormy chestnut siding. The house shows the influence of Frank Lloyd Wright’s Usonian type. Also on the property are a contributing horse barn and shed.

It was listed on the National Register of Historic Places in 2008.
