= Kimrey-Haworth House =

Historic house in North Carolina, United States

- Kimrey--Haworth House
- U.S. National Register of Historic Places
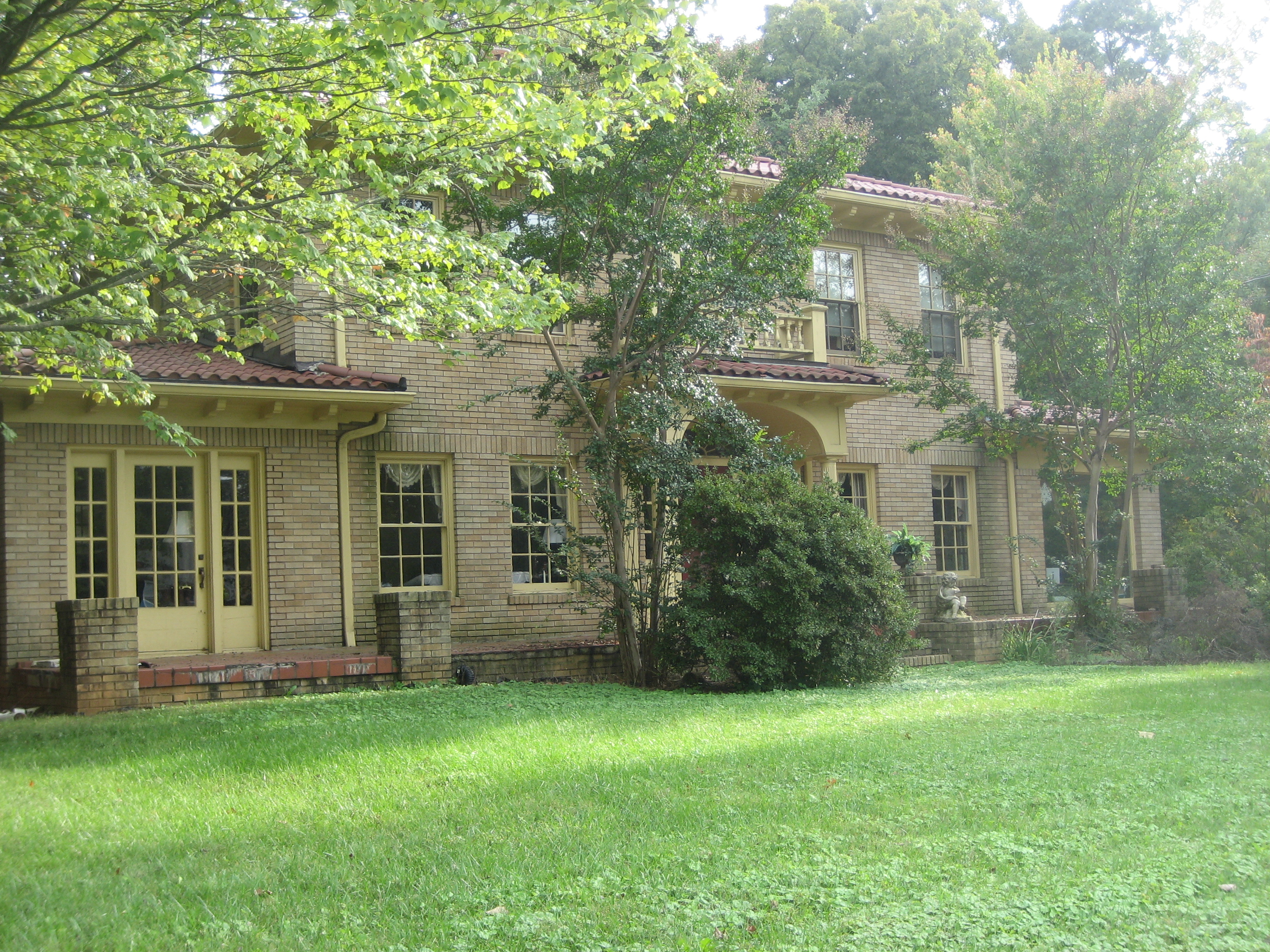
- Kimrey-Haworth House, September 2012

- Location within North Carolina Location within the United States
- Location: 5307 W. Friendly Ave., Greensboro, North Carolina
- Coordinates: 36°5′20″N 79°52′43″W
- Area: 0.8 acres (0.32 ha)
- Built: c. 1925
- Architectural style: Renaissance, Italian Renaissance
- NRHP reference No.: 91000265
- Added to NRHP: March 14, 1991

Kimrey-Haworth House is a historic home located at Greensboro, Guilford County, North Carolina. It was built about 1925, and is a two-story, five bay by three bay, frame dwelling in the Renaissance Revival-style faced with brick. It has a hipped roof covered by rounded Spanish-style red tiles, a brick chimney, and deep overhanging eaves. The front facade features a one-story wooden segmental arched portico supported by wooden Doric order columns. Also on the property is a contributing complementary garage.

It was listed on the National Register of Historic Places in 1991.
