= Minneola Manufacturing Company Cloth Warehouse =

Historic mill complex in North Carolina, US

- U.S. National Register of Historic Places
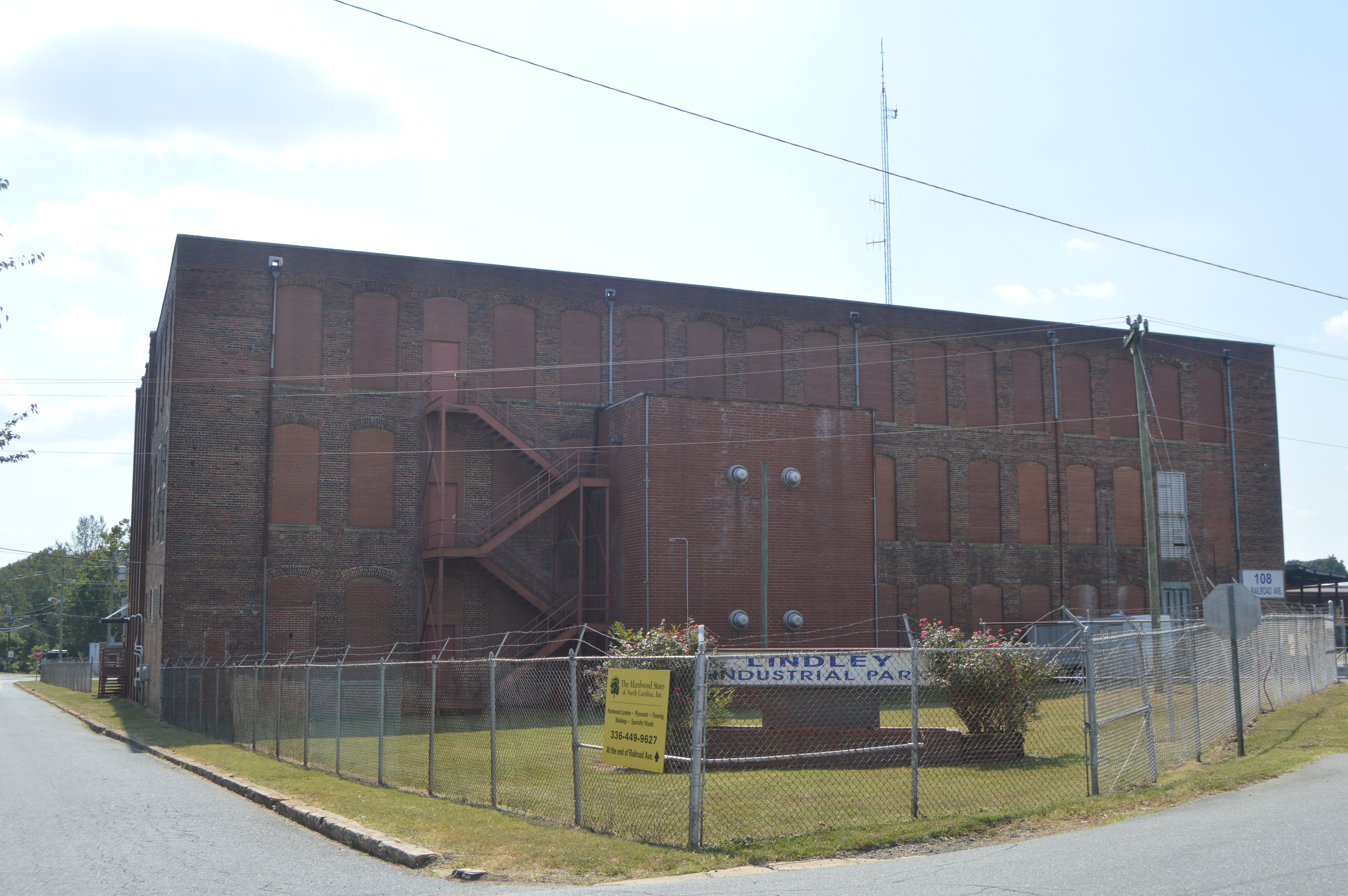

- Location within North Carolina Location within the United States
- Location: 108 E. Railroad Ave., Gibsonville, North Carolina
- Coordinates: 36°6′16″N 79°32′30″W
- Area: 1.3 acres (0.53 ha)
- Built: 1907
- NRHP reference No.: 100002928
- Added to NRHP: September 11, 2018

Minneola Manufacturing Company Cloth Warehouse (originally known as Minneola Cotton Mill Cloth Warehouse) is a historic mill complex in Gibsonville, Guilford County, North Carolina.

== History ==
The complex is a single building, three-story, rectangular brick warehouse built in 1907. The warehouse was doubled in size in 1935 with the erection of a three-story brick expansion to the south of the original block. On the south elevation, the firm added a one-story brick packing room and loading dock in 1953. On the north elevation, a tiny two-story brick addition with bathrooms was constructed in 1977.

In 2018, it got listed on the National Register of Historic Places.
