= Charles H. Ireland House =

Historic house in North Carolina, United States

- U.S. National Register of Historic Places
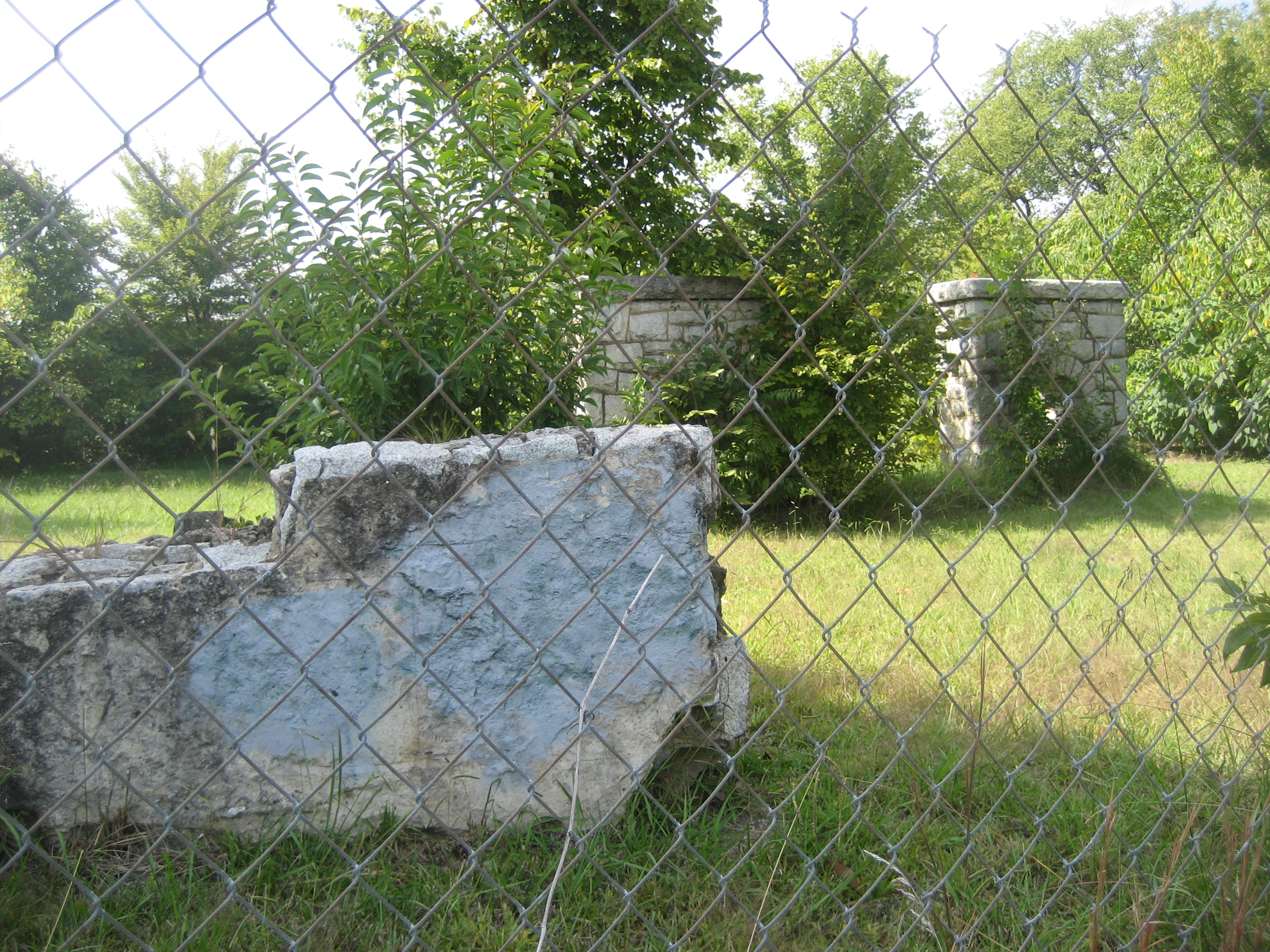
- Charles H. Ireland House site, September 2012

- Location within North Carolina Location within the United States
- Location: 602 W. Friendly Ave., Greensboro, North Carolina
- Coordinates: 36°4′26″N 79°47′51″W
- Area: less than one acre
- Built: 1904
- Built by: Schlosser, Andrew L.
- Architectural style: Colonial Revival, Classical Revival, Queen Anne
- NRHP reference No.: 79001715
- Added to NRHP: May 29, 1979

Charles H. Ireland House was a historic home located at Greensboro, Guilford County, North Carolina. It was built in 1904, and was a large 2 1/2-story, three-bay, granite, brick, and frame structure with Colonial Revival, Classical Revival and Queen Anne style design elements. It featured a pedimented two-story portico with Ionic order columns and a steeply pitched gambrel roof. It was destroyed by fire February 2, 1996.

It was listed on the National Register of Historic Places in 1979.
