= Dr. David P. Weir House =

Historic house in North Carolina, United States

- U.S. National Register of Historic Places
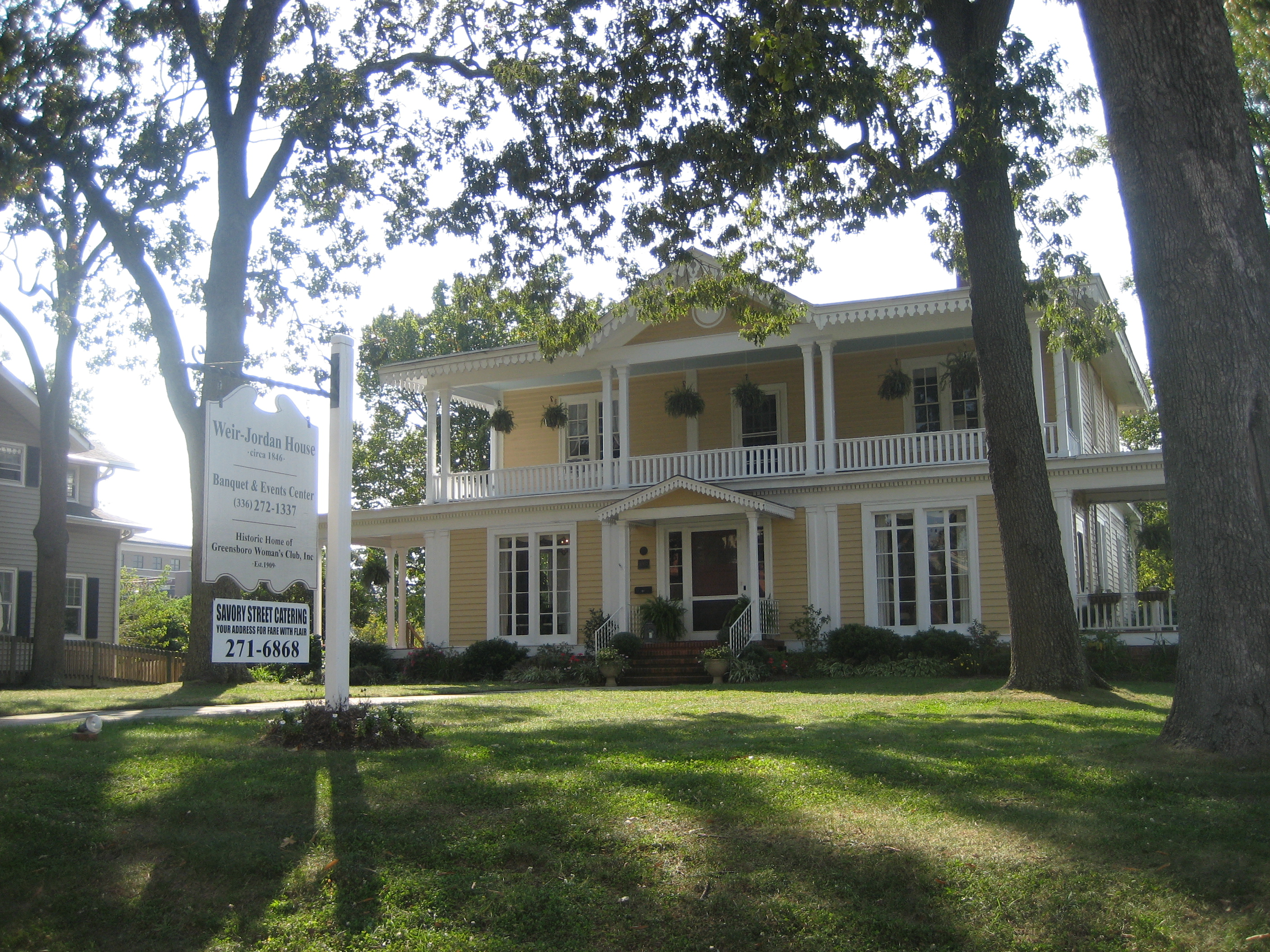
- Dr. David P. Weir House, September 2012

- Location within North Carolina Location within the United States
- Location: 223 N. Edgeworth St., Greensboro, North Carolina
- Coordinates: 36°4′28″N 79°47′48″W
- Area: less than one acre
- Built: c. 1846
- Architect: Alexander Jackson Davis
- Architectural style: Greek Revival, Italianate
- NRHP reference No.: 84002332
- Added to NRHP: July 12, 1984

Dr. David P. Weir House is a historic home located at Greensboro, Guilford County, North Carolina. It was built about 1846, and is a two-story, frame structure with Greek Revival and Italianate style design elements. It has a low hip roof pierced by two interior chimneys and a one-story kitchen wing. The house was expanded in 1961 by created a large meeting space at the front of the house for the Greensboro Woman's Club. The house may have been built from a plan provided by the well-known New York architect Alexander Jackson Davis.

It was listed on the National Register of Historic Places in 1984.
