= James Kellenberger =

American philosopher

- Born: 1938 (age 87–88)

Philosophical work
- Era: 21st-century philosophy
- Region: Western philosophy
- Institutions: California State University, Northridge
- Main interests: ethics, political philosophy

James Kellenberger is an American philosopher and Emeritus Professor of Philosophy at California State University, Northridge. He is known for his works on moral theory.

== Books ==
- Religious Discovery, Faith, and Knowledge, 1972
- The Cognitivity of Religion: Three Perspectives, 1985
- God-Relationships with and without God, 1989
- (ed.) Inter-Religious Models and Criteria, 1993
- Relationship Morality, 1995
- Kierkegaard and Nietzsche: Faith and Eternal Acceptance, 1997
- Moral Relativism, Moral Diversity, and Human Relations, Penn State University Press, 2001
- Introduction to Philosophy of Religion, Taylor & Francis, 2017
- God's Goodness and God's Evil, SUNY Press, 2019
