= Pickett Cotton Mills =

Historic building in North Carolina, US

- U.S. National Register of Historic Places
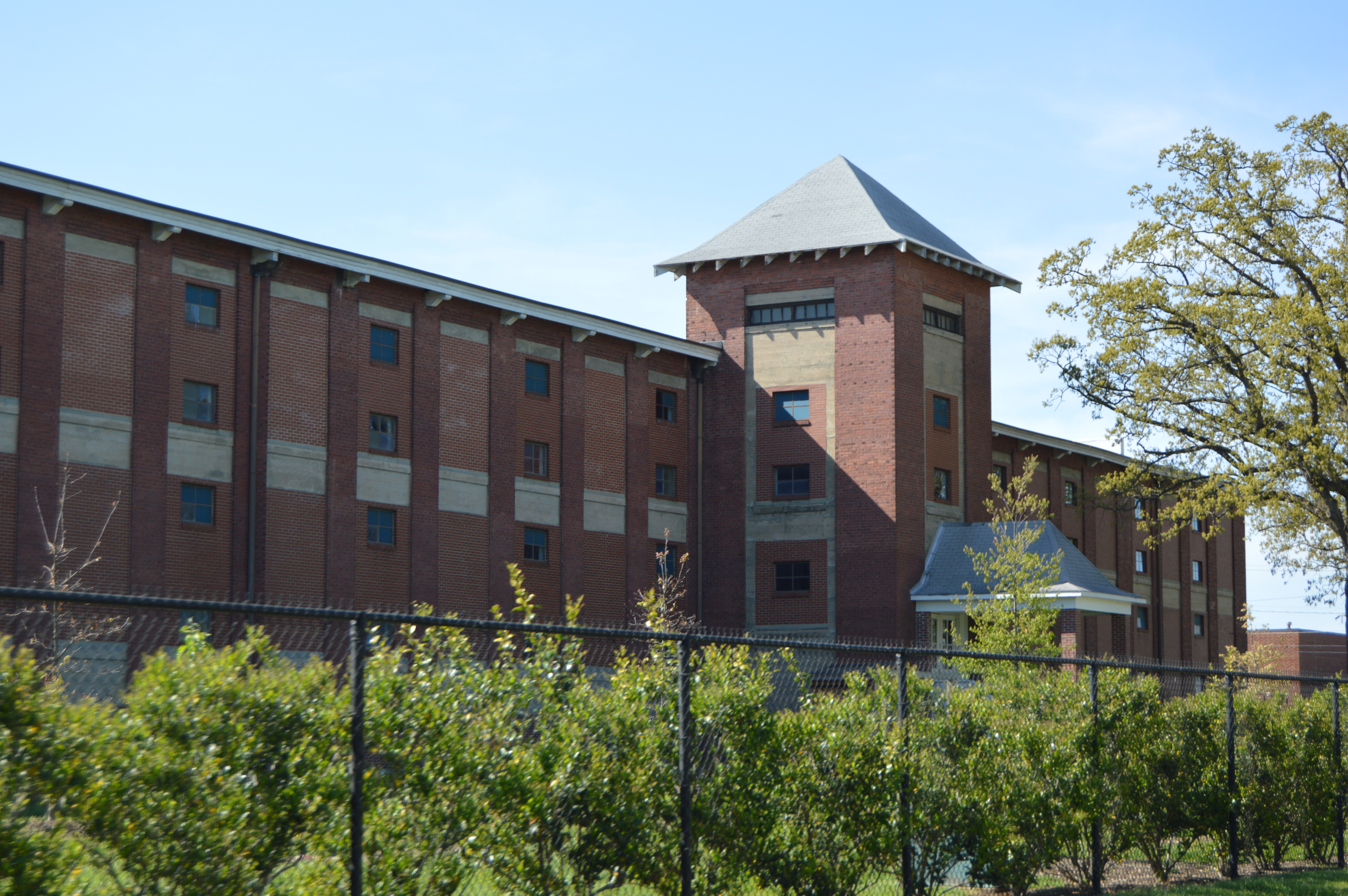
- Facade

- Location within North Carolina Location within the United States
- Location: 1200 Redding Dr., High Point, North Carolina
- Coordinates: 35°56′34″N 80°1′0″W
- Area: 5.54 acres (2.24 ha)
- Built: 1911
- NRHP reference No.: 15000558
- Added to NRHP: September 1, 2015

The Pickett Cotton Mills is a historic industrial property at 1200 Redding Drive in southwestern High Point, North Carolina. The mill complex includes the original 1911 two-story brick-and-concrete mill building, a storage warehouse, office building, and sprinkler house. The Pickett Cotton Mill Company was founded in 1910, and was the first successful textile operation in the city. The mill was closed in 1985 due to stiff foreign competition. The main mill is an exemplary instance of sturdy, high-quality construction of the period, and the office building, which is also typical of the period, is one of the few to survive.

The mill property was listed on the National Register of Historic Places in 2015.
