= Charles Benbow House =

Historic house in North Carolina, United States

- U.S. National Register of Historic Places
- Location within North Carolina Location within the United States
- Location: S of Oak Ridge on NC 150, near Oak Ridge, North Carolina
- Coordinates: 36°4′15″N 79°37′54″W
- Area: 131 acres (53 ha)
- Architectural style: Greek Revival, Georgian, Federal
- NRHP reference No.: 82004842
- Added to NRHP: August 19, 1982

Charles Benbow House is a historic home located near Oak Ridge, Guilford County, North Carolina. It was built sometime after 1814, and consists of a two-story, three-bay main brick block and a one-story, three-bay brick wing. The house incorporates Georgian, Federal, and Greek Revival style design elements and embodies stylistic elements of Quaker architecture.

It was listed on the National Register of Historic Places in 1982.
