= Wadsworth Congregational Church =

Historic church in North Carolina, United States

- U.S. National Register of Historic Places
- Location within North Carolina Location within the United States
- Location: 1301 Rock Creek Dairy Rd., near Whitsett, North Carolina
- Coordinates: 36°2′49″N 79°35′52″W
- Area: 1 acre (0.40 ha)
- Built: 1885
- Architectural style: Gothic
- NRHP reference No.: 02001659
- Added to NRHP: December 31, 2002

Wadsworth Congregational Church is a historic African-American Congregational church located near Whitsett, Guilford County, North Carolina. It was built about 1885, and is a one-story, five-bay, rectangular Gothic Revival style frame building. The small projecting vestibule supports a bell tower.

It was listed on the National Register of Historic Places in 2002.
