= Whitsett, North Carolina =

- Town
- Whitsett Town Hall

- Location in Guilford County and the state of North Carolina.
- Coordinates: 36°04′42″N 79°34′19″W
- Country: United States
- State: North Carolina
- County: Guilford
- Founded: 1884
- Named for: Whitsett Institute

Area
  - Total: 2.61 sq mi (6.76 km^{2})
  - Land: 2.58 sq mi (6.69 km^{2})
  - Water: 0.027 sq mi (0.07 km^{2})
- Elevation: 689 ft (210 m)

Population (2020)
  - Total: 584
  - Density: 226/sq mi (87.3/km^{2})
- Time zone: UTC-5 (Eastern (EST))
  - Summer (DST): UTC-4 (EDT)
- ZIP code: 27377
- Area code: 336
- FIPS code: 37-73760
- GNIS feature ID: 2406883
- Website: www.whitsettnc.com

Whitsett is a town in Guilford County, North Carolina, United States. The population was 584 at the 2020 census.

== History ==
The Daniel P. Foust House, Foust-Carpenter and Dean Dick Farms, Holly Gate, Low House, William Rankin and Elizabeth Wharton Smith House, Wadsworth Congregational Church, and Whitsett Historic District are listed on the National Register of Historic Places.

In 2012, Lenovo announced it would open a manufacturing plant in Whitsett.

== Geography ==
According to the United States Census Bureau, the town has a total area of 2.8 square miles (7.3 km^{2}), all land.

== Demographics ==
Historical population
| Census | Pop. | Note | %± |
|---|---|---|---|
| 2000 | 686 | | — |
| 2010 | 590 | | −14.0% |
| 2020 | 584 | | −1.0% |
| 2022 (est.) | 593 | ▲ | 1.5% |
U.S. Decennial Census

As of the census of 2000, there were 686 people, 279 households, and 215 families residing in the town. The population density was 243.4 inhabitants per square mile (94.0/km^{2}). There were 308 housing units at an average density of 109.3 per square mile (42.2/km^{2}). The racial makeup of the town was 93.29% White, 5.98% African American, 0.15% Asian, and 0.58% from two or more races. Hispanic or Latino of any race were 0.73% of the population.

There were 279 households, out of which 26.9% had children under the age of 18 living with them, 64.5% were married couples living together, 7.2% had a female householder with no husband present, and 22.9% were non-families. 20.8% of all households were made up of individuals, and 8.6% had someone living alone who was 65 years of age or older. The average household size was 2.46 and the average family size was 2.82.

In the town, the population was spread out, with 20.4% under the age of 18, 6.6% from 18 to 24, 27.0% from 25 to 44, 28.7% from 45 to 64, and 17.3% who were 65 years of age or older. The median age was 42 years. For every 100 females, there were 100.0 males. For every 100 females age 18 and over, there were 97.8 males.

The median income for a household in the town was $44,250, and the median income for a family was $48,750. Males had a median income of $38,958 versus $26,250 for females. The per capita income for the town was $21,936. About 5.5% of families and 7.5% of the population were below the poverty line, including 14.3% of those under age 18 and 4.2% of those age 65 or over.
