= William Rankin and Elizabeth Wharton Smith House =

Historic house in North Carolina, United States

- U.S. National Register of Historic Places
- Location within North Carolina Location within the United States
- Location: 437 Brightwood Church Rd., NC 2758, 0.62 miles (1.00 km) north of US 70, near Whitsett, North Carolina
- Coordinates: 36°4′44″N 79°34′51″W
- Area: 2 acres (0.81 ha)
- Built: c. 1846, c. 1854, c. 1885
- Architectural style: Greek Revival, Coastal Cottage
- NRHP reference No.: 07000091
- Added to NRHP: February 27, 2007

William Rankin and Elizabeth Wharton Smith House is a historic home located near Whitsett, Guilford County, North Carolina. It consists of a one-story, side-gable-roofed, hall-parlor dwelling built about 1846, with a room added about 1854, and two-room ell with a full-length porch to the rear about 1885. The Coastal Cottage form dwelling has Greek Revival style design elements. The house was moved to its present location, about 6/10th of a mile from its original site, in June 2005.

It was listed on the National Register of Historic Places in 2007.
