= Whitsett Historic District (Whitsett, North Carolina) =

Historic district in North Carolina, United States

- U.S. National Register of Historic Places
- U.S. Historic district
- Location within North Carolina Location within the United States
- Location: Jct. NC 61 and NC 3064, Whitsett, North Carolina
- Coordinates: 36°12′25″N 79°54′21″W
- Area: 65 acres (26 ha)
- Built: 1919
- Architectural style: Colonial Revival, Queen Anne, et al.
- NRHP reference No.: 99000532
- Added to NRHP: May 5, 1999

Whitsett Historic District is a national historic district located at Whitsett, Guilford County, North Carolina. The district encompasses 38 contributing buildings, 1 contributing site, and 5 contributing structures in the crossroads village of Whitsett. The contributing resources were built between 1894 and 1921, and developed around the Whitsett Institute, that operated from 1884 to 1919. Located in the district and separately listed is Holly Gate. Other notable buildings include the Queen Anne / Colonial Revival style "The Oaks", the John Rankin House, the Captain Dick House, the Wimbish-Tayler House, the Jefferson Lamb Houses, the Swift-Wheeler House, and the 1894 Charles T. Mason House and Dormitory.

It was listed on the National Register of Historic Places in 1999.
