= Wafco Mills =

- U.S. National Register of Historic Places
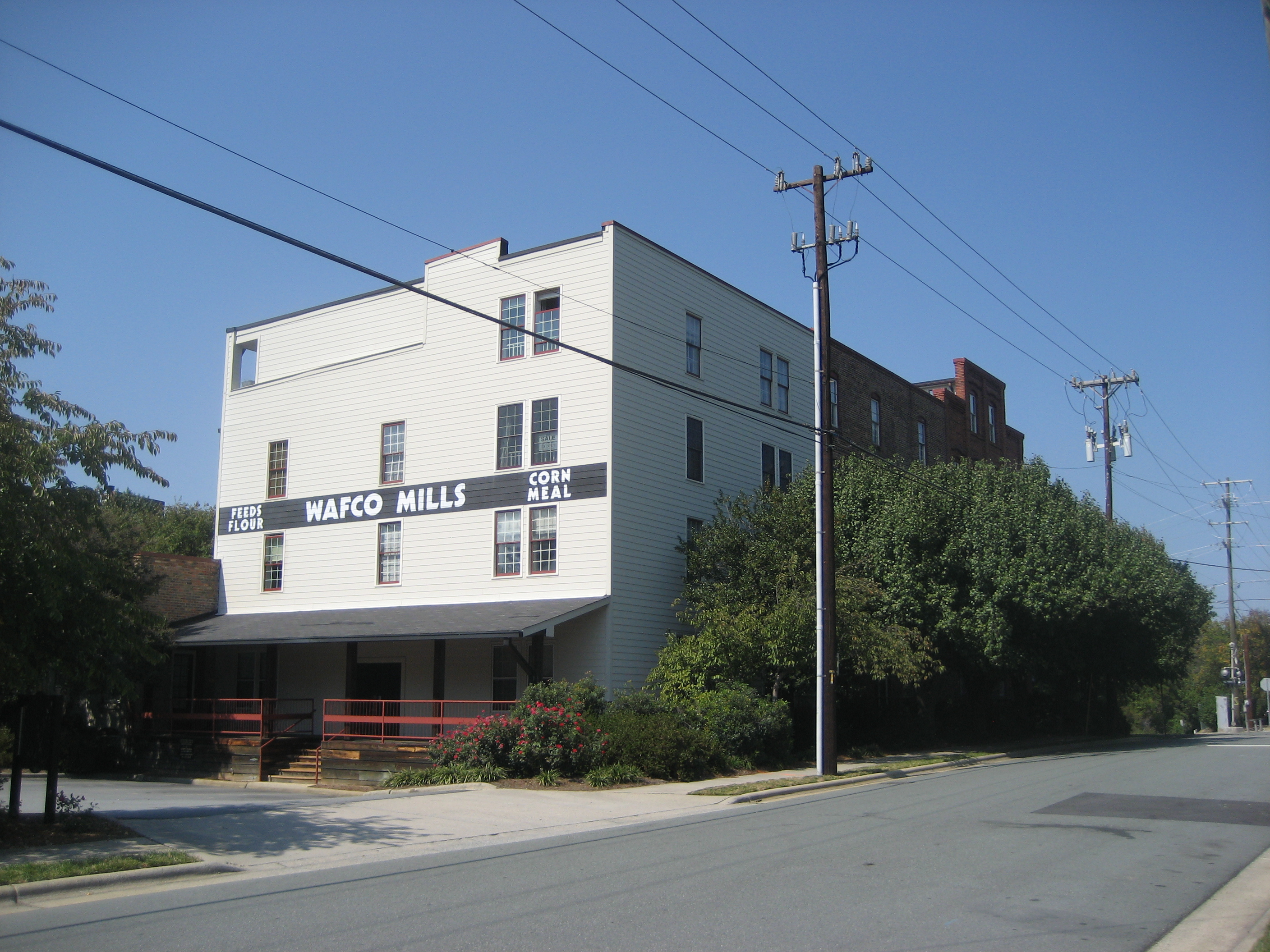
- Wafco Mills, September 2012

- Location within North Carolina Location within the United States
- Location: 801 McGee St., Greensboro, North Carolina
- Coordinates: 36°4′7″N 79°47′56″W
- Area: less than one acre
- Built: 1893, 1907, 1912
- Architect: North, Watson & Company
- NRHP reference No.: 79001716
- Added to NRHP: May 30, 1979

Wafco Mills is a historic roller mill complex located in Greensboro, Guilford County, North Carolina. The complex consists of a four-story frame building built in 1893 and expanded in 1941, with two four-story brick buildings built in 1907 and 1912. At the time of its listing the mill retained most of the original machinery. The mill closed as a business in 1972 and was converted to 28 residential condominiums in 1987. The mill is currently managed by the Historic Wafco Mills Condominium Association.

This historic property was originally constructed as the home of the milling enterprise North, Watson and Company. The earliest component of the complex is three stories tall, constructed of timber and covered in wood clapboards in 1893. Subsequent phases added in 1907 and 1912 were of brick construction and increasingly elaborate design. The 1912 phase is the most elaborate, featuring segmental arched windows, brick corbels, and a stepped parapet gable.

The history of the mill is associated with the Watson family. The mill produced a variety of flour, cornmeal and feeds and operated under the same family management for more than four generations.

The complex was abandoned in 1972, leaving its future in doubt until developers proposed converting the buildings to residential use in 1984. Architects preserved charming features and materials including exposed brick walls and structural timbers. They created twenty-eight unique living units that were instantly successful. Wafco Mills is a touchstone to the industrial and commercial development of Greensboro as a well-preserved example of late nineteenth and early twentieth century industrial construction development. Its collection of milling machinery remained largely intact at the time of Greensboro's most interesting residences.

It was listed on the National Register of Historic Places in 1979 and designated a Guilford County Landmark Property in 1995.
