= Carolina Cadillac Company Building =

Historic commercial building in North Carolina, US

- U.S. National Register of Historic Places
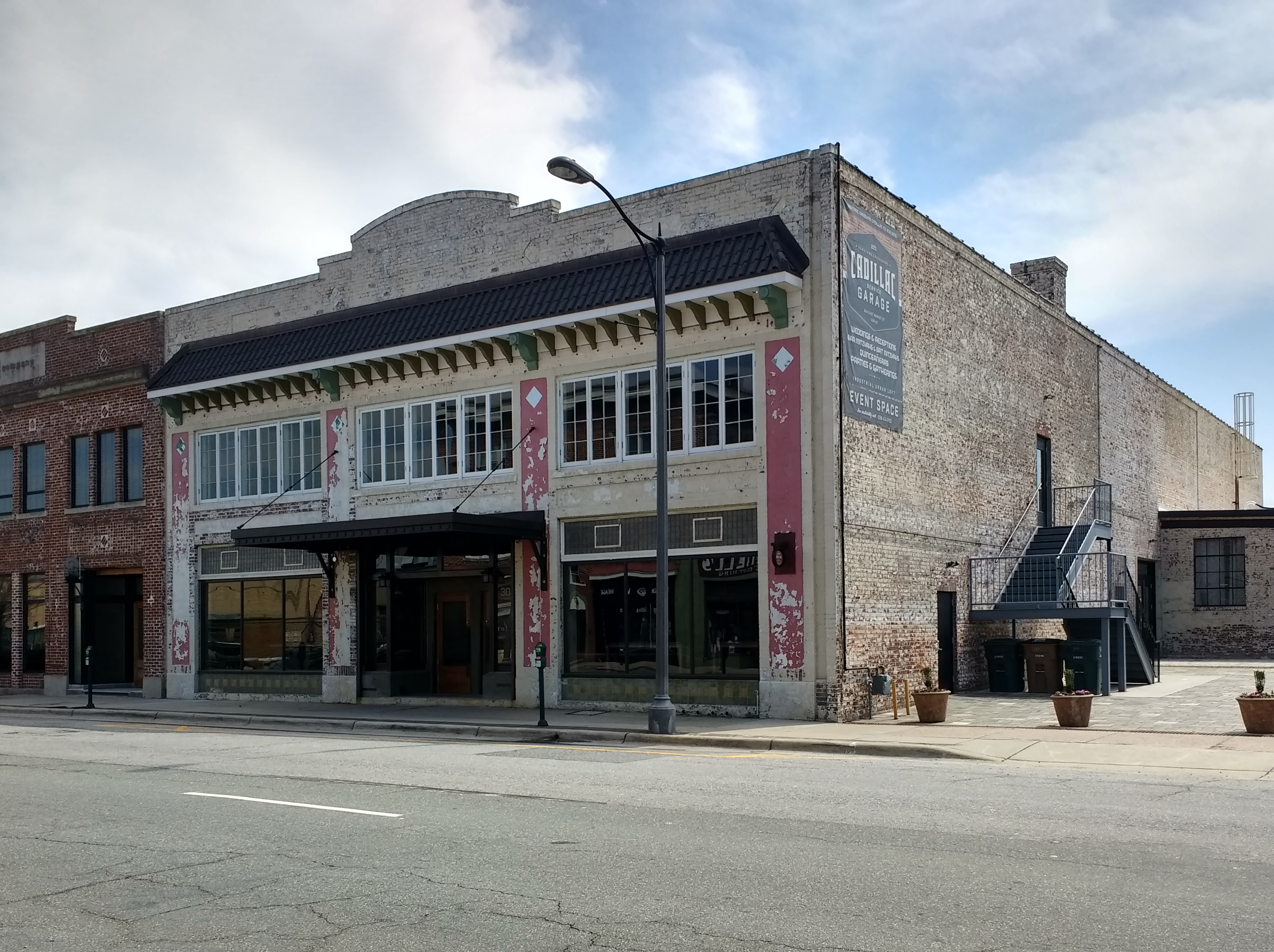

- Location within North Carolina Location within the United States
- Location: 304 E. Market St., Greensboro, North Carolina
- Coordinates: 36°4′19″N 79°47′12″W
- Area: less than one acre
- Built: 1922
- Architect: Simmonds, Harry J.
- Architectural style: Mission Revival
- NRHP reference No.: 14000520
- Added to NRHP: August 25, 2014

Carolina Cadillac Company Building, also known as Adamson Cadillac Co., Adamson-Cadillac-Olds. Co., and Black Cadillac-Olds., Inc., is a historic car dealership building located at Greensboro, Guilford County, North Carolina. It was built in 1922, and is a two-story, three-bay, rectangular brick commercial building with Mission Revival style embellishments. A one-story brick addition was added in 1940. The front facade features an original, decorative, metal awning over the entrance and a central shaped pediment topped with terra cotta coping.

It was listed on the National Register of Historic Places in 2014.
