= Former East White Oak School =

Historic school building in North Carolina, United States

- U.S. National Register of Historic Places
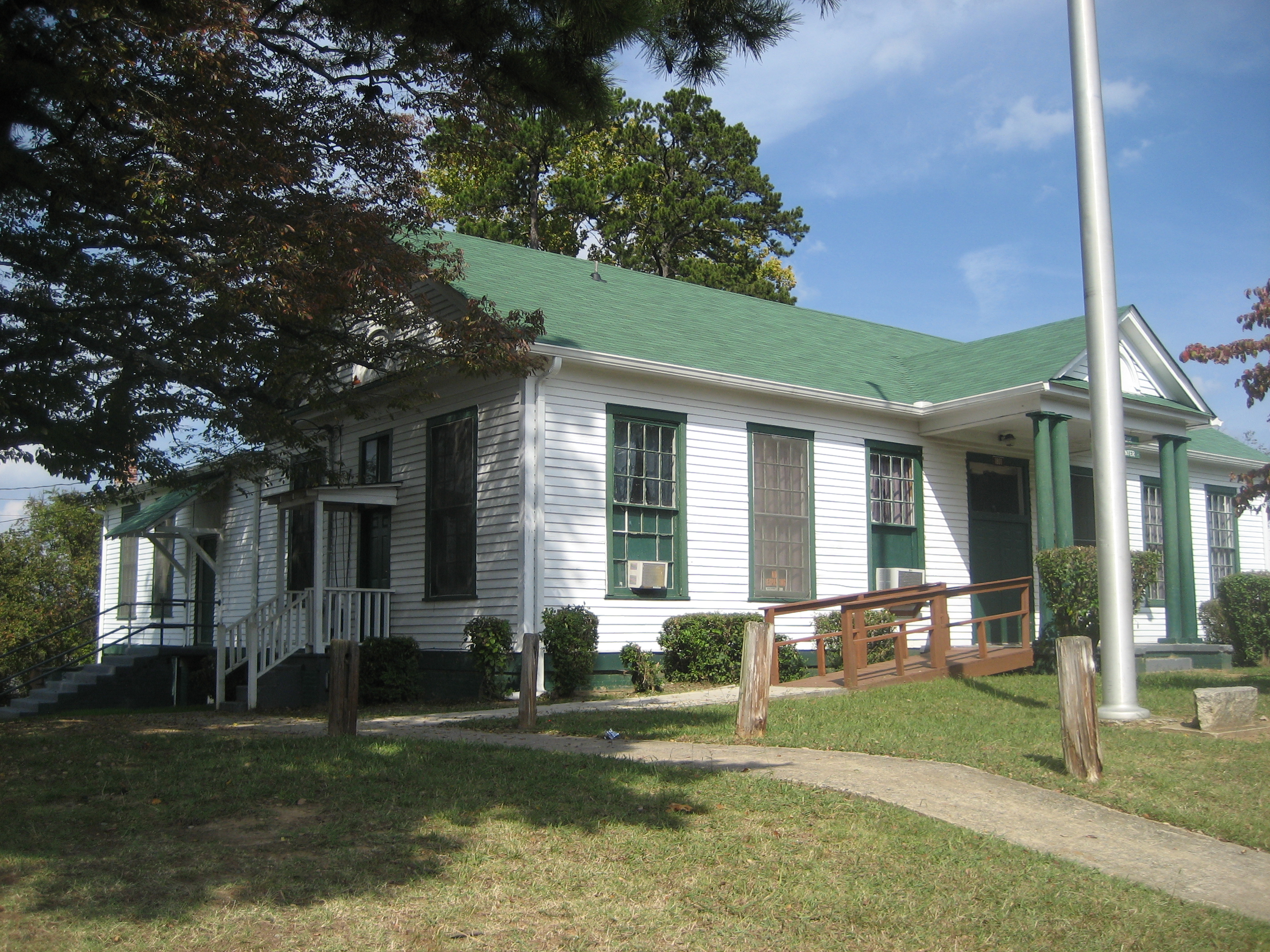
- Front and side, September 2012

- Location within North Carolina Location within the United States
- Location: 1801 Tenth St., Greensboro, North Carolina
- Coordinates: 36°6′4″N 79°45′37″W
- Area: 0.5 acres (0.20 ha)
- Built: 1916
- Architectural style: Colonial Revival
- MPS: Greensboro MPS
- NRHP reference No.: 92000360
- Added to NRHP: April 21, 1992

The former East White Oak School also known as East White Oak Community Center, is a historic school building for African-American students located at Greensboro, Guilford County, North Carolina. It was built in 1916, and is a one-story, seven-bay, Colonial Revival style frame building. It features a portico supported by four solid wood columns. One-story additions were built in the 1920s or 1930s to form a square-shaped building. The school closed in 1946, and subsequently housed a YMCA and community center.

It was listed on the National Register of Historic Places in 1992.
