= Holly Gate =

Historic house in North Carolina, United States

- U.S. National Register of Historic Places
- U.S. Historic district – Contributing property
- Location within North Carolina Location within the United States
- Location: NC 61, Whitsett, North Carolina
- Coordinates: 36°4′18″N 79°33′50″W
- Area: 4 acres (1.6 ha)
- Built: 1908-1910
- Architectural style: Colonial Revival, Queen Anne
- NRHP reference No.: 80002840
- Added to NRHP: September 22, 1980

Holly Gate, also known as J.H. Joyner House, is a historic home located at Whitsett, Guilford County, North Carolina. It was built in 1908–1910, and is a 2 1/2-story, transitional Queen Anne / Colonial Revival style frame dwelling. It has a tall hipped roof, three high chimneys, and a wraparound porch. It was built by James Henry Joyner, a professor at the Whitsett Institute.

It was listed on the National Register of Historic Places in 1980. It is located in the Whitsett Historic District.
