= Proximity Print Works =

Historic building complex in North Carolina, US

- U.S. National Register of Historic Places
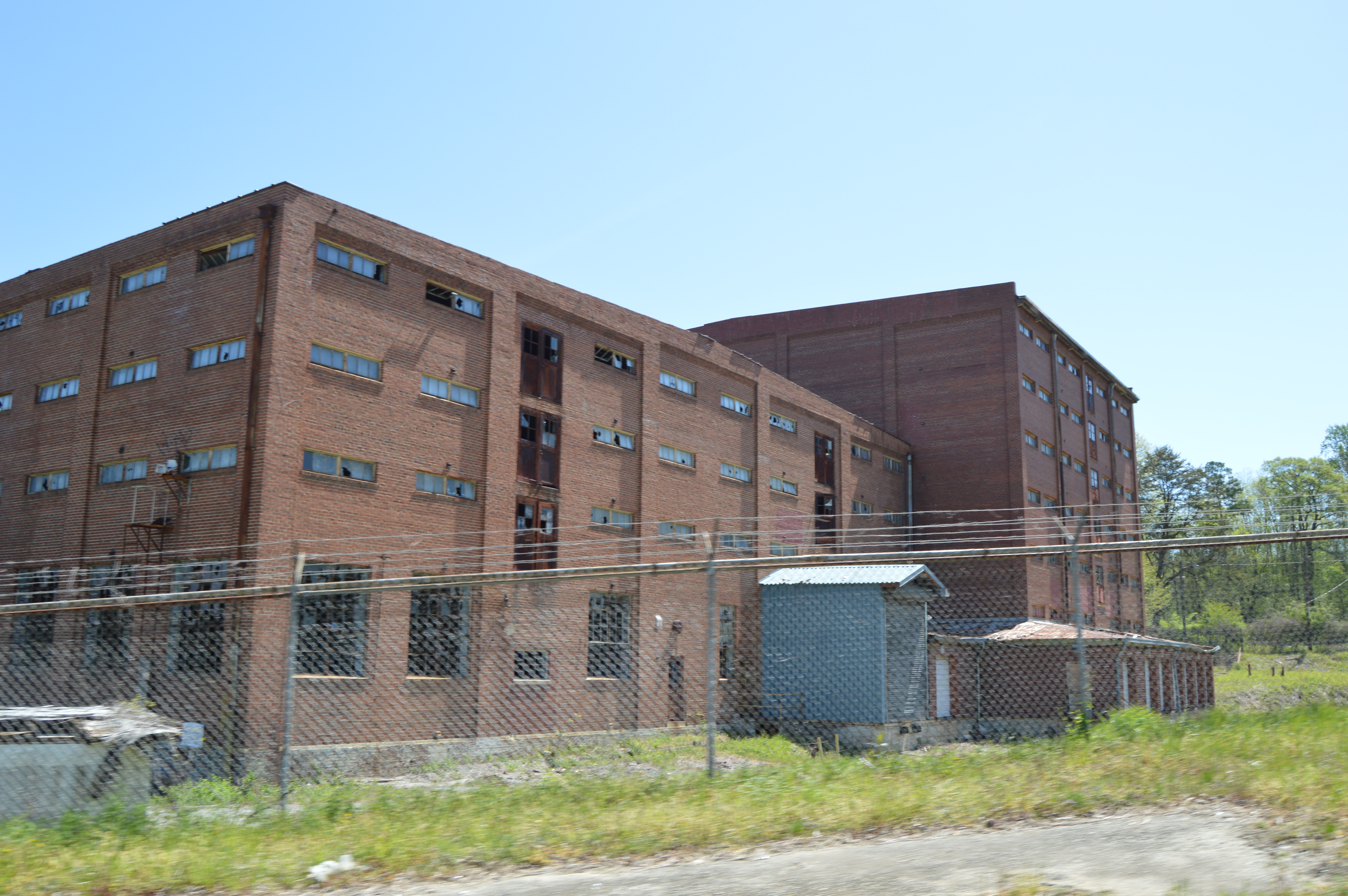
- Street view

- Location within North Carolina Location within the United States
- Location: 1700 Fairview St., Greensboro, North Carolina
- Coordinates: 36°06′04″N 79°46′20″W
- Area: 18.22 acres (7.37 ha)
- Built: 1913
- Architectural style: Art Deco
- NRHP reference No.: 14000986
- Added to NRHP: December 1, 2014

The Proximity Print Works, also known as Cone Finishing Plant, is a historic textile mill complex located at Greensboro, Guilford County, North Carolina. The complex includes nine contributing buildings, two contributing structures, and one contributing object. It is a large, brick, roughly rectangular collection of industrial buildings constructed in multiple stages beginning in 1913. It is notable as the first textile printery in the South. The mill remained in operation until 1977.

It was listed on the National Register of Historic Places in 2014.
