= Edward J. Forney House =

Historic house in North Carolina, United States

- U.S. National Register of Historic Places
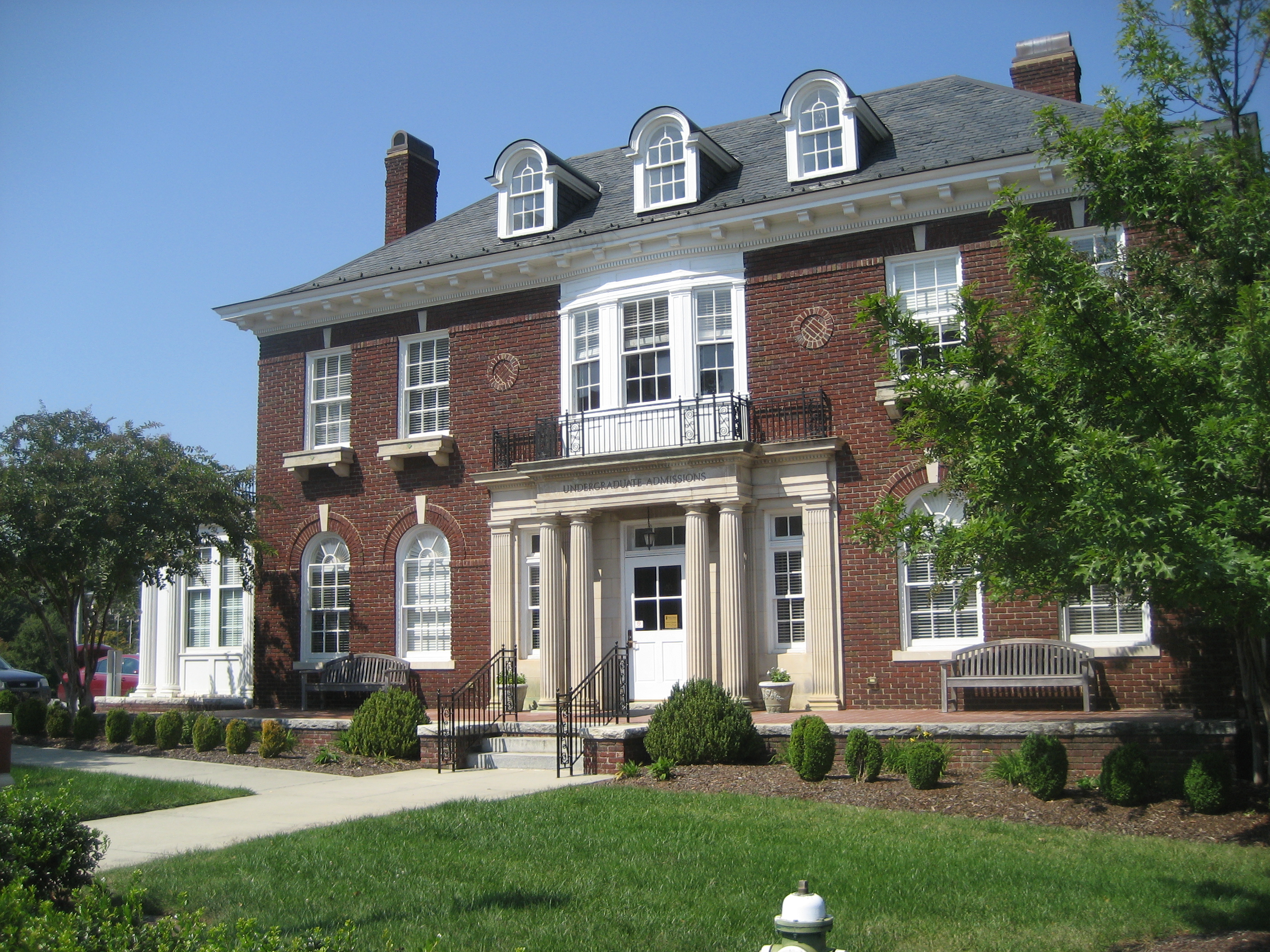
- The house in 2012

- Location within North Carolina Location within the United States
- Location: 1402 Spring Garden St., Greensboro, North Carolina
- Coordinates: 36°3′56″N 79°48′48″W
- Area: 0.7 acres (0.28 ha)
- Built: 1892
- Architectural style: Colonial Revival, Queen Anne
- MPS: Greensboro MPS
- NRHP reference No.: 92000359
- Added to NRHP: April 21, 1992

Edward J. Forney House is a historic home located at Greensboro, Guilford County, North Carolina. It was built about 1892, and was a 2 1/2-story, Queen Anne style frame dwelling. It featured a large polygonal tower. The house was updated in the early-20th century in the Colonial Revival style. It is located on the campus of the University of North Carolina at Greensboro.

It was listed on the National Register of Historic Places in 1992. The house was set for demolition in 1997 but was not torn down.
