= Former L. Richardson Memorial Hospital =

Historic building in North Carolina, US

Geography
- Location: Greensboro, North Carolina, United States

Organization
- Type: Hospital

History
- Former name: Americas Health Care of Greensboro Nursing Facility
- Opened: 1927
- Closed: 1966

Links
- Lists: Hospitals in North Carolina
- Former L. Richardson Memorial Hospital
- U.S. National Register of Historic Places
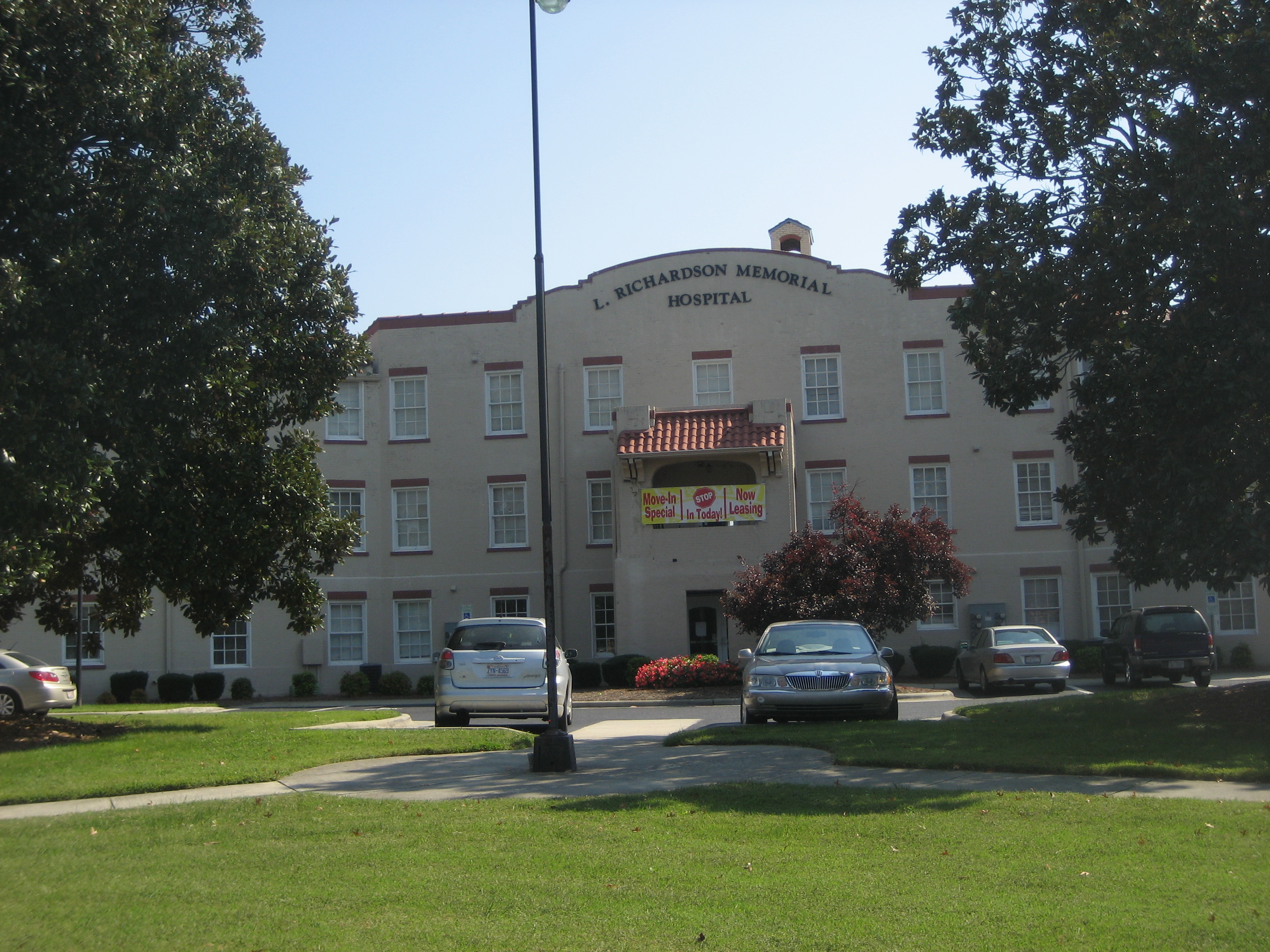
- Front of the hospital, September 2012

- Location within North Carolina Location within the United States
- Location: 603 S. Benbow Rd., Greensboro, North Carolina
- Coordinates: 36°4′4″N 79°46′14″W
- Area: 1.4 acres (0.57 ha)
- Built: 1927, 1930, 1945-1946
- Architect: J. Burton Wilder
- Architectural style: Mission/Spanish Revival
- MPS: Greensboro MPS
- NRHP reference No.: 92000180
- Added to NRHP: April 3, 1992

The former L. Richardson Memorial Hospital, also known as Americas Health Care of Greensboro Nursing Facility, is a historic hospital located at Greensboro, Guilford County, North Carolina.

The building was designed by Charles Hartmann, also known for the Jefferson Standard Building, Grimsley High School, Dudley High School and the Country Club Apartments. The original section was built in 1927, and is a three-story, seven-bay, Mission Revival-style stuccoed brick building with a two-bay-wide, three-story, brick wing constructed in 1930. A long two- and three-story addition was added in 1945–1946. It was Greensboro's first modern hospital for African-Americans.

The hospital moved to a new facility in 1966, and the old building sold for use as a nursing home. The hospital closed in 1990 and the 1966 building became a specialty hospital and then a long-term rehabilitation center.

The 1927 building was listed on the National Register of Historic Places in 1992. The nursing home, Elder Lodge of Greensboro, had many problems and closed in 1996. It was renovated at a cost of $3.5 million and dedicated in 2002 for apartments for senior citizens.
