= Lyndon Street Townhouses =

Historic houses in North Carolina, United States

- U.S. National Register of Historic Places
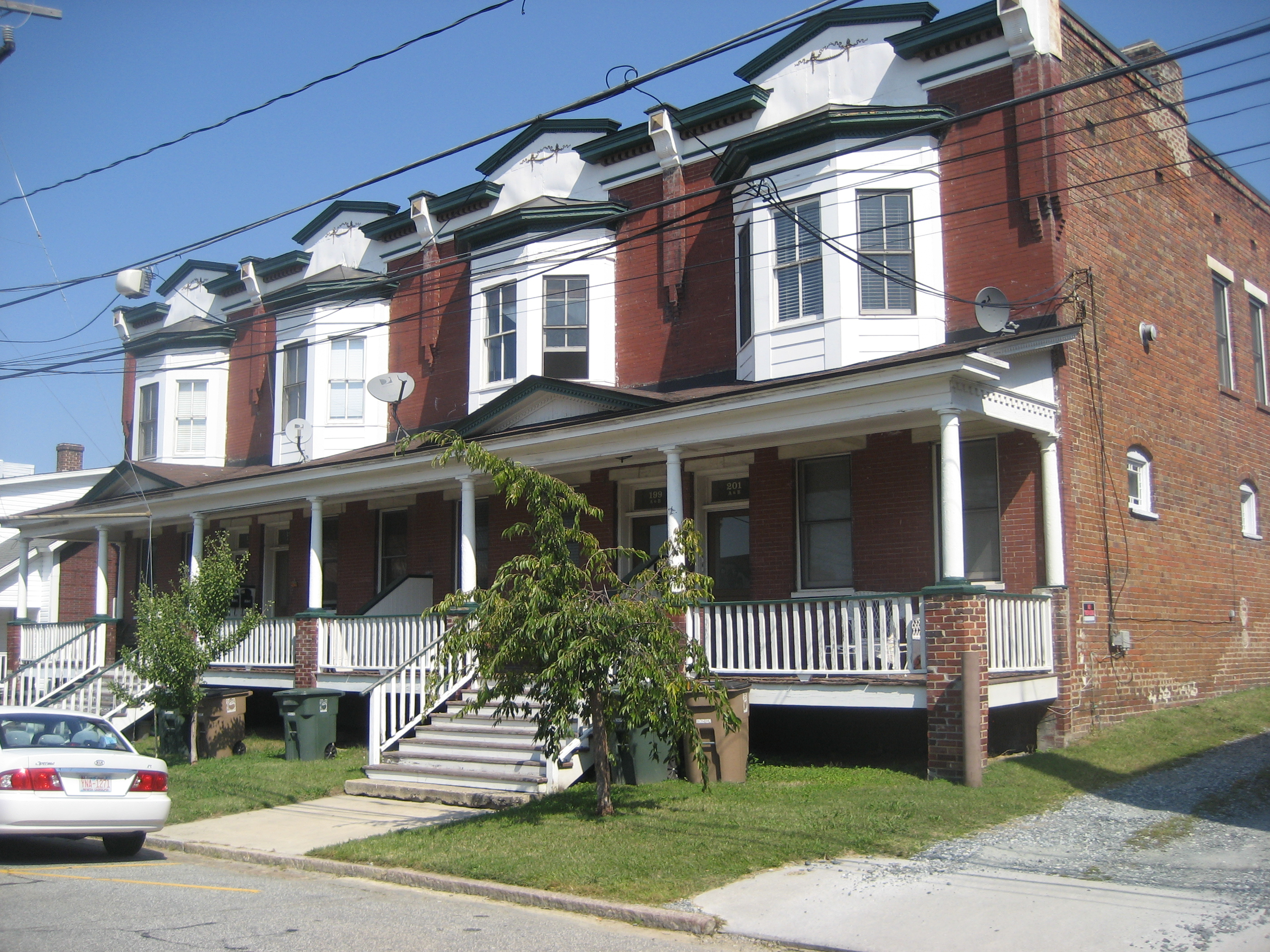
- Lyndon Street Townhouses, September 2012

- Location within North Carolina Location within the United States
- Location: 195-201 Lyndon St., Greensboro, North Carolina
- Coordinates: 36°4′16″N 79°47′7″W
- Area: 0.4 acres (0.16 ha)
- Built: c. 1905
- Architectural style: Colonial Revival, Queen Anne
- MPS: Greensboro MPS
- NRHP reference No.: 92000178
- Added to NRHP: April 3, 1992

Lyndon Street Townhouses are four historic rowhouses located at Greensboro, Guilford County, North Carolina, US. They were built in about 1905, and are two-story, three-bay, brick structures with Colonial Revival- and Queen Anne-style design elements. Each house has a polygonal bay window at the second story. The houses are united by a porch spanning their full width, supported by seven Doric order columns raised on tall brick piers.

The row was listed on the National Register of Historic Places in 1992.
