= Low House (Whitsett, North Carolina) =

Historic house in North Carolina, United States

- U.S. National Register of Historic Places
- Location within North Carolina Location within the United States
- Location: South of Gibsonville, near Whitsett, North Carolina
- Coordinates: 36°2′59″N 79°34′13″W
- Area: less than one acre
- Architectural style: Federal
- NRHP reference No.: 78001957
- Added to NRHP: March 8, 1978

Low House is a historic home located near Whitsett, Guilford County, North Carolina. It dates to the 1820s, and is a two-story, five bay Federal-style brick dwelling. It has a gable roof, stone foundation, and one-story rear wing. The house was renovated in 1968–1969.

It was listed on the National Register of Historic Places in 1978.
