= Foust–Carpenter and Dean Dick Farms =

Historic farm in North Carolina, United States

- U.S. National Register of Historic Places
- U.S. Historic district
- Location within North Carolina Location within the United States
- Location: East and west sides of Mt. Hope Church Rd. and north and south sides of Carpenter House Rd., near Whitsett, North Carolina
- Coordinates: 36°1′26″N 79°37′53″W
- Area: 325.2 acres (131.6 ha)
- Built: 1898
- Architectural style: 2 story frame I house
- NRHP reference No.: 09000504
- Added to NRHP: July 1, 2009

Foust–Carpenter and Dean Dick Farms are two historic farms and national historic district located near Whitsett, Guilford County, North Carolina. The district encompasses 27 contributing buildings and 1 contributing site and includes houses and agricultural outbuildings dating from the late-19th to mid-20th century. They include the John C. and Barbara Foust House (c. 1898), Tenant House / John B. and Lucille Carpenter House, two barns, corn crib, packhouse, tobacco barn (c. 1920s, 1947), Tenant House (c. 1875), Carpenter Lake House (1940s), and Milking Barn.

It was listed on the National Register of Historic Places in 2009.
