= Daniel P. Foust House =

Historic house in North Carolina, United States

- U.S. National Register of Historic Places
- Location within North Carolina Location within the United States
- Location: 439 Brightwood Church Rd., near Whitsett, North Carolina
- Coordinates: 36°4′40″N 79°34′48″W
- Area: 21.4 acres (8.7 ha)
- Built: c. 1856, c. 1867-1881
- Architectural style: Greek Revival, Italianate
- NRHP reference No.: 04001522
- Added to NRHP: January 20, 2005

Daniel P. Foust House is a historic home located near Whitsett, Guilford County, North Carolina. It consists of a two-story, three-bay Greek Revival style block built about 1856, with a two-story, triple-gable, frame Italianate style main block built between 1867 and 1881. It features an elaborately decorated two-tiered front porch. Also on the property is a contributing granary (c. 1860) and cold frame (c. 1880).

It was listed on the National Register of Historic Places in 2005.
