= Former Pomona High School =

Historic school building in North Carolina, United States

- Pomona High School, Former
- U.S. National Register of Historic Places
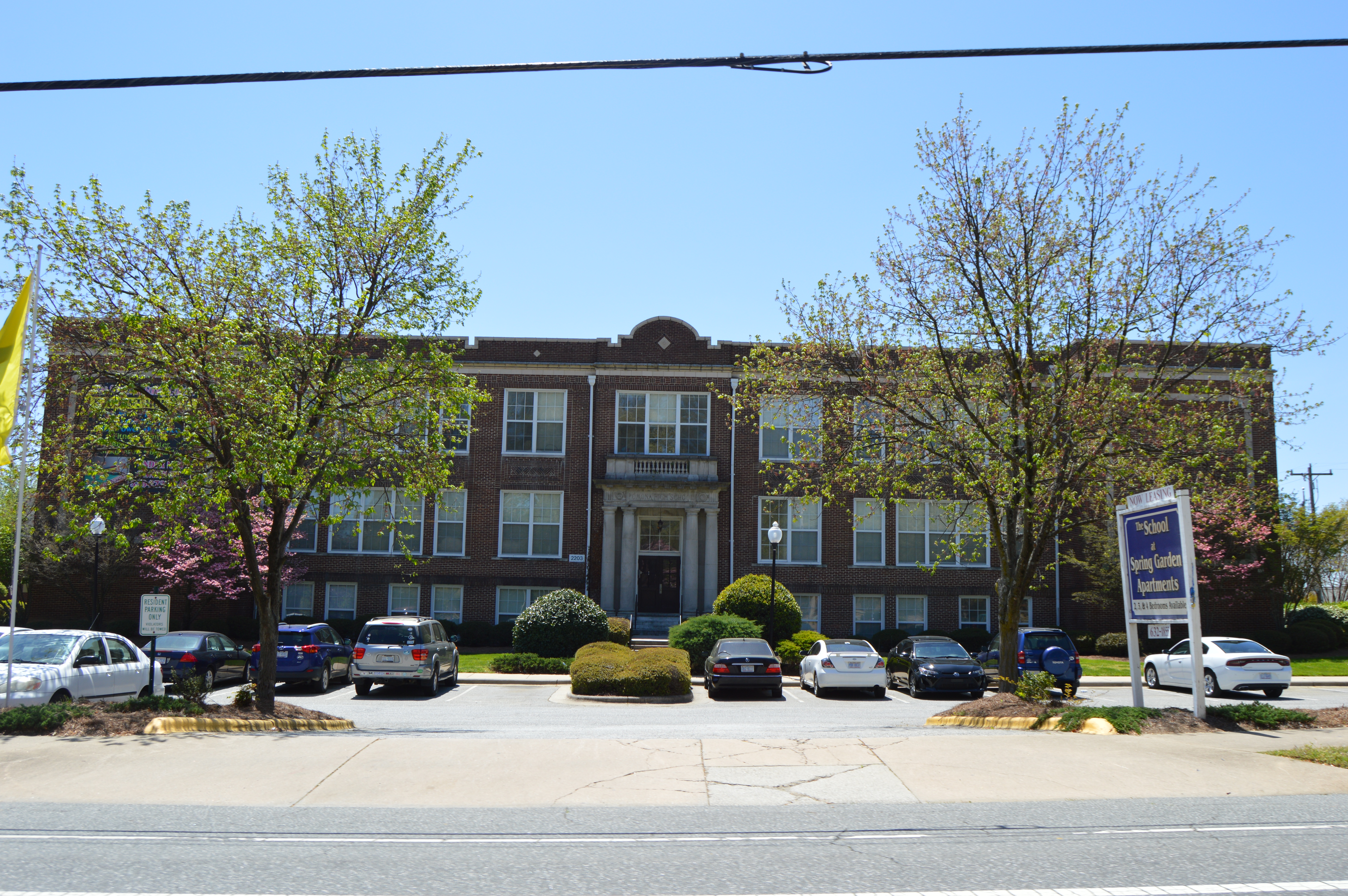
- Front of the school

- Location within North Carolina Location within the United States
- Location: 2201 Spring Garden St., Greensboro, North Carolina
- Coordinates: 36°3′47″N 79°49′48″W
- Area: 2.5 acres (1.0 ha)
- Built: c. 1920, 1940, 1951
- Architectural style: Classical Revival
- MPS: Greensboro MPS
- NRHP reference No.: 92001888
- Added to NRHP: February 24, 1995

Pomona High School, Former, also known as Lindley Junior High School, is a historic school building located at Greensboro, Guilford County, North Carolina. The original section was built about 1920, and is a two-story, nine-bay, U-shaped, Classical Revival style building. Two projecting wings were added in 1940, and in 1951, the space was filled between the wings. It is faced with dark bricks accented with limestone, concrete, and terra cotta ornament. The building features a one-story limestone entrance portico supported by four Doric order columns. The school closed in 1979. It has been converted to apartments.

It was listed on the National Register of Historic Places in 1992.
