= Kellenberger Estate =

Historic district in North Carolina, United States

- U.S. National Register of Historic Places
- U.S. Historic district
- Location within North Carolina Location within the United States
- Location: 1415 Kellenberger Rd., Greensboro, North Carolina
- Coordinates: 36°03′06.4″N 79°40′14.5″W
- Area: 32.6 acres (13.2 ha)
- Built: 1921
- Architectural style: Colonial Revival, Bungalow/craftsman
- NRHP reference No.: 94000218
- Added to NRHP: March 17, 1994

Kellenberger Estate, also known as Miramichi, is a historic estate and national historic district located in Greensboro, Guilford County, North Carolina. The district encompasses five contributing buildings, two contributing sites, and six contributing structures built between about 1921 and 1944. The landscape, designed and planted 1921–1944, includes the contributing Stone grottos (c. 1925), Curvilinear Pool (c. 1925), Open Picnic Area (c. 1925), Lake (c. 1915), Dam (c. 1915), Covered Picnic Area (late 1920s), Boathouse (c. 1930), and Swimming Pool (c. 1930). The Kellenberger House is a Colonial Revival style dwelling built in stages between about 1921 and 1944. At its core is a mid-19th century V-notched log house. Associated with the house are the contributing Log Outbuilding (c. 1925), Bungalow style Tenant House (c. 1930), and Chicken House (c. 1925).

It was listed on the National Register of Historic Places in 1994.
