= Michael Sherwood House =

Historic house in North Carolina, United States

- U.S. National Register of Historic Places
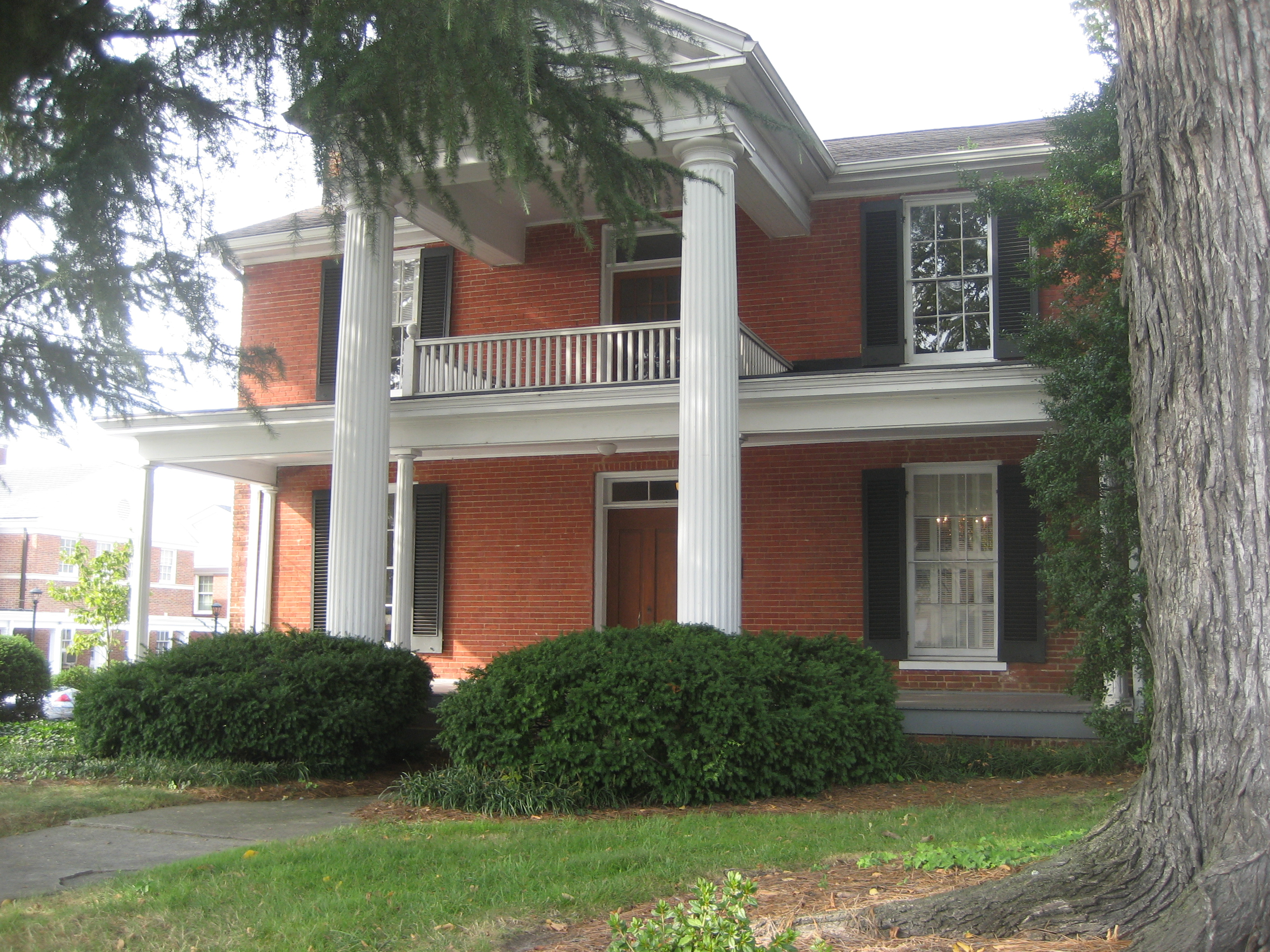
- Michael Sherwood House, September 2012

- Location within North Carolina Location within the United States
- Location: 426 W. Friendly Ave., Greensboro, North Carolina
- Coordinates: 36°4′26″N 79°47′43″W
- Area: less than one acre
- Built: 1849-1851
- Architectural style: Greek Revival
- NRHP reference No.: 78001958
- Added to NRHP: January 31, 1978

Michael Sherwood House is a historic home located at Greensboro, Guilford County, North Carolina. It was built between 1849 and 1851, and is a two-story, three bay by two bay, Greek Revival style brick dwelling with an original, one-story rear brick wing. Later additions include a second story to the rear wing, a curious stair tower and several rooms, and a full-height front portico with Roman Doric order columns.

It was listed on the National Register of Historic Places in 1978.
