= South Greensboro Historic District =

Historic district in North Carolina, United States

- U.S. National Register of Historic Places
- U.S. Historic district
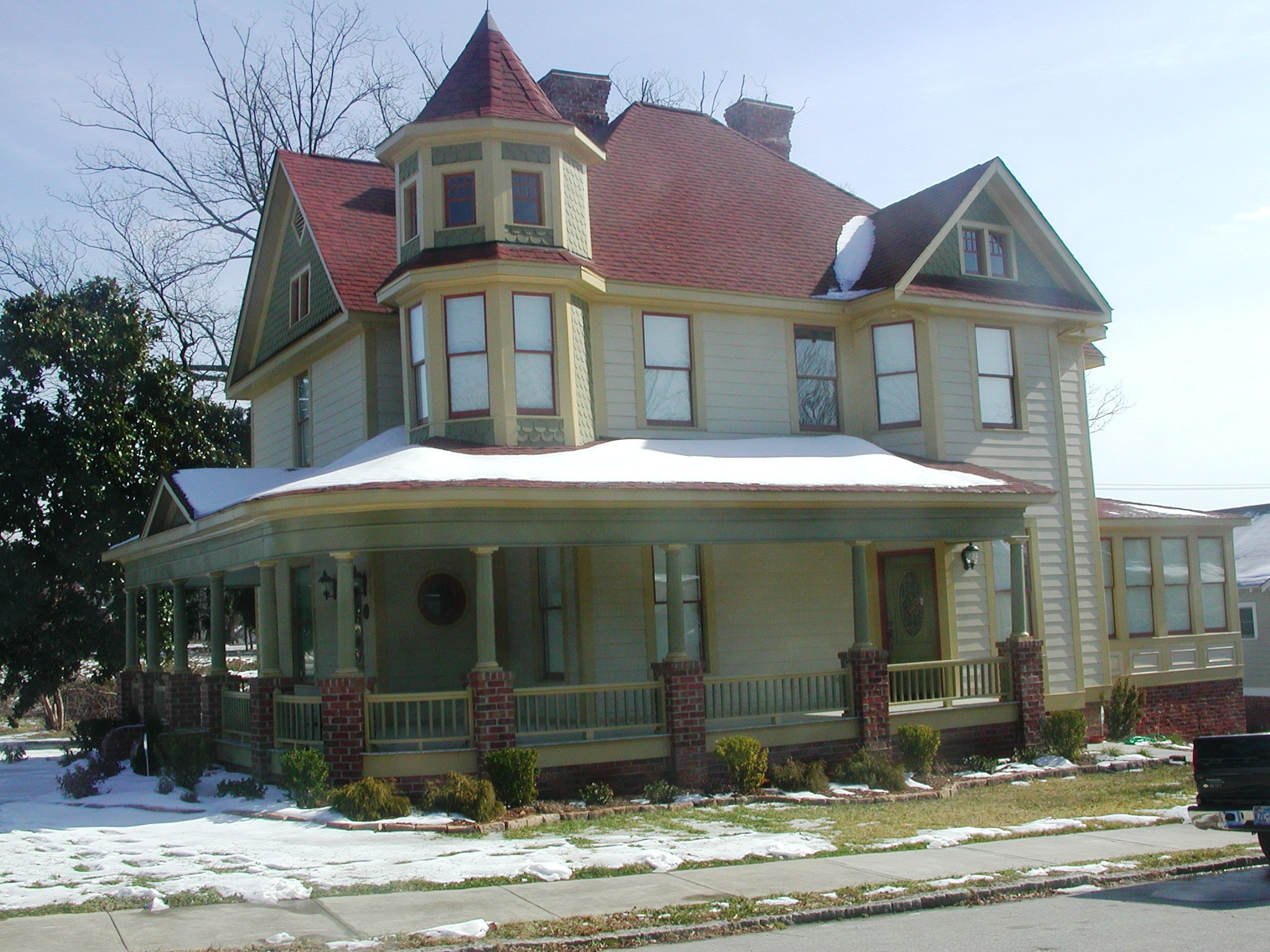
- Atkinson House, June 2007

- Location within North Carolina Location within the United States
- Location: Roughly bounded by Gorrell, Martin, E. Bragg, Sevier, Omaha, Broad, Caldwell, Andrew, Vance, McCulloch, and King Dr., Greensboro, North Carolina
- Coordinates: 36°03′40″N 79°47′06″W
- Area: 116 acres (47 ha)
- Built: 1891
- Architectural style: Bungalow/craftsman, Italianate, Queen Anne
- MPS: Greensboro MPS
- NRHP reference No.: 91001812
- Added to NRHP: December 20, 1991

The South Greensboro National Register Historic District, consists of three historic neighborhoods, Ole Asheboro, Arlington Park and Southside, and is located in Greensboro, Guilford County, North Carolina. The district encompasses 327 contributing buildings, 1 contributing site, 10 contributing structures, and 1 contributing object in a predominantly residential section of Greensboro. The houses were largely built between the 1870s and the 1930s and include notable examples of Queen Anne, Italianate, American Foursquare, and Bungalow / American Craftsman-style architecture. Notable buildings include the Atkinson House, Hanner House, B.E. Jones House, T. Bernard House, C.O. Younts House, W.S. Witherspoon House, and R. N. Watson House, former Asheboro Street Church (now Skeenes Chapel, 1910-1913), former Southside Hose Company (c. 1905-1910) and the former David Cadlwell School, now Nettie Mae Coad Apartments (c. 1922).

It was listed on the National Register of Historic Places in 1991.
