= List of people from Greensboro, North Carolina =

This is a list of notable people who were either born in, lived in or are closely associated with Greensboro, North Carolina and have an article on Wikipedia.

== A–E ==
- Ethan Albright, NFL Pro Bowl long snapper, played for University of North Carolina and NFL's Miami Dolphins, Buffalo Bills, and Washington Redskins
- Elreta Alexander-Ralston, judge and attorney
- Keenan Allen, NFL Pro Bowl wide receiver for the Los Angeles Chargers
- Robert Sylvester Alston, serial killer who raped and murdered at least 4 women from 1991 to 1993
- Tom Alston, former Major League Baseball first baseman and first African-American to play for the St. Louis Cardinals
- Samuel E. Anderson, United States Air Force four-star general; commanded Fifth Air Force during the Korean War
- Clarence Avant, entertainment industry executive
- Patrick Bailey, catcher for the San Francisco Giants
- Fantasia Barrino, winner of American Idol season three and Grammy Award-winning R&B singer, briefly lived in Greensboro and is from nearby High Point
- Thomas Berry, ecology spokesman
- Rex M. Best, Emmy Award-winning writer for the CBS daytime dramas The Young and the Restless and The Bold and the Beautiful
- Jake Bloss, Major League Baseball pitcher
- Jeff Bostic, NFL offensive lineman for the Washington Redskins
- Joe Bostic, NFL offensive lineman for the St. Louis (later Arizona) Cardinals
- Alan Branson, politician
- Michael Brooks, NFL defensive back
- Hal "Skinny" Brown, MLB pitcher, member of Baltimore Orioles Hall of Fame
- Tony Brown, record producer
- Joseph M. Bryan, businessman and philanthropist, lived in Greensboro until his death in 1995
- Kathleen Price Bryan, philanthropist, was born and lived in Greensboro
- Frances Webb Bumpass, newspaper publisher
- Lamont Burns, NFL offensive lineman
- Sharon Raiford Bush, American television's first African-American female weather anchor of primetime news, in 1975 at WGPR-TV, the US's first black-owned-and-operated television station
- Gianluca Busio, soccer player
- Andy Cabic, of indie folk band Vetiver; lived in Greensboro while a member of indie-rock band The Raymond Brake
- Jonathan Campbell, soccer player
- Orson Scott Card, author, journalist and professor; several of his books, including Ender's Game and Shadow Puppets, feature settings in and around Greensboro
- Jimmy Carpenter, electric blues saxophonist, singer, songwriter, arranger and record producer
- Eugene Chadbourne, composer and musician
- Spencer Chamberlain, lead vocalist of the band Underoath, was raised in Greensboro
- Joey Cheek, Olympic gold medal speed skater
- Howard Coble, former member of U.S. House of Representatives (6th District, N.C.)
- Levi Coffin, Quaker educator and abolitionist
- Tarik Cohen, NFL player, attended North Carolina A&T State University
- Billy "Crash" Craddock, country music singer, born and lives near Greensboro
- Chris Daughtry, American Idol contestant
- Jeff Davis, NFL player for Tampa Bay Buccaneers and member of Clemson's 1981 national championship team; attended Dudley High School
- Rick Dees, radio personality; graduated from Grimsley High School
- Louis DeJoy, US postmaster and major Republican Party benefactor
- Marques Douglas, NFL player
- James Lamont DuBose, executive television and film producer, BET
- Eric Ebron, NFL tight end; attended Ben L. Smith High School
- Donna Edmondson, 1987 Playboy Playmate of the year
- Je'von Evans, WWE Superstar
- Vince Evans, NFL quarterback and 1977 Rose Bowl most valuable player

== F–J ==
- Barry Farber, radio talk show host, author and language-learning enthusiast; born in Greensboro, and graduated from Greensboro Senior High School (see Grimsley High School)
- Tal Farlow, pioneering jazz guitarist
- Rick Ferrell, MLB catcher 1929–47, eight-time All-Star, member of the National Baseball Hall of Fame
- Wes Ferrell, MLB pitcher 1927–41, two-time All-Star
- Henry Flynt (b. 1940), philosopher, avant-garde musician, anti-art activist and exhibited artist often associated with Conceptual Art, Fluxus and Nihilism
- Charles Foster, Olympic track hurdler
- Inez and Charlie Foxx, rhythm-and-blues and soul duo known for the 1963 hit "Mockingbird"
- Golda Fried, novelist and poet
- Elissa Minet Fuchs, ballerina and ballet mistress
- Peter Paul Fuchs, composer and conductor
- Michimasa Fujino, president and CEO of Honda Aircraft Company
- Rhiannon Giddens, singer-songwriter and multi-instrumentalist, co-founder of the Carolina Chocolate Drops
- Edwin Forbes Glenn, United States Army officer
- Eugene Godsoe, American former competition swimmer, who specialized in backstroke and butterfly events
- Adam Green, cognitive neuroscientist
- Leah Naomi Green, poet and essayist
- Dino Hackett, NFL linebacker; jersey number retired by Appalachian State
- Joey Hackett, NFL tight end
- Kay Hagan, former U.S. senator
- PJ Hairston, played college basketball for North Carolina Tar Heels, 26th pick in the 2014 NBA draft by Charlotte Hornets, now plays for Rio Grande Valley Vipers of the NBA Development League
- Karly Hartzman, singer-songwriter and musician with Wednesday
- Brendan Haywood, NBA player for Dallas Mavericks, attended Dudley High School
- O. Henry, short story writer
- John Henson, NBA player for the Cleveland Cavaliers
- David Hickman, last American soldier killed in the Iraq War
- Matt Hill, electric blues guitarist, singer and songwriter
- Terrence Holt, NFL safety, played for NC State and Detroit Lions; born in nearby Gibsonville along with his brother Torry Holt
- Lauren Holt, former Saturday Night Live cast member
- Torry Holt, wide receiver for NC State and All-Pro for the St. Louis Rams; born in nearby Gibsonville and attended Eastern Guilford High School
- Lindsey Hopkins Jr., businessman, banker, investor, and sportsman
- Lou Hudson, NBA All-Star
- Chanita Hughes-Halbert, psychologist and medical researcher
- Jim Hunt, former 69th and 71st governor of North Carolina
- John Inman, professional golfer who played on the PGA Tour
- John Isner, professional tennis player
- Jesse Jackson, civil rights activist, minister, politician, attended and graduated from North Carolina A&T University
- Randall Jarrell, nationally acclaimed poet, professor at University of North Carolina at Greensboro until his death in 1965; buried near Guilford College campus
- Haywood Jeffires, NFL Pro Bowl wide receiver for Houston Oilers and New Orleans Saints, coach of a Texas semi-pro team
- Ken Jeong, actor, grew up in Greensboro, North Carolina and graduated from Page High School; starred in NBC sitcom Community
- Dr. Frank Jobe, orthopedic surgeon, invented UCL reconstruction known as Tommy John surgery
- Robert Elijah Jones, early African American bishop in the Methodist Church

== K–O ==
- Paris Kea, All-American basketball player at the University of North Carolina Chapel Hill, WNBA player
- Richard M. Kenan, member of the South Carolina House of Representatives
- J. William Kime, commandant of the U.S. Coast Guard
- Debra Lee, chief executive officer of BET
- John Anthony Lennon (b. 1950), composer
- Janet Lilly, dancer, choreographer and professor at the University of North Carolina at Greensboro
- Caroline Lind, Olympic rower and two-time gold medalist in the women's eight event
- Ann Livermore, former executive vice president at Hewlett-Packard
- Frank Lucas, infamous heroin dealer, subject of American Gangster film starring Denzel Washington
- Loretta Lynch, attorney general of the United States
- Dolley Madison, First Lady and wife of President James Madison
- Carolyn Maloney (née Carolyn Jane Bosher, born 1946), politician serving as U.S. representative
- Danny Manning, All-America basketball player for the University of Kansas and NBA star, attended Page High School in Greensboro
- Kathy Manning, U.S. representative
- Doug Marlette, Pulitzer Prize-winning cartoonist
- Margaret Maron, author of award-winning mystery novels
- Joyce Martin Dixon, businesswoman and philanthropist
- Jack F. Matlock, Jr., U.S. ambassador to U.S.S.R., 1987–1991
- Maryhelen Mayfield, ballet dancer and former artistic and executive director of Greensboro Ballet, lived in Greensboro
- Bob McAdoo, NBA All-Star, college basketball All-American, and member of the Basketball Hall of Fame
- Franklin McCain, one of The Greensboro Four, African-American student from North Carolina A&T State University who in 1960 started the first civil rights sit-in; action eventually led to lunch counters and restaurants being desegregated throughout the Southern United States; attended Dudley
- Courtney McClellan, interdisciplinary artist
- Adrian McDonnell, conductor living in France
- Mark McGuinn, country music artist
- Joseph McNeil, one of the Greensboro Four, male African-American student from North Carolina A&T State University who in 1960 started the first civil rights sit-in; action eventually led to lunch counters and restaurants being desegregated throughout the Southern US
- Beth Mitchell, competitive shag dancer
- Jason Miyares, 48th attorney general of Virginia
- John Motley Morehead, 29th governor of North Carolina
- Emmanuel Moseley, NFL cornerback
- Cedric Mullins, MLB player for the Tampa Bay Rays
- Edward R. Murrow, World War II CBS radio broadcaster and award-winning television journalist; born outside Greensboro
- Fred "Curly" Neal, basketball player, Harlem Globetrotters
- Ed Nelson, actor who played Dr. Michael Rossi on Peyton Place, spent last years in Greensboro and died there in 2014

== P–T ==
- Michael Parker, novelist
- Clara J. Peck, public health nurse and hospital matron
- Ronald Perelman, billionaire investor
- Garry Peterson, longtime drummer for the Guess Who
- Carl Pettersson, Swedish PGA Tour player, graduated from Grimsley High School
- Theo Pinson, NBA player for the Brooklyn Nets
- Eddie Pope, soccer player for Real Salt Lake and the US National Soccer Team
- Millard Powers, musician, songwriter, record producer, and Grammy-nominated recording engineer; member of Counting Crows
- George Preddy, World War II fighter ace
- Ethel Clay Price, nurse and socialite
- Julian Price, insurance executive
- Ricky Proehl, NFL player
- Morgan Radford, journalist and reporter for NBC News and MSNBC
- D.J. Reader, NFL defensive tackle
- Eddie Robinson, Major League Soccer (MLS) player
- Mark Robinson, 35th lieutenant governor of North Carolina
- Lee Rouson, NFL running back, attended Page High School
- Ryan Wesley Routh, suspected attempted assassin of Donald Trump
- Virginia Ragsdale, mathematician and creator of the Ragsdale conjecture
- Ski Beatz, music producer
- Charlie Sanders, member of Pro Football Hall of Fame and North Carolina Sports Hall of Fame, NFL tight end for Detroit Lions, attended Dudley High School
- H.T. Kirby-Smith, author and poet
- Graham Sharp, musician
- Nicholas Sparks, author
- Josephine Sprott (1867–1952), President, Woman's Christian Temperance Union of South Carolina
- Wilbur Daniel Steele, author, playwright, Provincetown Players
- Stanley Tanger, founder of Tanger Factory Outlet Centers
- Edwin Teague, Olympic sports shooter
- Sonny Terry, blues musician (1911–1986)
- Whitney Way Thore, star of TLC's My Big Fat Fabulous Life
- Bill Tudor, founder of Tudor's Biscuit World

== U–Z ==
- Jan Van Dyke, dancer and choreographer, resided in Greensboro, taught at the University of North Carolina at Greensboro; pioneer for modern dance in Greensboro
- Jeff Varner, Survivor contestant (Season 2)
- Nancy Vaughan, 48th mayor of Greensboro
- Robert Walden, pioneer NASCAR driver, lives near Greensboro
- Cody Ware, NASCAR driver
- Allen Webster, MLB pitcher
- Gene White, NFL defensive back
- Kelly Wiglesworth, Survivor contestant (Season 1)
- Aldona Wos, physician and politician who has served in various positions at several U.S. government agencies and nonprofit organizations
- Jerome Young, professional wrestler; born, lived, and died in Greensboro
