= Fisher Park, Greensboro, North Carolina =

Neighborhood in Greensboro, North Carolina

Fisher Park
- Greensboro neighborhood
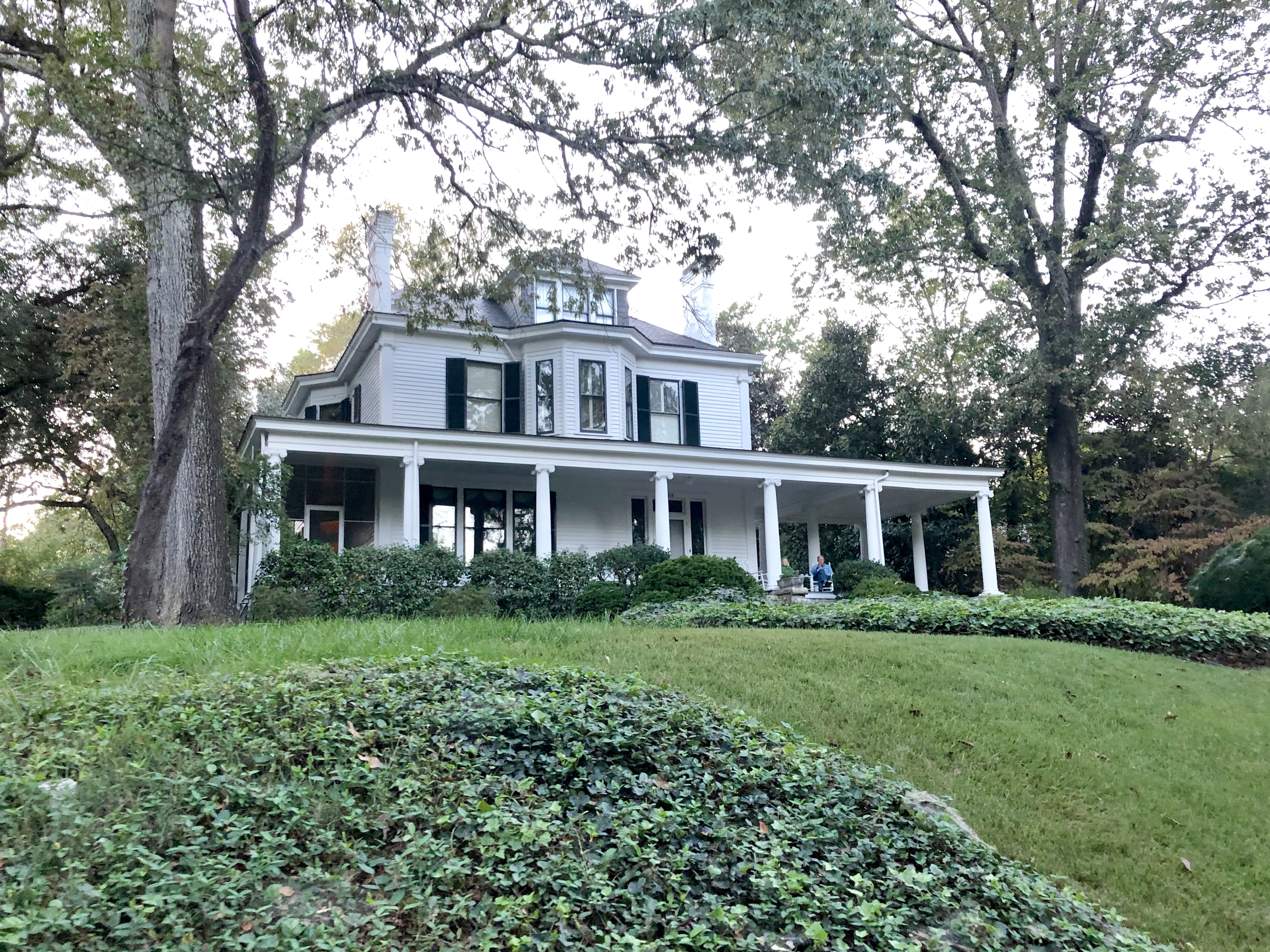
- Country: United States
- State: North Carolina
- City: Greensboro
- Named for: Captain Basil J. Fisher
- Time zone: EST

Fisher Park is a neighborhood in the north central section of the United States city of Greensboro, North Carolina.Captain Basil J. Fisher turned a swamp into Greensboro's most fashionable Gilded Era address in 1901 when he donated the lowlands for a city park that bears his name. Residents took full advantage of ample lots overlooking the park by commissioning the city's best architects to design sometimes palatial homes. The neighborhood is recognized as Greensboro's first suburb, and is the city's most popular historic district. Furthermore, Fisher Park marks the geographical center of Guilford County, North Carolina.

== Geography ==
=== Boundaries ===
Fisher Park is bounded as follows:

- on the north by Wendover Avenue;
- on the west by the Green Hill Cemetery;
- on the east by the Southern Railway tracks; and
- on the south by the central business district and Smith Street.

=== ZIP code ===
The 27401 ZIP code corresponds entirely or almost entirely with Fisher Park.

== History ==
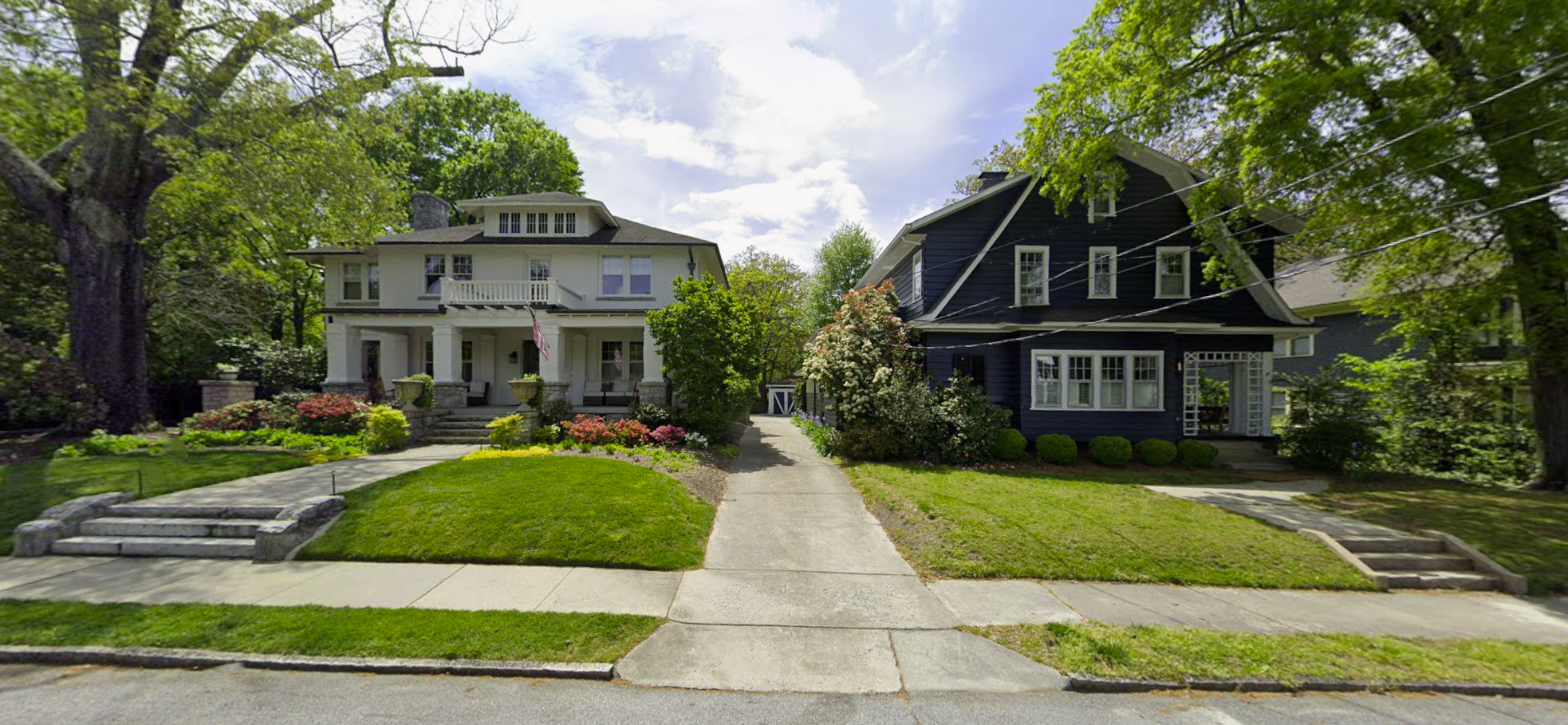
Fisher Park Historic District

With the establishment of the trolley line through the heart of the neighborhood in 1902, industrialists, bankers, and professionals erected homes based on popular national styles such as Frank Lloyd Wright-influenced Prairie School style, California-based American Craftsman style, and New England-inspired Colonial Revival styles. The district remained the epicenter of Greensboro's cultural elite until it was overshadowed by Irving Park, just a mile to the north. The Fisher Park Historic District was listed on the National Register of Historic Places in 1992, with a boundary increase in 1996.

The 1950s and 60s brought challenges to the neighborhood bordering Greensboro's center city as office development threatened to replace historic homes. Efforts to regulate development and change advanced in 1982 when the neighborhood was designated as Greensboro's second historic district. Since then, the rate of destruction of historic homes has slowed (but not halted), the park has received a much needed make-over, and land values have spiraled upwards.

== Culture ==
Famous for the "Hillside" or Julian Price House, a large historic mansion, this house has been featured on the show, Hoarders (Season 9 Episode 5). Fisher Park remains a popular destination for city residents who walk the tree-lined streets and lush park during lunchtime, attend occasional house tours, and enjoy a shaded diversion during summer heat. The district enjoys a wide diversity of private historic homes, some dating back to the nineteenth century, such as The Elms at 220 Fisher Avenue, the Dixon-Leftwich-Murphy House at 507 Church Street. Other houses represent a broader spectrum of twentieth century styles, including the Tudor-style John Marion Galloway House at 1007 North Elm Street, the prairie-styled Latham-Baker House at 412 Fisher Park Circle, the Classical Revival-style Henry C. Simpson House at 117 East Hendrix Street (circa 1906) and the charming Spanish-style Casa Sevilla Apartments on Bessemer Court (all private).

== Parks and public spaces ==
- Fisher Park
- Green Hill cemetery

== Notable architects and builders ==
- Hobart Upjohn
- Charles C. Hartmann
- Harry Barton

== Other notable civic institutions ==
- First Presbyterian Church of Greensboro
- Holy Trinity Episcopal Church
- Temple Emanuel

== On the National Register of Historic Places ==
- Fisher Park National Register Historic District
