= Ethel Clay Price =

American socialite and nurse (1874–1943)

- Born: Ethel Clay; October 2, 1874; New York City, New York; U.S.
- Died: October 26, 1943 (aged 69); Greensboro, North Carolina; U.S.
- Resting place: Green Hill Cemetery
- Education: Notre Dame Academy; Watts Hospital Training School for Nurses
- Occupations: nurse, socialite, philanthropist
- Spouse: Julian Price
- Children: 2 (including Kathleen Price Bryan)
- Parents: Henry de Boisfeuillet Clay (father); Harriet Field (mother)
- Relatives: Joseph M. Bryan (son-in-law); Nancy Bryan Faircloth (granddaughter)

Ethel Clay Price (October 2, 1874 – October 26, 1943) was an American nurse and socialite. She was the first graduate from Watts Hospital Training School for Nurses in Durham, obtaining her nursing degree in 1897. She was married to insurance executive Julian Price and was the mother-in-law of the businessman Joseph M. Bryan. Price lived at Hillside, a large mansion she and her husband had built in Greensboro, North Carolina. A devout Catholic, Our Lady of Grace Catholic Church in Greensboro was built as a memorial to her. A scholarship at the Watts Nursing School and a scholarship at Notre Dame of Maryland University are named after her.

== Biography ==
Price was born in New York City on October 2, 1874, to Colonel Henry de Boisfeuillet Clay, a U.S. Infantry officer and Civil War veteran, and Harriet Field. A convert to the Catholic faith, Price was an ardent devotee to the Blessed Virgin Mary.

She studied at Notre Dame Academy in Baltimore before moving to Durham, North Carolina to attend Watts Hospital Training School for Nurses. She was the school's first graduate in 1897 and worked as a nurse at Watts Hospital.

On August 22, 1897, she married insurance businessman Julian Price at Mechum River Farm in Virginia. They had two children, Kathleen Marshall Clay and Ralph Clay. Her daughter, Kathleen, married businessman Joseph M. Bryan. Price and her husband built Hillside, a large mansion in Fisher Park. Although her husband was Baptist, Price remained a devout Catholic. In the 1930s, she would host Fr. Vincent Taylor, a visiting priest from Belmont Abbey who celebrated mass at St. Benedict Catholic Church, and had him at Hillside for dinner along with her husband's two Catholic secretaries.

== Death and legacy ==
Price died in Greensboro on October 26, 1943. After her death, her husband provided the funding for the construction of Our Lady of Grace Catholic Church as a memorial to her in honor of her Catholic faith. Her children contributed an additional gift of $300,000 for the construction of the church. The church, completed in 1952, is also called the Mrs. Julian Price Memorial.

In 1964, the Ethel Clay Price Scholarship was created at the Watts School of Nursing. In 1982, her son endowed the Ethel Clay Price Scholarship for Continuing Education at Notre Dame of Maryland University.
