= Van Noppen =

van Noppen is a Dutch surname. Notable people with the surname include:

- Addie Donnell Van Noppen (1870–1964), American historian
- Flor Van Noppen (born 1956), Belgian politician
- Joëlle van Noppen (1980–2010), Dutch singer
