= Nancy Bryan Faircloth =

American heiress and philanthropist (1930–2010)

- Born: Nancy Anne Bryan; October 15, 1930; New York City, New York, U.S.
- Died: January 15, 2010 (aged 79); Raleigh, North Carolina, U.S.
- Education: Salem Academy; Hollins College
- Occupation: philanthropist
- Spouse: Lauch Faircloth (m. 1967; div. 1986)
- Children: 1
- Parent(s): Joseph M. Bryan (father); Kathleen Price (mother)
- Relatives: Ethel Clay Price (grandmother); Julian Price (grandfather)

Nancy Anne Bryan Faircloth (October 15, 1930 – January 15, 2010) was an American heiress and philanthropist. She worked as a researcher for the global business magazine Fortune in New York from 1952 to 1967, when she returned to North Carolina to marry the politician Lauch Faircloth. During their marriage, her husband served as the Chairman of the North Carolina State Highway Commission and the North Carolina Secretary of Commerce.

She served on the board of trustees of the North Carolina Symphony and became the chairwoman in 1981. Faircloth started the Stewards Fund, a charitable foundation, which she ran until she was succeeded by her daughter in 2000. Following her death in 2010, The Anonymous Trust was created from her estate with $181 million. In 2021, the trust was worth $285 million in assets and was one of the twenty largest foundations in North Carolina.

== Early life and family ==
Faircloth was born Nancy Anne Bryan on October 15, 1930, in New York City to insurance executive Joseph McKinley Bryan and the heiress Kathleen Marshall Clay Price. She was the granddaughter of the insurance executive Julian Price, who developed the Jefferson Standard Life Insurance Company, and the socialite Ethel Clay Price.

Her family moved to Greensboro, North Carolina in 1931, where her father took a job at her grandfather's insurance company. They lived in a mansion in the Irving Park Historic District. She attended Salem Academy, an all-girls boarding school in Winston-Salem. Faircloth graduated from Hollins College in 1952.

== Career and philanthropy ==
Soon after graduating from Hollins, Faircloth was hired as a researcher with the editorial staff of Fortune, a global business magazine based in New York. She worked at Fortune until 1967 when she moved back to North Carolina.

She served on the board of trustees for the North Carolina Symphony but, in the 1970s, left due to a disagreement with spending policies. Faircloth rejoined the symphony's board, and took over as chairwoman, in 1981.

Faircloth established the Stewards Fund, a charitable foundation that gifted over $70 million. She ran the Fund until 2000, when her daughter succeeded her. She and her siblings managed the Kathleen Price and Joseph M. Bryan Family Foundation, founded by her parents.

== Personal life ==
In 1967, she married the farmer and political consultant Duncan McLauchlin "Lauch" Faircloth in a private ceremony, officiated by Rev. Dr. John Redhead of First Presbyterian Church of Greensboro, in the garden of her family home. She was Faircloth's second wife, as he had previously been married to Lady Lynn Talton. During their marriage, her husband served as the Chairman of the North Carolina State Highway Commission and the North Carolina Secretary of Commerce. The Faircloths had one daughter, Anne, who would later become a writer for Fortune, as her mother did. Faircloth and her husband divorced in 1986.

== Death and legacy ==
Faircloth died on January 15, 2010, at her home in Raleigh, North Carolina. Her funeral was held on January 23, 2010, at Alliance Medical Ministry.

Following her death, The Anonymous Trust was created from her estate and was worth $181 million. The Trust, which had $285 million in assets in 2021 and ranks among North Carolina's twenty largest foundations, was created to provide financial aid for various causes in North Carolina. The trust granted $7.2 million to North Carolina State University's School of Education and $5.9 million to Fayetteville State University, as well as $15 million to other public colleges in eastern North Carolina.
