= John Adams Gilmer =

American politician (1805–1868)

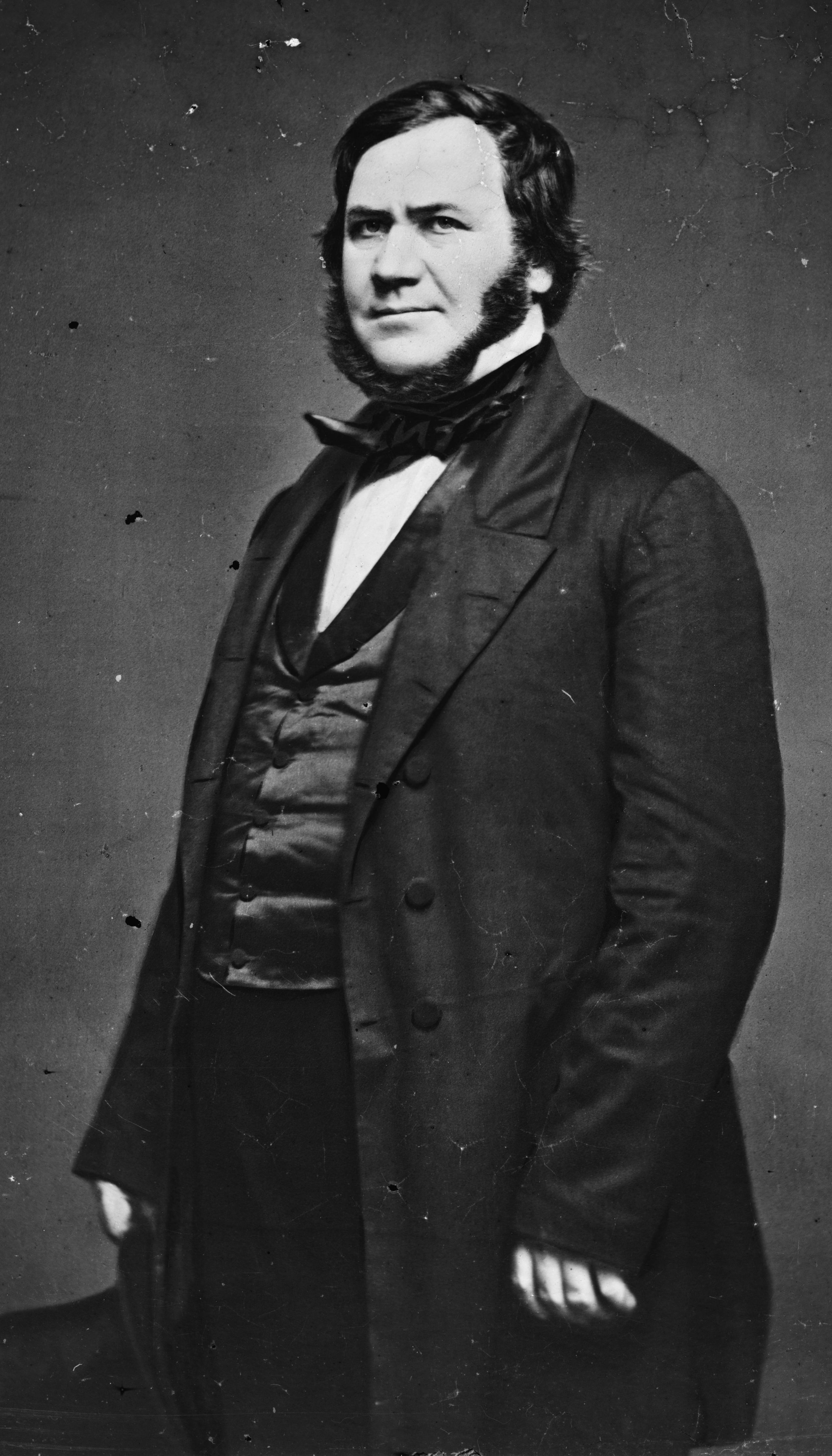
- Portrait of Gilmer

Member of the U.S. House of Representatives from North Carolina's 5th district
- In office 1857–1861
- Preceded by: Edwin G. Reade
- Succeeded by: Civil War

Personal details
- Born: November 4, 1805 near Greensboro, North Carolina, U.S.
- Died: May 14, 1868 (aged 62) Greensboro, North Carolina, U.S.
- Resting place: Old First Presbyterian Church Cemetery
- Party: Whig; American Party; Opposition Party
- Spouse: Juliana Paisley (m. 1832)
- Relations: Jeremy Francis Gilmer (brother)
- Children: 1
- Occupation: Politician; lawyer

John Adams Gilmer (November 4, 1805 – May 14, 1868) was a Congressional Representative from North Carolina.

== Early life ==
John Adams Gilmer was born on November 4, 1805, near Alamance Church in Greensboro, Guilford County, North Carolina, to Anne (née Forbes) and Robert Shaw Gilmer. His parents came from Ireland to North Carolina via Pennsylvania. His father was a farmer and wheelwright.

Gilmer attended the public schools and an academy in Greensboro. After receiving his education, the 17-year-old Gilmer taught school. At the age of 19, he entered the Eli W. Caruthers Academy in Greensboro. After two years at Curuthers, he taught at a grammar school in Laurens County. He then studied law with Archibald Murphey and was admitted to the bar in 1832.

== Law career ==
Gilmer began practicing law in Greensboro. His law practice allowed him to buy slaves and other property. He served as chairman of the town board of Greensboro and as the solicitor of Guilford County.

Gilmer defended chattel slavery. Much of his wealth was through his wife's inheritance, including some enslaved people. In 1850 to 1851, he led the prosecution of two Wesleyan Methodist preachers who were found guilty of disseminating abolitionist propaganda and removed them from the state. The 1860 Federal census notes that his occupations were in both law and agriculture and that he owned 53 slaves.

== Political career ==
Gilmer was elected as a Whig to the State senate in 1846 and served in the body until 1856. In 1856, he was the Whig candidate for Governor of North Carolina but was defeated. He was elected as the candidate of the American Party to the Thirty-fifth Congress and reelected as a candidate of the Opposition Party to the Thirty-sixth Congress (March 4, 1859 – March 3, 1861). During the Thirty-sixth Congress, he was the chairman of the Committee on Elections.

In January 1861, Abraham Lincoln considered him for a position in his incoming cabinet as a way to assure the Southern states of Lincoln's willingness to find a solution to the increasing tensions and threats of secession, and William H. Seward sounded him out on the question, but Gilmer temporized until the matter was dropped. In fact, Gilmer wrote the following to Stephen A. Douglas:

Had Lincoln appointed Gilmer, he would have been mightily embarrassed by that gentleman’s conduct when war finally came. On April 17, Gilmer wrote to Stephen A. Douglas: “may the God of battles crush to the earth and consign to eternal perdition , Mr. Lincoln, his cabinet and ‘aiders and abettors,’ in this cruel, needless, corrupt betrayal conservative men of the South. We would have saved the country, but for the fatuity and cowardice of this infernal Administration . . . . I hope you will not aid or countenance so detestable a parvenue .”

Gilmer served as a member of the Second Confederate Congress in 1864. In February 1865, he proposed a peace and reconstruction plan that would allow both the Union and Confederacy to keep separate identities and send representatives, He served as a delegate to the Union National Convention at Philadelphia in 1866.

== Personal life ==
Gilmer married Juliana Paisley on January 3, 1832. They had a son, John Alexander, who was a lieutenant colonel in the Confederate Army and a judge.

Gilmer died on May 14, 1868, in Greensboro. He is interred in the Old First Presbyterian Church Cemetery at the Greensboro Historical Museum.

== See also ==
- Thirty-fifth United States Congress
- Thirty-sixth United States Congress

Party political offices
First	Know Nothing nominee for Governor of North Carolina; 1856	Succeeded by None
U.S. House of Representatives
Preceded by Edwin G. Reade	Member of the U.S. House of Representatives from North Carolina's 5th congressional district March 4, 1857 – March 3, 1861	Succeeded by Civil War
