= Henry V. Murphy =

American architect

- Born: 1888; Horseheads, outside Elmira, New York
- Died: 1960 (aged 71–72); Brooklyn, New York
- Known for: Architect of many Roman Catholic buildings

Henry V. Murphy (1888–1960) was an American architect who specialized in Catholic churches and schools.

Murphy was born in the village of Horseheads, near Elmira, New York and graduated from the Pratt Institute of Architecture. He practiced from an office at 1 Hanson Place, Brooklyn, New York City

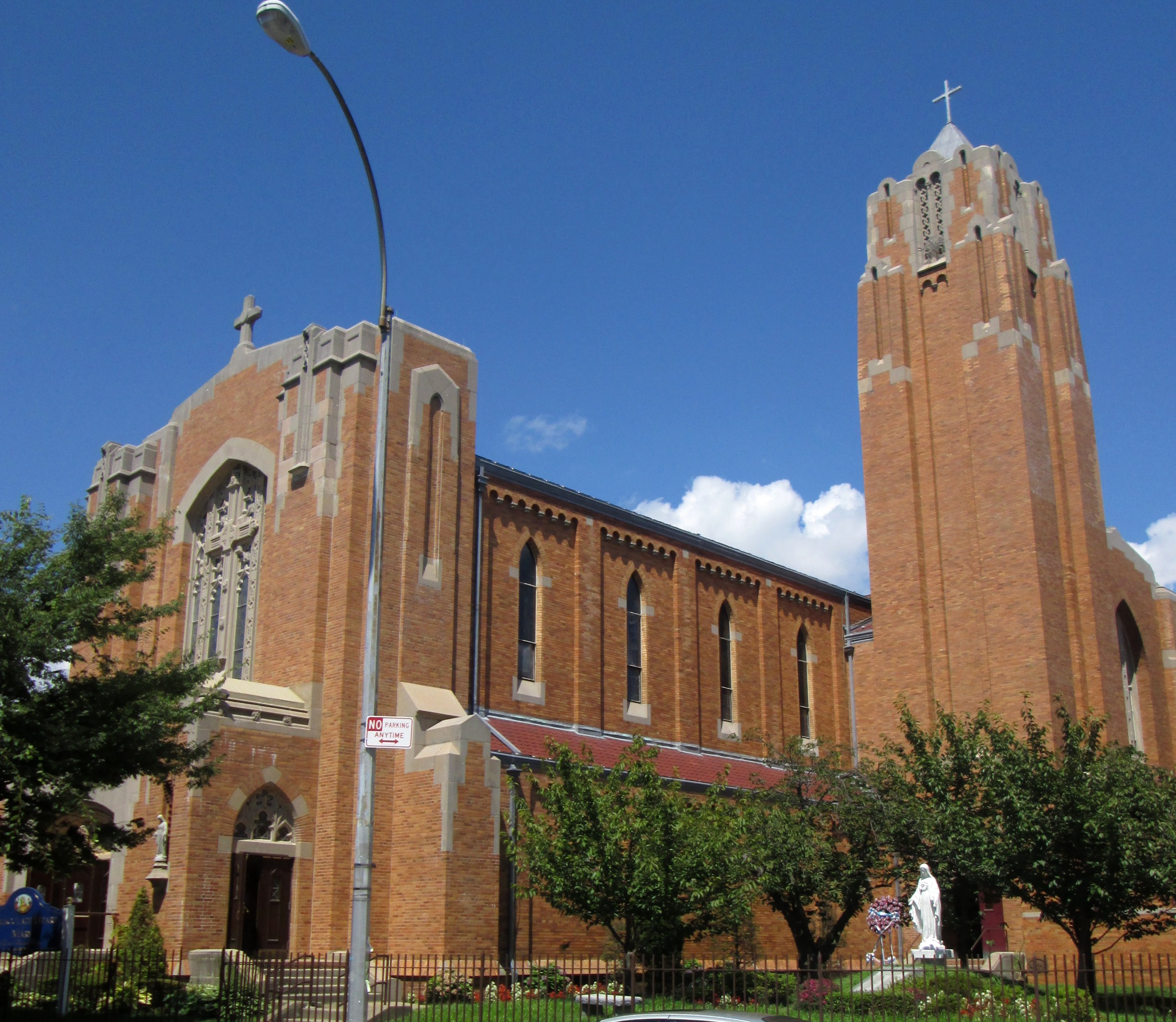
Immaculate Heart of Mary, Brooklyn

== Works ==
Perhaps Murphy's most admired achievement is the Jamaica, Queens campus of St. John's University where he created the master plan for the campus and designed the first four buildings. Although he never had an opportunity to build a church in Manhattan, his Brooklyn churches were greatly admired, which resulted in opportunities to work with Roman Catholic communities throughout the area.

- Our Lady of Refuge Church, Brooklyn, New York City
- Immaculate Heart of Mary Church, Brooklyn
- Immaculate Conception Church, Ditmars, Astoria, Queens, 1950-1955
- Shrine Church of St. Bernadette, Bay Ridge, Brooklyn, 1937
- St. Anselm's Church, Brooklyn
- St. Andrew Avellino Church, Flushing, Queens, 1940
- Resurrection Church and School, Rye, New York
- Holy Child Jesus Church, Richmond Hill, New York, 1931
- Archbishop Molloy High School, Queens
- The Mary Louis Academy, Jamaica Estates, Queens
- Xaverian High School, Brooklyn
- Holy Cross High School, Flushing, Queens
- St. Mary Mother of Jesus School, Brooklyn
- St. Athanasius' School, Brooklyn
- St. Bernadette's School, Brooklyn
- St. Patrick's School, Bay Shore, New York
- Holy Family School and Convent, Hicksville, New York
- St. James's School and Convent, Seaford, New York
- St. Raphael's School, auditorium, convent and rectory, East Meadow, New York
- Public School 120, Brooklyn
- Public School 287, Brooklyn
- Bushwick Health Center, Bushwick, Brooklyn
- Domestic Relations Courthouse, Brooklyn
- Benedictine Hospital, School of Nursing and Residence, Kingston, New York
- St. Raymond's Church, East Rockaway, New York
- St. Edward the Confessor Church, Syosset, New York
- St. Francis of Assisi Church, Norristown, Pennsylvania
- Our Lady of Grace Church, Greensboro, North Carolina
- Catholic Seaman's Institute, Carroll Gardens, Brooklyn, 1943 (not extant)
