= Green Hill Cemetery Gatekeeper's House =

Historic site in Guilford County, North Carolina

- U.S. National Register of Historic Places
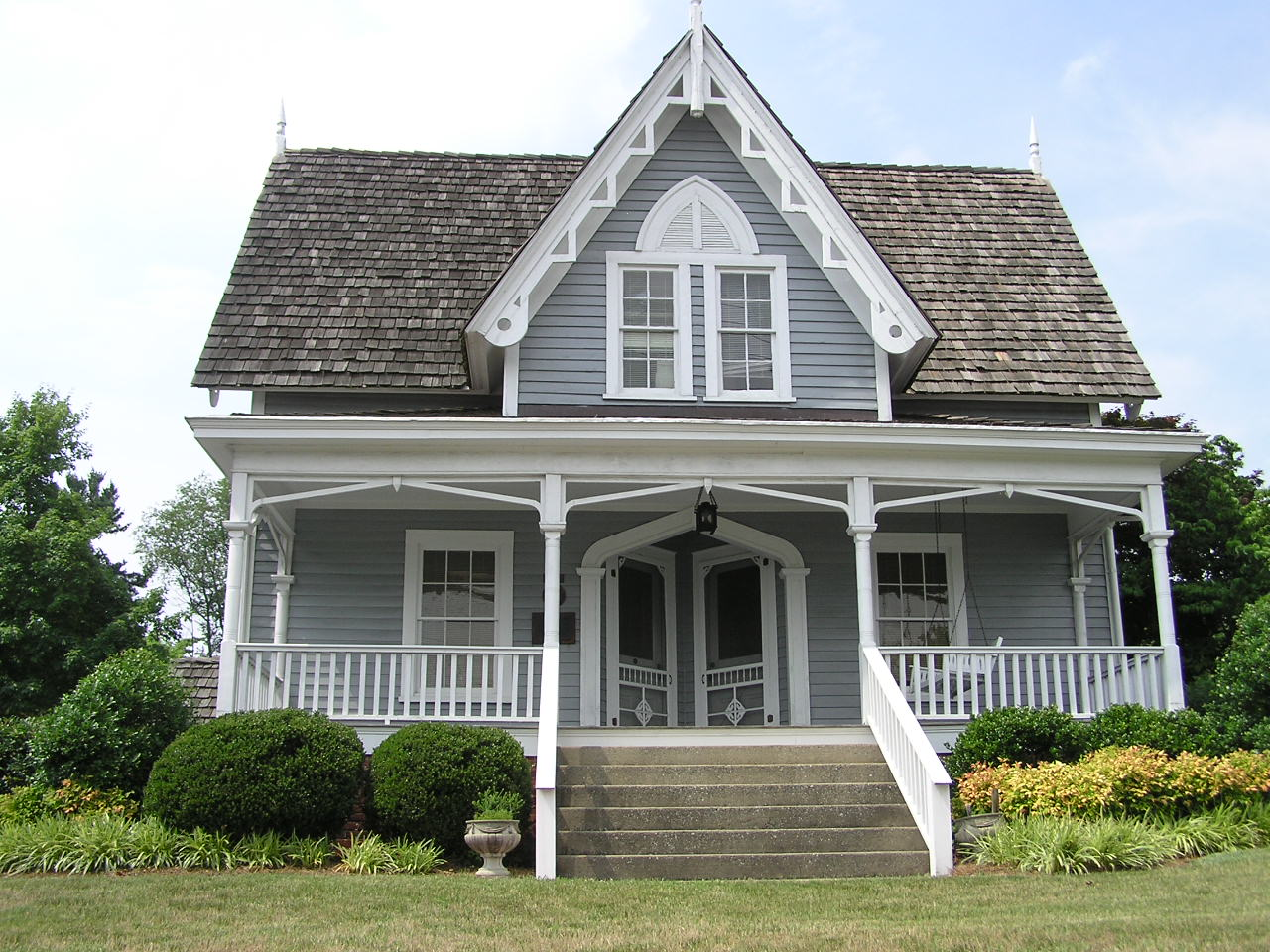
- Green Hill Cemetery Gatekeeper's House, July 2003

- Location within North Carolina Location within the United States
- Location: 700 Battleground Ave., Greensboro, North Carolina
- Coordinates: 36°4′47″N 79°47′43″W
- Area: less than one acre
- Built: 1888-1889
- Architectural style: Gothic Revival
- NRHP reference No.: 79001713
- Added to NRHP: May 29, 1979

Green Hill Cemetery Gatekeeper's House is a historic gatekeeper's house located at Green Hill Cemetery, Greensboro, Guilford County, North Carolina. It was built in 1888–1889, and is a 1 1/2-story, cross-shaped, frame structure in the Gothic Revival style. It features a steeply pitched cross-gable roof with wide overhanging eaves. It also has sawnwork bargeboards with kingposts and a full-width one-story porch.

It was listed on the National Register of Historic Places in 1979.
