= Irving Park Historic District =

Historic district in North Carolina, United States

- U.S. National Register of Historic Places
- U.S. Historic district
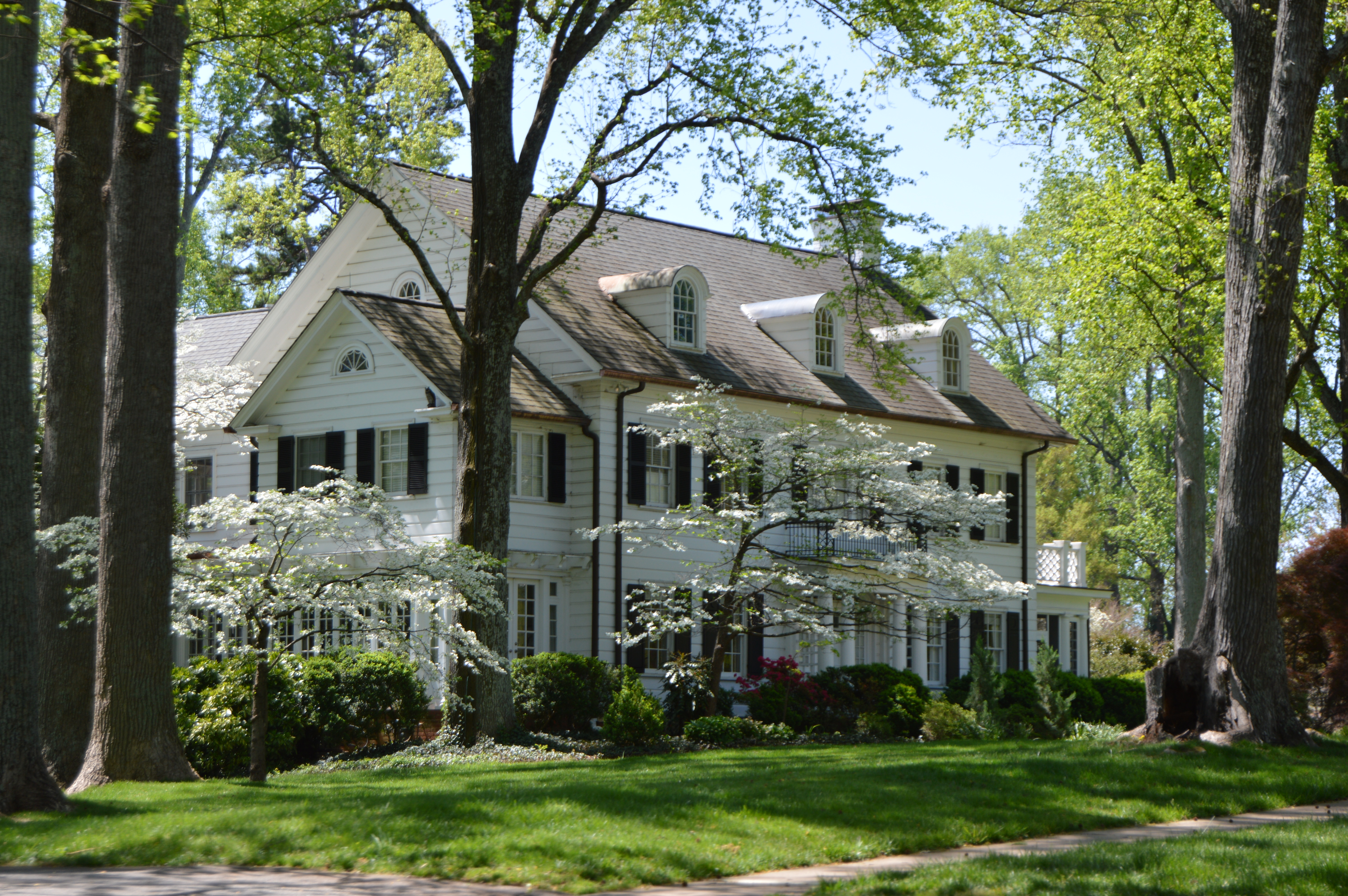
- House on Sunset Drive

- Location within North Carolina Location within the United States
- Location: Roughly bounded by Buffalo Cr., Battleground Ave., Cornwallis Dr. and W. Northwood St., Greensboro, North Carolina
- Coordinates: 36°05′47″N 79°47′54″W
- Area: 145 acres (59 ha)
- Built: 1911-1930s
- Architect: John Nolen, et al.
- Architectural style: Tudor Revival, Classical Revival, Colonial Revival
- MPS: Greensboro MPS
- NRHP reference No.: 94001050
- Added to NRHP: February 21, 1995

Irving Park Historic District is a national historic district located at Greensboro, Guilford County, North Carolina. The district encompasses 164 contributing buildings, 5 contributing sites, 2 contributing structures, and 2 contributing objects in an affluent planned suburb of Greensboro. It developed around the Greensboro Country Club. The houses were largely built between 1911 and the 1930s and include notable examples of Colonial Revival, Tudor Revival, and Classical Revival-style architecture. Notable buildings include the first Robert Jesse Mebane House, the Cummins A. Mebane House, the Lynn Williamson House, the first J. Spencer Love House, the Aubrey L. Brooks House, Carl I. Carlson House, the Van Wyck Williams House, the Lavlson L. Simmons House, the Albert J. Klutz House, the Irving Park Manor Apartments, McAdoo-Sanders-Tatum House, the Alfred M. Scales House, and the Herman Cone House.

It was listed on the National Register of Historic Places in 1995.

== Notable residents ==
- Joseph M. Bryan, insurance executive and philanthropist
- Kathleen Price Bryan, philanthropist and founder of the Junior League of Greensboro
- Nancy Bryan Faircloth, philanthropist and Chairwoman of the North Carolina Symphony
- Louis DeJoy, businessman and 75th United States Postmaster General
- Bonnie McElveen-Hunter, former U.S. Ambassador to Finland
- Aldona Wos, former U.S. Ambassador to Estonia
