= Edwin Godwin Reade =

American judge (1812–1894)

Edwin Reade
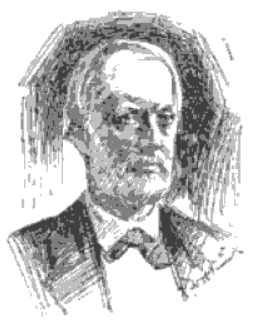

Confederate States Senator from North Carolina
- In office January 22, 1864 – February 18, 1864
- Preceded by: George Davis
- Succeeded by: William Alexander Graham

Member of the U.S. House of Representatives from North Carolina's 5th district
- In office March 4, 1855 – March 4, 1857
- Preceded by: James Clay
- Succeeded by: John Gilmer

Personal details
- Born: Edwin Godwin Reade; November 13, 1812 Person County, North Carolina, U.S.
- Died: October 18, 1894 (aged 81) Raleigh, North Carolina, U.S.
- Resting place: Oakwood Cemetery
- Party: Whig; American
- Spouse(s): Emily A. L. Moore; Mary E. Parmalee

Edwin Godwin Reade (November 13, 1812 – October 18, 1894) was a U.S. congressman from North Carolina between 1855 and 1857. He later served in the Confederate Senate during the American Civil War. He was a justice of the Supreme Court of North Carolina.

== Early life ==
Edwin Godwin Reade was born on November 13, 1812, in Person County, North Carolina. In his early life, he worked on a farm, in a carriage shop, for a blacksmith, and in a tanyard. He attended the academy of George Morrow in Orange County. He was assistant teacher in the school of reverend Alexander Wilson. He started studying law at home in 1833 and was admitted to the bar in 1835.

== Career ==
In 1835, Reade ran as a Whig for the house of commons, but lost. In 1835, he began practicing law in Roxboro. He continued practicing law until 1855. He was a member of the law firm Reade, Busbee & Busbee.

Reade served a single term in the 34th United States Congress as a member of the American Party (March 4, 1855 – March 3, 1857), and refused to run for re-election in 1856. He returned to North Carolina and became presiding justice in the county court. He remained in that role for several years. In 1860, he was elected as judge of the superior court.

During the Civil War, John A. Gilmer wrote a letter to Reade on behalf of William H. Seward to consider a cabinet position under President Abraham Lincoln. Reade declined. In 1863, Governor Zebulon Vance appointed Reade to the Confederate Senate to fill the seat of George Davis, who had resigned to become the Confederacy's Attorney General. Following the Civil War, Reade was re-appointed as judge of the superior court and remained as judge until 1866. He presided over the Reconstruction convention in 1865 in Raleigh. In 1868, he was named as associate justice of the North Carolina Supreme Court, a post he held until 1879. Following his retirement from government, Reade engaged in banking in Raleigh. He was president of the Raleigh National Bank.

== Personal life ==
Reade married Emily A. L. Moore. In 1871 or 1873, he married Mary E. (née Shaw) Parmalee, widow of Benjamin J. Parmalee. He was a Presbyterian. At the time of his death, he lived in the building of the Raleigh National Bank.

Reade died on October 18, 1894, in Raleigh. He is buried in Oakwood Cemetery in Raleigh.

U.S. House of Representatives
Preceded by John Kerr	Member of the U.S. House of Representatives from North Carolina's 5th congressional district 1855–1857	Succeeded by John Gilmer
Confederate States Senate
Preceded by George Davis	Confederate States Senator (Class 1) from North Carolina; 1864; Served alongside: William Dortch	Succeeded by William Graham
