= William Cunningham Smith =

American academic, university administrator and writer

William Cunningham Smith (1871–1943) was an American academic of English literature, university administrator, and writer.

== Life and career ==
Born in Greensboro, Smith was educated at the University of North Carolina at Chapel Hill. He attended graduate school at Harvard University and the University of Wisconsin–Madison. In 1900, he joined the State Normal and Industrial College (now the University of North Carolina at Greensboro) as a professor of English, and in 1904, he became head of the department. In 1905, Smith became Dean of the College, in 1915 Dean of the Faculty, and in 1922 Dean of the College of Liberal Arts. During his tenure at the college he was chairman of chapel and conducted devotional services. He also served as an extension lecturer.

Smith taught the men's Bible class at First Presbyterian Church of Greensboro, and gave a very popular series of lectures on Robert Browning under the auspices of the literature division of the Woman's Club of Greensboro. He also edited a memorial volume on Charles Duncan McIver, and was the author of a number of other publications, including Studies in American Authors, The Literary Study of the Bible, Christ the Teacher, and other articles and pamphlets concerning Bible study.

Smith was married to Gertrude Allen of Greensboro; they had four daughters and a son. He retired in 1941 after 41 years of active service to the college.
