= Sunset Hills Historic District =

Historic district in North Carolina, United States

- U.S. National Register of Historic Places
- U.S. Historic district
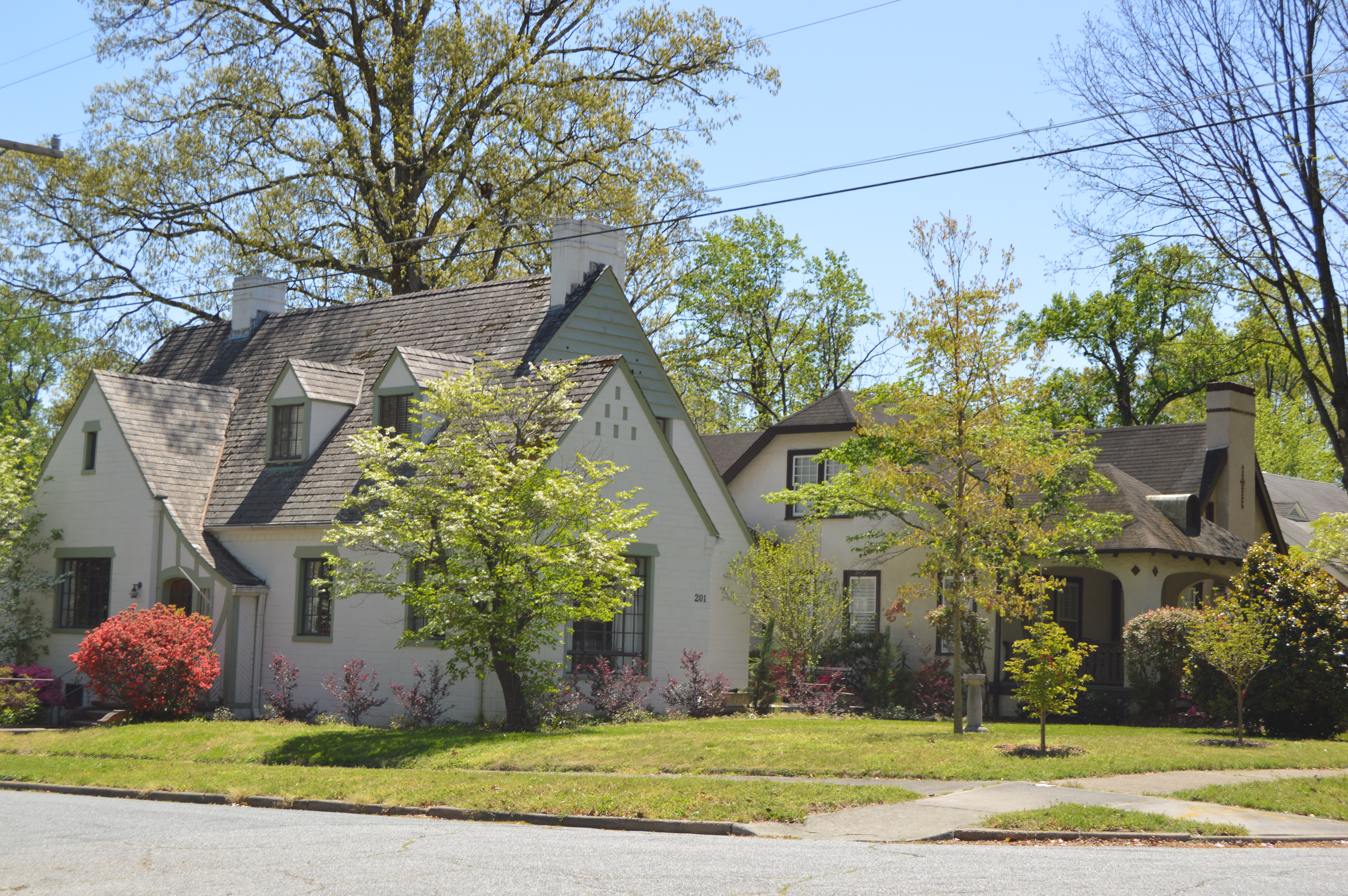
- Sylvan Road and Tremont Drive

- Location within North Carolina Location within the United States
- Location: Bounded by W. Friendly, N. & S. Elam & W. Wright Aves., S. Tremont Dr., N. Aycock St. & Kensington Rd., Greensboro, North Carolina
- Coordinates: 36°04′24″N 79°49′16″W
- Area: 280 acres (110 ha)
- Built: 1925
- Architect: Lorenzo S. Winslow, Albert C. Woodroof
- Architectural style: Colonial Revival, Tudor Revival, Bungalow/Craftsman
- NRHP reference No.: 12001179
- Added to NRHP: January 14, 2013

Sunset Hills Historic District is a national historic district located at Greensboro, Guilford County, North Carolina. The district encompasses 912 contributing buildings, 1 contributing site, and 13 contributing structures in a predominantly middle- to upper-class residential section of Greensboro. They were built between 1925 and 1965 and include notable examples of Colonial Revival architecture, Tudor Revival architecture, and Bungalow / American Craftsman architecture. Located in the district is Sunset Park.

It was listed on the National Register of Historic Places in 2013.

== Notable buildings ==
- Our Lady of Grace Catholic Church
- St. Andrew's Episcopal Church
- Ebenezer Lutheran Church
