= Chanita Hughes-Halbert =

American psychologist and medical researcher

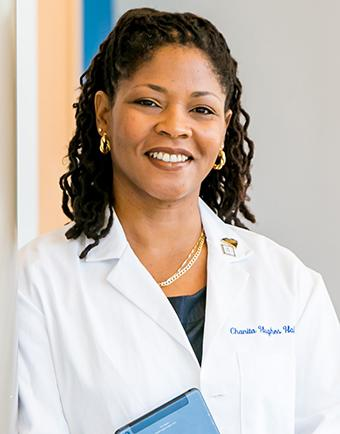
- Born: Greensboro, North Carolina, US
- Education: Hampton University (BA); Howard University (MS, PhD)
- Scientific career
- Fields: Psychology, behavioral science, cancer research, health disparities
- Workplaces: Georgetown University Medical Center; Perelman School of Medicine at the University of Pennsylvania; Medical University of South Carolina
- Doctoral advisor: Jules P. Harrell

Chanita Ann Hughes-Halbert is an American psychologist and medical researcher. She is professor of psychiatry and behavioral sciences at the Medical University of South Carolina and the AT&T Distinguished Endowed Chair for Cancer Equity at the Hollings Cancer Center. She is the first woman and first African American from South Carolina elected to the National Academy of Medicine.

== Early life and education ==
Hughes-Halbert was born and raised in Greensboro, North Carolina. She completed a B.A. in psychology at Hampton University. Hughes-Halbert earned a M.S. and Ph.D. in psychology from Howard University. Her 1995 master's thesis was titled Analysis of the Revised Neuroticism, Extraversion, and Openness Personality Inventory in the African American college sample. Her 1997 dissertation was titled Genetic testing for inherited breast-ovarian cancer susceptibility: the role of communication and personality characteristics. Jules P. Harrell was her doctoral advisor.

== Career ==
Hughes-Halbert was a junior faculty member at Georgetown University Medical Center. She was part of a small team of researches investigating health disparities in cancer prevention and control. She later worked in the department of psychiatry at Perelman School of Medicine at the University of Pennsylvania. Her research was funded by the National Institute on Minority Health and Health Disparities. She developed partnerships between academia and the community to address health issues in the African American community in the Philadelphia metro area. This included connecting Grassroots organisations to academic investigators to investigate disease prevention and evidence-based interventions. In 2007, Hughes-Halbert became the first African American woman to be promoted to associate professor with tenure in the department of psychiatry at Penn. After working at Penn for 10 years, she moved to the Hollings Cancer Center at Medical University of South Carolina (MUSC) where she is a professor in the department of psychiatry and behavioral sciences and AT&T Distinguished Endowed Chair for Cancer Equity at the Hollings Cancer Center. She is also associate dean for assessment, evaluation, and quality Improvement in the College of Medicine at MUSC.

=== Research ===
Hughes-Halbert is recognized for her cancer disparities and behavioral science research. She investigates understanding barriers to clinical trial participation in underserved communities and developing population-based interventions to reduce disparities in local settings. Her interest in minority health and health disparities is very personal for Hughes-Halbert as she lost both her mother and an aunt to cancer. She has authored over 100 peer-reviewed scientific articles.

== Awards and honors ==
Hughes-Halbert is the recipient of numerous honors and awards, including the American Cancer Society Cancer Control Award, Chair-Elect for the American Association for Cancer Research Minorities in Cancer Research Council, and the MUSC Leadership Fellowship Award. Hughes-Halbert was the first woman and first African American from South Carolina elected to join the National Academy of Medicine. In 2010, Hughes-Halbert received the American Cancer Society's Cancer Control Award and in 2017, she was elected to the National Academy of Medicine.
