= Hillside (Greensboro, North Carolina) =

Historic house in North Carolina, United States

- Hillside (Julian Price House)
- U.S. National Register of Historic Places
- U.S. Historic district – Contributing property
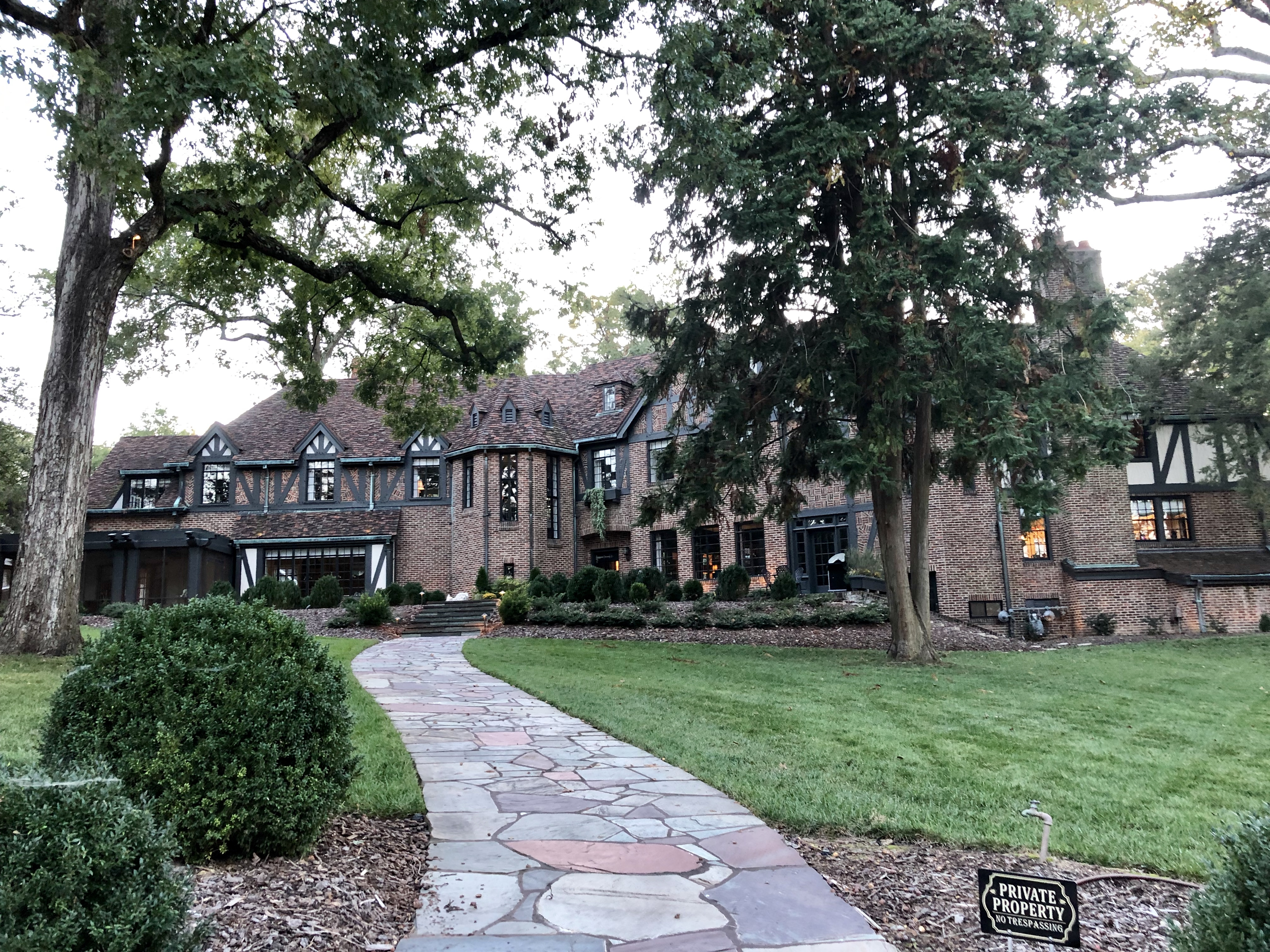
- Hillside in 2019

- Location within North Carolina Location within the United States
- Location: 301 Fisher Park Circle, Greensboro, North Carolina
- Coordinates: 36°4′32″N 79°47′34″W
- Area: 2.5 acres (1.0 ha)
- Built: 1929
- Architect: Hartmann, Charles C.
- Architectural style: Tudor Revival
- NRHP reference No.: 80002839
- Added to NRHP: February 1, 1980

Hillside, also known as the Julian Price House, is a historic mansion located in the Fisher Park neighborhood of Greensboro, North Carolina. It was built in 1929 for the insurance executive Julian Price and his wife, Ethel Clay Price.

== History ==
Hillside was designed by architect Charles C. Hartmann and built in 1929 for the businessman Julian Price and his wife, Ethel Clay Price. The house, a four-story, 31-room, 180-foot-long (55 m) dwelling in the Tudor Revival style, sits at 7,266 square feet (675 m^{2}). It has a three-story polygonal stair tower, red-brown rough fired brick, and half-timbering with tan stucco. Also on the property is a contributing rustic board-and-batten gardener's cottage.

The mansion was listed on the National Register of Historic Places in 1980. It is located in the Fisher Park Historic District.

In January 2017, the property and Sandra Cowart, an interior designer and former owner of the mansion, were featured on an episode of A&E's Hoarders. Cowart, who lived there since 1975, was an expert on the home and its architecture. She kept the home in pristine condition until her husband left her in 1979, after she refused to sell the home and have it demolished. For many years, she rented out rooms in the mansion, and gave frequent tours. Her family stated that after 2005, she rarely let anyone inside. She became a compulsive collector, and ultimately lost her business following a lawsuit, forcing her to partake in several refinancing schemes that ultimately led to the home being foreclosed. Eric and Michael Fuko-Rizzo, the new owners, were understanding, and allowed Cowart to sell and dispose of her things. She made nearly $14,000 off selling her belongings and moved into an Airstream on a friend's property after cleaning out the mansion. When asked how she felt about being forced to move, Cowart said she is "lucky" to have called Hillside home for 40 years, and hopes the new owners will enjoy it.

The Fuko-Rizzos purchased Hillside in September 2016, in a foreclosure sale. After the house was cleared of Cowart's possessions in late 2016, the Fuko-Rizzos refurbished the interior and grounds over 2017 with the assistance of Preservation Greensboro, landscape architect Chip Callaway and the University of North Carolina at Greensboro Department of Interior Architecture, among others. After the house was remodeled, the Fuko-Rizzos invited interior designers to turn the house into a gallery of contemporary interior design. The kitchen and most of the house was fully remodeled. The "designer showcase" was open from April 7, 2018, through April 29, after which the Fuko-Rizzo family occupied the house. After the fact, there were concerns raised about the nature of the showcase and whether the Fuko-Rizzo family took advantage of some participating designers. Some designers were charged fees that did not belong to them and others had their contracts changed without their knowledge - resulting in the financial and material loss of their design pieces to the Fuko-Rizzos.

== Zoning Issues (2019-present) ==
In May 2019, the Greensboro Zoning Commission initially denied the Fuko-Rizzos' application for a Special Use Permit to operate the Julian Price House as a bed and breakfast by a 4-3 vote. However, Superior Court Judge Eric Morgan overturned this decision in November 2019, ordering approval of the permit with specific conditions including no outdoor amplified music at any time, no indoor amplified music after 10 PM, and required onsite parking.

Following the SUP approval, disagreements arose over permissible uses of the property. The property owners maintained they had rights to operate under multiple zoning uses including religious assembly, parks and open spaces, and cultural/community centers, arguing these activities were not subject to SUP restrictions. City officials disputed this interpretation, explaining that such principal uses would require separate approvals and potentially physical modifications to accommodate public access safely. Planning Director Mike Kirkman stated that "we have been having this argument with Mr. Fuko Rizzo for years" and emphasized that "the City's position has been consistent on this interpretation of the ordinance."

In 2024, the City of Greensboro issued Notices of Violation for outdoor amplified music violations and operation as a special events facility. City staff indicated they had previously understood events were connected to legitimate tourist home operations, but recent activities suggested a different approach that prompted formal enforcement action.

Relations between the property owners and neighborhood representatives deteriorated over disputed claims about permitted activities and communications with city officials. FPNA representatives documented discrepancies between statements made by Michael Fuko-Rizzo and information provided by city officials regarding the frequency of communications with the city and the number of approved uses for the property. Direct dialogue ceased when the property owners declined further communication without legal representation.
