= Green Hill Cemetery (Greensboro, North Carolina) =

Cemetery in Guilford County, North Carolina

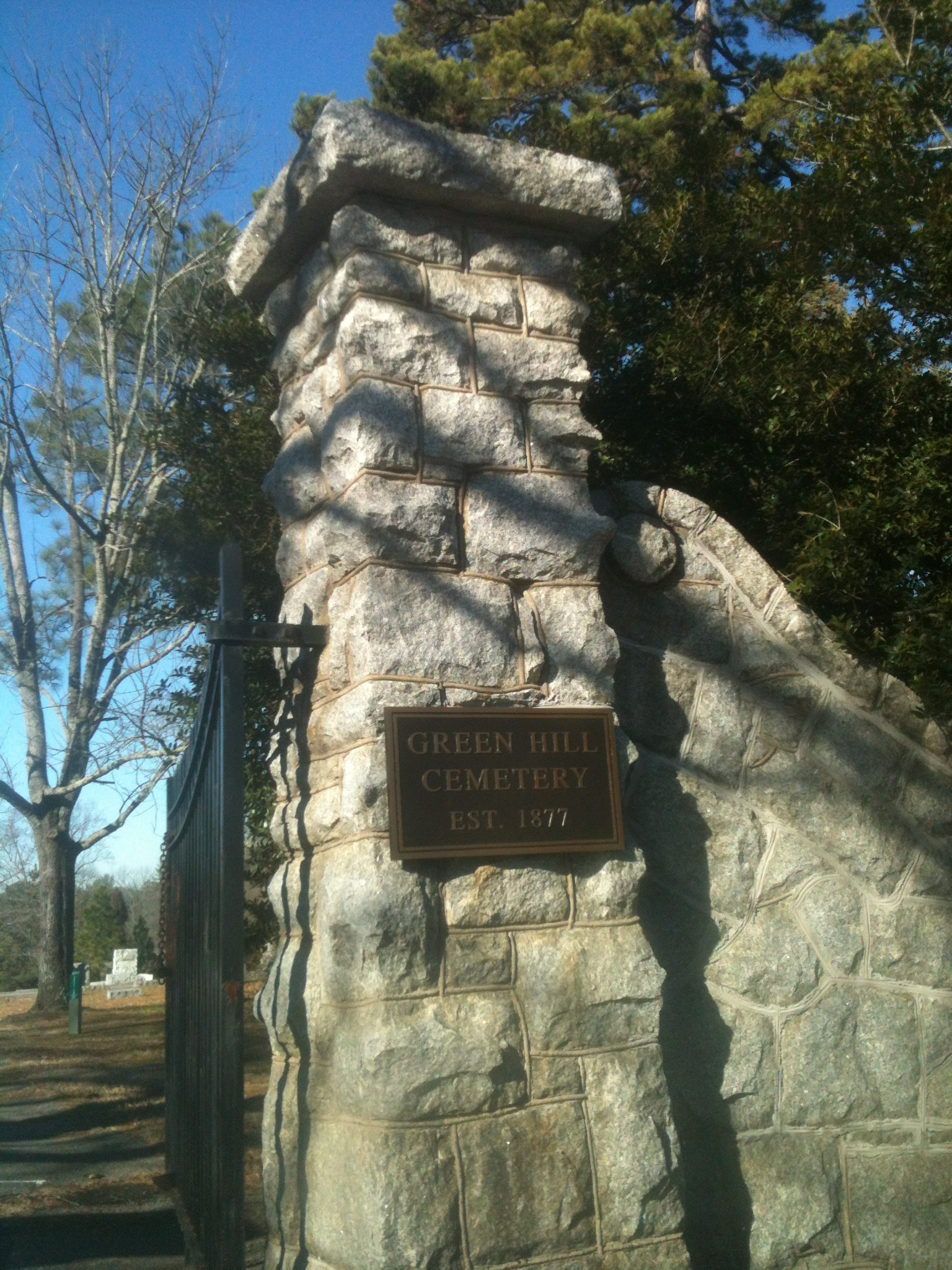
- Green Hill Cemetery gate
- Interactive map of Green Hill Cemetery

Details
- Established: 1877
- Location: 901 Wharton Street, Greensboro, North Carolina
- Country: United States
- Coordinates: 36°4′58″N 79°47′50″W; GNIS: Green Hill Cemetery
- No. of graves: ~19,000
- Website: Official website
- Find a Grave: Green Hill Cemetery

Green Hill Cemetery is located in Greensboro, North Carolina and it on 51 acres of rolling land. Opened in 1877, it is Greensboro's oldest publicly operated cemetery. The cemetery is managed by the Greensboro Parks & Recreation Department. Tours of the cemetery are held by Friends of Green Hill Cemetery, a non-profit organization. The Green Hill Cemetery Gatekeeper's House, located within the cemetery, is listed on the National Register of Historic Places.

Green Hill Cemetery is also home to a plethora of plants and more than 700 different types of trees. They are cataloged and maintained by the Friends of Green Hill Cemetery and the city of Greensboro.

The 2006 horror film, The Gravedancers, was shot at Green Hill Cemetery.

Green Hill Cemetery Map

In June 2020, a monument marking the mass grave of Confederate soldiers, owned by the Sons of Confederate Veterans, was vandalized and torn down.

== Notable burials ==
- Joseph M. Bryan (1896–1995), businessman
- Kathleen Price Bryan (1900–1984), heiress and philanthropist
- Kay Hagan (1953–2019), US Senator
- Lunsford Richardson Preyer (1919–2001), US Congressman
- Ethel Clay Price (1874–1943), nurse and socialite
- Julian Price (1867–1946), businessman
- Lucy Henderson Owen Robertson (1850–1930), academic and college president
- Alfred Moore Scales (1827–1892), Civil War general and US Congressman
- Addie Donnell Van Noppen (1870–1964), historian
