= Our Lady of Grace Catholic Church (Greensboro, North Carolina) =

Coordinates: 36.0735°N 79.8219°W

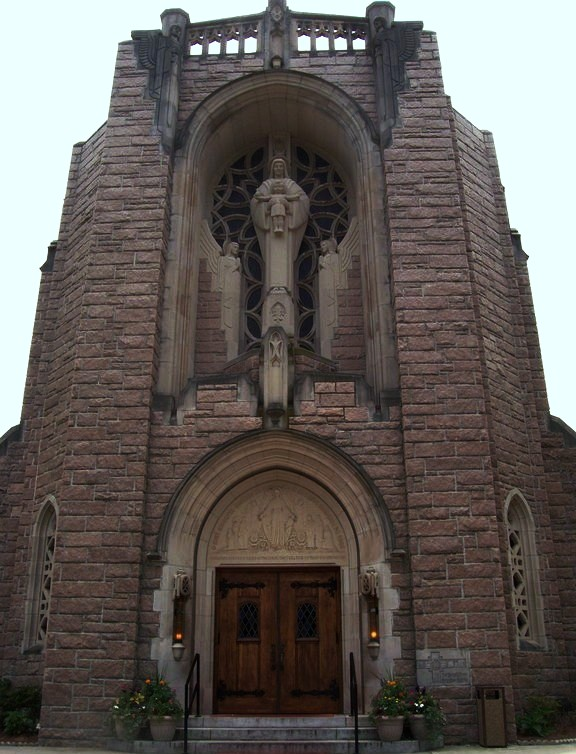

Religion
- Affiliation: Roman Catholic Church
- Diocese: Roman Catholic Diocese of Charlotte
- Rite: Latin Rite
- Leadership: Bishop Peter Joseph Jugis

Location
- Location: 2201 West Market Street, Greensboro, North Carolina, United States
- State: North Carolina
- Interactive map of Our Lady of Grace Catholic Church

Architecture
- Architect: Henry V. Murphy
- Style: Gothic Revival
- Groundbreaking: 1952

Our Lady of Grace Catholic Church is a Roman Catholic church in the Sunset Hills neighborhood of Greensboro, North Carolina. The church was erected as a memorial to Ethel Clay Price, a Catholic whose husband donated funds to build the church. The church was designed to resemble Our Lady of Refuge in Brooklyn, New York. The church is also host of Our Lady of Grace Catholic School, serving children from grades pre-k through 8.

== History ==
Before the 1950s, there was a small Catholic population in Greensboro, so a traveling priest would come and hold Mass at what is now St. Benedict's Church in downtown Greensboro. Our Lady of Grace was conceived of, and funded as, a memorial by Julian Price, a Baptist, to his deceased Catholic wife, Ethel Clay Price. Price first approached Vincent Waters, Bishop of Raleigh with his idea in 1946, which Price wished to model on the Church of Our Lady of Refuge in Brooklyn, New York. Price donated $400,000 for construction but died in a car accident before construction began.

World War II delayed construction, and costs rose; but the Price's children, Kathleen Price Bryan and Ralph Clay Price, donated an additional $300,000, permitting completion. The church's exterior walls are made of pink granite from Salisbury with Indiana limestone trim. The stained glass windows, 30,000 separate pieces, were imported from Belgium.

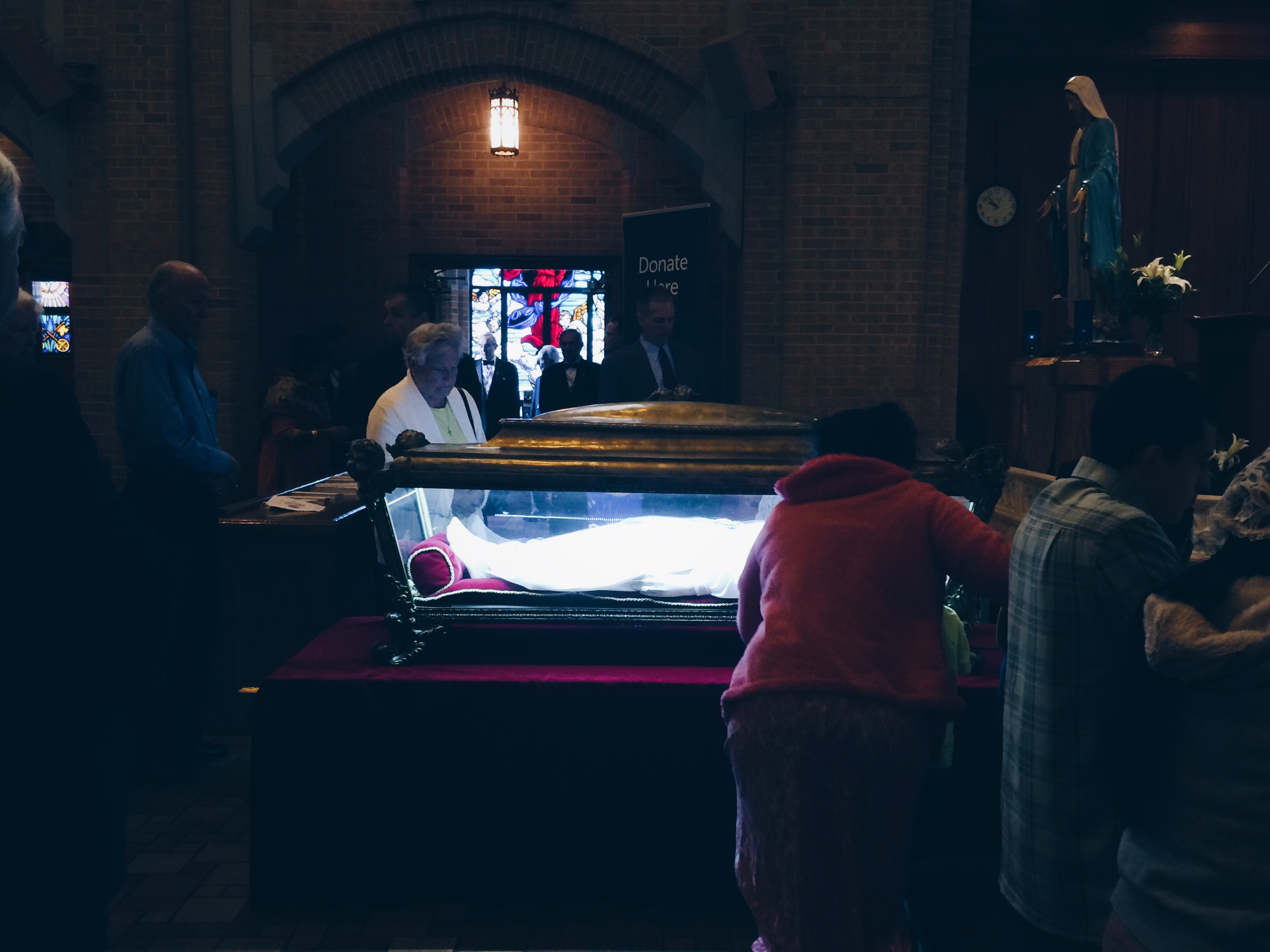
Body of St. Maria Goretti on display at Our Lady of Grace Catholic Church

The first Mass was celebrated at Our Lady of Grace on July 13, 1952. The church was dedicated on September 14, 1952 by Cardinal Amleto Giovanni Cicognani, the Apostolic Delegate to the United States. Charles H. Helmsing, Auxiliary Bishop of St. Louis, preached the dedication sermon.

The Jubilee Pipe Organ, a 2,226 pipe Kleuker organ, was dedicated on the 25th anniversary of the church, in October 1977.

== Notable parish staff ==
- Charles Borromeo McLaughlin, first Bishop of St. Petersburg, was the 3rd pastor
- Michael Joseph Begley, first Bishop of Charlotte, was the 5th pastor
