= Psychometrics of racism =

Study of effects of racism on well-being

Psychometrics of racism measures the effects of racism on the psychological well-being of people of all races. At present, there are few instruments that attempt to capture the experience of racism in all of its complexity.

== Self-reported inventories ==
The Schedule of Racist Events (SRE) is questionnaire for assessing frequency of racial discrimination in lives of African Americans created in 1998 by Hope Landrine and Elizabeth A. Klonoff. SRE is an 18-item self-report inventory, assesses frequency of specific racist events in past year and in one's entire life, and measures to what extent this discrimination was stressful.

Other psychometric tools for assessing the impacts of racism include:

- The Racism Reaction Scale (RRS)
- Perceived Racism Scale (PRS)
- Index of Race-Related Stress (IRRS)
- Racism and Life Experience Scale-Brief Version (RaLES-B)
- Telephone-Administered Perceived Racism Scale (TPRS)

== Physiological metrics ==
In a summary of recent research Jules P. Harrell, Sadiki Hall, and James Taliaferro describe how a growing body of research has explored the impact of encounters with racism or discrimination on physiological activity. Several of the studies suggest that higher blood pressure levels are associated with the tendency not to recall or report occurrences identified as racist and discriminatory. In other words, failing to recognize instances of racism is directly impacted by the blood pressure of the person experiencing the racist event. Investigators have reported that physiological arousal is associated with laboratory analogues of ethnic discrimination and mistreatment.

== See also ==
- Race and health
- Stereotype threat
- White guilt
