= Lucy Henderson Owen Robertson =

American educator and college president

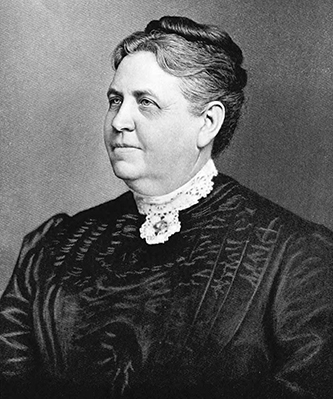
- 1906 etching of Robertson

President of Greensboro Female College
- In office 1902–1913

Personal details
- Born: Lucy Henderson Owen; September 15, 1850 Warrenton, North Carolina, U.S.
- Died: May 28, 1930 (aged 79) Greensboro, North Carolina, U.S.
- Resting place: Green Hill Cemetery
- Spouse: David A. Robertson
- Children: 2
- Education: Chowan Baptist Institute
- Occupation: educator

Lucy Henderson Owen Robertson (September 15, 1850 – May 28, 1930) was an American educator who, as the president of Greensboro Female College, was the first woman to serve as a college president in the Southern United States.

== Early life and education ==
Robertson was born Lucy Henderson Owen on September 15, 1850, in Warrenton, North Carolina to Henry Lyne Owen, a merchant, and Catherine Rebecca Watkins Owen. She grew up in Warrenton, Chapel Hill, and Hillsborough.

She was educated at Miss Nash and Kollock's School for Young Ladies in Hillsborough and went on to attend Chowan Baptist Institute in Murfreesboro, where her uncle served as president, graduating from the latter in 1869.

== Career ==
Robertson was hired as an assistant in the literary department at Greensboro Female College in 1878 and by 1890, she was serving as head of the college's English literature and language department. She left Greensboro Female College in 1893 to take on a post as the head of the history department at the State Normal and Industrial College for Girls. In 1900, she returned to Greensboro Female College to teach history and serve as lady principal. In 1902, she was unanimously elected as president of Greensboro Female College by the board of trustees, becoming the first woman college president in the Southern United States and the head of the second oldest state chartered American women's college. Robertson served as president until her retirement in 1913, at which time she was named president emerita.

In her retirement, she taught bible studies and religious education at the Greensboro Female Academy.

== Personal life ==
On November 1, 1869, she married Dr. David A. Robertson, with whom she had two sons, Charles Henderson Robertson and David William Robertson. Her husband died in 1883.

She was a member of the Methodist Episcopal Church, South and was involved in the Woman's Club of Greensboro, the United Daughters of the Confederacy, the Woman's Christian Temperance Union, the Women's Foreign Missionary Society of Greensboro, and the Women's Foreign Missionary Society of North Carolina. She also served as president of the United Society of Foreign and Home Missions.

Robertson died on May 28, 1930, at the Greensboro College infirmary and was buried in Green Hill Cemetery.
