= Latham-Baker House =

Historic house in North Carolina, United States

- U.S. National Register of Historic Places
- U.S. Historic district – Contributing property
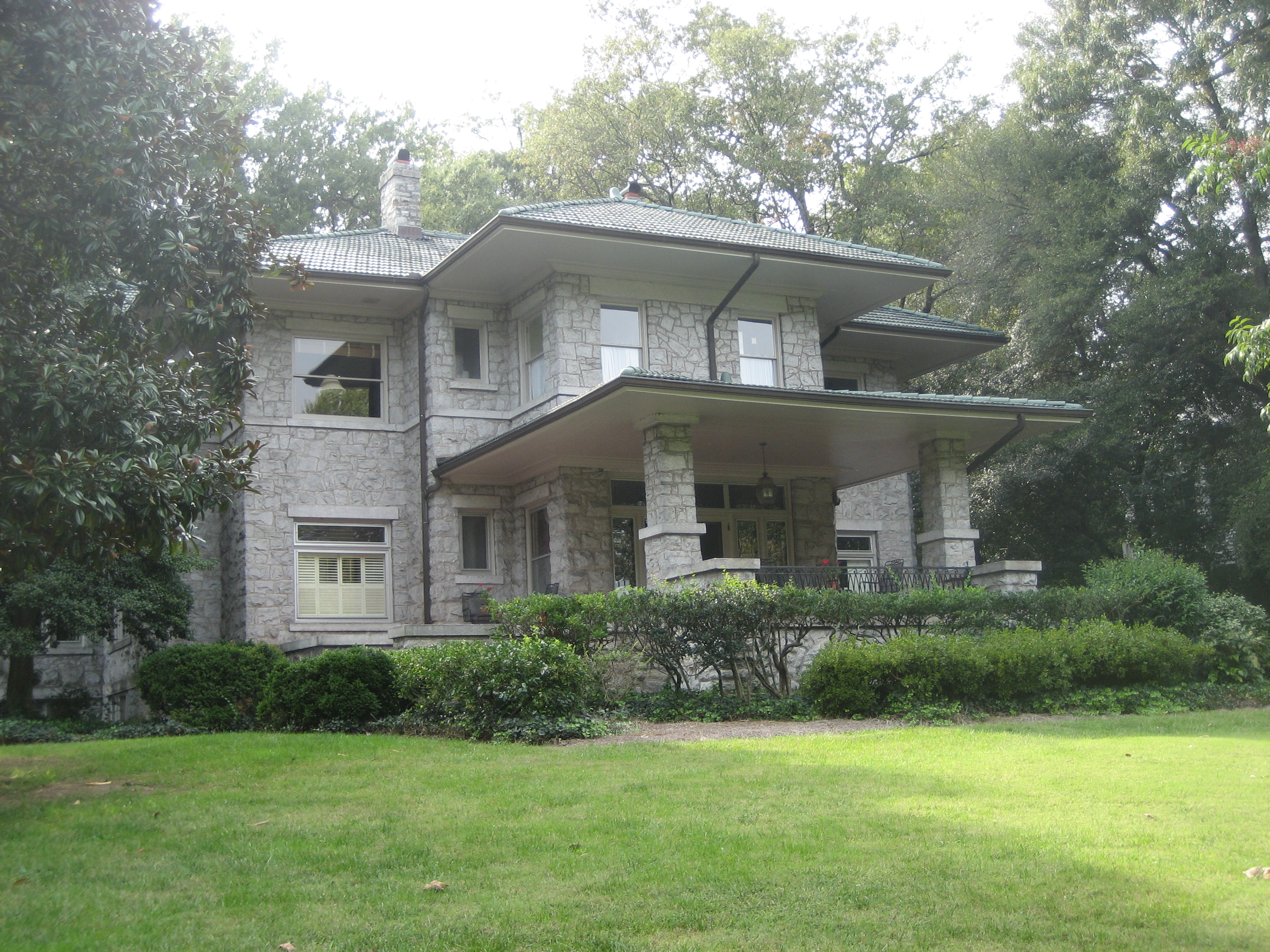
- Latham-Baker House, September 2012

- Location within North Carolina Location within the United States
- Location: 412 Fisher Park Circle, Greensboro, North Carolina
- Coordinates: 36°4′56″N 79°47′30″W
- Area: 1.9 acres (0.77 ha)
- Built: 1913
- Built by: Schlosser, Andrew Leopold
- Architect: Brewer, Wells L.
- Architectural style: Prairie School
- NRHP reference No.: 82001298
- Added to NRHP: November 12, 1982

Latham-Baker House is a historic home located at Greensboro, Guilford County, North Carolina. It was built in 1913, and is a two-story, Prairie School style dwelling. It has a low-pitched hip roof, broad, projecting eaves, and green terra cotta tile roof. An addition was constructed about 1916. Also on the property is a contributing carriage house, or three-car garage.

It was listed on the National Register of Historic Places in 1982. It is located in the Fisher Park Historic District.
