= Dixon-Leftwich-Murphy House =

Historic house in North Carolina, United States

- U.S. National Register of Historic Places
- U.S. Historic district – Contributing property
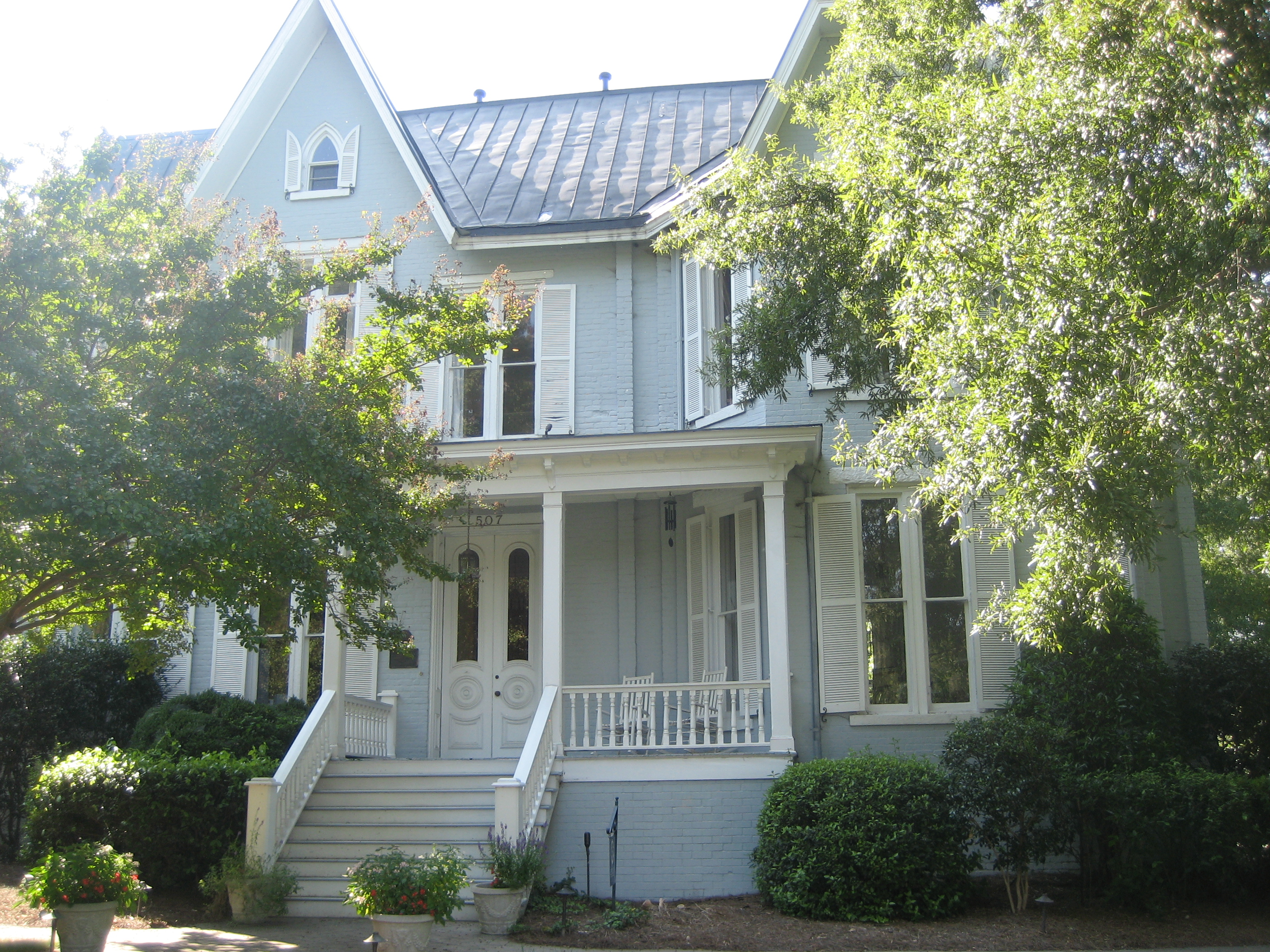
- Dixon-Leftwich-Murphy House, September 2012

- Location within North Carolina Location within the United States
- Location: 507 Church St., Greensboro, North Carolina
- Coordinates: 36°4′46″N 79°47′13″W
- Area: 0.5 acres (0.20 ha)
- Built: c. 1870-1875
- Architectural style: Italianate, Gothic Revival
- NRHP reference No.: 82003457
- Added to NRHP: September 23, 1982

Dixon-Leftwich-Murphy House, also known as the Leftwich House, is a historic home located at Greensboro, Guilford County, North Carolina. It was built between 1870 and 1875, and consists of an original two-story, three-bay Gothic Revival-style main brick block; a brick addition; and a gabled two-story frame rear addition. It has Italianate style details, a complex hipped roof with steep cross gables, a brick front porch added about 1920, and an enclosed two-tier rear porch.

It was listed on the National Register of Historic Places in 1982. It is located in the Fisher Park Historic District.
