= Holy Trinity Episcopal Church (Greensboro, North Carolina) =

Coordinates: 36.079644°N 79.79133°W

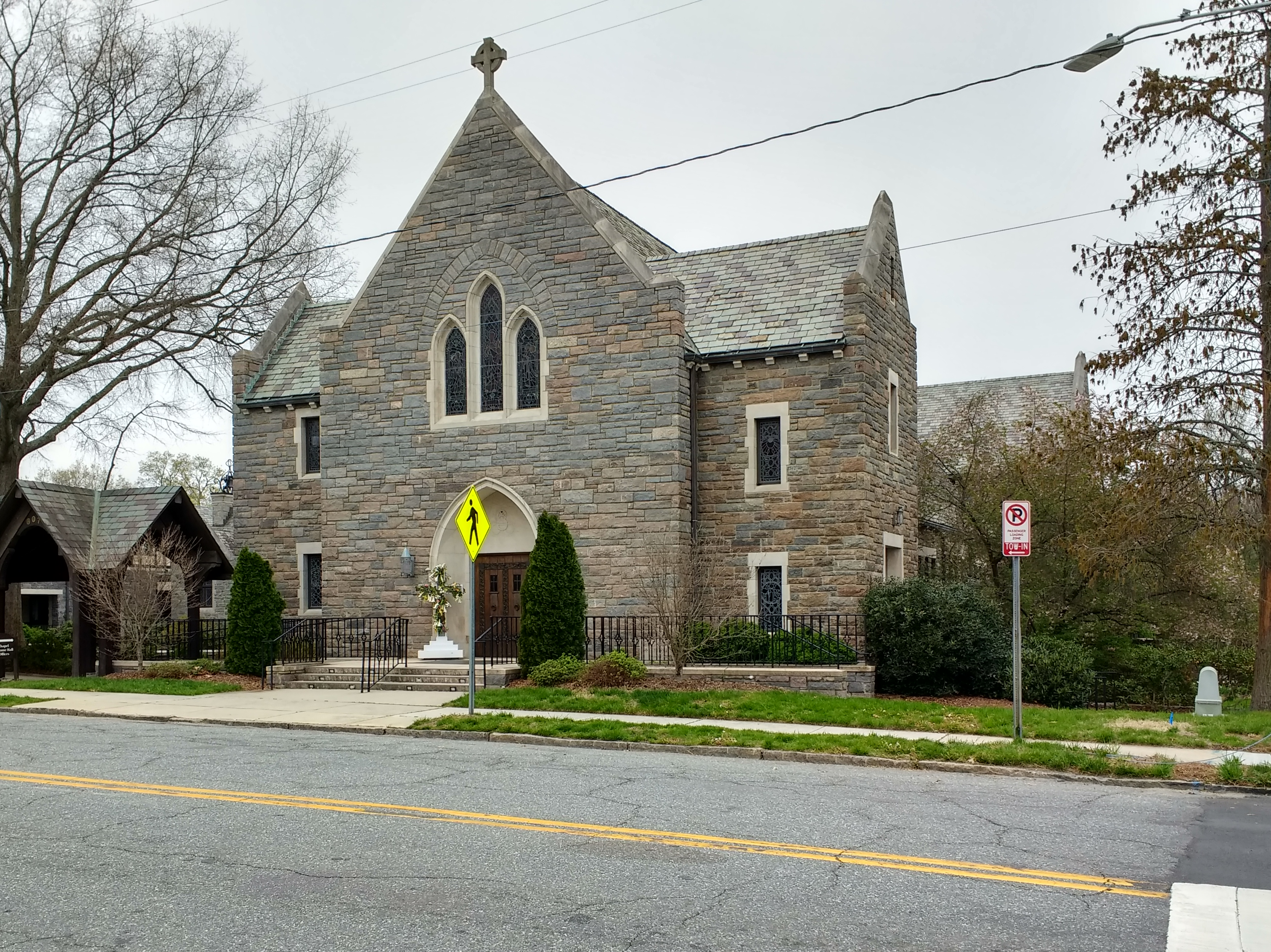

Religion
- Affiliation: Episcopal Church (United States)
- District: Episcopal Diocese of North Carolina
- Province: Province IV
- Leadership: Bishop Michael Bruce Curry

Location
- Location: 607 N Greene St, Greensboro, North Carolina, United States 27401
- State: North Carolina
- Interactive map of Holy Trinity Episcopal Church

Architecture
- Architect: Hobart Upjohn
- Style: Gothic Revival

Website
- www.holy-trinity.com

Holy Trinity Episcopal Church is an Episcopal parish located in the Fisher Park Historic District of Greensboro, North Carolina.

== History ==
The origins of Holy Trinity Episcopal Church trace back to 1869, when St. Barnabas Church was established as Greensboro's first Episcopal parish. Construction of St. Barnabas's first church building began on May 31, 1871, on a site now occupied by the Elon University School of Law.

In 1891, a group of parishioners separated from St. Barnabas to establish St. Andrew's Episcopal Mission, which became an independent parish in 1893. In May 1910, the two parishes merged to form Holy Trinity Episcopal Church. The unified congregation worshiped at St. Barnabas for two years before separating once again, resulting in the reestablishment of St. Andrew's Episcopal Church and the continued existence of Holy Trinity Episcopal Church as distinct parishes.

A parish house designed by architect Hobart Upjohn was constructed in 1919 at the present location at the intersection of Greene Street and Fisher Avenue. In 1930, the building's assembly hall was converted into All Saints Chapel. Construction of the current sanctuary began in 1949, funded through contributions from parishioners. Additional building and renovation projects were undertaken during the 1960s and 1990s.
