= Jules P. Harrell =

Camara Jules P. Harrell (born November 19, 1949), also known as Jules P. Harrell, is a professor of psychology at Howard University and a researcher in the field of the effects of stress and racism on the health of African Americans.

== Biography ==
Jules Harrell was born on November 19, 1949, in Helena, Montana. Harrell attended Carroll College and earned his Ph.D. in clinical psychology from the University of Illinois at Urbana-Champaign.

== Academic career ==
Harrell has been a professor of clinical psychology at Howard University for 30 years. In 2008, Harrell won the Exemplary Mentoring Award from Howard University's Faculty Senate. Harrell's research interests include psychometrics and psychology of racism, personality theories, assessment, and research, and psychophysiology. Much of Harrell's research examines the effect of racism as a stressor to African Americans, resulting in poorer health.

== Publications ==
Harrell's 1999 book, Manichean Psychology: Racism and the Minds of People of African Descent, underscores the psychological detriments of racism on African Americans. An article of Harrell's, "Multiple pathways linking racism to health outcomes," shows that racism causes poor health through cognitive, neural, affective, and prenatal pathways. The article serves as a call to action for policymakers to remedy structural racism. Other research of Harrell's studies the different coping strategies employed by families of children with sickle cell disease.
