= Addie Donnell Van Noppen =

American historian

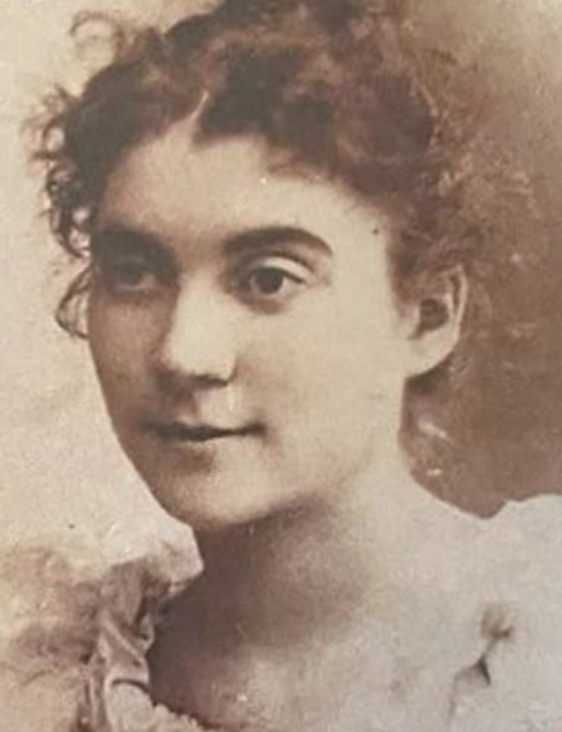

State Historian, North Carolina Society of the Daughters of the American Revolution
- In office 1901–1907

Regent of the Guilford Battle Chapter of the Daughters of the American Revolution

Personal details
- Born: Addie Cabe Donnell; March 29, 1870 Guilford County, North Carolina, U.S.
- Died: January 9, 1964 (aged 93) Greensboro, North Carolina, U.S.
- Resting place: Green Hill Cemetery
- Spouse: Charles Leonard Van Noppen
- Children: 4
- Occupation: historian, clubwoman

Addie Cabe Donnell Van Noppen (March 29, 1870 – January 9, 1964) was an American historian and civic leader. She was the organizing regent of the Guilford Battle Chapter of the Daughters of the American Revolution and served as the North Carolina DAR's State Historian from 1901 to 1907. In 1915, she authored The Battle Field of Guilford Court House.

== Biography ==
Van Noppen was born Addie Cabe Donnell on March 29, 1870 to George Donnell and Sarah Jane Caldwell Donnell. She was a great-granddaughter of Congressman William Davidson.

She was the organizing chapter regent of the Guilford Battle Chapter of the Daughters of the American Revolution. She served as the State Historian of the North Carolina Society of the Daughters of the American Revolution from 1901 to 1907.

Van Noppen authored the booklet The Battle Field of Guilford Court House, the first edition published in 1915 and the second edition published in 1927, to commemorate the tenth anniversary of the battle field becoming Guilford Courthouse National Military Park.

In 1896, she married Charles Leonard Van Noppen, a Dutch-born businessman, publisher, and political reformer. They had four children.

She died on January 9, 1964 and was buried in Green Hill Cemetery.
