= Mechum River Farm =

Historic house in Virginia, United States

- U.S. National Register of Historic Places
- Virginia Landmarks Register
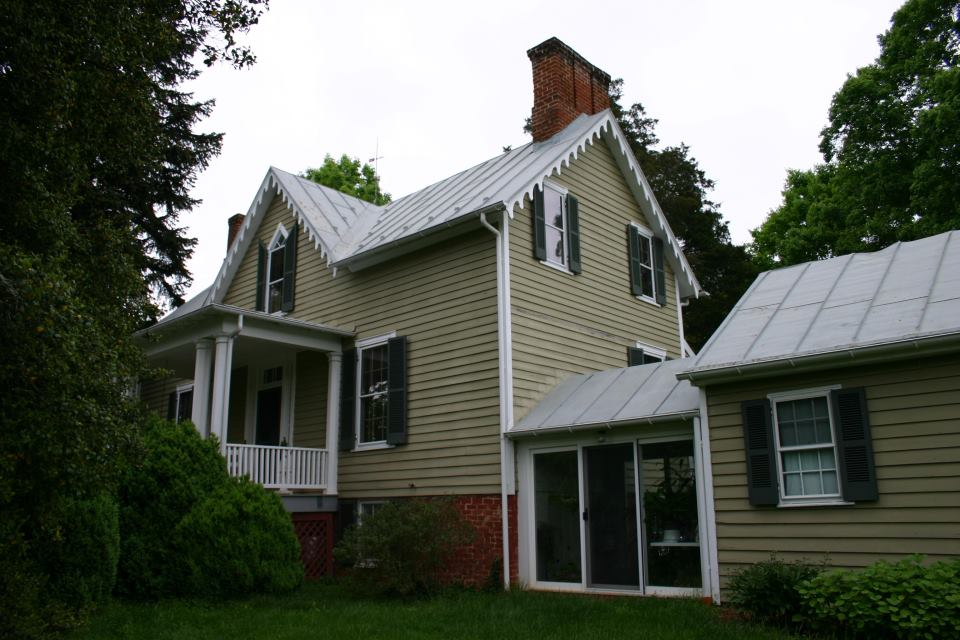
- Front and side of the farmhouse

- Location within Virginia Location within the United States
- Location: 1207 Burchs Creek Rd., near Charlottesville, Virginia
- Coordinates: 38°00′32″N 78°43′11″W
- Area: 21.6 acres (8.7 ha)
- Built: 1820
- Architectural style: Gothic Revival
- NRHP reference No.: 07000235
- VLR No.: 002-1632

Significant dates
- Added to NRHP: March 29, 2007
- Designated VLR: December 6, 2006

Mechum River Farm is an historic manor house and farm located near Charlottesville, Albemarle County, Virginia. The original house was built about 1820 presumably by a Burch family member, then updated and expanded about 1850 in the Gothic Revival style during the ownership of John C. Burch and Lucinda E. Gay Burch. It is a 1 1/2-story, three-bay, brick hall and parlor plan dwelling set on a raised basement with a solid brick foundation and a side gable roof. It features a hipped-roof portico over the central single-leaf entry. It has a rear addition built about 1920 and an extension to that built in 1976. Also on the property are a contributing barn (c. 1900), shed (c. 1900), wood shed (c. 1920), Delco shed (c. 1900), smokehouse (c. 1820), chicken coop (c. 1850), privy (c. 1850), shed (c. 1850), and family cemetery.

It was added to the National Register of Historic Places in 2007.
