= John Marion Galloway House =

Historic house in North Carolina, United States

- U.S. National Register of Historic Places
- U.S. Historic district – Contributing property
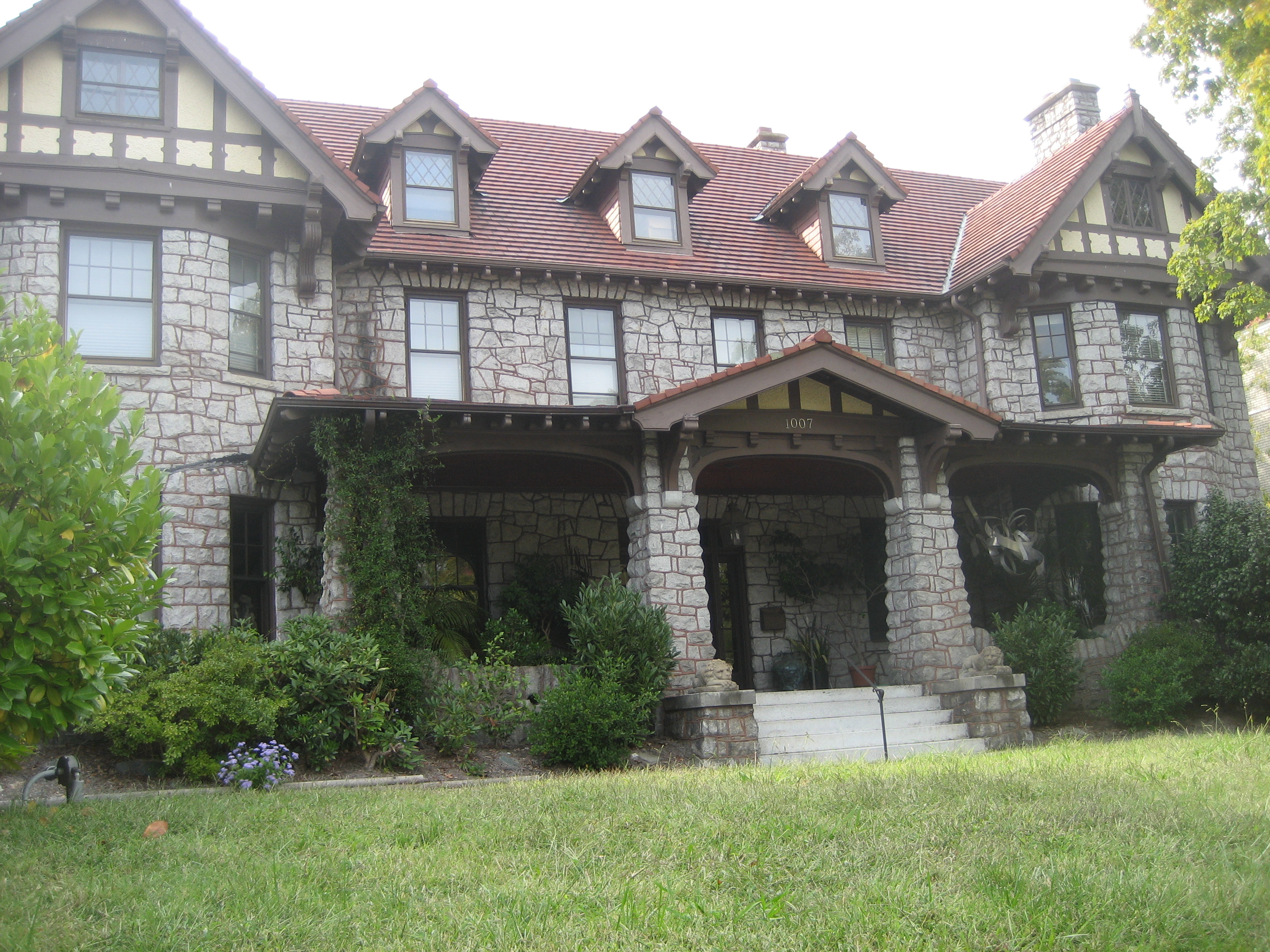
- Galloway House, September 2012

- Location within North Carolina Location within the United States
- Location: 1007 N. Elm St., Greensboro, North Carolina
- Coordinates: 36°5′11″N 79°47′24″W
- Area: less than one acre
- Built: 1919
- Built by: Schlosser, Andrew Leopold
- Architect: Barton, Harry M.
- Architectural style: Bungalow/craftsman, Tudor Revival
- NRHP reference No.: 83001886
- Added to NRHP: July 21, 1983

John Marion Galloway House is a historic home located at Greensboro, Guilford County, North Carolina. It was designed by noted architect Harry Barton and built in 1919. It is a three-story, rectangular dwelling with Tudor Revival and Bungalow / American Craftsman style design elements. It has a veneer of random-coursed granite with half-timbered gable ends, gable-roofed dormers, and a red tile roof. Also on the property is a contributing two-story double garage which once included servants' quarters.

It was listed on the National Register of Historic Places in 1983. It is located in the Fisher Park Historic District. The house was built for John Marion Galloway (1880-1922) who was reportedly the largest grower of bright leaf tobacco in the world.
