= Fisher Park Historic District =

Historic district in North Carolina, United States

- U.S. National Register of Historic Places
- U.S. Historic district
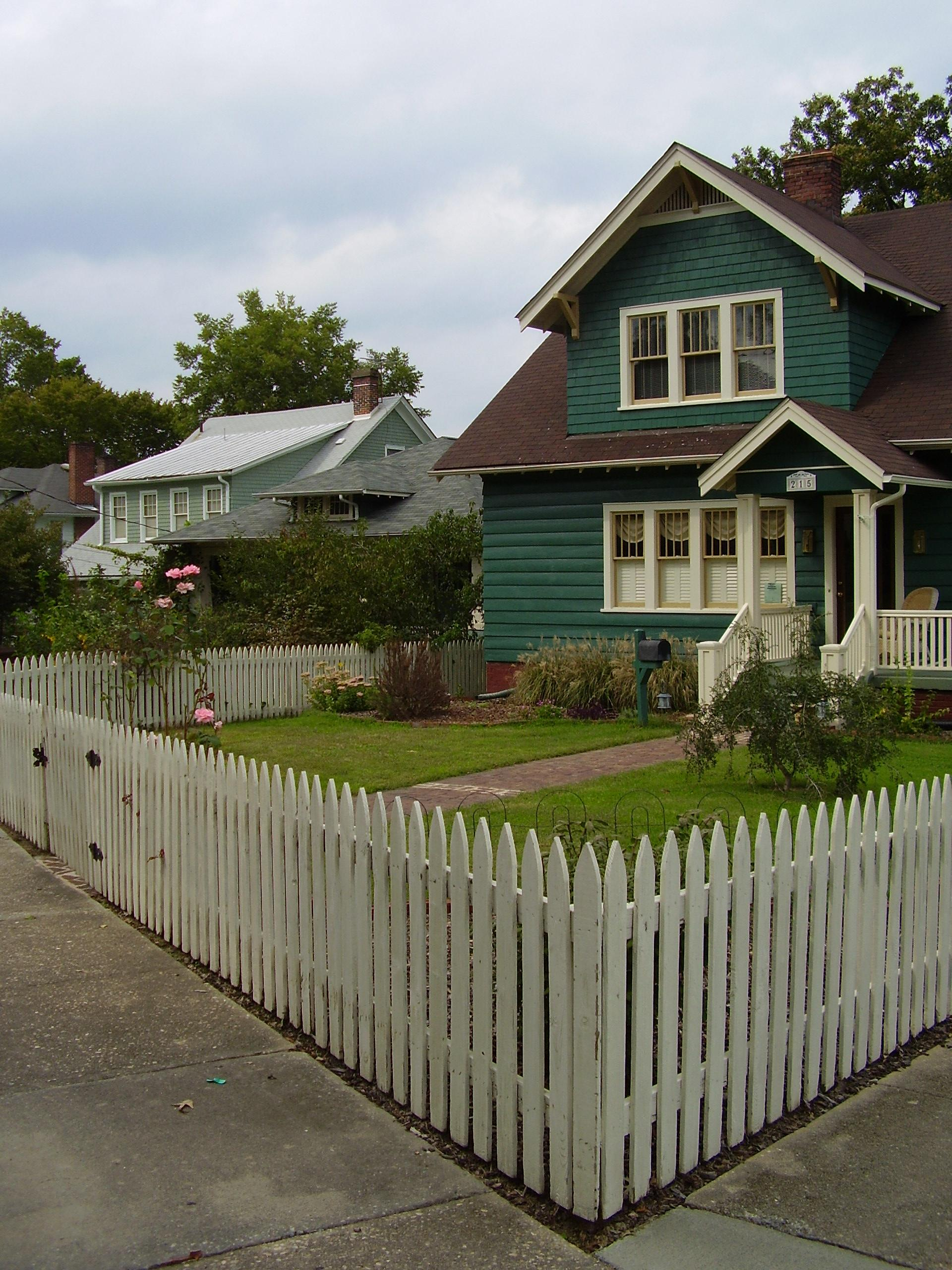
- Fisher Park Neighborhood, August 2006

- Location within North Carolina Location within the United States
- Location: Roughly bounded by Fisher and Bessemer Aves. and Wharton and Church Sts.; 507 N. Church St., Greensboro, North Carolina
- Coordinates: 36°04′59″N 79°47′26″W
- Area: 142 acres (57 ha)
- Built: 1905
- Architect: Multiple
- Architectural style: Bungalow/craftsman, Gothic, Foursquare, Queen Anne, Colonial Revival
- MPS: Greensboro MPS
- NRHP reference No.: 91002006 (original); 96000963 (increase)

Significant dates
- Added to NRHP: January 22, 1992
- Boundary increase: September 12, 1996

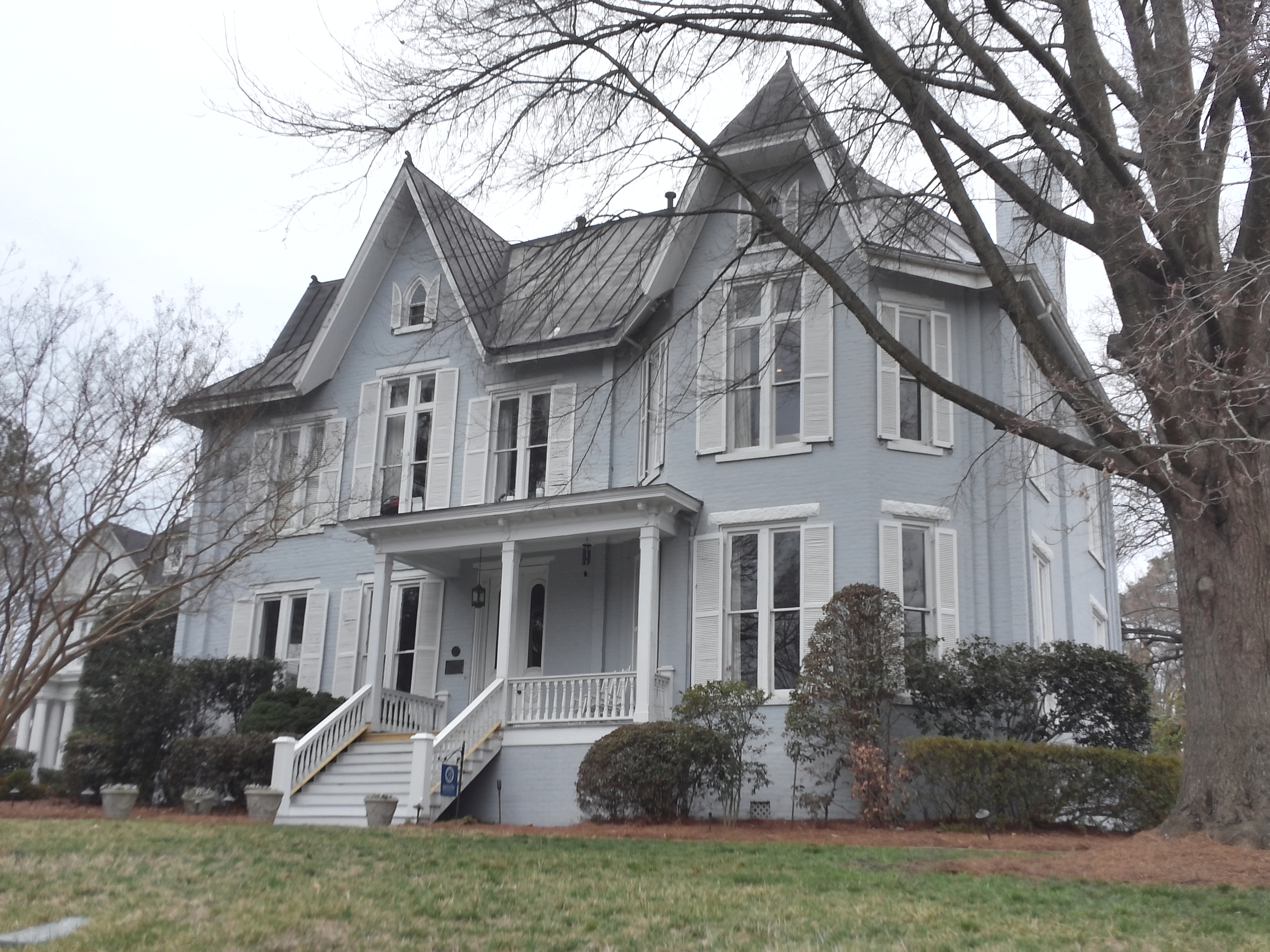
Dixon-Leftwich-Murphy House, 2015

Fisher Park Historic District is a national historic district in the Fisher Park neighborhood, Greensboro, Guilford County, North Carolina. The district encompasses 541 contributing buildings, 2 contributing sites, and 44 contributing structures in a predominantly residential section of Greensboro. The houses were largely built between the 1900s and 1930s and include notable examples of Queen Anne, Colonial Revival, Gothic Revival, American Foursquare, and Bungalow / American Craftsman-style architecture. Located in the district are the separately listed Dixon-Leftwich-Murphy House, John Marion Galloway House, Julian Price House, and Latham-Baker House. Other notable buildings include the First Presbyterian Church (1928), Holy Trinity Episcopal Church (1922), Gant-McAlister House (c. 1910–15), and A.J. Schlosser House (c. 1922).

It was listed on the National Register of Historic Places in 1992, with a boundary increase in 1996.
