= Julian Price =

American insurance executive (1867–1946)

- Born: November 25, 1867; Richmond, Virginia, U.S.
- Died: October 25, 1946 (aged 78); North Wilkesboro, North Carolina, U.S.
- Resting place: Green Hill Cemetery
- Occupation: Insurance executive
- Spouse: Ethel Clay Price
- Children: 2 (including Kathleen)
- Relatives: Nancy Bryan Faircloth (granddaughter)

Julian Price (November 25, 1867 – October 25, 1946) was an insurance executive who made his fortune in the first part of the twentieth century by developing the Jefferson Standard Life Insurance Company.

== Adult life and career ==
Price was an insurance salesman for the Greensboro Life Insurance Company of North Carolina.

In 1919, Price bought the Greensboro Daily Record newspaper.

In 1929, Price hired the New York architect Charles C. Hartmann to build Hillside in the Fisher Park neighborhood. The Fisher Park mansion would become Price's private residence.

Price's wife, Ethal, was a practicing Catholic, and when she died he paid for the construction of Our Lady of Grace Catholic Church in her honor.

== Legacy ==
The Julian Price Memorial Park is near the Moses H. Cone Memorial Park on the Blue Ridge Parkway.

== Bibliography ==
- "PRICE, Julian," The National Cyclopaedia of American Biography, Volume XXXIV (New York: James T. White & Company, 1948) pages 430–431
- The Jefferson Standard Story, Jeffersonian, August 1982, pp. 14–17.
- International Directory of Company Histories, Vol. 29. St. James Press, 1999.
- Weidner, David, Unchartered Waters, Greensboro News & Record, March 9, 1997, p. E1.
- Still, John T., Jefferson-Pilot and Parsons Group Settle Litigation, PR Newswire, April 5, 1993.
- Marshall, Kyle, JP Reaches Outside for Next CEO, News & Observer, August 12, 1992, Bus. Sec.
- Greensboro's Home to Major Insurance Companies, Greensboro News & Record, September 16, 1990, p. 40.
- Catanoso, Justin, Insurer Continues Toward Lofty Goal, Greensboro News & Record, February 25, 1997, p. A1.
- Coleman, Kathleen, The Pilot at JP Communications, Business Journal-Charlotte, November 13, 1989, Sec. 1, p. 8.
- Fox, James F., 75 Years: 1907 to 1982; Jefferson Standard Life Insurance Company, Greensboro, N.C.: Jefferson-Pilot Corp.
- Dictionary of North Carolina Biography. Volume 5, P-S. Edited by William S. Powell. Chapel Hill, NC: University of North Carolina Press, 1994.
- Biography Index. A cumulative index to biographical material in books and magazines. Volume 1: January, 1946-July, 1949. New York: H.W. Wilson Co., 1949.
- Biography Index. A cumulative index to biographical material in books and magazines. Volume 2: August, 1949-August, 1952. New York: H.W. Wilson Co., 1953.
