= Kathleen Price Bryan =

American philanthropist and clubwoman

- Born: Kathleen Marshall Clay Price; April 23, 1900; Greensboro, North Carolina, U.S.
- Died: August 6, 1984 (aged 84); Greensboro, North Carolina, U.S.
- Resting place: Green Hill Cemetery
- Occupations: socialite, philanthropist, clubwoman
- Spouse: Joseph M. Bryan (1927–1984; her death)
- Children: 3 (including Nancy Bryan Faircloth)
- Parent(s): Julian Price; Ethel Clay

Kathleen Marshall Clay Price Bryan (April 23, 1900 – August 6, 1984) was an American heiress and philanthropist. She founded the Junior League of Greensboro, North Carolina in 1926. Along with her husband, Joseph M. Bryan, she was an active philanthropist in North Carolina. Bryan was a patron of United Way, Our Lady of Grace Catholic Church, the Diplomatic Reception Rooms of the Department of State, and Duke University. Following her death, the Kathleen Price Bryan Family Fund was established to provide grants to various North Carolina organizations.

== Early life and family ==
Bryan was born Kathleen Marshall Clay Price on April 23, 1900, in Greensboro, North Carolina to Julian Price, an insurance executive who developed the Jefferson Standard Life Insurance Company, and Ethel Clay Price, a socialite and retired nurse. Her father was Baptist and her mother was Catholic. Bryan was the granddaughter of Colonel Henry de Boisfeuillet Clay, a U.S. Infantry officer and Civil War veteran.

== Philanthropy ==
On May 26, 1926, Bryan, along with nine of her friends from book club, selected a group of twenty-four additional young women to form the Greensboro Charity League. Their first meeting was at the Blue Room in the O. Henry Hotel. The Charity League later joined the Association of Junior Leagues and hosted a national representative of the League in 1927. It was officially incorporated by the national organization as the Junior League of Greensboro on March 5, 1928.

In the 1950s, she and her brother donated $300,000 to help fund the construction of Our Lady of Grace Catholic Church, originally started by her father as a memorial to her mother. The parish later named the Kathleen Price Bryan Banquet Hall in her honor.

In 1968, Bryan and her husband began making an annual contribution of $25,000 to United Way.

On May 12, 1970, Bryan and her husband were honored with a plaque, signed by U.S. Secretary of State William P. Rogers, for their financial contributions to the Diplomatic Reception Rooms of the U.S. Department of State.

Bryan and her husband were patrons of Duke University and were granted a certificate of appreciation from the university in 1980.

== Personal life ==
In New York, she met Joseph M. Bryan, an insurance businessman and the youngest member of the New York Cotton Exchange. They married on November 19, 1927, in Greensboro and lived together in New York City. They had three children: Kathleen, Nancy, and Joseph Jr.

In 1931, the Bryans moved to Greensboro, where her husband took a job with her father's insurance company, Jefferson Standard Life Insurance, eventually serving as director of the Jefferson-Pilot Corporation. They lived at Albright House, a 19th-century mansion. They later moved into a mansion in the Irving Park Historic District.

== Death and legacy ==
Bryan had Alzheimer's disease and died in 1984. After her death, her husband donated over $10 million to Duke University School of Medicine for Alzheimer's disease research.

In honor of Bryan, her family founded the Kathleen Price Bryan Family Fund, a charitable foundation that provided millions of dollars in donations and grants to causes in Greensboro and throughout North Carolina. The foundation provided funding for Oak Ridge Military Academy, the United Arts Council of Greensboro, the Center for Community Self-Help, Urban Ministries, Hospice at Greensboro, and The Salvation Army. The foundation was dissolved in 2000, distributing $70 million in assets among The Anonymous Fund, The Stewards Fund, and the Julian Price Family Fund, all run by Bryan's children.

In 2008, Bryan's home became the headquarters for the Junior League of Greensboro.

The Greensboro City Council named Bryan Park after her and her husband.

The Joseph M. and Kathleen Price Bryan University Center at Duke University is named after Bryan and her husband. A scholarship fund named after them, the Kathleen Price and Joseph M. Bryan Family Foundation Scholarship, was created for students at the University of North Carolina at Pembroke. Other buildings named for the couple were built at the University of North Carolina at Chapel Hill, the North Carolina School of Science and Mathematics, and North Carolina A&T University.

The Kathleen P. and Joseph M. Bryan Fellowship is offered through the Kathleen Price and Joseph M. Bryan Endowment Fund for business students at the University of North Carolina at Greensboro.

The Kathleen Price and Joseph M. Bryan Youth Concerto Competition was formed as an instrumentalist performance competition for musical students in North Carolina.
