= First Presbyterian Church of Greensboro =

Presbyterian church in Greensboro, North Carolina

First Presbyterian Church
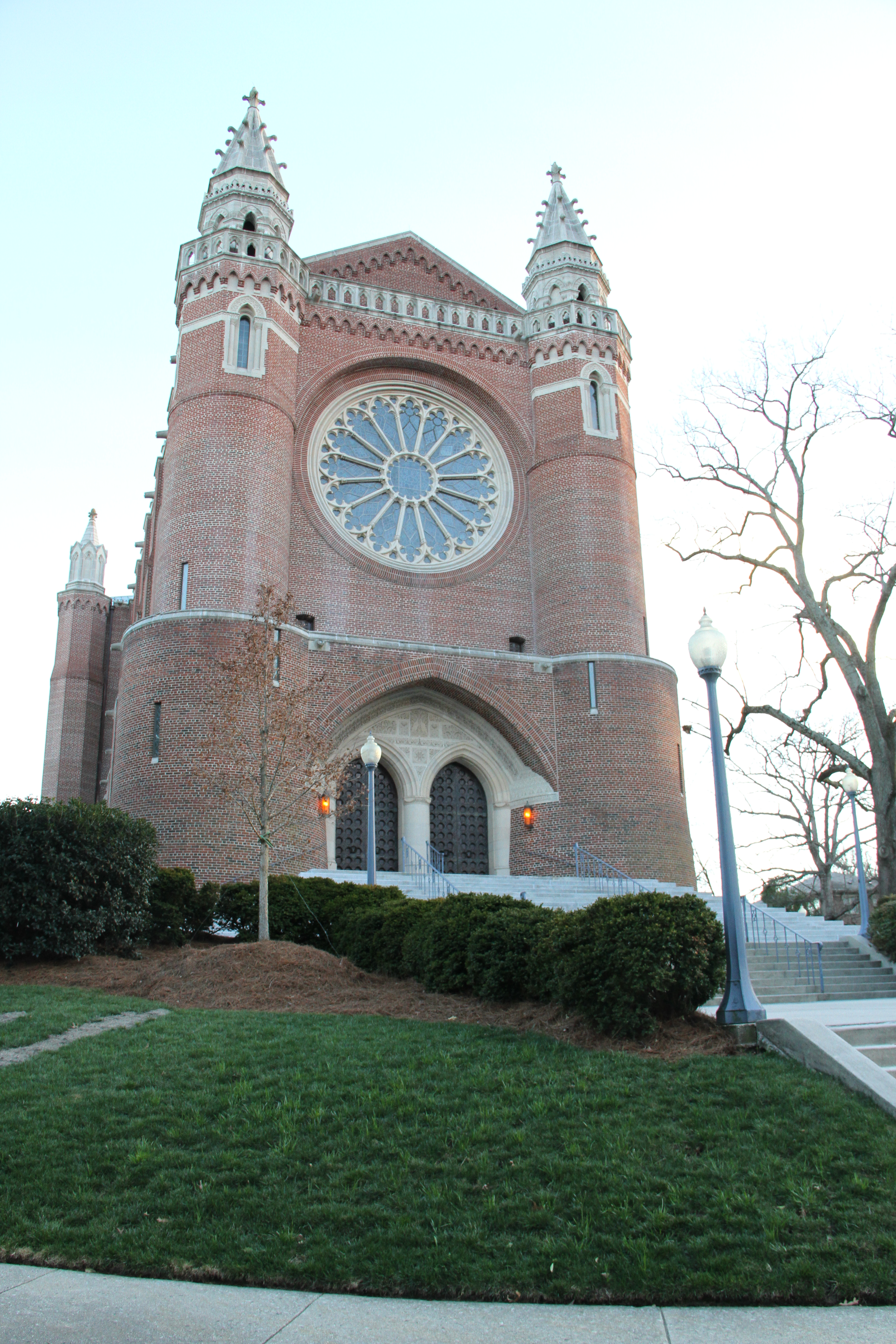

Religion
- Affiliation: Presbyterian Church USA
- District: Salem Presbytery

Location
- Location: 617 N Elm St, Greensboro, North Carolina, United States 27401
- State: North Carolina
- Interactive map of First Presbyterian Church
- Territory: Synod of Mid-Atlantic
- Coordinates: 36.0812°N 79.7905°W

Architecture
- Style: Gothic Revival
- Groundbreaking: 1927

First Presbyterian Church is a historic Presbyterian church located in the Fisher Park Historic District of Greensboro, North Carolina.

== History ==
First Presbyterian Church was founded in 1824 and was the first chartered Presbyterian church in the city. Four of its 12 original members were slaves. Thirty to 40 slaves were members by the time of the American Civil War, and after being freed, 37 former slaves started Saint James Presbyterian at Friendly Avenue and Church Street. Saint James is now located on Ross Avenue. First Presbyterian Church has occupied four buildings in its history. The first three were located at Church Street and Summit Avenue north of the city center. The third building on that site, a Romanesque Revival style brick structure, now houses the Greensboro Historical Museum. In 1929 First Presbyterian Church moved into its fourth and current building, a Gothic Revival cathedral overlooking Fisher Park.

== Recent pastors ==
- Dr. John A. Redhead began a 25-year pastorate in 1945. Dr. Redhead also spoke on the Protestant Radio Hour and Armed Forces Radio.
- Dr. Joseph B. Mullin served from 1971 to 1988. The church's Mullin Life Center is named in honor of Dr. Mullin.
- Dr. Jerold D. Shetler served from 1988 to 1998.
- On January 1, 2001, Dr. Sid Batts became the church's eleventh pastor.
- In 2018, Dr. Daniel W. Massie became interim pastor.
- In December 2020, Rev. Dr. Jill Duffield became the church's twelfth pastor, and the first woman to hold the position.

== Notable parishioners ==
- Janet Kay Ruthven Hagan, U.S. Senator from 2009 to 2015
- Thomas W. Ross, president of the University of North Carolina system from 2011 to 2016
- Mary Bonneau McElveen-Hunter, businesswoman and socialite, former U.S. Ambassador to Finland

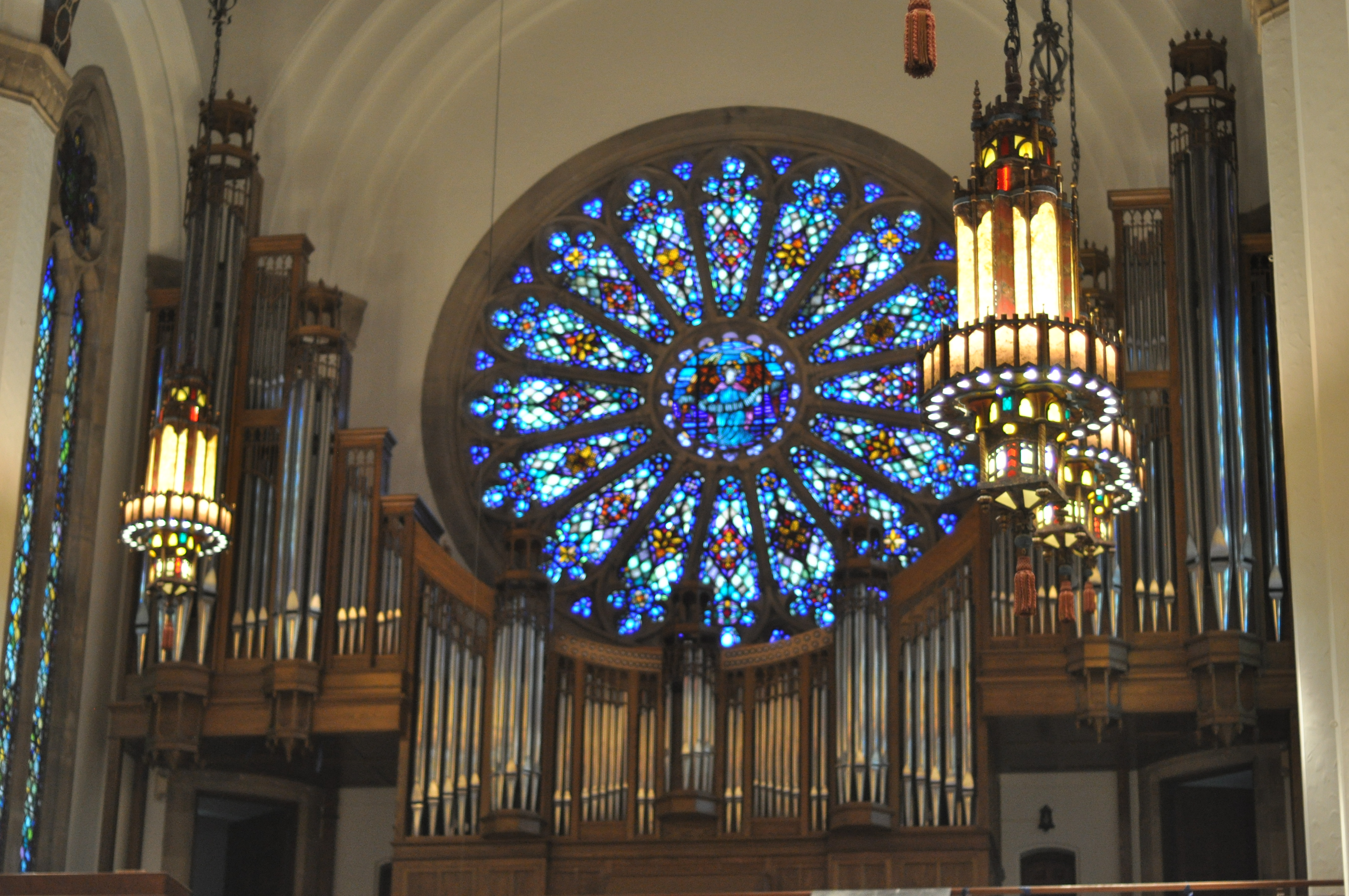
Interior view of north-facing rose window inside First Presbyterian Church, Greensboro, NC

- Ann Eliza Lindsay Morehead, First Lady of North Carolina
- John Motley Morehead, 29th Governor of North Carolina
- William Cunningham Smith, Former Dean of the College of Liberal Arts at the University of North Carolina at Greensboro
- Robert Paine Dick, United States District Court Justice
- William Crosby Dawson, U.S. Congressman
- John Adams Gilmer, U.S. Congressman
- Pat McCrory, 74th Governor of North Carolina
- L. Richardson Preyer, U.S. Congressman
