= Joseph M. Bryan =

American businessman (1896–1995)

- Born: February 11, 1896; Elyria, Ohio, US
- Died: April 26, 1995 (aged 99); Greensboro, North Carolina, US
- Resting place: Green Hill Cemetery
- Occupation: Insurance executive
- Spouse: Kathleen Price Bryan (m. 1927–1984)
- Children: 3, including Nancy

Joseph McKinley Bryan (February 11, 1896 – April 26, 1995) was an American insurance executive, broadcast pioneer, and philanthropist.

== Early life ==
Born in Elyria, Ohio, Bryan was the second son of Bart Bryan and Caroline Ebert Bryan. After serving overseas in World War I, he returned to New York City to take a job with a cotton firm. In 1923 he became the youngest member of the New York Cotton Exchange. Bryan married Kathleen M. Price of Greensboro, North Carolina, on November 19. 1927. His wife was the daughter of Julian Price and Ethel Clay Price. In 1931, the couple moved to Greensboro, where Bryan accepted a job offer from Julian Price, who was the founder of the Jefferson Standard Life Insurance Company. They had three children, including Nancy Bryan Faircloth.

== Career ==
Bryan joined the staff of the Jefferson Standard Life Insurance Company and moved up through the ranks. In 1934, he became the president of a subsidiary company which purchased WBIG, then Greensboro's only radio station, and saved it from being taken off the air. The company expanded its broadcasting division in 1945 with it purchased WBT in Charlotte. Four years later, WBTV became the first television station to air in North and South Carolina.

Bryan went on to serve in various capacities with several large corporations. In addition to being senior vice president of Jefferson Standard Life Insurance Company and chairman of the board of Pilot Life Insurance Company, he served as a member of the board of the parent corporation, Jefferson-Pilot, until 1993 when he was made honorary and lifetime member of the board. Bryan also served on the boards of NCNB, Atlantic and Yadkin Railroad, and several personal companies. He was one of the original six members of the North Carolina Business Hall of Fame.

Kathleen died in 1984 after a long battle with Alzheimer's disease. Frustrated by the lack of knowledge on the disease in the medical community, Bryan backed an experimental procedure at Duke University involving rapid autopsies of victims of Alzheimer's. The initial success of the program prompted him to donate ten million dollars for Alzheimer's research, putting Duke University Medical Center at the forefront of the battle against the disease.

Bryan was also involved in civic organizations such as the Rotary Club, Masons, Shriners, and other community groups. He served on several governmental committees, including the Governor's Committee on Low Income Housing and the U.S. State Department's Fine Arts Committee. In 1961, Governor Luther Hodges named Bryan Chairman of the North Carolina State Board of Elections. In 1986, Bryan received the North Carolina Award in Public Service.

The Bryans' long standing record of philanthropy has received national recognition. In 1955, the Bryan Family Foundation was established as a vehicle for their benevolence. Education was always a priority. The University of North Carolina at Greensboro, North Carolina School of Science and Math, Duke University, Greensboro College, North Carolina A&T State University, Guilford College, Bennett College, Belmont Abbey, Converse College, Elon University and many more institutions have benefited from the generosity of Mr. and Mrs. Bryan. UNCG's School of Business and Economics was named in honor of Joseph M. Bryan.

Bryan was a sports enthusiast known for his love of golf. He was an early member of the Augusta National Golf Club. The Greensboro Jaycees approached him in 1937 to assist in guaranteeing the purse of the first Greater Greensboro Open PGA Tour tournament, which took place in 1938. He later became Honorary General Chairman for the golf tournament, now known as the Wyndham Championship. In 1971, the City of Greensboro named Bryan Park, a new municipal golf complex, in honor of Mr. and Mrs. Bryan. Fishing and shooting were also among Bryan's favorite pastimes. He particularly liked to salmon fish in Canada and was an award-winning marlin fisherman. Whether in the United States or in Europe, he could be found among the world's elite shooters.

In the last year of his life, including the day he was admitted to the hospital, Bryan made daily visits to his office in the Jefferson Standard Building. He died in Greensboro on April 26, 1995, aged 99.

Bryan Boulevard, a freeway-grade arterial road in Greensboro, is named for him.
