= Washington Street Historic District (High Point, North Carolina) =

Historic district in North Carolina, United States

- U.S. National Register of Historic Places
- U.S. Historic district
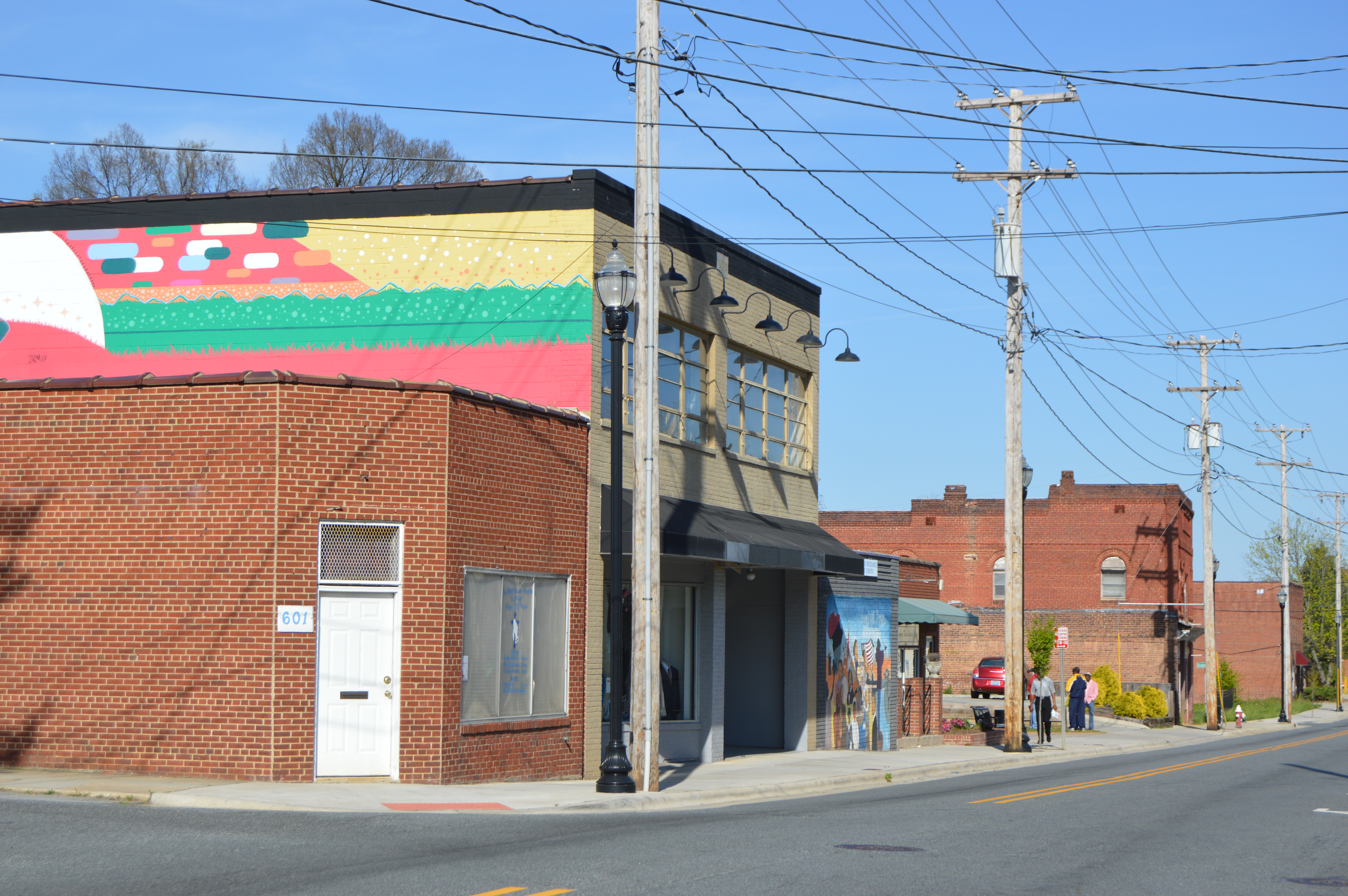
- Northwestern section of the district

- Location within North Carolina Location within the United States
- Location: Portions of eight blocks on Washington, Centennial, Fourth, and Hobson Sts., Eccles Pl., and Gaylord Ct., High Point, North Carolina
- Coordinates: 35°57′40″N 80°00′08″W
- Area: 29 acres (12 ha)
- Built: 1906
- Architect: Robert W. Conner; Leon Schute; Voorhees and Everhart
- Architectural style: Commercial Style, Modern Movement, Art Moderne, Classical Revival, Colonial Revival, Gothic Revival, Queen Anne, Bungalow/Craftsman
- NRHP reference No.: 10001094
- Added to NRHP: December 28, 2010

Washington Street Historic District is a national historic district located at High Point, Guilford County, North Carolina. The district encompasses 36 contributing buildings and 1 contributing structure in a predominantly African-American section of High Point. They date from the early- to mid-20th century and include a mix of commercial and residential buildings in a variety of popular architectural styles including Art Moderne, Classical Revival architecture, Colonial Revival architecture, Gothic Revival architecture, and Bungalow / American Craftsman architecture. Located in the district and listed separately are the Kilby Hotel, First Baptist Church, and William Penn High School. Other notable buildings include the Odd Fellows Hall, Morgan Apartments, Hoover's Funeral Home, the Toussaint L’Ouverture Lodge No. 524, Yarborough Law Building and the Washington Street Branch of the High Point Public Library.

It was listed on the National Register of Historic Places in 2010.
