= Addison McDowell =

American politician (born 1994)

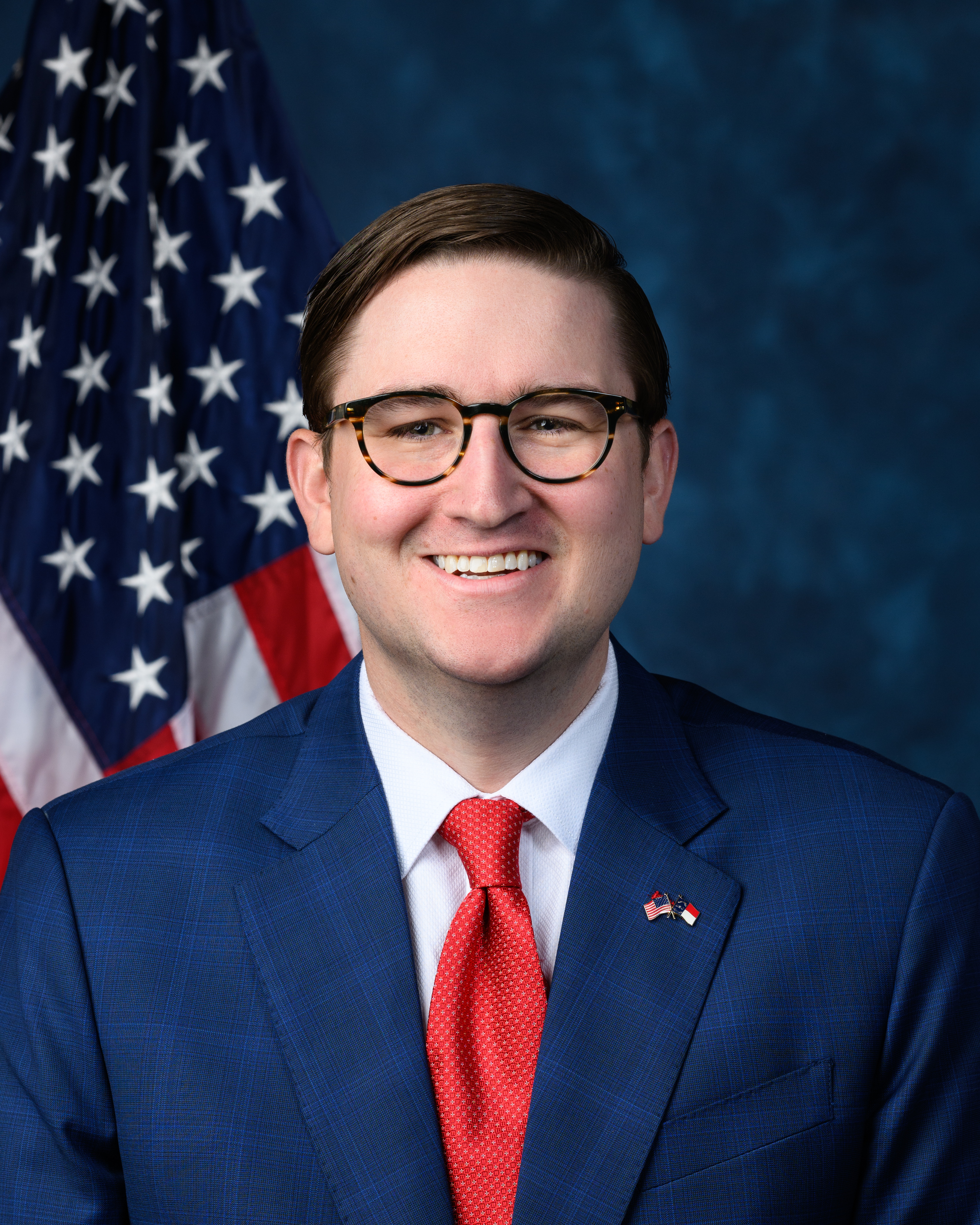
- Official portrait, 2024

Member of the U.S. House of Representatives from North Carolina's 6th district
- Incumbent
- Assumed office January 3, 2025
- Preceded by: Kathy Manning
- Succeeded by: Cyril Jefferson (elect)

Personal details
- Born: Addison Parker McDowell; January 21, 1994 (age 32) Whiteville, North Carolina, U.S.
- Party: Republican
- Spouse: Rachel McDowell
- Children: 2
- Education: University of North Carolina at Charlotte (BA)
- Website: House website Campaign website

Addison Parker McDowell (born January 21, 1994) is an American politician and lobbyist serving as the U.S. representative for North Carolina's 6th congressional district since 2025. A member of the Republican Party, McDowell was first elected in 2024 and was defeated for reelection in 2026 by Democrat Cyril Jefferson.

== Early life and career ==
McDowell was born in January 1994. He was raised in Lexington, North Carolina, and graduated from the University of North Carolina at Charlotte in 2016. He worked for a United States House of Representatives election campaign for Richard Hudson and in constituent services for Representative Ted Budd. He then served as a lobbyist for Blue Cross Blue Shield of North Carolina.

== U.S. House of Representatives ==
=== Elections ===
==== 2024 ====
McDowell decided to run for the United States House of Representatives in North Carolina's 6th congressional district in the 2024 elections. He attributed his decision to run to his younger brother Luke's death from an accidental fentanyl overdose.

McDowell finished in first place in the Republican primary election with 26% of the vote, though he fell short of the 30% of the vote required to avoid a runoff election. Mark Walker finished in second place, with 24%. Though Walker initially indicated that he wanted a runoff election, he opted to join the Donald Trump 2024 presidential campaign rather than seek a runoff, making McDowell the Republican nominee. He won the November election.

==== 2026 ====
McDowell ran for reelection in 2026 and was defeated by Democratic nominee Cyril Jefferson, the mayor of High Point, flipping the seat. Jefferson won by about 2.3 percentage points.

In 2024, McDowell had won the district by about 39 percentage points, and Donald Trump carried it by 17 points in the presidential race. Democrats had not fielded a candidate in the district in 2024, and the 2026 race had been rated safely Republican by forecasters. Jefferson spent approximately $224,000 in the race, compared with approximately $1.3 million by McDowell. McDowell was one of several North Carolina Republican incumbents defeated in the 2026 election.

=== Committee assignments ===
For the 119th Congress:

- Committee on the Budget
- Committee on Natural Resources
  - Subcommittee on Indian and Insular Affairs
  - Subcommittee on Water, Wildlife and Fisheries
- Committee on Transportation and Infrastructure
  - Subcommittee on Aviation
  - Subcommittee on Coast Guard and Maritime Transportation
  - Subcommittee on Highways and Transit

== Personal life ==
McDowell's younger brother, Luke, died from an overdose of fentanyl in 2016. He has two children.

== Electoral history ==
2024 North Carolina's 6th congressional district Republican primary results
Party	Candidate	Votes	%
Republican	Addison McDowell	21,285	26.1
Republican	Mark Walker	19,633	24.1
Republican	Christian Castelli	17,171	21.1
Republican	Bo Hines	11,746	14.4
Republican	Jay Wagner	7,462	9.2
Republican	Mary Ann Contogiannis	4,195	5.1
Total votes		81,492	100.0

2024 North Carolina's 6th congressional district election
Party	Candidate	Votes	%
Republican	Addison McDowell	233,303	69.2
Constitution	Kevin Hayes	104,017	30.8
Total votes		337,320	100.0
Republican gain from Democratic			

2026 North Carolina's 6th congressional district election
Party	Candidate	Votes	%
Democratic	Cyril Jefferson	140,707	51.2
Republican	Addison McDowell (incumbent)	134,103	48.8
Total votes		274,810	100.0
Democratic gain from Republican			

U.S. House of Representatives
Preceded by Kathy Manning	Member of the U.S. House of Representatives from North Carolina's 6th congressional district 2025–present	Incumbent
U.S. order of precedence (ceremonial)
Preceded by Kristen McDonald Rivet	United States representatives by seniority 402nd	Succeeded by John McGuire
