= West High Street Historic District =

West High Street Historic District may refer to:

- West High Street Historic District (Lexington, Kentucky), formerly listed on the NRHP in Kentucky
- West High Street Historic District (High Point, North Carolina), listed on the NRHP in North Carolina
