= List of mayors of High Point, North Carolina =

Mayors of the city of High Point, North Carolina, USA

Mayor of High Point, North Carolina

- Incumbent; Cyril Jefferson since December 4, 2023
- Inaugural holder: Nathan Hunt Jr.
- Formation: 1860

The following is a list of mayors of the city of High Point, North Carolina, USA.

- Nathan Hunt Jr., 1860
- William Gaston Bradshaw, 1897–1898
- Joseph John Cox, 1899–1905
- Manliff Jarrell Wrenn, 1905-1909
- Fred N. Tate, 1909–1915
- William Penn Pickett, 1915-1917
- William Preston Ragan, 1917–1918
- David A. Stanton, 1918-1921
- John W. Hedrick, 1921–1925
- Hugh Alfred Moffitt Sr., 1925–1927
- W. A. Davis, 1927–1929
- C. A. York, 1929-1931
- Charles Shober Grayson, 1931-1939
- Oscar Arthur Kirkman, 1939–1943
- Arnold Jackson Koonce Sr., 1943-1945
- Earl Norfleet Phillips Sr., 1945–1949
- William Fleming Bailey Sr., 1949–1951
- Amos Ragan Kearns, 1951–1953
- George Armfield Covington, 1953-1957
- Jesse Heywood Washburn, 1958-1961
- Carson C. Stout, 1961–1963, 1965–1967
- Floyd D. Mehan, 1963–1965
- Robert Dorsey “Bob” Davis Sr., 1967–1971
- William Snow “Bill” Bencini Sr., 1971–1973
- Paul Wood Clapp, 1973-1975
- Roy B. Culler Jr., 1975–1981, 1987–1992
- Robert O. Wells, 1981-1985
- Judith Peterson “Judy” Mendenhall, 1985-1987
- Rebecca Rhodes “Becky” Smothers, 1992–1999, 2003-2012
- Arnold Jackson Koonce Jr., 1999-2003
- Bernita Sims, 2012-2014 - First African-American mayor of High Point
- James C. “Jim” Davis, 2014
- William S. “Bill” Bencini Jr., 2014-2016
- Jay W. Wagner, 2016-2023
- Cyril Jefferson, December 4, 2023–present - Youngest mayor in High Point's history

== See also ==
- High Point history
