= Cyril Jefferson =

American politician

- Official portrait, 2026

Member-elect of the U.S. House of Representatives from North Carolina's 6th district
- Assuming office January 3, 2027
- Succeeding: Addison McDowell

Mayor of High Point, North Carolina
- Incumbent
- Assumed office December 4, 2023
- Preceded by: Jay W. Wagner

Personal details
- Born: April 9, 1992 (age 34) Utica, New York, U.S.
- Party: Democratic
- Education: Howard University (attended); North Carolina A&T State University (BA)

Cyril Anthony Jefferson (born April 9, 1992) is an American politician who is a member-elect of the United States House of Representatives for North Carolina's 6th congressional district, having defeated incumbent U.S. Rep. Addison McDowell (R) in the 2026 United States House of Representatives election.

Jefferson has served as mayor of High Point, North Carolina, since December 2023. He is the youngest elected mayor in High Point's history, as well as the city's second African-American mayor.

== Early life ==
Jefferson is from Utica, New York. At age 14, he moved to High Point, North Carolina, where he attended T. Wingate Andrews High School. In high school, Jefferson was a member of the marching band. He received a full scholarship to Howard University in Washington, D.C.. Jefferson later transferred to North Carolina A&T State University and earned a Bachelor of Arts in liberal studies in 2018.

Jefferson has worked as a music teacher and established a consultancy firm known as "Change Often". He and his wife, Raven, whom he met in high school, have two children.

== Political career ==
In 2019, Jefferson won election to the High Point City Council representing Ward 1. Four years later, he was elected as mayor of High Point with 7,296 votes, defeating his opponent, Victor Jones. He became the second African-American to hold the position and the youngest mayor in city history. (Former Mayor Bernita Sims was the city's first African-American mayor).

In August 2025, Jefferson launched a campaign for the United States House of Representatives for North Carolina's 6th congressional district as a member of the Democratic Party. He won the Democratic primary with 39% of the vote against Alysa Kassay.

In the general election, Jefferson faced off against incumbent Republican Addison McDowell. The congressional district is considered strongly Republican-leaning and was rated by many websites as "solid" or "safe" Republican. McDowell remarked that Jefferson had a better chance of winning the lottery than defeating him. Nevertheless, Jefferson beat McDowell in the November 3 election with 51.1% of the vote in a major upset.Jefferson was one of at least six North Carolinian Democratic house candidates to win a district that voted for Donald Trump by 10 or more points in 2024, in what commentators deemed a dummymander of North Carolina's 2023 gerrymander.

U.S. House of Representatives
| Preceded by Addison McDowell | Member of the U.S. House of Representatives from North Carolina's 6th congressional district Taking office 2027 | Elect |
