= Oakwood Historic District =

Oakwood Historic District may refer to:

- Vine-Oakwood-Green Bay Road Historic District, Lake Forest, IL, listed on the NRHP in Illinois
- Oakwood Historic District (Hickory, North Carolina), listed on the NRHP in North Carolina
- Oakwood Historic District (High Point, North Carolina), listed on the NRHP in North Carolina
- Oakwood Historic District (Raleigh, North Carolina), listed on the NRHP in North Carolina
- Oakwood-Chimborazo Historic District, Richmond, VA, listed on the NRHP in Virginia
- Oakwood Historic District, East Lansing, MI
