= A. E. Taplin Apartment Building =

Historic building in North Carolina, US

- U.S. National Register of Historic Places
- U.S. Historic district – Contributing property
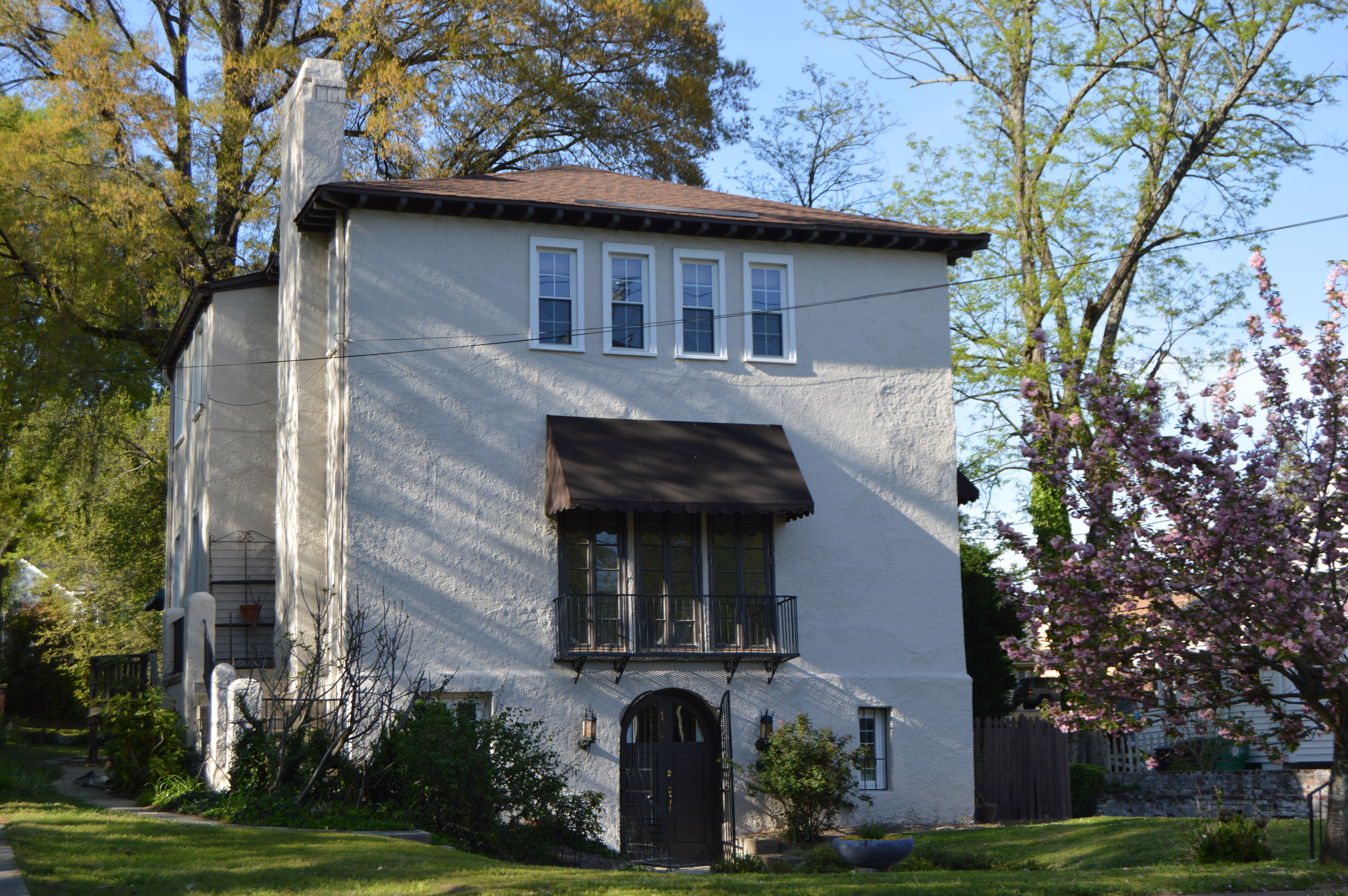
- Front

- Location within North Carolina Location within the United States
- Location: 408 W. Parkway Ave., High Point, North Carolina
- Coordinates: 35°58′3″N 80°1′11″W
- Area: 0.2 acres (0.081 ha)
- Built: 1920
- Architectural style: Mission/spanish Revival
- NRHP reference No.: 96000196
- Added to NRHP: March 1, 1996

A. E. Taplin Apartment Building is a historic apartment building located at High Point, Guilford County, North Carolina. It was built in 1920, and is a three-story, stuccoed frame Mission Revival style building housing five apartments. It has a low hipped roof, a pair of arched entry doors within a semi-circular arch, and a second-level balcony of black wrought iron.

It was listed on the National Register of Historic Places in 1996. It is located in the Uptown Suburbs Historic District.
