= Lucy and J. Vassie Wilson House =

Historic house in North Carolina, United States

- U.S. National Register of Historic Places
- U.S. Historic district – Contributing property
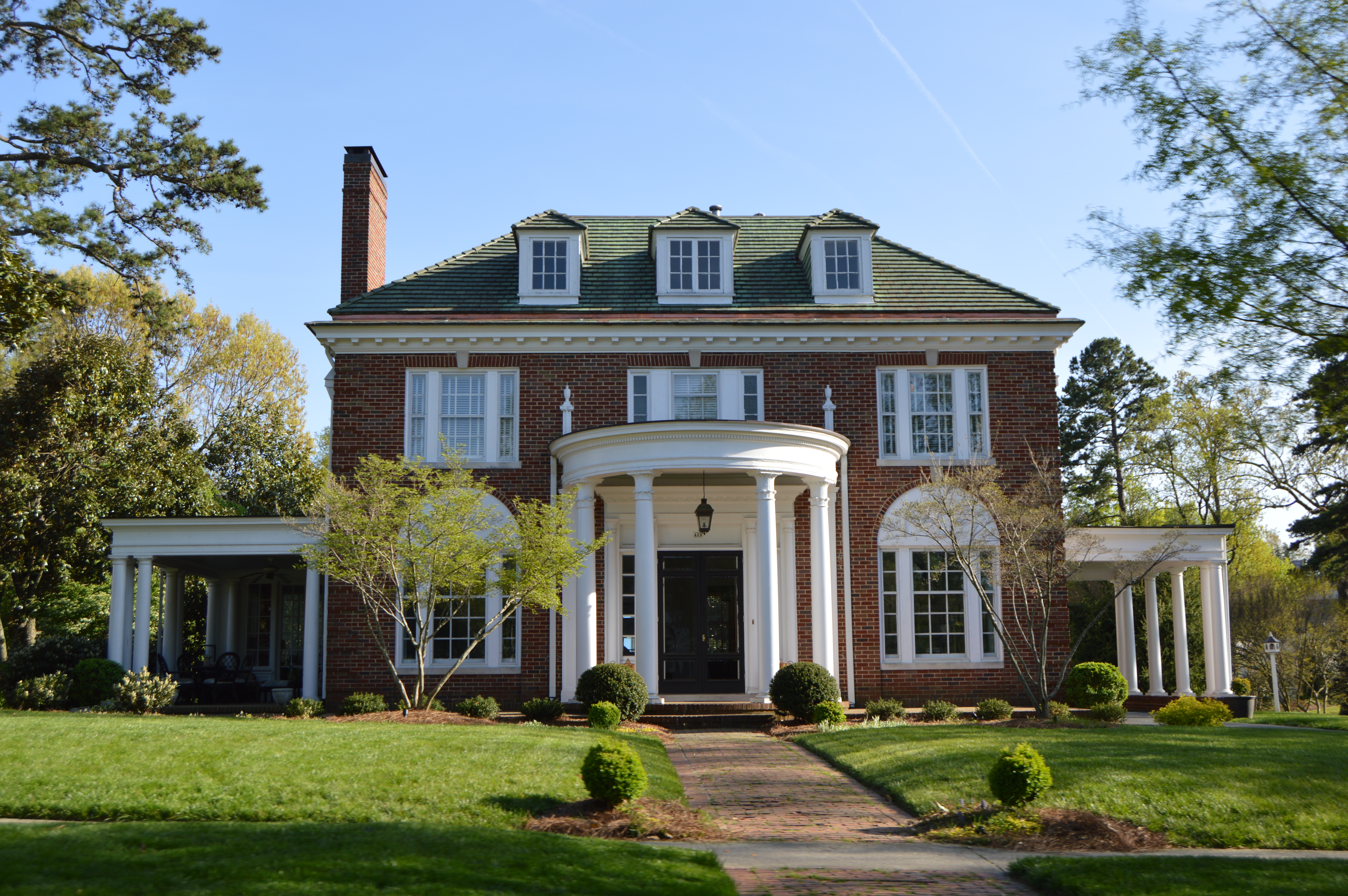
- Front

- Location within North Carolina Location within the United States
- Location: 425 Hillcrest Dr., High Point, North Carolina
- Coordinates: 35°58′26″N 80°1′39″W
- Area: less than one acre
- Built: 1926
- Architect: Fred B. Klein
- Architectural style: Colonial Revival
- NRHP reference No.: 05000378
- Added to NRHP: May 4, 2005

Lucy and J. Vassie Wilson House is a historic home located at High Point, Guilford County, North Carolina. It was built in 1926, and is a two-story, three-bay, Colonial Revival-style brick dwelling. It has a tile hipped roof, porte-cochère, and features a semicircular columned porch supported by four columns with stylized Corinthian order capitals. Also on the property is a contributing three-car brick garage.

It was listed on the National Register of Historic Places in 2005. It is located in the Uptown Suburbs Historic District.
