= Spring Hill Methodist Protestant Church Cemetery =

Historic church cemetery near High Point, Davidson County, North Carolina

- U.S. National Register of Historic Places
- Location within North Carolina Location within the United States
- Location: SR 1755, near High Point, North Carolina
- Coordinates: 35°58′15″N 80°3′20″W
- Area: 3 acres (1.2 ha)
- MPS: Anglo-German Cemeteries TR
- NRHP reference No.: 84002151
- Added to NRHP: July 10, 1984

Spring Hill Methodist Protestant Church Cemetery is a historic church cemetery located near High Point, Davidson County, North Carolina. It is associated with the Spring Hill Methodist Protestant Church, founded in 1830. It contains approximately 300 burials, with the earliest gravestone dated to 1839. It features a unique collection of folk gravestones by local stonecutters erected in Davidson County in the late-18th and first half of the 19th centuries.

It was listed on the National Register of Historic Places in 1984.
