= Hardee Apartments =

- U.S. National Register of Historic Places
- U.S. Historic district – Contributing property
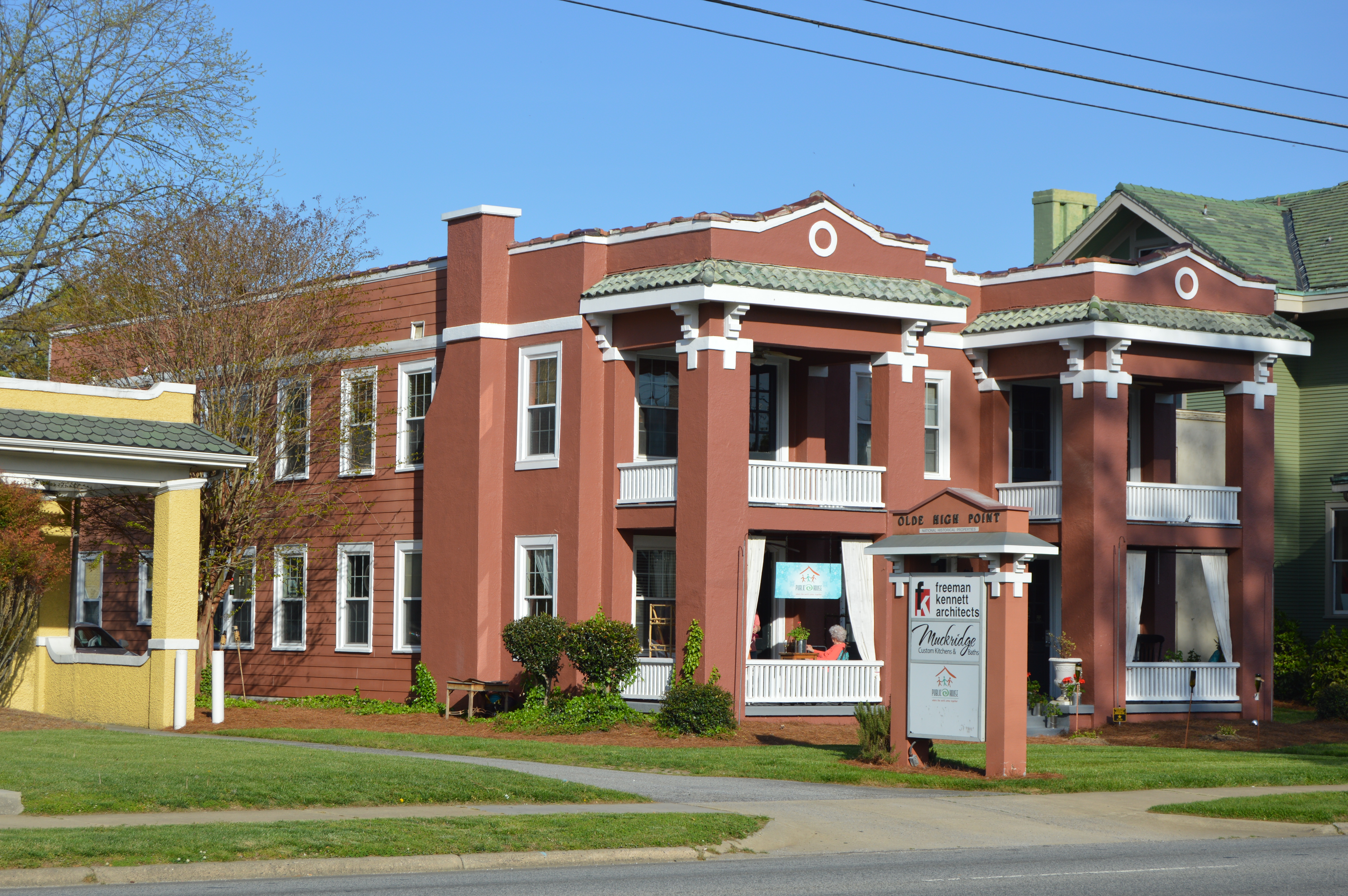
- Front and northern side

- Location within North Carolina Location within the United States
- Location: 1102 N. Main St., High Point, North Carolina
- Coordinates: 35°58′9″N 80°0′54″W
- Area: less than one acre
- Built: 1924
- Architectural style: Mission/spanish Revival
- NRHP reference No.: 91000260
- Added to NRHP: March 14, 1991

Hardee Apartments, also known as Jarrell Apartments, is a historic apartment building located at High Point, Guilford County, North Carolina. It was built in 1924, and is a two-story, four unit, Mission Revival style building. The frame building has a stuccoed finish. It features massive two-tiered corner porches and a pair of central stair entrances.

It was listed on the National Register of Historic Places in 1993. It is located in the Uptown Suburbs Historic District.
