= Eli Moore House =

Historic house in North Carolina, United States

- U.S. National Register of Historic Places
- Location within North Carolina Location within the United States
- Location: SR 1741, near High Point, North Carolina
- Coordinates: 35°58′52″N 80°03′41″W
- Area: 29.4 acres (11.9 ha)
- MPS: Davidson County MRA
- NRHP reference No.: 84002137
- Added to NRHP: July 10, 1984

Eli Moore House is a historic home located near High Point, Davidson County, North Carolina. It dates to the late-18th or early-19th century, and is a 1 1/2-story, hall-and-parlor plan, log dwelling with a rear wing. The house measures 26 feet by 18 feet and sits on a fieldstone pier foundation.

It was added to the National Register of Historic Places in 1984.
