= Dr. C. S. Grayson House =

Historic house in North Carolina, United States

- U.S. National Register of Historic Places
- U.S. Historic district – Contributing property
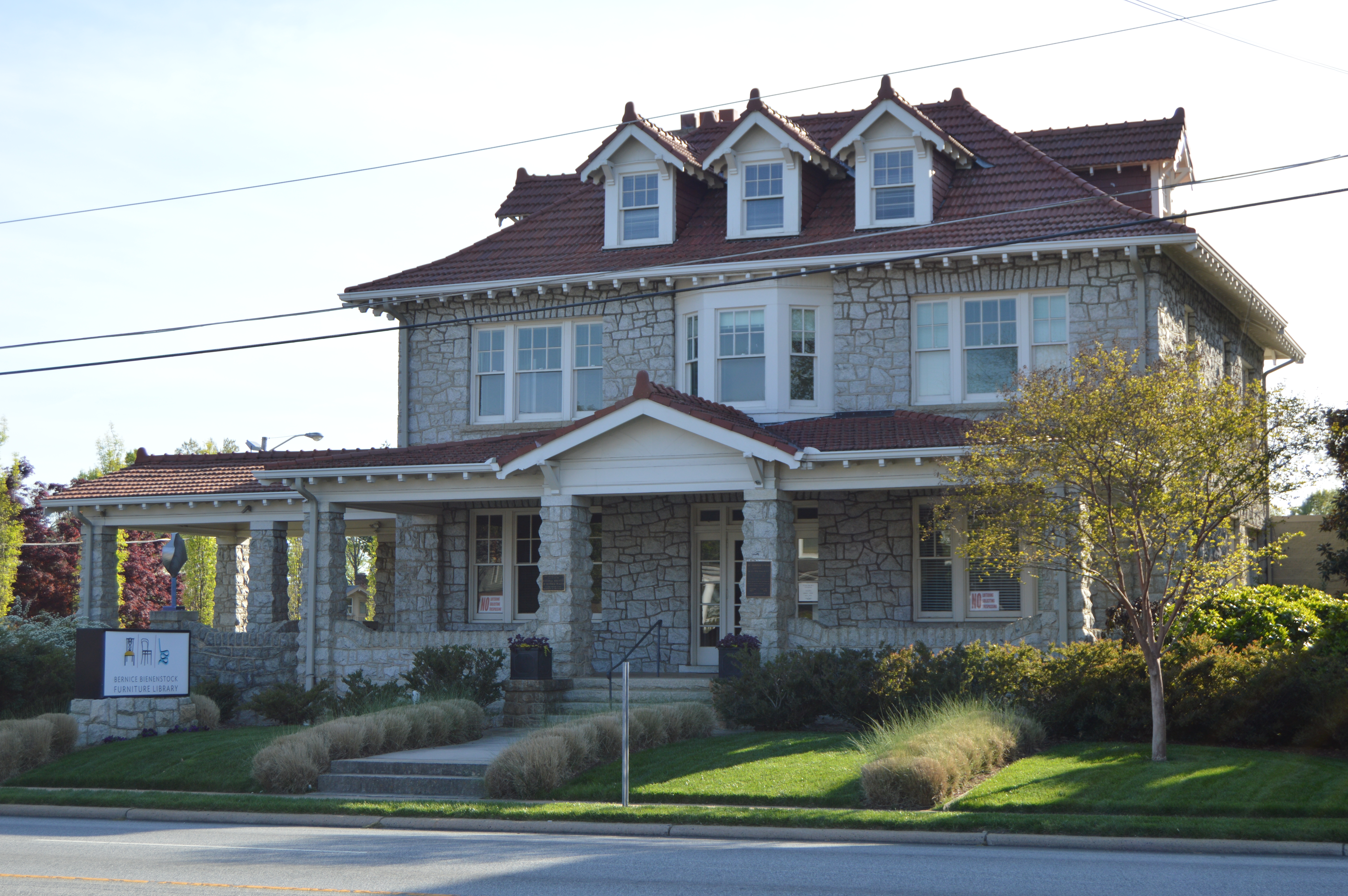
- Front

- Location within North Carolina Location within the United States
- Location: 1009 N. Main St., High Point, North Carolina
- Coordinates: 35°58′5″N 80°0′55″W
- Area: 0.5 acres (0.20 ha)
- Built: 1923-1925
- Architect: Harry Barton
- Architectural style: Colonial Revival
- NRHP reference No.: 94000190
- Added to NRHP: March 17, 1994

Dr. C. S. Grayson House is a historic home located at High Point, Guilford County, North Carolina. It was designed by architect Harry Barton and built between 1923 and 1925. It is a 2 1/2-story, three-bay, gray granite dwelling in an eclectic Colonial Revival style with American Craftsman influence. It has a slightly flared hipped roof, porte cochere, and one-story full-facade front porch. Also on the property is a contributing garage.

Since 1970, it has housed the Bernice Bienenstock Furniture Library, which is the world's largest specialty collection of books about the history and design of furniture, interiors, architecture, construction and more. As part of this library that is open to the public, the house hosts professional meetings, seminars, lectures and art events.

It was listed on the National Register of Historic Places in 1994. It is located in the Uptown Suburbs Historic District.
