= Allen Jay School Rock Gymnasium =

- U.S. National Register of Historic Places
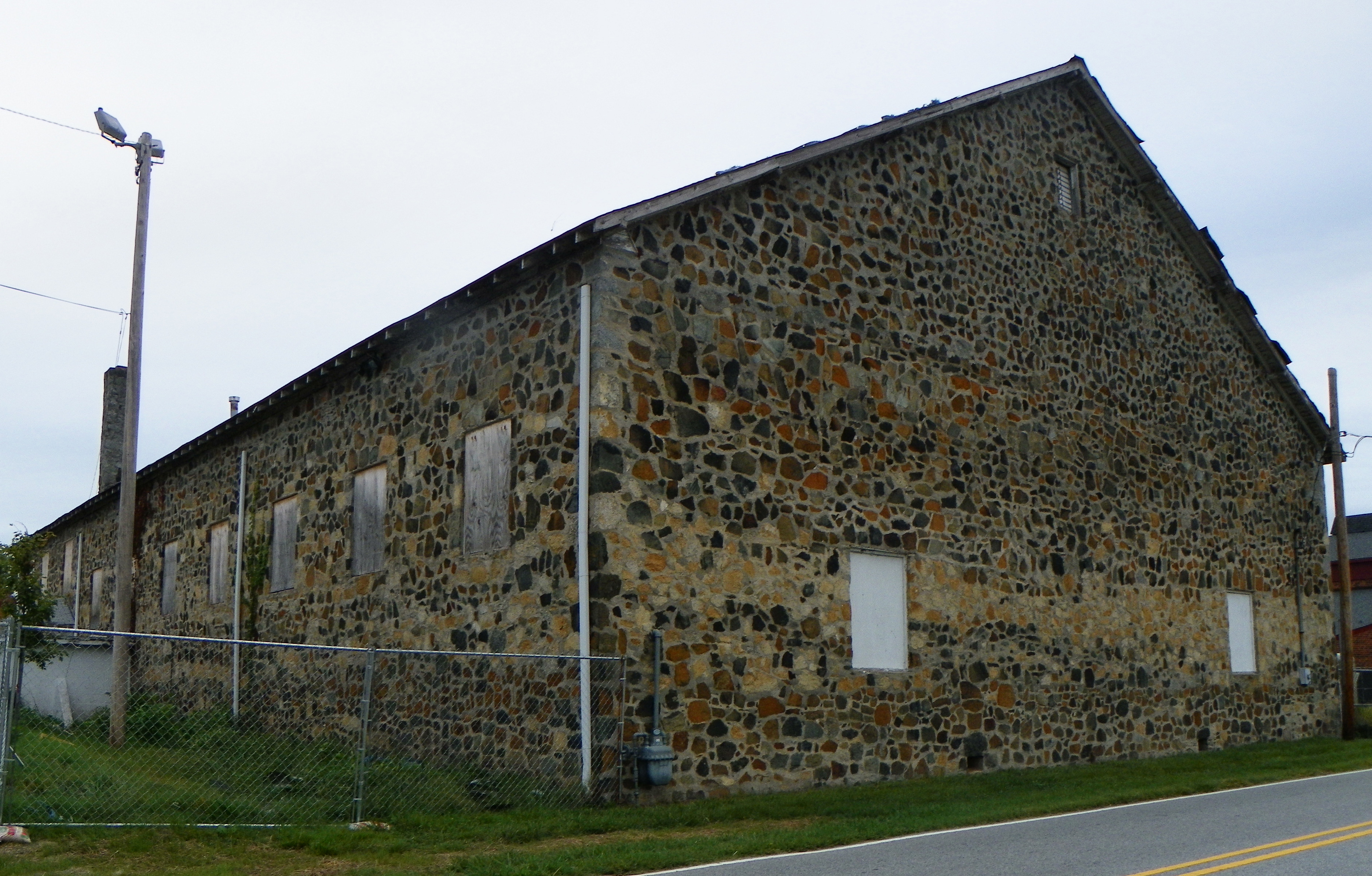
- Rock Gym, September 2014

- Location within North Carolina Location within the United States
- Location: 1201 E. Fairfield Rd., High Point, North Carolina
- Coordinates: 35°55′33″N 79°57′38″W
- Area: 1 acre (0.40 ha)
- Built: 1938-1939
- Architectural style: Rustic Revival
- NRHP reference No.: 12000574
- Added to NRHP: August 28, 2012

Allen Jay School Rock Gymnasium is a historic gymnasium building located in High Point, Guilford County, North Carolina. Built between 1938 and 1939 as part of a Works Progress Administration (WPA) project at a rural consolidated school, it is a two-story, Rustic Revival-style fieldstone building with two small, one-story additions.

It was listed on the National Register of Historic Places in 2012.
