= John Haley House =

Historic house in North Carolina, United States

- U.S. National Register of Historic Places
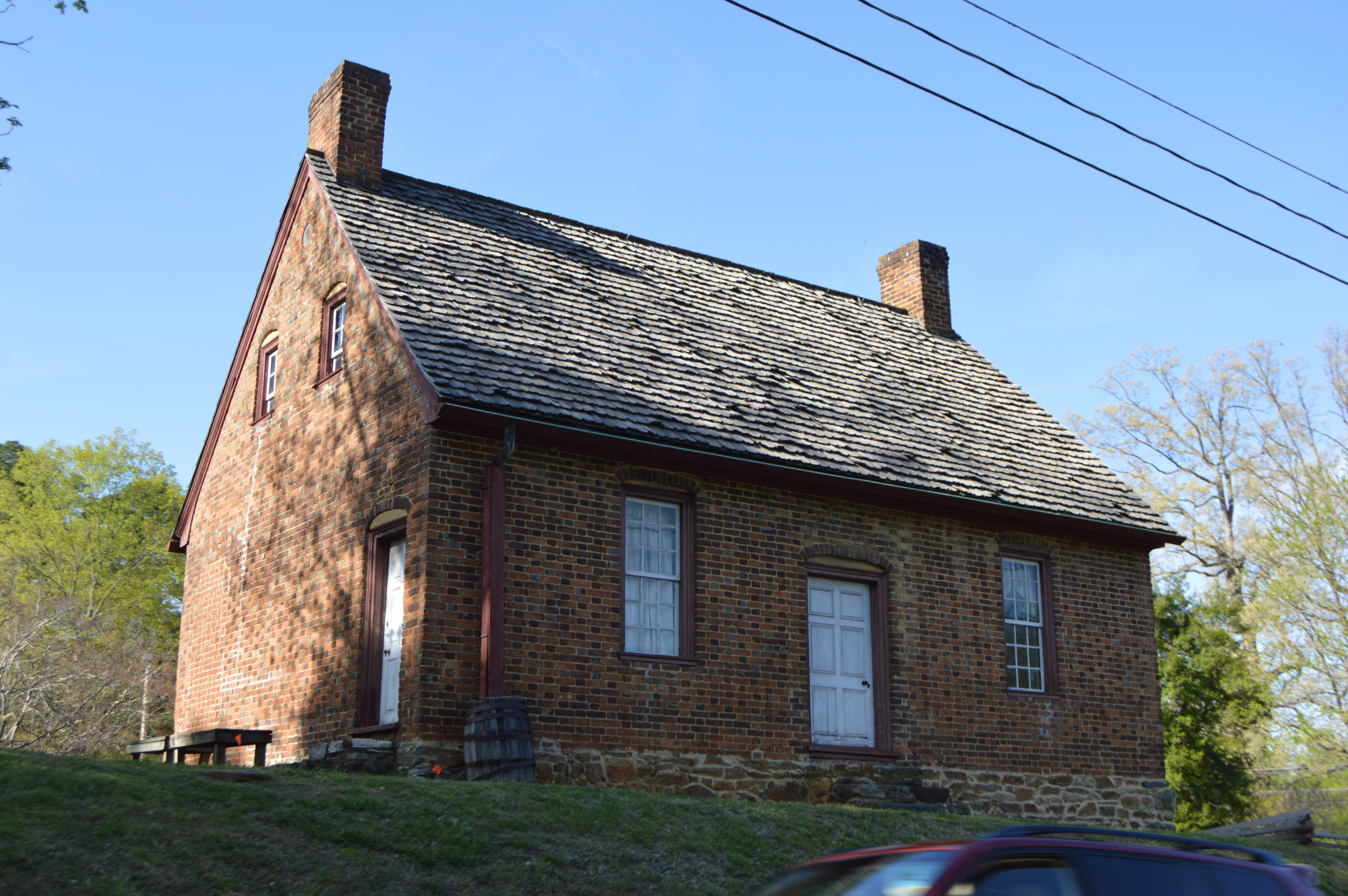
- Front and western side

- Location within North Carolina Location within the United States
- Location: 1805 E. Lexington Ave., High Point, North Carolina
- Coordinates: 35°58′49″N 79°59′42″W
- Area: 4.2 acres (1.7 ha)
- Built: 1786
- NRHP reference No.: 71000587
- Added to NRHP: August 26, 1971

John Haley House is a historic home located at High Point, Guilford County, North Carolina. It was built in 1786, and is a small, one-story brick dwelling. It has a gable roof and sits on a stone foundation. The interior is based on a Quaker plan. The John Haley House is believed to be the oldest dwelling in High Point.

It was listed on the National Register of Historic Places in 1971.
