= Sherrod Park =

Historic district in North Carolina, United States

- U.S. National Register of Historic Places
- U.S. Historic district
- Location within North Carolina Location within the United States
- Location: 200-300 blocks Woodrow Ave., High Point, North Carolina
- Coordinates: 35°58′08″N 80°00′28″W
- Area: 18 acres (7.3 ha)
- Built: 1926
- Architect: Shelton, R. E.; Montgomery, Pickett
- Architectural style: Colonial Revival, Bungalow/craftsman, Tudor Revival
- NRHP reference No.: 91000278
- Added to NRHP: March 14, 1991

Sherrod Park is a national historic district located at High Point, Guilford County, North Carolina. The district encompasses 73 contributing buildings and 1 contributing site in a residential section of High point developed between 1926 and 1941. They include notable examples of Tudor Revival, Colonial Revival, and Bungalow / American Craftsman style architecture.

It was listed on the National Register of Historic Places in 1991.
