= Model Farm (High Point, North Carolina) =

Historic house in North Carolina, United States

- U.S. National Register of Historic Places
- Location within North Carolina Location within the United States
- Location: 2058 Brentwood St., High Point, North Carolina
- Coordinates: 35°56′17″N 79°58′42″W
- Area: 1.99 acres (0.81 ha)
- Built: 1867
- Architectural style: L-Plan House
- NRHP reference No.: 11000208
- Added to NRHP: April 20, 2011

Model Farm, also known as Swarthmore Farm, is a historic home located at High Point, Guilford County, North Carolina. It was built about 1867, and is a 2 1/2-story, triple-A roofed, side-gabled, L-plan, frame building with 12 rooms. It is sheathed in weatherboard and sits on a brick foundation. The front facade has a full-width, one-story hip-roofed porch. The house is associated with an important program of the Quakers to improve agricultural endeavors in the South in the decades after the American Civil War.

It was listed on the National Register of Historic Places in 2011.
