= Spurgeon House =

Historic house in North Carolina, United States

- U.S. National Register of Historic Places
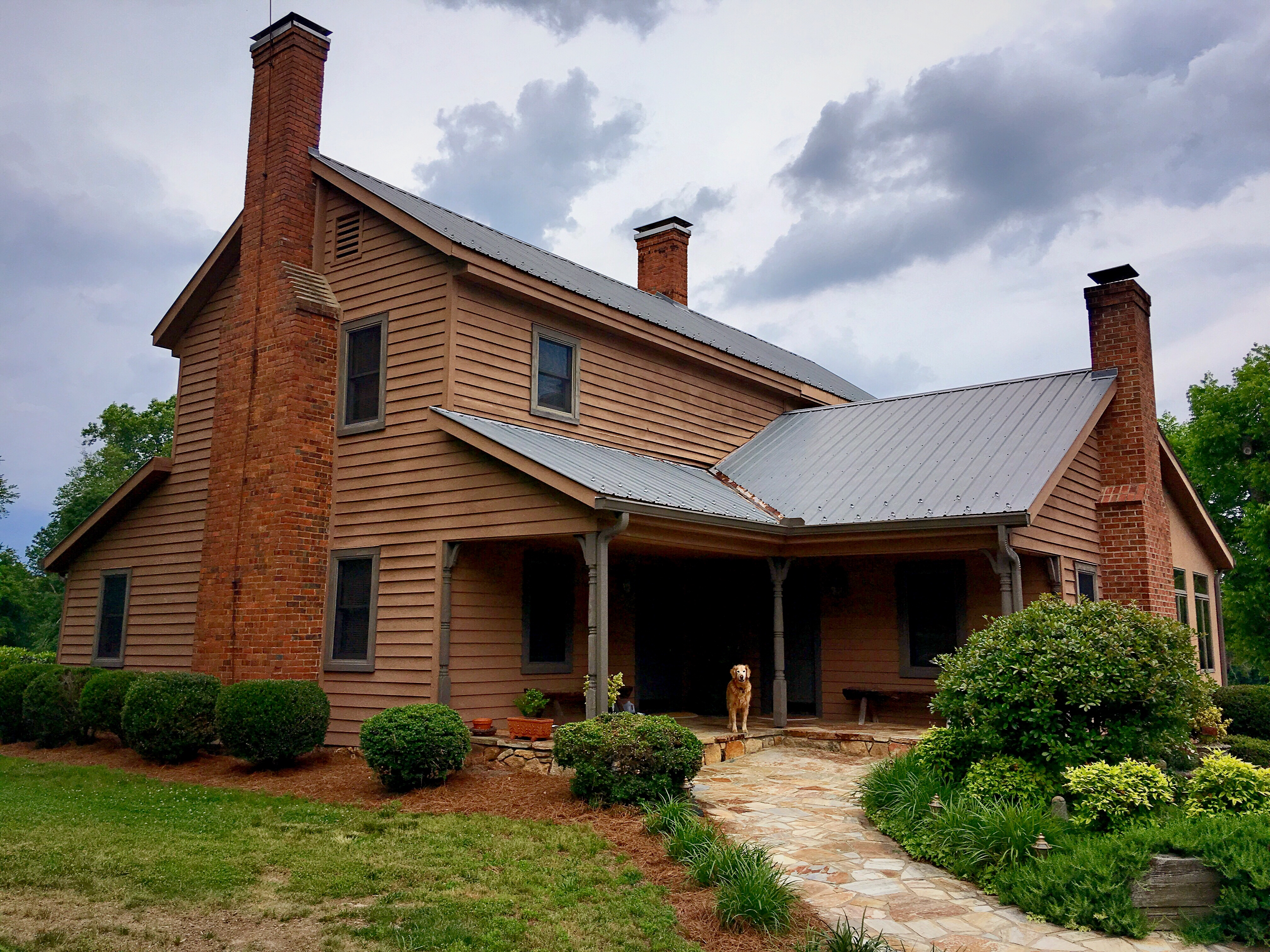

- Location within North Carolina Location within the United States
- Location: West of High Point, near High Point, North Carolina
- Coordinates: 35°59′15″N 80°05′19″W
- Area: 10 acres (4.0 ha)
- Built: c. 1845
- Built by: Welch, Elijah
- Architectural style: Federal, Greek Revival
- NRHP reference No.: 83001877
- Added to NRHP: April 20, 1983

Spurgeon House is a historic home near High Point, Davidson County, North Carolina. It was built about 1854 and is a two-story frame dwelling with Late Federal and Greek Revival design elements. It has an irregular configuration with a 1 1/2-story wing and two-story addition. Also on the property are contributing outbuildings including a kitchen, slave house, spring house, smokehouse, chickenhouse, two frame barns, a frame carriage house, and a log root cellar.

It was added to the National Register of Historic Places in 1983.
