= J. C. Siceloff House =

Historic house in North Carolina, United States

- U.S. National Register of Historic Places
- U.S. Historic district – Contributing property
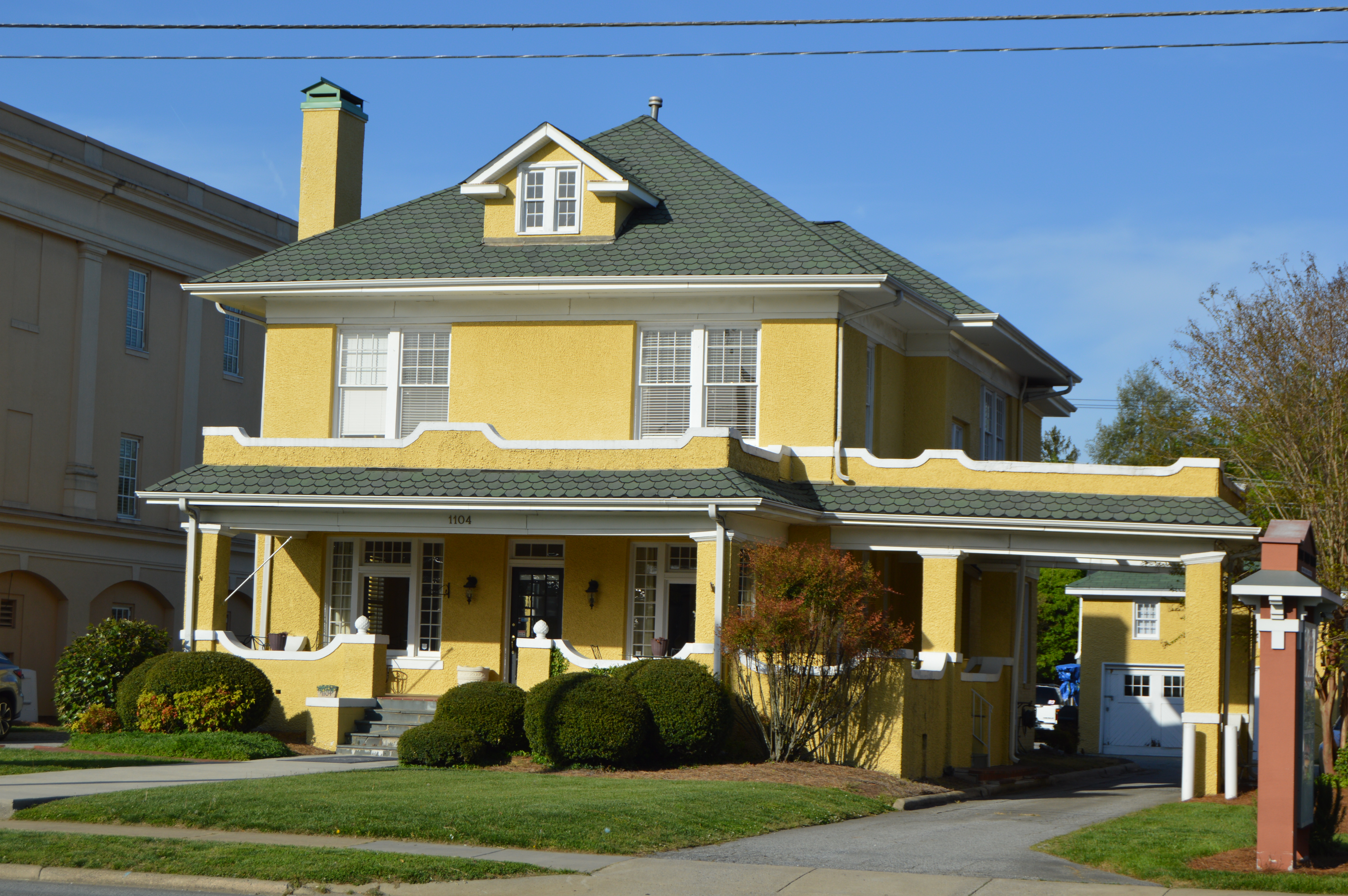
- Front

- Location within North Carolina Location within the United States
- Location: 1104 N. Main St., High Point, North Carolina
- Coordinates: 35°58′9″N 80°0′55″W
- Area: less than one acre
- Built: c. 1920
- Architectural style: Colonial Revival, Prairie School, Mission/spanish Revival
- NRHP reference No.: 91000264
- Added to NRHP: March 14, 1991

J. C. Siceloff House is a historic home located at High Point, Guilford County, North Carolina. It was built about 1920, and is a two-story, stuccoed brick dwelling with Colonial Revival, Mission Revival, and Prairie School design elements. Additions were constructed in the 1930s. It has a low hipped roof with widely overhanging boxed eaves and a dormer, stuccoed chimneys, and front porch and porte-cochère. Also on the property is a contributing garage. The building has been converted to office use.

It was listed on the National Register of Historic Places in 1991. It is located in the Uptown Suburbs Historic District.
