= Uptown Suburbs Historic District =

Historic district in North Carolina, United States

- U.S. National Register of Historic Places
- U.S. Historic district
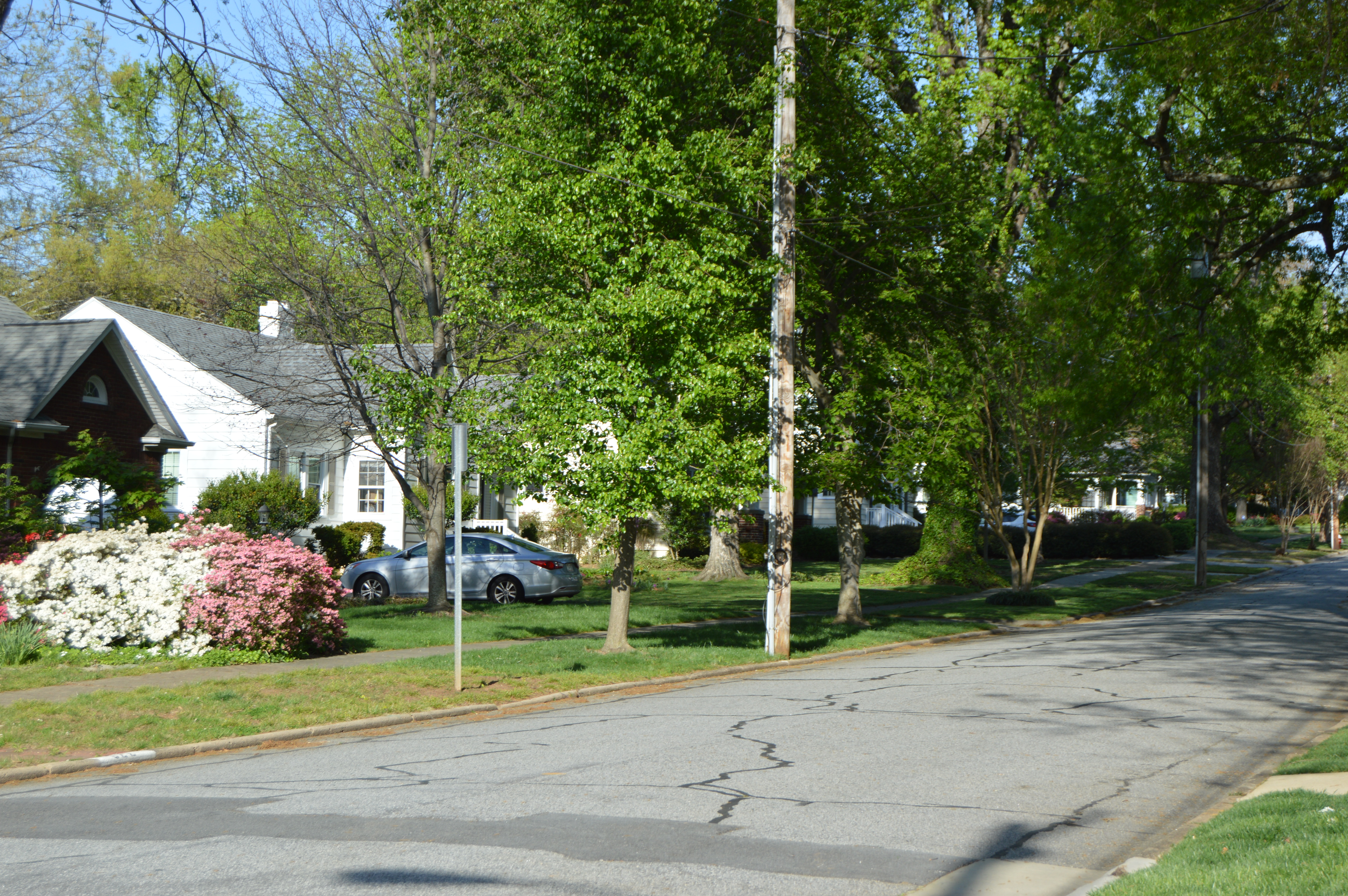
- Scene on Otteray Avenue

- Location within North Carolina Location within the United States
- Location: Roughly bounded by W. Lexington & Sunset Aves., Westchester Dr., Johnson & W. Ray Sts., High Point, North Carolina
- Coordinates: 35°58′09″N 80°01′23″W
- Area: 330 acres (130 ha)
- Built: 1903
- Built by: Robert Connor
- Architect: Harry Barton
- Architectural style: Colonial Revival, Tudor Revival, Bungalow/Craftsman
- NRHP reference No.: 12001158
- Added to NRHP: January 9, 2013

Uptown Suburbs Historic District, also known as Johnson Place, Sheraton Hill, The Parkway, Roland Park, and Emerywood, is a national historic district located at High Point, Guilford County, North Carolina. The district encompasses 759 contributing buildings, 2 contributing sites, and 12 contributing structures in a predominantly middle- to upper-class residential section of High Point. They were built between 1903 and 1963 and include notable examples of Colonial Revival architecture, Tudor Revival architecture, and Bungalow / American Craftsman architecture. Located in the district and listed separately are the Lucy and J. Vassie Wilson House, Dr. C. S. Grayson House, Hardee Apartments, J. C. Siceloff House, John H. Adams House, and A. E. Taplin Apartment Building. Another notable building is the Sidney Halstead Tomlinson House (c. 1924).

It was listed on the National Register of Historic Places in 2013.
