= Highland Cotton Mills Village Historic District =

Historic district in North Carolina, United States

- U.S. National Register of Historic Places
- U.S. Historic district
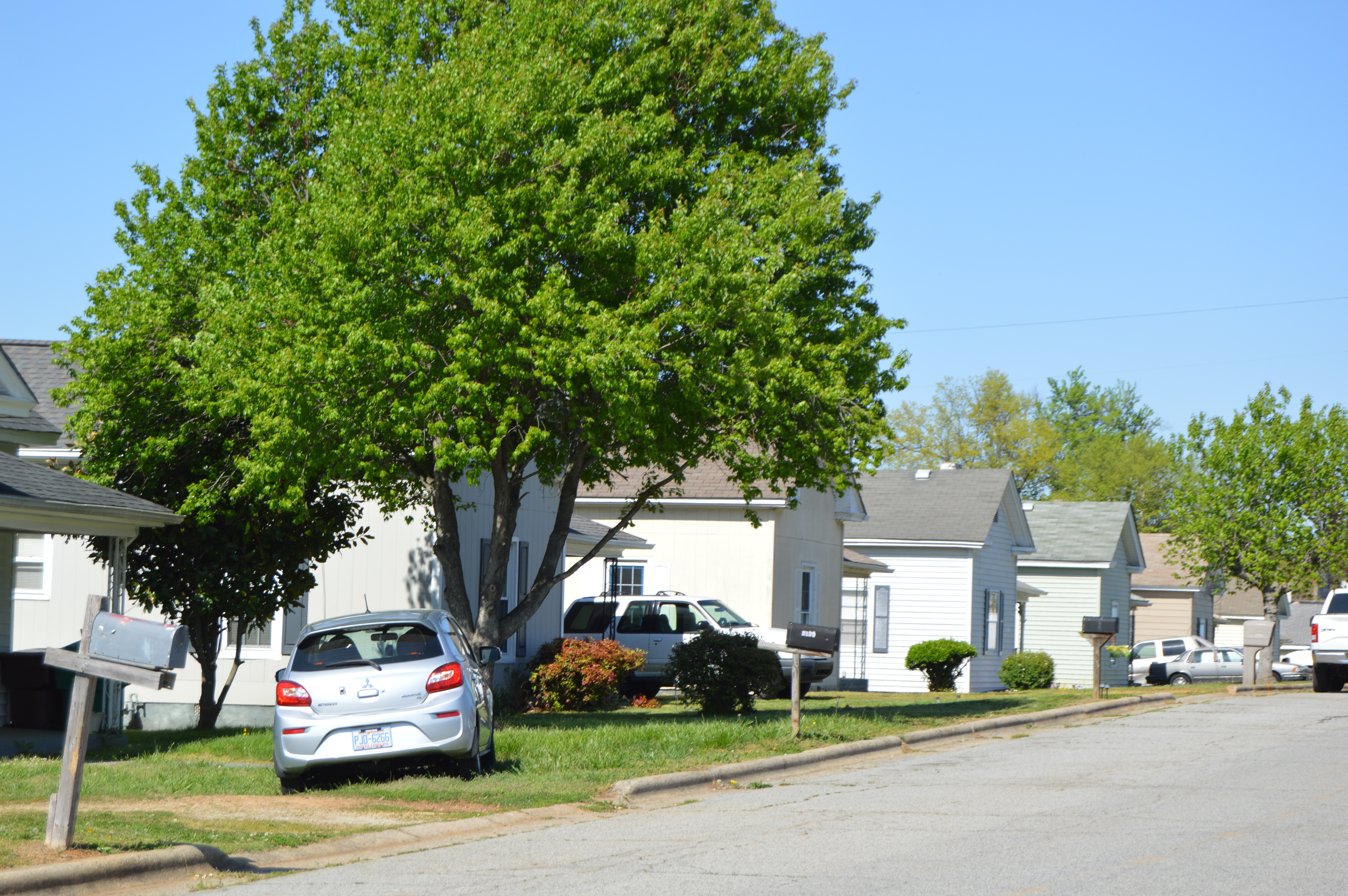
- Houses on Textile Place

- Location within North Carolina Location within the United States
- Location: Roughly bounded by W. Market Center Dr., Connor, Jordan & Young Pls., S. Elm St., High Point, North Carolina
- Coordinates: 35°56′10″N 80°00′43″W
- Area: 69 acres (28 ha)
- Built: 1913
- Architect: Leon A. Schute
- NRHP reference No.: 14000263
- Added to NRHP: May 23, 2014

Highland Cotton Mills Village Historic District is a historic mill village and national historic district located at High Point, Guilford County, North Carolina. The district encompasses 177 contributing buildings (165 are mill houses) and 1 contributing structure. They include the two mills and the shipping and packing building at the Highland Cotton Mills, the Highland Cotton Mills Office, the Highland Methodist Church and its parsonage, the Johnson Farm House.

It was listed on the National Register of Historic Places in 2014.
