= West High Street Historic District (High Point, North Carolina) =

Historic district in North Carolina, United States

- U.S. National Register of Historic Places
- U.S. Historic district
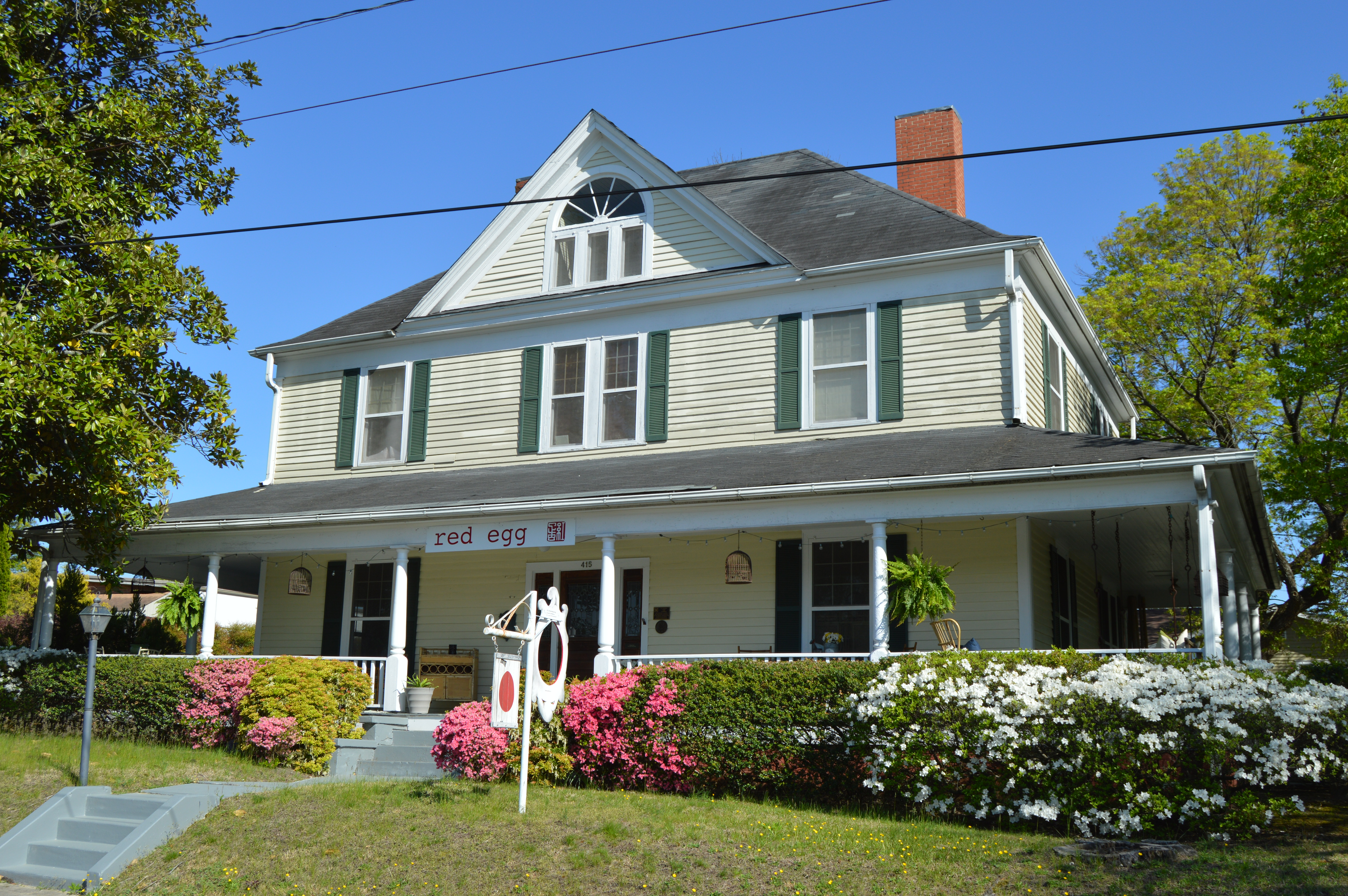
- 415 W. High

- Location within North Carolina Location within the United States
- Location: 407,409,415,501,503 and 507 W. High St., 106,107 and 110 Oak St., High Point, North Carolina
- Coordinates: 35°57′20″N 80°0′41″W
- Built: 1879-1922
- Architectural style: Queen Anne, Bungalow/Craftsman
- NRHP reference No.: 07000295
- Added to NRHP: April 12, 2007

West High Street Historic District is a national historic district located at High Point, Guilford County, North Carolina. The district encompasses 10 contributing buildings and 1 contributing site. The resources were built between 1879 and 1922 and include six houses, three outbuildings, the Kirkman House garden, and the Kirkman Manufacturing Company (1899). Located in the district are the separately listed Blair School and O. Arthur Kirkman House and Outbuildings. Other buildings are the Queen Anne style Annettie Brown House (1897); the Colonial Revival style Fraser-Wilson House (1905) and W. T. Kirkman House (1900); and the brick Colonial Revival / American Craftsman-style O. Arthur Kirkman House (1915).

It was listed on the National Register of Historic Places in 2007.
