= Oakwood Historic District (High Point, North Carolina) =

Historic district in North Carolina, United States

- U.S. National Register of Historic Places
- U.S. Historic district
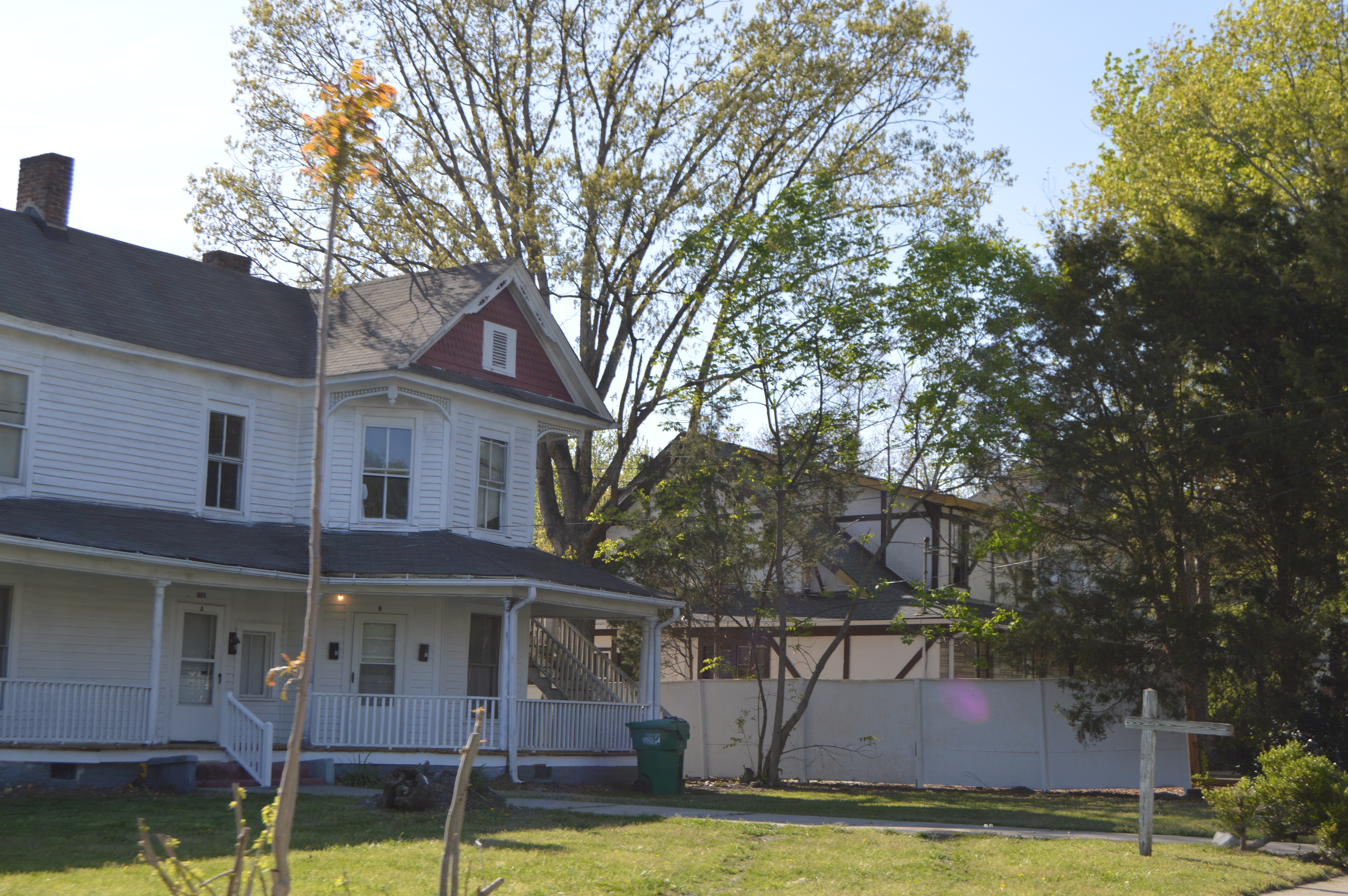
- Western side of Oakwood Street

- Location within North Carolina Location within the United States
- Location: 100-300 blocks Oakwood St., High Point, North Carolina
- Coordinates: 35°57′22″N 80°00′48″W
- Area: 12 acres (4.9 ha)
- Built: 1902
- Architect: Benjamin A. Best
- Architectural style: Colonial Revival, Bungalow/craftsman, Queen Anne
- NRHP reference No.: 90002197
- Added to NRHP: February 7, 1991

Oakwood Historic District is a national historic district located in High Point, Guilford County, North Carolina. The district encompasses 28 contributing buildings in a residential section of High Point developed between 1902 and 1927. They include notable examples of Queen Anne, Colonial Revival, and Bungalow / American Craftsman style architecture.

It was listed on the National Register of Historic Places in 1991.
