= Bernita Sims =

American politician

Mayor of High Point, North Carolina
- In office December 3, 2012 – September 10, 2014
- Preceded by: Becky Smothers
- Succeeded by: Bill Bencini

High Point City Council member, Ward 1
- In office December 2003 – December 2012

Personal details
- Party: Democratic
- Education: University of the District of Columbia; University of North Carolina Wilmington

Bernita Sims was the mayor of High Point, North Carolina. She was elected November 6, 2012 with 33% of the vote. Sims, a Democrat, was the city's first African American mayor.

On November 18, 2013, Sims was indicted by a Guilford County grand jury for allegedly writing a worthless $7,000 check. She resigned on September 10, 2014, after pleading guilty to a felony worthless check charge.

== Criminal charges and resignation ==
On November 18, 2013, Sims was indicted by a Guilford County grand jury for allegedly writing a worthless $7,000 check as part of an estate settlement. The bill of indictment said Sims "unlawfully, willfully, and feloniously did draw, make, utter or issue and deliver to [Annie Ponce]" a check from a First Bank account in High Point that Sims "knew at the time ... did not have sufficient funds on deposit with the bank with which to pay the check." On November 19, 2013, Sims turned herself in at the High Point magistrate's office. She was later released by the magistrate on a $10,000 unsecured bond.

On September 10, 2014, Mayor Bernita Sims pleaded guilty to a felony worthless check charge and resigned as mayor. She was sentenced to a four to 14-month suspended sentence and five years probation and was fined $500. According to her attorney, Sims had already made a $7,000 restitution payment. Mayor Pro Tem Jim Davis assumed Sims's duties as mayor for the remainder of her term. On November 4, 2014, Bill Bencini was elected as her successor.
