= Kilby Hotel =

Demolished historic building in North Carolina, US

- U.S. National Register of Historic Places
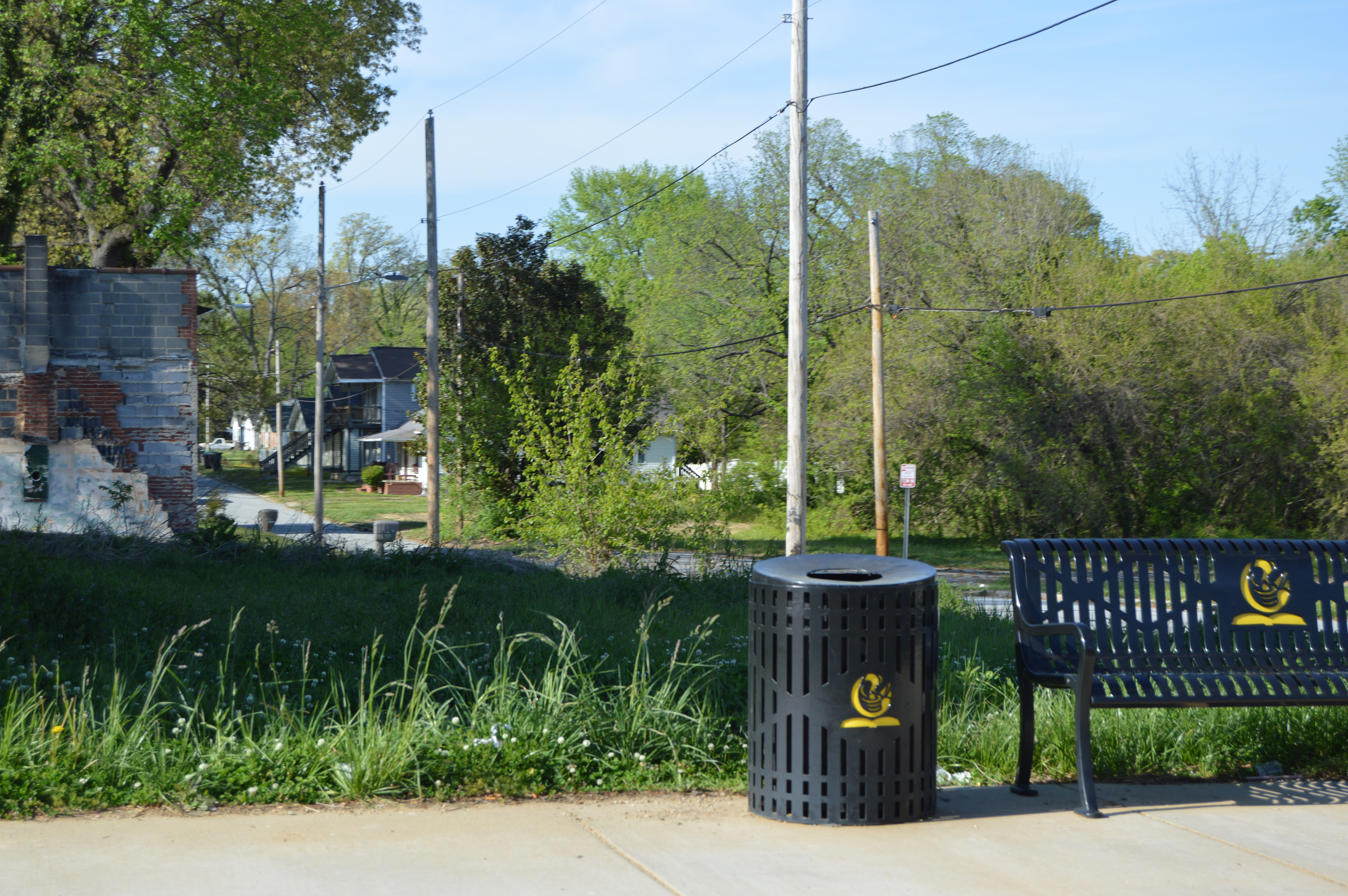
- Site of the hotel

- Location within North Carolina Location within the United States
- Location: 627 E. Washington St., High Point, North Carolina
- Coordinates: 35°57′40″N 80°0′2″W
- Area: less than one acre
- Built: 1910
- Architectural style: Early Commercial
- NRHP reference No.: 82003460
- Added to NRHP: April 22, 1982

Kilby Hotel was a historic hotel building located at High Point, Guilford County, North Carolina. It was built in 1910, and is a three-story, brick building with shops on its first story. It has a shallow bracketed canopy, fine brickwork, and arched windows. The hotel was one of High Point's most important black owned businesses and served predominantly African-American patrons.

It was listed on the National Register of Historic Places in 1982. In 2012, the structure was deemed unsafe, and it was demolished in 2014 after two of its walls collapsed in a storm.
