= O. Arthur Kirkman House and Outbuildings =

Historic house in North Carolina, United States

- U.S. National Register of Historic Places
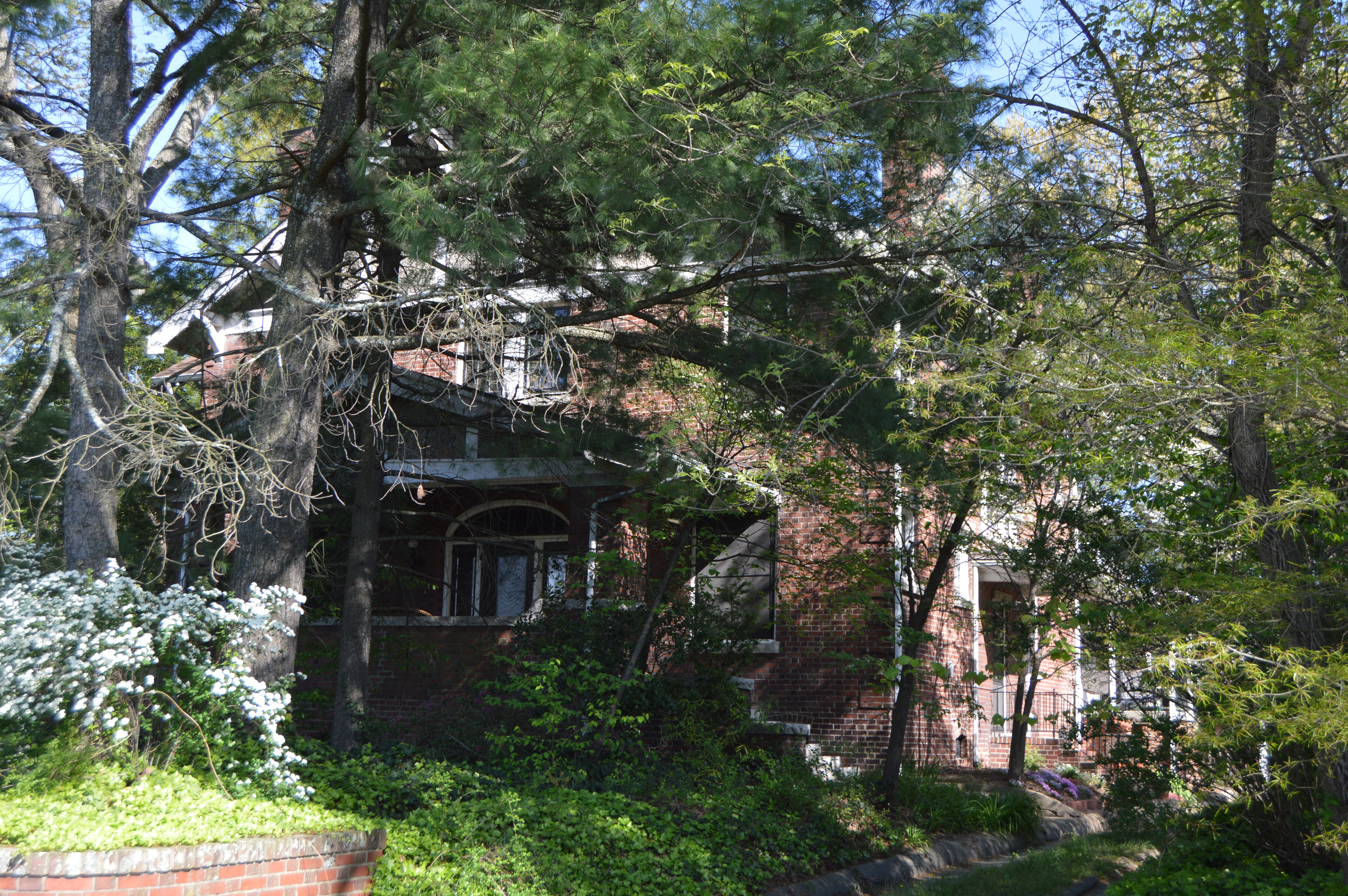
- Front of the house

- Location within North Carolina Location within the United States
- Location: 501 W. High St., High Point, North Carolina
- Coordinates: 35°57′13″N 80°0′42″W
- Area: 1.5 acres (0.61 ha)
- Built: 1913
- Built by: O. Arthur Kirkman, Sr.
- Architectural style: Colonial Revival, Bungalow/craftsman, Tudor Revival
- NRHP reference No.: 87002567
- Added to NRHP: January 28, 1988

O. Arthur Kirkman House and Outbuildings is a historic urban estate located at High Point, Guilford County, North Carolina. Its main house, built in 1913, is a two-story brick dwelling with design elements from the Colonial Revival, Tudor Revival, and Bungalow / American Craftsman. It has a steep pitched gable roof, wide eaves with decorative brackets, and stained glass windows. In addition, the property displays a contributing detached, single car garage (1913), a brick dog house (1913), a depot (1916-1917), an office (pre-1913), and the former Blair School (c. 1911).

It was listed on the National Register of Historic Places in 1988.
