= First Baptist Church (High Point, North Carolina) =

Historic church in North Carolina, United States

- U.S. National Register of Historic Places
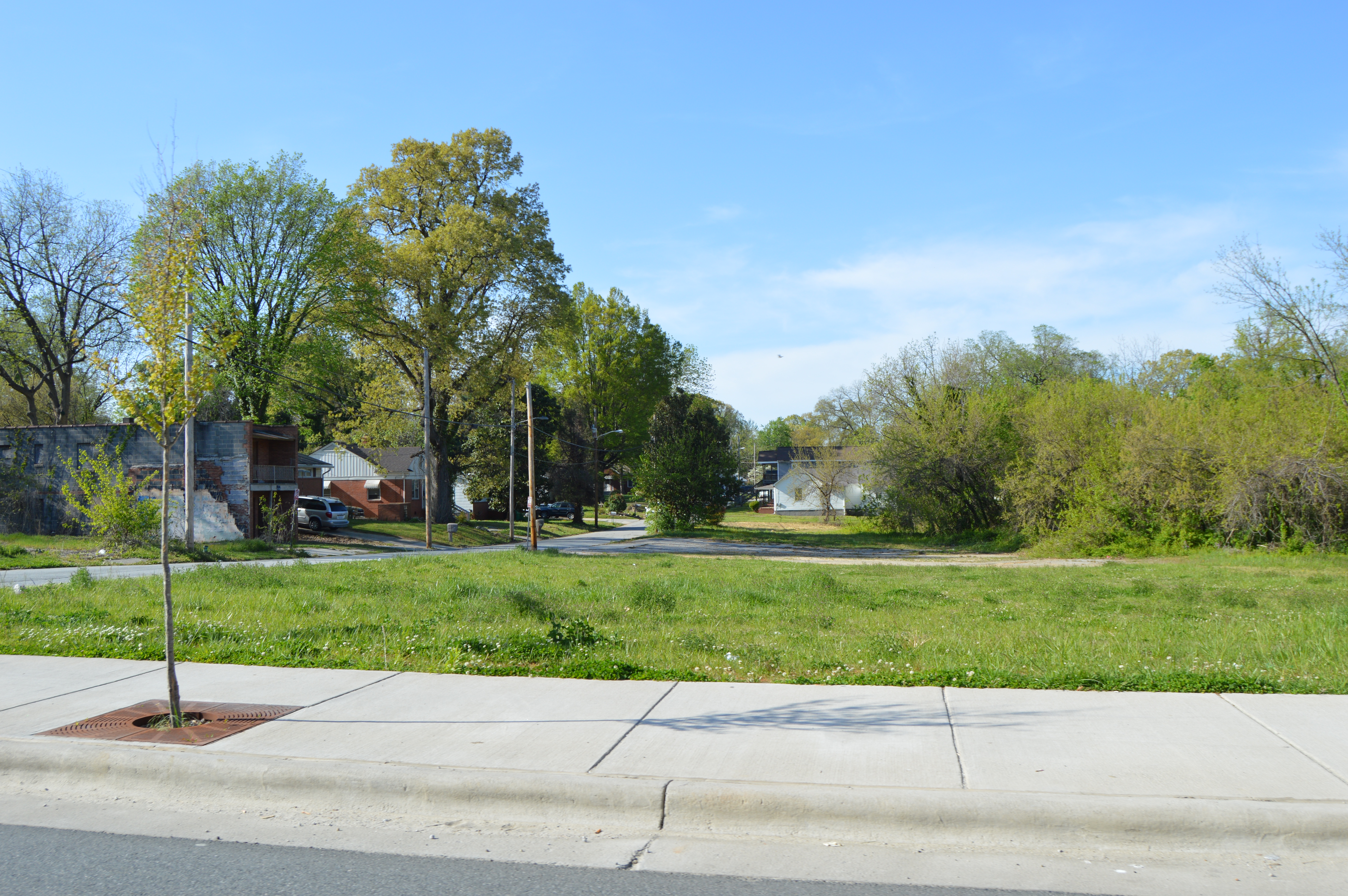
- Site of the church

- Location within North Carolina Location within the United States
- Location: 701 E. Washington Dr., High Point, North Carolina
- Coordinates: 35°57′41″N 79°59′59″W
- Area: less than one acre
- Built: 1907
- Architectural style: Late Gothic Revival
- NRHP reference No.: 08001289
- Added to NRHP: January 8, 2009

First Baptist Church was a historic African-American Baptist church located in High Point, Guilford County, North Carolina. The Late Gothic Revival-style brick church was built in 1907. It was significantly remodeled, enlarged, and a new facade added in the early-1950s. The church was slated for demolition in September 2013 and was demolished in September 2015.

It was listed on the National Register of Historic Places in 2009.
