= High Point, North Carolina =

City in North Carolina, United States

High Point
- City
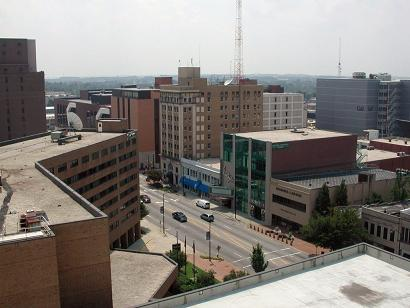
- Downtown High Point

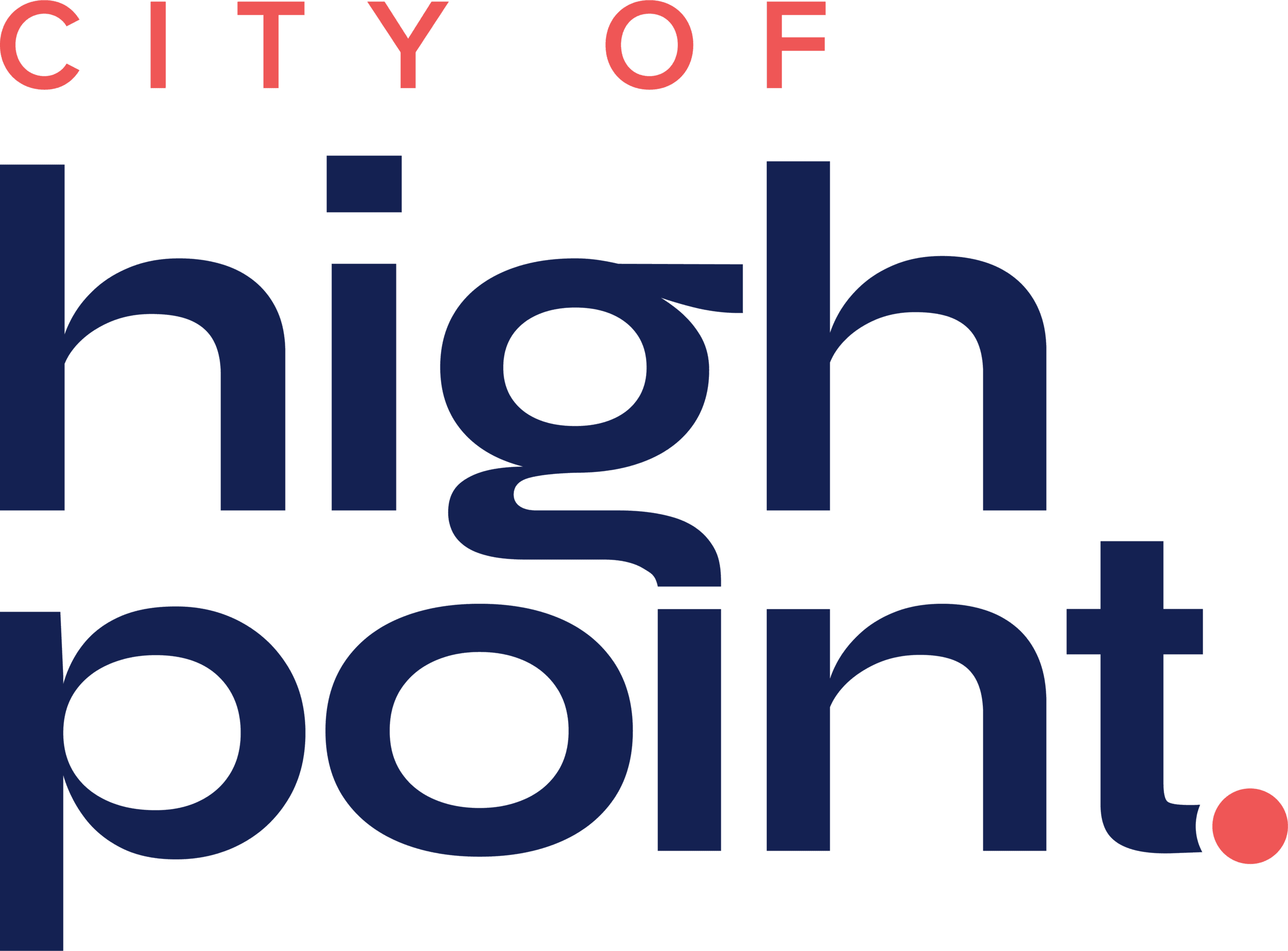
- Flag Seal Logo
- Nicknames: North Carolina's International City, Home Furnishings and Hosiery Capital of the World, City of the Future, HP, Hype Point, The Pocket, The Point
- Interactive map of High Point
- Location within North Carolina Location within the United States
- Coordinates: 35°59′28″N 79°59′37″W
- Country: United States
- State: North Carolina
- Counties: Guilford, Davidson, Forsyth, Randolph
- Chartered: May 26, 1859
- Named for: Highest point of the 1856 North Carolina Railroad

Government
  - Mayor: Cyril Jefferson (D)

Area
  - Total: 58.43 sq mi (151.33 km^{2})
  - Land: 56.91 sq mi (147.39 km^{2})
  - Water: 1.52 sq mi (3.94 km^{2}) 2.60%
- Elevation: 866 ft (264 m)

Population (2020)
  - Total: 114,059
  - Estimate (2023): 116,926
  - Rank: 259th in the United States; 9th in North Carolina
  - Density: 2,004.3/sq mi (773.87/km^{2})
  - Urban: 167,830 (US: 217th)
  - Urban density: 1,665/sq mi (642.9/km^{2})
  - Metro: 789,842 (US: 78th)
- Time zone: UTC−5 (EST)
  - Summer (DST): UTC−4 (EDT)
- ZIP Codes: 27260–27265
- Area code: 336
- FIPS code: 37-31400
- GNIS feature ID: 2404696
- Primary Airport: Piedmont Triad International Airport
- Public transportation: Piedmont Authority for Regional Transportation; Hi tran
- Website: www.highpointnc.gov

High Point is a city in Guilford County, North Carolina, located south and southwest of Greensboro, inside the Piedmont Triad region of the U.S. state of North Carolina. Outskirts of High Point also extends into Randolph, Davidson, and Forsyth counties. The city was of a total population of 114,059 at the 2020 census. High Point is the ninth-most populous city in North Carolina, the third-largest city in the Piedmont Triad, and the 259th-most populous city in the U.S.

Major industries in High Point include furniture, textiles, and bus manufacturing. The official slogan of the city is "North Carolina's International City" due to the semi-annual High Point Furniture Market that attracts 100,000 exhibitors and buyers from around the world. It is home to High Point University, a private Methodist-affiliated institution founded in 1924.

The incumbent mayor of High Point is Cyril Jefferson.

== History ==
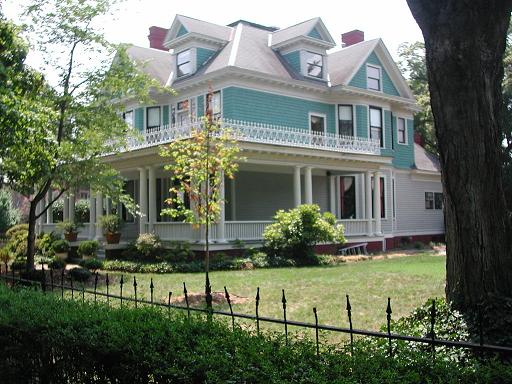
Queen Anne Ecker House of 1908 in High Point

High Point was at the highest point of the 1856 North Carolina Railroad between Charlotte and Goldsboro, where it intersected the 1852 Great Western Plank Road. Its central location and transportation allowed for the delivery of raw materials like cotton and lumber as well as import and export of processed goods, contributing to its early growth. High Point was settled by Europeans, including English Quakers and German immigrants, before 1750, but was not incorporated until 1859. Before it became a major manufacturing center, the most important industries were tobacco, woodworking and textiles. The High Point furniture factory opened in 1889. High Point College was founded in 1924 as a private Methodist-affiliated institution. The college later became a liberal arts university, now with approximately 4,400 undergraduate and graduate students from 51 countries and 46 states.

== Geography ==
High Point is the only city in North Carolina that exists within four counties: Davidson, Forsyth, Guilford and Randolph. It also stands within two major watersheds: the Yadkin–Pee Dee to the west and the Cape Fear to the east. Parts of the city rise above 1,000 feet (300 m), making it among the highest cities in North Carolina's Piedmont.

High Point is bordered by Greensboro to the north and northeast, Jamestown to the northeast, and Archdale to the southeast. The city limits of Trinity and Thomasville come within half a mile of the city limits of High Point limits to the south and southwest, respectively.

According to the United States Census Bureau, the city has a total area of 58.43 square miles (151.3 km^{2}), of which 56.91 square miles (147.4 km^{2}) is land and 1.52 square miles (3.9 km^{2}) (2.60%) is water.

=== Climate ===
High Point experiences a humid subtropical climate. Summers are hot and humid, and the dew points will often climb to near or even above 70 °F (21 °C) by late June through much of August. Nights usually remain warm, above 70 degrees. Most summers, the hottest day will record a maximum between 96 and 98 °F (36 and 37 °C). About once every 5 to 10 years, the city will climb to or above 100 °F (38 °C). Winters are cool to cold. Nights average near 30 °F (−1 °C), with the coldest averages in the upper 20s from late December through early February. Most winters, the coldest temperature will dip to between 10 and 15 °F (−12 and −9 °C). About once every 10 years, the minimum will dip below 5 °F (−15 °C), and about once every 20 years to near or below 0 °F (−18 °C). Daytime highs average near 50 °F (10 °C) in the winter, with the coldest stretch between late December through early February, with highs averaging in the upper 40s. Most winters there will be 2 to 4 days that remain below freezing. The hottest temperature on record for the area was 103 °F (39 °C) on August 18, 1988 (in nearby Greensboro the high reached 104 °F (40 °C) in 1914), and the coldest was −8 °F (−22 °C) on January 21, 1985.

Rainfall patterns are generally spread evenly throughout the year, with between seven and eleven wet days per month. The city averages around 43 inches (1,100 mm) of rain per year. Snowfall varies from year to year, with most years totaling less than 5 inches (13 cm). However, there are some years that exceed 20 inches (51 cm), and this brings the overall average to more than 8 inches (20 cm) per year. In the winter of 1959/60 the city had just over 30 inches (76 cm) of snowfall, which stands as the most dating back to the start of snowfall record-keeping in 1928. In addition to snowfall, some years the city can be impacted by significant ice storms. Cold air wedging up on the east side of the mountains can lock this part of the state into cold air while warmer moist air moves in aloft. This proximity to the mountains creates what is known as the Appalachian Wedge and can produce crippling ice storms.

High Point was one of several communities affected by a 2010 tornado outbreak. The twister reached its most powerful EF3 classification as it crossed the northern suburbs of the city.

In 1989, High Point sustained minor wind damage from Hurricane Hugo as it raced through the western Piedmont region of North Carolina after making landfall 5 hours away in Charleston, South Carolina.

Climate data for High Point, North Carolina (1991–2020 normals, extremes 1926–present)
Month	Jan	Feb	Mar	Apr	May	Jun	Jul	Aug	Sep	Oct	Nov	Dec	Year
Record high °F (°C)	83 (28)	85 (29)	89 (32)	96 (36)	100 (38)	105 (41)	106 (41)	105 (41)	104 (40)	94 (34)	89 (32)	81 (27)	106 (41)
Mean daily maximum °F (°C)	51.7 (10.9)	56.0 (13.3)	64.1 (17.8)	73.7 (23.2)	80.1 (26.7)	86.5 (30.3)	89.4 (31.9)	88.0 (31.1)	82.4 (28.0)	73.3 (22.9)	62.3 (16.8)	53.8 (12.1)	71.8 (22.1)
Daily mean °F (°C)	41.7 (5.4)	45.2 (7.3)	52.3 (11.3)	61.5 (16.4)	68.8 (20.4)	76.1 (24.5)	79.4 (26.3)	78.1 (25.6)	72.2 (22.3)	61.9 (16.6)	51.4 (10.8)	44.1 (6.7)	61.1 (16.2)
Mean daily minimum °F (°C)	31.6 (−0.2)	34.3 (1.3)	40.5 (4.7)	49.3 (9.6)	57.6 (14.2)	65.7 (18.7)	69.3 (20.7)	68.3 (20.2)	62.1 (16.7)	50.4 (10.2)	40.5 (4.7)	34.4 (1.3)	50.3 (10.2)
Record low °F (°C)	−7 (−22)	−3 (−19)	7 (−14)	22 (−6)	33 (1)	39 (4)	49 (9)	41 (5)	34 (1)	19 (−7)	10 (−12)	0 (−18)	−7 (−22)
Average precipitation inches (mm)	3.83 (97)	3.17 (81)	4.09 (104)	4.05 (103)	3.76 (96)	4.37 (111)	4.56 (116)	5.06 (129)	4.79 (122)	3.27 (83)	3.57 (91)	3.75 (95)	48.27 (1,226)
Average snowfall inches (cm)	1.3 (3.3)	0.0 (0.0)	0.1 (0.25)	0.0 (0.0)	0.0 (0.0)	0.0 (0.0)	0.0 (0.0)	0.0 (0.0)	0.0 (0.0)	0.0 (0.0)	0.0 (0.0)	0.5 (1.3)	1.9 (4.8)
Average precipitation days (≥ 0.01 in)	10.7	8.9	10.6	9.8	10.4	9.8	11.1	9.9	8.5	7.7	8.2	10.7	116.3
Average snowy days (≥ 0.1 in)	0.2	0.1	0.1	0.0	0.0	0.0	0.0	0.0	0.0	0.0	0.0	0.2	0.6
Source: NOAA

== Demographics ==
Historical population
Census	Pop.	Note	%±
1880	991		—
1900	4,163		—
1910	9,525		128.8%
1920	14,302		50.2%
1930	36,745		156.9%
1940	38,495		4.8%
1950	39,973		3.8%
1960	62,063		55.3%
1970	63,229		1.9%
1980	63,380		0.2%
1990	69,428		9.5%
2000	85,839		23.6%
2010	104,371		21.6%
2020	114,059		9.3%
2025 (est.)	120,571		5.7%
U.S. Decennial Census; 2020

=== 2020 census ===
High Point, North Carolina – Racial and ethnic composition Note: the US Census treats Hispanic/Latino as an ethnic category. This table excludes Latinos from the racial categories and assigns them to a separate category. Hispanics/Latinos may be of any race.
Race / ethnicity (NH = Non-Hispanic)	Pop 2000	Pop 2010	Pop 2020	% 2000	% 2010	% 2020
White alone (NH)	50,176	52,612	50,000	58.45%	50.41%	43.84%
Black or African American alone (NH)	27,064	33,983	36,124	31.53%	32.56%	31.67%
Native American or Alaska Native alone (NH)	349	436	403	0.41%	0.42%	0.35%
Asian alone (NH)	2,847	6,302	9,985	3.32%	6.04%	8.75%
Pacific Islander alone (NH)	13	38	47	0.02%	0.04%	0.04%
Some Other Race alone (NH)	139	279	805	0.16%	0.27%	0.71%
Mixed Race or Multi-Racial (NH)	1,054	1,874	3,911	1.23%	1.80%	3.43%
Hispanic or Latino (any race)	4,197	8,847	12,784	4.89%	8.48%	11.21%
Total	85,839	104,371	114,059	100.00%	100.00%	100.00%

As of the 2020 census, there were 114,059 people, 40,877 households, and 25,792 families residing in the city.

=== 2010 census ===
At the 2010 census, there were 104,371 people, and 40,988 households residing in the city. The population density was 1,939.9 people per square mile. There were 46,677 housing units in the city. The racial makeup of the city was 53.6% white (50.4% Non-Hispanic white), 33.0% Black or African American, 0.6% Native American, 6.1% Asian, 0.0% Pacific Islander, and 2.3% from two or more races. Hispanic or Latinos of any race were 8.5% of the population.

=== 2000 census ===
At the 2000 census, there were 85,839 people, 33,519 households, and 22,523 families residing in the city. The population density was 1,750.1 inhabitants per square mile (675.7/km^{2}). There were 35,952 housing units at an average density of 733.0 per square mile (283.0/km^{2}). The racial makeup of the city was 54.56% White, 34.77% African American, 0.46% Native American, 4.45% Asian, 0.02% Pacific Islander, 2.27% from other races, and 1.57% from two or more races. Hispanic or Latino of any race were 6.89% of the population. 12.7% were of American, 8.7% English, 8.3% German and 5.9% Irish ancestry.

There were 33,519 households, of which 32.9% had children under the age of 18 living with them, 46.9% were married couples living together, 16.3% had a female householder with no husband present, and 32.8% were non-families. Of all households, 27.2% were made up of individuals, and 9.5% had someone living alone who was 65 years of age or older. The average household size was 2.49 and the average family size was 3.03.

In the city, the population was spread out, with 26.0% under the age of 18, 9.3% from 18 to 24, 31.8% from 25 to 44, 21.0% from 45 to 64, and 11.9% who were 65 years of age or older. The median age was 34. For every 100 females, there were 91.5 males. For every 100 females age 18 and over, there were 87.6 males.

The median income for a household in the city was $40,137, and the median income for a family was $48,057. Males had a median income of $33,411 versus $25,293 for females. The per capita income for the city was $21,303. About 10.5% of families and 13.2% of the population were below the poverty line, including 18.6% of those under age 18 and 11.4% of those age 65 or over.

== Economy ==
=== Diversification ===
Though historically focused on production of furniture, hosiery, and Hatteras Yachts, High Point diversified its economy by becoming a center for distribution and logistics, customer service, banking, manufacturing, photography and pharmaceuticals. The High Point Market remains important to High Point's economy and the city's furniture industry. Its semi-annual trade show is the largest furniture and furnishings industry event in the world. It is held in April and October of each year. Approximately 12,000,000 square feet (1,100,000 m^{2}) of showroom space is used by 2,300 exhibitors, in 188 separate buildings. Over 100 countries are represented through both vendors and visitors.

=== Evolution of furniture industry ===
High Point was an early center for the development of the furniture industry in the South. Functional furniture had been produced on a small scale since the 17th century by artisans of English ancestry who had settled in North Carolina. As the farming landscape of the South began to change with the end of the Civil War and slavery, cheap labor became available during the Reconstruction Era. The North Carolina furniture industry gained momentum in the late 19th century, and developers were attracted to High Point for its location, transportation, and cheap labor. The city was in the center of the Piedmont region with access to vast hardwood forests in the central and western parts of the state. High Point, at the junction of the railroad and a main state road, provided a centralized shipping point for the southern market. An agricultural depression in the 1890s drove farm workers to developing towns like High Point looking for industrial jobs.

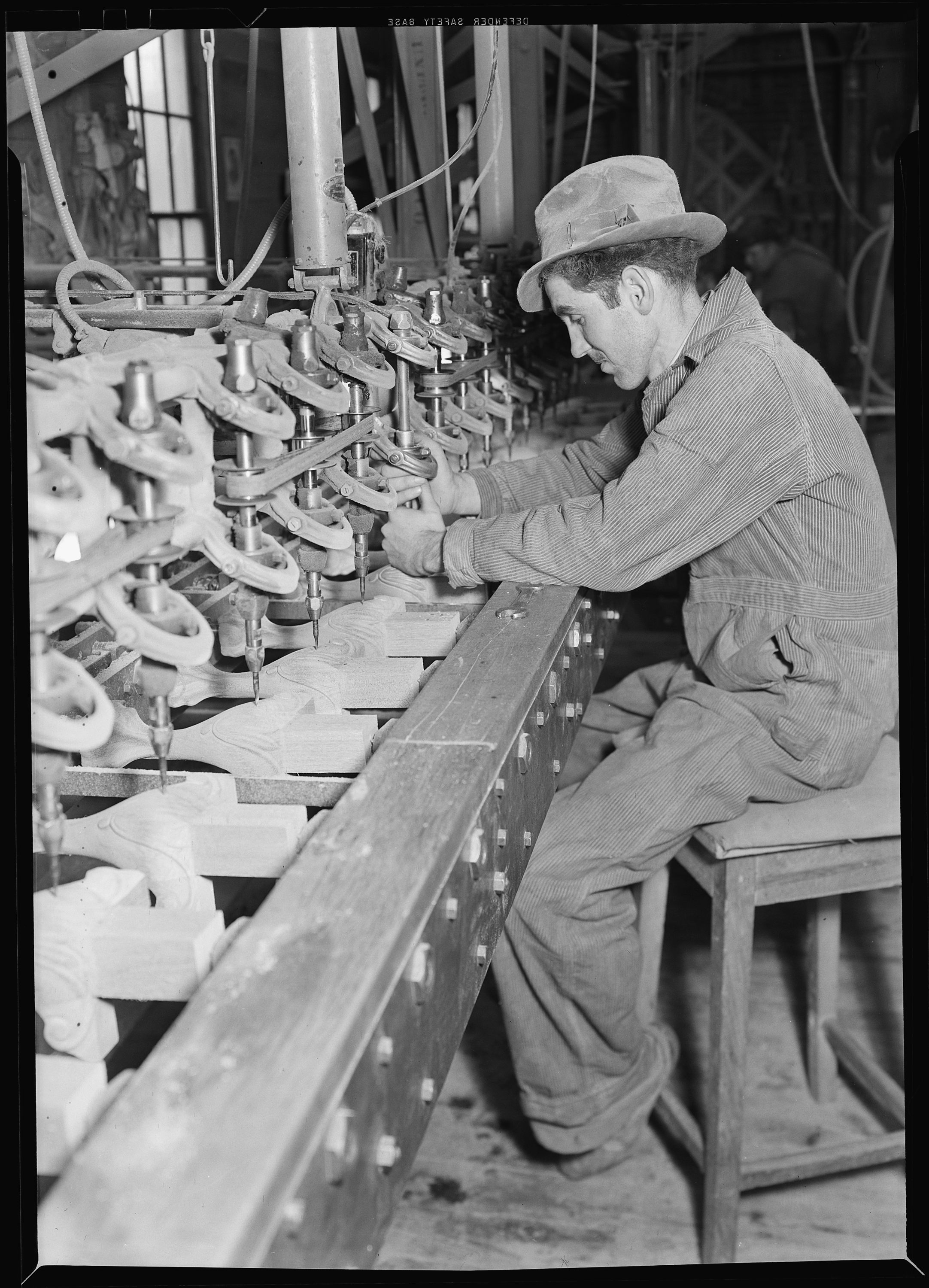
Upholstering at Tomlinson Chair Manufacturing, circa 1936. Photo by Lewis Hine.

Factories were needed to produce affordable wooden household furniture for the southern market. The first furniture company, the High Point Furniture Manufacturing Company, was formed in 1889. Subsequently, from 1890 to 1900, 38 new furniture factories opened in the state, with 13 of those in High Point. The Southern Railway line was formed in 1894, and High Point was shipping eight fully loaded freight cars of furniture each day by 1898. By the turn of the century, High Point had become the leading furniture center in the South, with over 40 furniture companies in the city and the surrounding area. Meanwhile, other manufacturers set up local factories to provide related products like veneers, plate glass, mirrors, paint, and locks to furniture companies.

Profits in the North Carolina furniture industry declined with the increasing number of factories. In addition to the increased competition for market share, by 1910 the salary for competent experienced workers and rising shipping costs had cut further into the profit. Bankruptcies resulted from inexperienced managers who tried to sell products below the cost of production and companies that tried to expand too quickly. An innovative High Point company, Tomlinson Chair Co., devised incentives to give its workforce an opportunity to receive part of the profits. The company was one of the first to manufacture period reproduction dining and living room furniture on a large scale. Employees who exceeded monthly quotas received a percentage bonus. All workers received a life insurance policy as well.

Marketing became important to growth of the furniture industry in North Carolina in the twentieth century. Store owners had to visit the factory to select their orders due to the large size and weight of the furniture. This situation improved at the turn of the century with the mass marketing and sales of North Carolina furniture from the catalogues of Sears Roebuck and Co. At the same time, competitors in large cities like New York and Chicago held a national exposition twice a year to display the manufacturers' products and to take orders from furniture dealers and buyers. Recognizing the need for a more convenient southern location, High Point furniture manufacturers began planning for an exposition to display and sell their product to the public. The first North Carolina furniture exposition was held in High Point in 1905. In 1921, a brand new Southern Furniture Exhibition Building was built with ten stories and 249,000 square feet (23,100 m^{2}) at a cost of $2 million. The event that became known as the High Point Furniture Market was attended by 700 buyers and generated $2.25 million in sales. High Point overtook Chicago as the site of the nation's most important semi-annual furniture show. Gradually the High Point Furniture Market, held in April and October, grew into an internationally renowned furniture trade fair for home furnishings. High Point continues to be the prime U.S. location to purchase brand-name furniture at a substantial discount.

The furniture industry and developing textile manufacturing set the pace for two 20th-century growth booms in High Point. Over the decade of the 1920s, the population grew from 14,302 to 36,745 as $20 million of building permits were issued and $26 million was spent on city improvements. The Great Depression did not seem to affect the southern furniture market, which focused on trendy and affordable furniture, while those in the North focused on traditional, luxurious products. By 1935, North Carolina was second only to New York in US furniture production. Meanwhile, the High Point Market continued to set furniture trends and to be a national economic indicator; the $5 billion in sales in 1947 after World War II forecast a postwar boom. The 1950s' growth of the furniture market mirrored that of High Point's second population boom from 39,973 in 1950 to 62,063 in 1960. By 1959, North Carolina had surpassed New York to become the state employing the most people in the furniture industry. In 1961, The State magazine declared, "High Point, in Guilford County, is the world's leading manufacturing center of wood furniture. It is also the location of one of the nation's principal furniture markets." Four international furniture shows were being hosted by High Point at that time, including the High Point Market (still known then as the Southern Furniture Exposition), which The State reported was drawing crowds of five to six thousand buyers. Throughout the end of the 20th century, North Carolina continued to lead the nation in the production of both upholstered and wooden household furniture. The furniture was slightly styled and inexpensive, but lost its regional characteristics. Some local artisans still maintained a unique and high quality wooden product. High Point became known as the "Furniture Capital of the World" in the 1980s during the golden era of North Carolina furniture manufacturing.

The globalization of the 1990s opened free trade and competition from foreign furniture manufacturers. US companies, unable to compete, began outsourcing to Latin America and Asia. China became the leading manufacturer by producing furniture of equal quality at a lower price. The majority of furniture companies in North Carolina have continued to close since the 1990s. The furniture makers who have maintained a high quality product made from solid wood continue to maintain a unique niche and are sold in both the United States and Asia.

The High Point Museum showcases an exhibit, "High Point's Furniture Heritage", which examines the historical relationship between the furniture industry and the people of High Point. The Bienenstock Furniture Library located in downtown High Point is the largest furniture specialty library in the world and contains over 4,000 furniture and design-specific volumes.

Owing to the dedication of so much of its showroom space for use by the High Point Market, much of downtown High Point lacks the traditional retail and restaurant businesses that characterize other large North Carolina cities, though that sector grew in the city in the 2010s and 2020s, in part due to a customer base present with people involved with High Point University.

=== The High Point Market ===
The High Point Market is the largest home furnishings industry trade show in the world, with over 11 million square feet (1 km^{2}) and about 2,000 exhibitors throughout about 180 buildings. The market holds two major shows each year, and attracts between 70,000 and 80,000 attendees. A 2018 Duke University study showed that the market contributed $6.7 billion to the area's economy. In May 2011, the High Point Market and the Las Vegas World Market Center were combined into the new firm International Market Centers (IMC). In September 2017, Blackstone Inc. and Fireside Investments purchased IMC, which at the time owned 14 buildings totaling 6.7 million square feet, over 50% of the downtown.

=== Top employers ===
According to High Point's 2025 Annual Comprehensive Financial Report, the top employers in the city are:

#	Employer	# of employees
1	Ralph Lauren	3,008
2	Atrium Health Wake Forest Baptist	2,200
3	Aetna	2,200
4	High Point University	2,195
5	Guilford County Schools	1,929
6	Thomas Built Buses	1,917
7	City of High Point	1,402
8	Volvo Group North America	1,000
9	ZIM	844
10	Slane Hosiery Mills - 582	582

== Arts and culture ==
=== Attractions ===
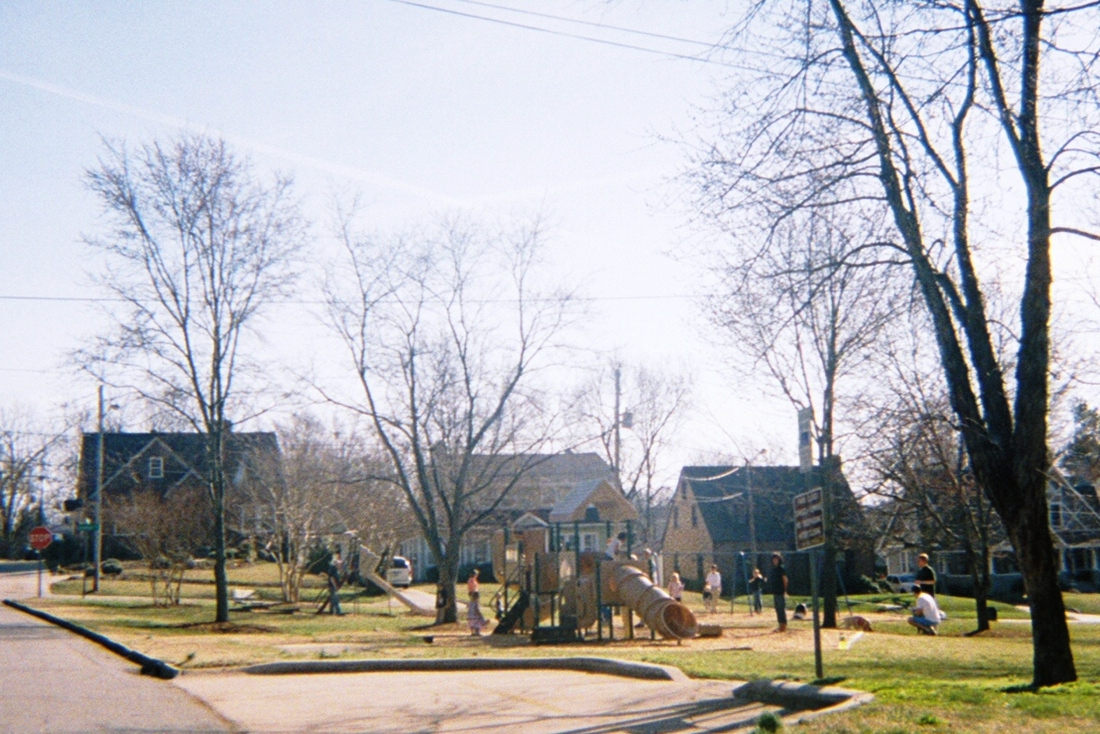
Triangle Park

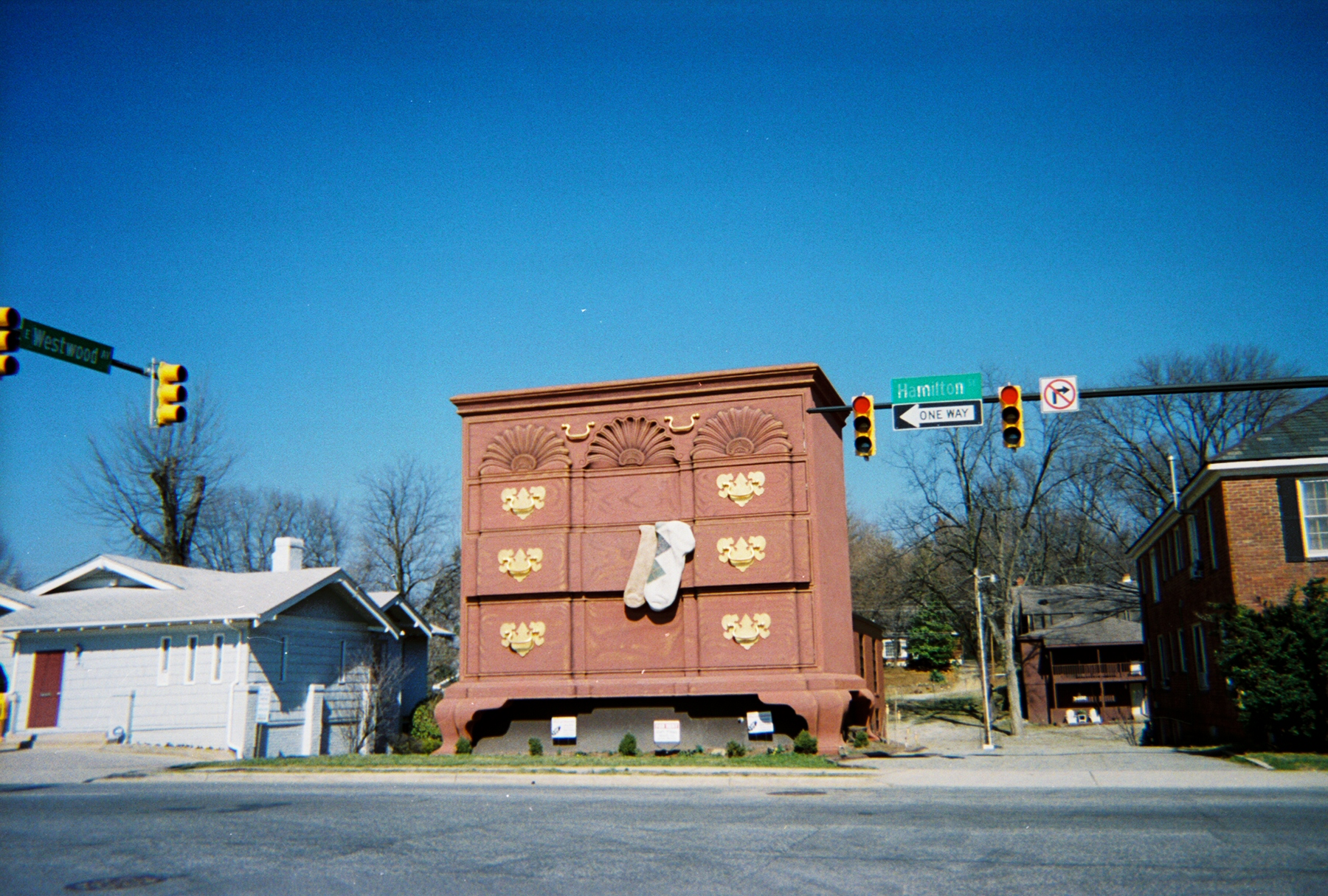
World's largest chest of drawers

- Bernice Bienenstock Furniture Library: World's largest collection of books on the history of furniture and interior design. Home of the Pat Plaxico Sculpture Gardens.
- Castle McCulloch Gold Mill: McCulloch Gold Mill was built in 1832 and operated primarily as a gold processing center serving local gold mining operations. Now open as a special events center.
- High Point City Lake Park: Recreation and amusement park located on the shores of 540-acre (2.2 km^{2}) lake with boating, fishing, paddle boats, picnic areas with shelters, fishing boat and canoe rentals, historic carousel, train, waterslide, largest outdoor swimming pool in the state, miniature golf, gymnasium, playground and excursion boat. Site of annual "Day in the Park" festival each September.
- High Point Community Theatre: Founded in 1976, High Point Community Theatre (HPCT) presents American musicals, dramas and comedies performed by local actors. HPCT also has an education program, featuring classes, workshops and camps for adults, youth and children.
- High Point Museum and Historical Park: Museum commemorating the history of High Point, coupled with interpretative exhibit of log Blacksmith Shop and 1786 Haley House. In 2025, DOGE canceled a $350,000 grant to replace the museum's HVAC system after ChatGPT had flagged it as DEI.
- High Point Public Library: A massive full-service public library contains nearly 400,000 books, music recordings, DVDs, audiobooks, periodicals, newspapers, and a comprehensive collection of books related to history and genealogy equipped with many attractions for Youth and Young Adults.
- Millis Regional Health Education Center: Interactive health education center with features depicting facets of human anatomy and health.
- Museum of Old Domestic Life: Quaker museum established around 1926 in 1858 Springfield Meeting House, containing a broad selection of artifacts from typical colonial Quaker homesteads.
- Piedmont Environmental Center: Features 375 acres (1.5 km^{2}) of hiking trails adjacent to High Point City Lake, nature preserve, small animal exhibits, the North Carolina Mapscape, and access to an eight-mile (13 km) Greenway Trail.
- Rosetta C. Baldwin Museum: The museum was created in November 2000 to honor the legacy of Miss Rosetta C. Baldwin, her family and many African-Americans. The site depicts a typical home of a southern African American family during the mid-twentieth century.
- Sechrest Gallery: Located on the campus of High Point University in the Hayworth Fine Arts Center, the Sechrest Gallery houses permanent collections of 18th and 19th century British Art coupled with rotating exhibitions.
- Theatre Art Galleries: Housed in the High Point Theatre since 1975, the Theatre Art Galleries (TAG) hosts exhibitions of contemporary visual art. TAG has been the sole independent nonprofit provider of the visual arts in High Point and includes one of the finest stage and gallery spaces in the Southeast.
- Truist Point: a multi-use stadium, home of the High Point Rockers in the Atlantic League of Professional Baseball and the Carolina Core FC in the MLS Next Pro.
- World's Largest Chest of Drawers: Built in 1926, the World's Largest Bureau started out half the size it was later, with most of its height coming from a mirror. It housed the Jaycees, the Chamber of Commerce and an antique store. The most recent owner was the Nido and Maria Qubein Children's Museum, which announced it was being sold in 2026. It is an example of automobile-oriented pop architecture and has been featured on numerous broadcasts such as MTV and The Travel Channel.
- Nido & Mariana Qubein Children’s Museum: Opening in 2022 this museum offers many kid-friendly exhibits including a double decker carousel, a steam lab, a hall of mysteries and an outdoor playground.

=== Historic places ===
Sites on the National Register of Historic Places

- John H. Adams House
- Deep River Friends Meeting House and Cemetery
- Enterprise Building
- First Baptist Church
- Dr. C. S. Grayson House
- Guilford County Office and Court Building
- John Haley House
- Hardee Apartments
- High Point Central High School
- Highland Cotton Mills Village Historic District
- Allen Jay School Rock Gymnasium
- Kilby Hotel
- O. Arthur Kirkman House and Outbuildings
- Model Farm
- Eli Moore House
- Oakwood Historic District
- William Penn High School
- Sherrod Park
- J. C. Siceloff House
- Spring Hill Methodist Protestant Church Cemetery
- Spurgeon House
- A. E. Taplin Apartment Building
- Tomlinson Chair Manufacturing Company Complex
- Uptown Suburbs Historic District
- Washington Street Historic District
- West High Street Historic District
- Lucy and J. Vassie Wilson House

== Education ==
=== K–12 education ===
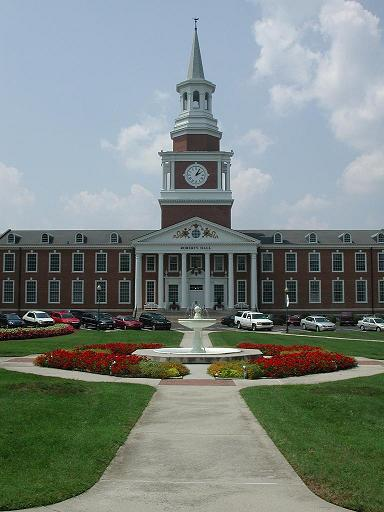
High Point University, Roberts Hall

The portions in Guilford County are in the Guilford County Schools school district, which covers the vast majority of the municipality.

Portions in Davidson, Forsyth, and Randolph counties are in the Davidson County Schools, Winston-Salem/Forsyth County Schools, and Randolph County School System school districts, respectively.

Private schools for children were established in and around High Point as early as the early nineteenth century by Quakers. The New York Yearly Meeting of the Society of Friends, a network of Quakers from that state, started a school in Asheboro in the 1880s for African American students. The school relocated to High Point in 1891 on land east of town on Washington Street. The institution was named the High Point Normal and Industrial School (later William Penn High School), and was administered by the Quakers until 1897. In that year, black educator Alfred J. Griffin accepted the position of principal and led the establishment into a long period of growth. The school closed in 1968, but was renovated and reopened in 2003 as Penn-Griffin School for the Arts, a public arts magnet high school. It is one of three public high schools in the city.

The High Point public school system was founded in 1897 with the approval of a $10,000 bond, in part to finance the purchase of J. Elwood Cox's family home on South Main Street for use as the first school building. Twelve school commissioners were appointed to administer the 350-student system of five grades. Growth of the city's institutions reflected improved primary educational facilities. A school building campaign coupled with additional grades and improved classes resulted in four additional schools for white students: Elm Street School (1905), Park Street School (1910), Fairview School (1910), and Grimes Street School (1911). Many other schools were born in the 1920s during a period of rapid growth.

This building spree culminated in 1927 with the opening of High Point High School. Among the many high styled school complexes in the state, few surpass High Point's grand 1927 high school. The campus joined the talents of two designers, Greensboro architect Harry Barton and Charlotte landscape architect Earl S. Draper. The building was matched in 1931 with the addition of Ferndale Middle School just to the east, designed to incorporate details from the high school so that it maintained a campus theme. Both shared athletic facilities on a large tract of land between downtown and Emerywood. In 1962, High Point High School's name was modified to High Point Central High School when an additional high school, T. Wingate Andrews High School, was established in the 1960s.

Several private and independent schools are found in High Point, including High Point Christian Academy (Baptist), High Point Friends School (Quaker), Immaculate Heart of Mary (Catholic), Wesleyan Christian Academy (Wesleyan), and Westchester Country Day School (nonsectarian), and Phoenix Academy, a charter school.

=== Colleges and universities ===
In 1921, the Chamber of Commerce made the establishment of a college in High Point a high priority and initiated a High Point College campaign. The campaign solicited funds in order to attract the attention of the North Carolina Methodist Protestants, who had desired for decades to found a college.

High Point succeeded in attracting the college over rivals Greensboro and Burlington with a gift of 60 acres (24 ha) and $100,000 in pledges from leading citizens. High Point College opened in 1924 (changed to High Point University in 1991) with three buildings at various stages of development. Many of the numerous civic organizations founded in the 1920s pledged funds, including the Rotary, Kiwanis, Civitan, and the American Business Club. The architectural design of the High Point College campus was in keeping with traditional and historical architectural initiatives found at many private colleges and universities across the state in the 1920s. The administration building (Roberts Hall), male and female dormitories (McCulloch Hall and Women's Hall, respectively), and a central heating plant were all erected between 1922 and 1924 according to designs by Washington, D.C. architect R. E. Mitchell with assistance by High Point architect Herbert Hunter. Today, High Point University is a four-year, coeducational, liberal arts university related to the United Methodist Church. It offers 50 majors in a traditional day format. It also offers non-traditional evening programs, and the graduate studies program offers 10 master's degrees and one doctorate degree.

High Point is one of the nine Shaw University "CAPE" (College of Adult and Professional Education) program centers. Guilford Technical Community College maintains a High Point campus.

Providence Bible College & Seminary (Baptist) operates in High Point, offering degrees from Bible Diploma to Doctorate Degree. High Point was also the home of John Wesley University (formerly called Laurel University and John Wesley College), which merged into Piedmont International University in Winston-Salem in 2018.

== Media ==
=== Newspapers ===
The High Point Enterprise, established in 1885, is the only daily newspaper published in High Point. HP Magazine is a full-color glossy lifestyle magazine that offers stories on food, history, events, the furniture industry, and more. The monthly magazine is the city's largest locally owned publication. Greensboro's News & Record is available in High Point. Triad City Beat, Yes! Weekly and Qué Pasa are free weekly papers covering High Point and the rest of the Triad area.

=== Television stations ===
High Point makes up part of the Greensboro/Winston-Salem/High Point television designated market area. These stations are listed by call letters, channel number, network and city of license.

- WFMY-TV, 2, CBS, Greensboro
- WGHP, 8, FOX, High Point
- WXII-TV, 12, NBC, Winston-Salem
- WGPX, 16, ION, Burlington
- WCWG, 20, CW, Lexington
- WUNL-TV, 26, PBS/UNCTV, Winston-Salem
- WLXI-TV, 43, TCT, Greensboro
- WXLV-TV, 45, ABC, Winston-Salem
- WMYV-TV, 48, MyNetworkTV, Greensboro

== Infrastructure ==
=== Transportation ===
Amtrak's Crescent, Carolinian and Piedmont trains connect High Point with the cities of New York, Philadelphia, Baltimore, Washington, Richmond, Raleigh, Charlotte, Atlanta, Birmingham and New Orleans. The recently refurbished historic High Point Amtrak station is at 100 West High Street.

The Piedmont Authority for Regional Transportation (PART) operates in High Point. It is a service that shuttles people among most of the cities in the northwestern Piedmont region of North Carolina. The main service for public transportation in High Point is Hi tran, the local bus service.

Highways inside and adjacent to High Point include:

- I-74
- I-85
- US 29
- US 70
- NC 62
- NC 68
- NC 610

== Notable people ==
- Alma Adams, politician
- Stefon Adams, former NFL cornerback
- Bam Adebayo, NBA player for the Miami Heat
- Luke Appling, baseball player for the Chicago White Sox, inducted into National Baseball Hall of Fame in 1964
- Tony Baker, former NFL running back
- Brandon Banks, NFL defensive lineman
- Aaron Wiggins, NBA player for the Atlanta Hawks
- Fantasia Barrino, Grammy Award-winning singer and season 3 winner of American Idol
- Ricco Barrino, singer and brother of Fantasia Barrino, American Idol, Grammy Award-winning singer
- Nimfasha Berchimas, soccer player
- Heather Bergsma, Olympic speed skater and bronze medalist at 2018 Winter Olympics
- Dave Blaney, NASCAR driver
- Ryan Blaney, NASCAR driver
- Cliff Bolton, MLB catcher
- Brandt Bronico, soccer player
- J. T. Brown, ice hockey player; son of Ted Brown
- Ted Brown, former Minnesota Vikings running back and College Football Hall of Fame inductee
- Dorothy R. Burnley, businesswoman and politician
- James H. Burnley IV, lawyer
- James P. Cain, United States Ambassador to Denmark
- Benny Carter, painter and sculptor
- Lawrence Chandler, composer, music producer, founder of Bowery Electric
- John Coltrane, jazz saxophonist, was born in Hamlet and moved to High Point shortly after birth, remained through high school
- Dick Culler, former MLB player
- Bill Davis, owner of Bill Davis Racing of NASCAR
- James Dickey, National Book Award-winning poet, author of Deliverance
- Johnny Evans, former NFL player for the Cleveland Browns
- Gary Fortune, former MLB player for the Philadelphia Phillies and Boston Red Sox
- Cindy Garner, actress and model
- Marcus Gilchrist, NFL safety
- Bryson Gray, rapper and music producer
- Anthony Dean Griffey, opera singer
- William Hayes, NFL defensive end
- J. D. Hayworth, former U.S. congressman representing Arizona
- Ray Hayworth, former MLB catcher
- Red Hayworth, former MLB player for the St. Louis Browns
- Elizabeth Horton, winner of the 2006 Miss North Carolina pageant
- Greg Jeffries, former NFL player for the Detroit Lions and Miami Dolphins
- Sammy Johnson, former NFL running back
- Cathy Johnston-Forbes, former professional golfer on the LPGA Tour
- Gene Jones, professional golfer
- Adam Lazzara, lead singer of Taking Back Sunday
- Jimmie Lewallen, NASCAR driver
- Jenn Lyon, actress
- Bob Margolin, blues guitarist
- Quincy Miller, NBA player
- Nadia Moffett, Miss North Carolina USA 2010
- Wil Myers, MLB player
- DJ Luke Nasty, rapper
- Jim Paschal, NASCAR driver
- Theo Pinson, NBA player
- Eddie Pope, soccer player
- Nido R. Qubein, president of High Point University, businessman and motivational speaker
- Harrison Rhodes, NASCAR driver
- Junior Robinson, former NFL cornerback
- Clyde Simms, soccer player
- Caleb Smith, freestyle and folkstyle wrestler
- Emily Spivey, television writer, producer and creator of the series Up All Night and Bless the Harts, the latter is based on her life growing up in Greensboro and High Point
- Perley A. Thomas, founder of Thomas Built Buses
- Maxwell Thurman, U.S. Army general who helped develop the longtime "Be All You Can Be" Army recruitment campaign
- Tony Washington, former NFL wide receiver
- Drew Weaver, professional golfer
- Brian Williams, former NFL cornerback
- Harry Williamson, Olympic middle-distance runner
- Adrian Wilson, former NFL safety
- Kevin Witt, former MLB player for the Toronto Blue Jays, San Diego Padres, Detroit Tigers, and Tampa Bay Rays
- John William Wofford, Olympic equestrian rider

== See also ==
- List of municipalities in North Carolina
- Piedmont Triad
- USS High Point (PCH-1)
