= D. H. Starbuck =

American lawyer & politician (1818–1887)

Darius Henry Starbuck (September 15, 1818 – May 26, 1887) was a North Carolina lawyer and political figure who served as United States Attorney for the entire state, and then for the Western District of North Carolina after the state was divided into two districts.

== Early life ==
D. H. Starbuck was born Darius Henry Starbuck in Guilford County, North Carolina, on September 15, 1818. He was the son of Reuben and Mary Beeson Starbuck. Reuben was born in Nantucket, Massachusetts, on November 4, 1787, the son of Gayer and Rachel Folger Starbuck. His mother was born in Guilford County on September 28, 1789, the daughter of Benjamin and Rachel Green Beeson. Both of his parents' were born into Quaker families. His parents married on February 12, 1812, in Guilford. Darius was one of eight siblings:

- Melinda Starbuck (1812–1846)
- Uriel Starbuck (1814–1844)
- Elihu Starbuck (1816–1889)
- Darius Henry Starbuck (1818–1887)
- Lewis Starbuck (1822–1877)
- Benjamin Beeson Starbuck (1827–1876)
- Thomas Clarkson Starbuck (1832–1906)
- Matilda Starbuck (1834–1844)

Darius's father, Reuben, worked as a farmer in Guilford County. Darius and his brothers worked on the family farm while growing up there. In 1820 and 1830 an elderly woman, aged between 80 and 89 in 1830, is living in the Starbuck household. This is likely to be Darius's paternal grandmother, Rachel Folger Starbuck, as she was widowed in 1814. A young man aged between 19 and 25 was also living in the family household in 1820, he was also working on the family farm at that time. The Starbucks were early members of the Dover Monthly Meeting, having appeared in the church's records within the first few months of services.

== Professional life ==
Starbuck graduated from New Garden College, before studying law under John Adams Gilmer. In 1840 he was admitted to the bar. After settling in Salem around 1849, he soon took to his law practice in Forsyth.

Following the secession of South Carolina from the Union on December 20, 1860, citizens of Forsyth County were reported in local newspapers as having sparred over the subject of the possibility of the future secession of North Carolina. The county's Whig newspaper, The People's Press, is cited as having advised its readers to "watch their tongues" in response to the recent outbreak of quarreling. A public meeting was arranged to be held at the Winston courthouse on December 29 to discuss this issue. In 1860, Forsyth had a population of 12,692, of that population an estimated 800 citizens attended the meeting that day, roughly 16% of the total population. R. L. Patterson, who was asked to serve as chairman of the meeting, said that the event was held for members of the community to "counsel together" — "and to see if there was not some common ground on which all [local] parties could unite in the present crisis." D. H. Starbuck was one of five men who addressed the meeting. It was Starbuck's motion that the chairman appoint a committee of fifteen gentlemen to draft resolutions on how the meeting should act. Starbuck was among the men appointed to the committee. Rufus Watson Wharton with whom Starbuck had previously shared a residence in 1850, was also among them. Other notable members included lawyer and editor of The Western Sentinel Col. John Wesley Alspaugh, Dr. Beverly Jones, Dr. T. F. Keehln, Col. Joseph Masten, lawyer John Watson, and Judge Thomas J. Wilson. After two hours the committee returned with eleven resolutions. These resolutions consisted largely of rhetoric that was being argued throughout the country already. Notably, one of these resolutions proposed levying high tariffs on states which did not cooperate with the return of fugitive slaves. The fourth resolution stated "that waiving the Constitutional question of the power of a State to secede from the Union, such act of secession, if effected peaceably, is not an appropriate and adequate remedy for the injuries under which the Southern States are now laboring. To depart from the Union, leaving behind in the hands of her supposed enemies, all her accumulations of eighty years, in which she had proportional rights, would be a sacrifice on the part of a State, except under pressure of overruling necessity, as incompatible with her dignity as her interests.” The eleventh resolution called for the publication of these resolutions in all local newspapers, and that copies of these resolutions should be sent to the General Assembly and Congress.

It was reported that all fifteen committee members voted unanimously in favor of the resolutions. The choice to vote unanimously was likely an influence of the Quaker teaching of Consensus decision-making, due to the community's religious heritage. To attest to the political attitudes shared among members of both political parties in Forsyth after the court house meeting, both The People's Press and the county's Democratic newspaper, The Western Sentinel, agreed that North Carolina should not secede from the Union. The People's Press ran a headline on the meeting stating, "Secession has no abiding place in Forsyth." The Western Sentinel concluded its report of the events more cautiously with the statement "Union if we can, otherwise its alternative." The third resolution was to select members of the community to be sent to the state constitutional convention of 1861. Starbuck, as well as Rufus Watson Wharton, were among the men selected to serve as delegates from Forsyth County to the conventions. Starbuck was also a representative of the 1865 state convention which brought North Carolina back into the union.

=== U.S. Attorney ===
Starbuck was first appointed to the U.S. Attorney's post for the state of North Carolina on December 20, 1865, by President Andrew Johnson. In the general election of 1868, he was elected State Superior Court Judge of North Carolina's Eight Judicial District, but declined the office in hopes of continuing as U.S. Attorney under the new administration of Ulysses S. Grant. His choice to decline the position was likely made due to his religious beliefs as a Quaker. American Quakers believe, “Liberty of conscience being ... essential to the well‐being of religious societies, we ... therefore advise and exhort all in profession with us, to decline the acceptance of any office or station in civil government, the duties of which are inconsistent with our religious principles.” In January 1869, president Grant received letters of recommendation for Starbuck's reappointment. Governor William W. Holden wrote in his letter of recommendation, which was co-signed by 8 other people, "Mr. Starbuck — by his learning, diligence and devotion to the interests of the government, has given general satisfaction. We believe the interests of the government and the welfare of society would be subserved by his continuance in the office, while his re-appointment would be a just recognition of the services of an officer who has performed his duties with more than ordinary ability and fidelity." U.S. District Judge George W. Brooks, at the time judge of the same court where Starbuck served as District Attorney, wrote in his letter of recommendation, "Mr. Starbuck was one of the very small number of citizens of prominence in that part of North Carolina, that remained under the control of the rebels after the first year of the rebellion — who adhered to the Union. Before the rebellion his efforts were against that movement — during the existence of the rebellion his efforts were — directed toward the restoration of the authority of the federal government — And since that authority has been restored — he has been an earnest advocate of the reconstruction measures of Congress." Judge Thomas Settle, who at the time was serving as the newly elected Associate Justice of the Supreme Court of North Carolina, wrote, "Allow me to recommend D. H. Starbuck, as District Attorney for North Carolina. He was appointed to this position, upon the reorganization of the Courts in this state; and has discharged its duties to the satisfaction of the good people of the State. He rendered zealous and efficient aid in reconstructing the State upon its present basis. In the general election of April 1868, he was chosen as one of our Superior Court Judges, but declined that position for the place he now occupies. The [Grant] administration has no warmer friend than Judge Starbuck, and his reappointment would give general satisfaction to our people." Grant eventually did reappoint Starbuck in 1870. When it was decided that the North Carolina District Court should be divided into eastern and western districts, President Grant received a letter of recommendation from David L. Bringle, recommending Starbuck to be replaced on the newley created court by lawyer William H. Bailey. This recommendation, however, fell on deaf ears, as in 1872 Grant appointed Starbuck as the first U.S. attorney for the western district, while his old post in Raleigh, now the eastern district, went to Richard C. Badger. In 1876 Starbuck was replaced in the western district by Virgil S. Lusk.

==== North Carolina Ku Klux Klan Trials ====
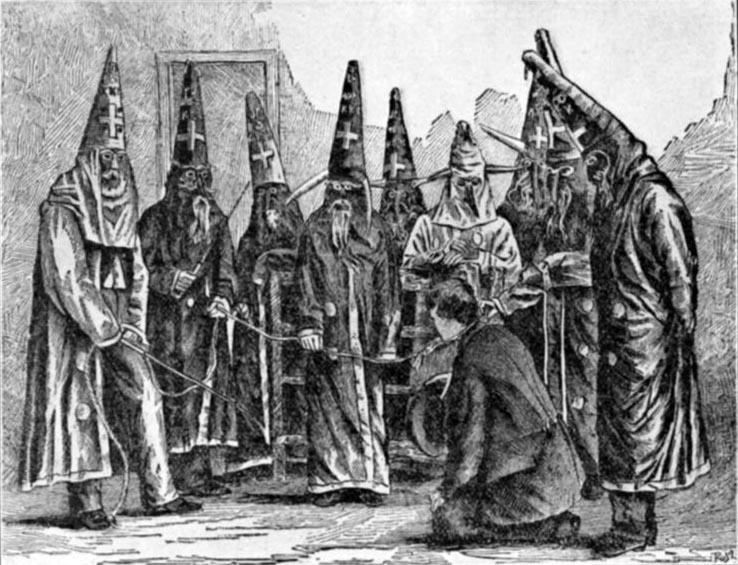
Engraving of Ku Klux Klansmen in North Carolina in 1870, based on a photograph

In the aftermath of the Kirk–Holden war and following the passage of the Ku Klux Klan Act in April 1871, which suspended the writ of habeas corpus to combat the Klan, Solicitor General Benjamin Bristow wrote to Starbuck on June 6 of that year, bringing to his attention Klan activities in “Rutherford and adjacent counties.” A mob of around 50 Klansmen had abducted and brutalized J. M. Justice, a local Republican lawmaker who was then scheduled to testify against members of the Klan. Superior Court Judge G. W. Logan had to call upon Governor Caldwell requesting military protection after he had received death threats from the Klan. President Grant sent about sixty-five Union Cavalrymen into the county for support. Judge Logan issued warrants for the arrests of the offending Klansmen. Solicitor General Bristow instructed Starbuck to perform a “prompt and diligent investigation of all these cases, and vigorous prosecution of the guilty parties,” asking him to “bring the supposed offenders to a speedy trial.” Conscience of the strength the Klan held in the state, Starbuck wrote to then Attorney General Amos T. Akerman over his fears that the trials would end with acquittals. He wrote in the letter, “We have to contest against a terrible combination of men bent upon the acquittal of these men. Should we fail in this, then I fear freedom of speech, of election, of civil liberty itself, in this state is gone.” He asked that the federal government provide “corresponding [military] efforts…to thwart their settled purposes” if the trials were unsuccessful. Judge George Washington Brooks and Judge Hugh Lennox Bond would preside over the trials. Judge Brooks had previously rendered verdicts which had weakened the usage of the Fourteenth Amendment and sided with Klansmen. A Charlotte Democratic newspaper wrote of the judge's involvement in the cases to say they were “prepared to find in Judge Brooks an honest Judge who would give, as far as lay in his power, a fair trial to the alleged [Klansmen].” It is important, however, to note that Brooks had previously written a letter of recommendation to president Grant on behalf of Starbuck's appointment as district attorney after Starbuck abdicated his elected role as Judge over the same court Judge Brooks would subsequently presided over. Judge Bond was a Republican, who was “determined to put down [the] outrages” of the Klan, Starbuck stated himself. Judge Bond had previously dismissed a case brought forth by “Ku Klux lawyers” against a Union Colonel for “assault and battery and false imprisonment.” Starbuck wrote that he was cautiously optimistic Bond's presence would help to mitigate Judge Brooks's influence over the proceedings.

Starbuck had initially formed a more ambitious plan for indictments which would have challenged Judge Brooks's previous verdicts on the Fourteenth Amendment. Fearing acquittal if he challenged Judge Brooks on this issue, Starbuck altered his approach for indicting Klansmen in the state and formed a new plan focused solely around the Ku Klux Klan Act. His new plan was to prove that the "outrages were committed to intimidate the victims to the abandonment of their Republican and Union principles" and interfere with the "freedom of elections." Starbuck was under constant pressure from Bristow to prosecute the cases "with vigor and energy to final judgement." On day one of the trial the defense attempted to have two out of the three counts as laid forth by Starbuck against the Klansmen thrown-out due to "vagueness." Judge Bond overruled the motion. The defense tried to question the constitutionality of the charges, but they failed in these efforts as well. Judge Brooks defied public expectations and broke with his previous rulings, calling the Klan "the most damning blot upon the character of [North Carolina] the history records." Brooks went on to rule the jury was legally summoned and rejected appeals for mercy in his sentencing. Attorney General Akerman personally attended many of the North Carolina trials, using his presence to apply pressure on prosecutors and judges for maximum sentencing. Ultimately Starbuck's strategy to use only the Ku Klux Klan Act was successful, and he convinced the grand jury to indict fifty-six Klansmen by June 1871. Forty-nine of those indicted went on to be successfully convicted over three trials. Starbuck held a 75% conviction rate for his Klan related cases in 1871. These decisions by the grand jury made Starbuck the first federal prosecutor to successfully try a case which upheld The Ku Klux Klan Act in a Federal court in the United States, and the most successful person to ever try members of the Klan by statistics. Starbuck wrote a letter to Attorney General Akerman on the success of his Ku Klux Klan Act focused strategy: "It was a new law which had never before received judicial construction and we were without any precedent for any form of indictment. We have not only convicted those who did the deed of scourging, but we have convicted 16 who were proved only as members of the order of the “Invisible Empire.” On behalf of the prosecution we insisted & was sustained by the event that the purpose of this order was proven to be, to destroy the freedom of election by intimidation that all who became member of the order thereby became joint conspirators in the one common unlawful purpose & were alike guilty. This was a great point gained, on which makes any member of the Clan liable to punishment and is the blow which I think will suppress the organization." Gracious for his early victories, Starbuck felt entitled "to the gratitude and thanks of the law abiding people everywhere and especially of the Republican or Union Party of the nation which it was the purpose of this daring conspiracy to destroy.”

Bristow continued urging Starbuck to pursue judgments of all cases that were ready, and to prioritize cases involving Klansmen with "[higher] social standing and character" so as to make public examples of them and help to demoralize resistance to reconstruction efforts in the region. Randolph Shotwell is a notable example of the type of prominent Klansmen targeted by the trials. Shotwell was owner to many failed Democratic Party newspapers, including one in Rutherford county, a former Confederate soldier, and a member of the state legislature for a time. J. M. Justice identified Shotwell as one of the Klansmen who had attacked him. He was given a sentencing of six years hard labor in a federal penitentiary and fined $5,000, the harshest punishment given to any convicted Klansmen in the trials. President Grant, however, offered clemency to those convicted in return for information that could lead to the arrests of other Klansmen. Shotwell was among the men who were pardoned in this deal by the president, though he did serve two years in prison before receiving commutation of his sentencing. Shotwell began speaking publicly, asking fellow Klansman to confess so that they could be pardoned by the Grant administration. Amidst this, Republican Party officials were also inundating Starbuck's office with letters reporting Klan activity across the state. Senator Pool wrote to Virgil S. Lusk in October, then working as Starbuck's Assistant U.S. Attorney, demanding the District Attorney's office investigate “a number of outrages recently committed in Sampson County.” Even former Governor Holden wrote to Starbuck in November, giving him information about a group of Klansmen in the state, telling Starbuck to “make inquiry” and “promptly prosecute.” Subsequently, the court was quickly overwhelmed with new cases. The grand jury would indict 493 Klansmen that year. The grand jury was issuing so many arrest warrants resulting from this wave of information that by the Autumn of 1871 the Klan was regarded to have collapsed in South-Western North Carolina. Amidst this growing caseload, Judge Bond was forced to announce that there was no more room in the docket for him to take up new cases in North Carolina, as he had to return to his usual circuit court. Starbuck wrote to Governor Caldwell, asking him to "make the prosecuting officers of the state courts" continue with trials and "attack upon the routed and scattered hosts of the K Klux." Despite Starbuck's hopes that the Klan would "be forever suppressed in [North Carolina]," the Klan resumed activities in the state within a year of the cases being brought to a halt. While Starbuck directly refuted his claims, by March 1872 Judge Logan, reported his district was "still infested" with Klansmen.

Office United States Attorney,

Salem, North Carolina, February 24, 1872.

These indictments are for conspiracies to commit deeds of violence or terror, to deter and drive from the ballot-box Union men, and to destroy the freedom of elections, to enable the enemies of the Union, through their secret, oath-bound, midnight organizations, to obtain (without open revolt) as complete and effectual control over the State as they maintained by open warfare during the rebellion.

The evidence in these cases discloses the horrid facts of the tearing of fathers, sons, and brothers from the bosom of their families at the hour of midnight, and the infliction upon their naked flesh of the torture and the lash, the brutal exposure of helpless females, and, occasionally, the commission of murder by bands of disguised men to make their intimidations the more emphatic.

Indeed, every means which the most fertile imagination of these fiendish monsters and enemies of the Union could invent have been resorted to to inspire the Unionists with fear and terror, and to destroy their freedom of thought, action, and manhood.

Had it not been for the passage of said acts of Congress and the active enforcement of them the spirit of treason would to-day revel in high carnival over the entire South, and effectually crush out and overawe the Union sentiment of the southern country, as it did in the days of the rebel government.

But the conviction of a number of these persons, and their punishment, and the indictment of this large number of others, together with the exercise by the President of the right to suspend the writ of habeas corpus in such localities where treason has usurped such dominion as to render the civil authorities powerless or insufficient to enforce the law, seem for the present to have broken the power of this widespread conspiracy against the friends of the Union in the South. Yet the utmost vigilance in the rigid enforcement of these acts of Congress is and will be necessary to suppress the spirit of treason lurking in the hearts of the disaffected and treacherous enemies of the Government, and to preserve the freedom of the citizen in the full and free exercise and enjoyment of the elective franchise and the rights and immunities of citizenship.

I am, very respectfully, yours, &c.,

D. H. STARBUCK.

District Attorney for North Carolina.

Senator Daniel D. Pratt of Indiana, in his arguments to extend The Ku Klux Klan Act on May 17, 1872, submitted letters before congress as a part of his remarks. One of these letters, written April 19, 1872, was from Attorney General Geo. H. Williams, who had replaced Akerman in December. Williams reported in the letter that Starbuck had successfully found indictments for 944 individuals under the Ku Klux Klan Act by that date. Also submitted was an emotionally stirring letter from Starbuck himself. Along with the Senator's speech, it would go on to be published and circulated through political pamphlets throughout the country to help garner support for the extension of the act. By 1973, Despite national efforts to extend the Ku Klun Klan Act and Starbuck's petitioning of government officials, with mounting caseloads backlogged in the court system, high legal and military costs, and pressures from within the court, Starbuck had to enter all remaining indicted cases nol pros (will not prosecute).

D. T. Corbin would go on to use legal precedents established by Starbuck to help with his efforts in prosecuting the Klan in South Carolina. Corbin's efforts in the neighboring state were dramatically less successful statistically, although Corbin did see many more cases to completion than Starbuck. For 1871, in all cases brought forth to the court by Corbin, his rate of success in cases that ended in conviction was only 48%, compared to Starbuck's 75% conviction rate that same year. Corbin's lower conviction rate was the result of much harder push-back within the state at all political levels. Also, the weakness of Starbuck's strategy to only pursue indictments for crimes laid out in the Ku Klux Klan Act was that it left open disputes over whether the Fourteenth Amendment could be legally upheld in court. Corbin pushed back on the decisions of Judge Brooks and went on to be the first Federal Prosecutor to successfully try a case with a judgement to uphold the Fourteenth Amendment.

=== Political activity ===
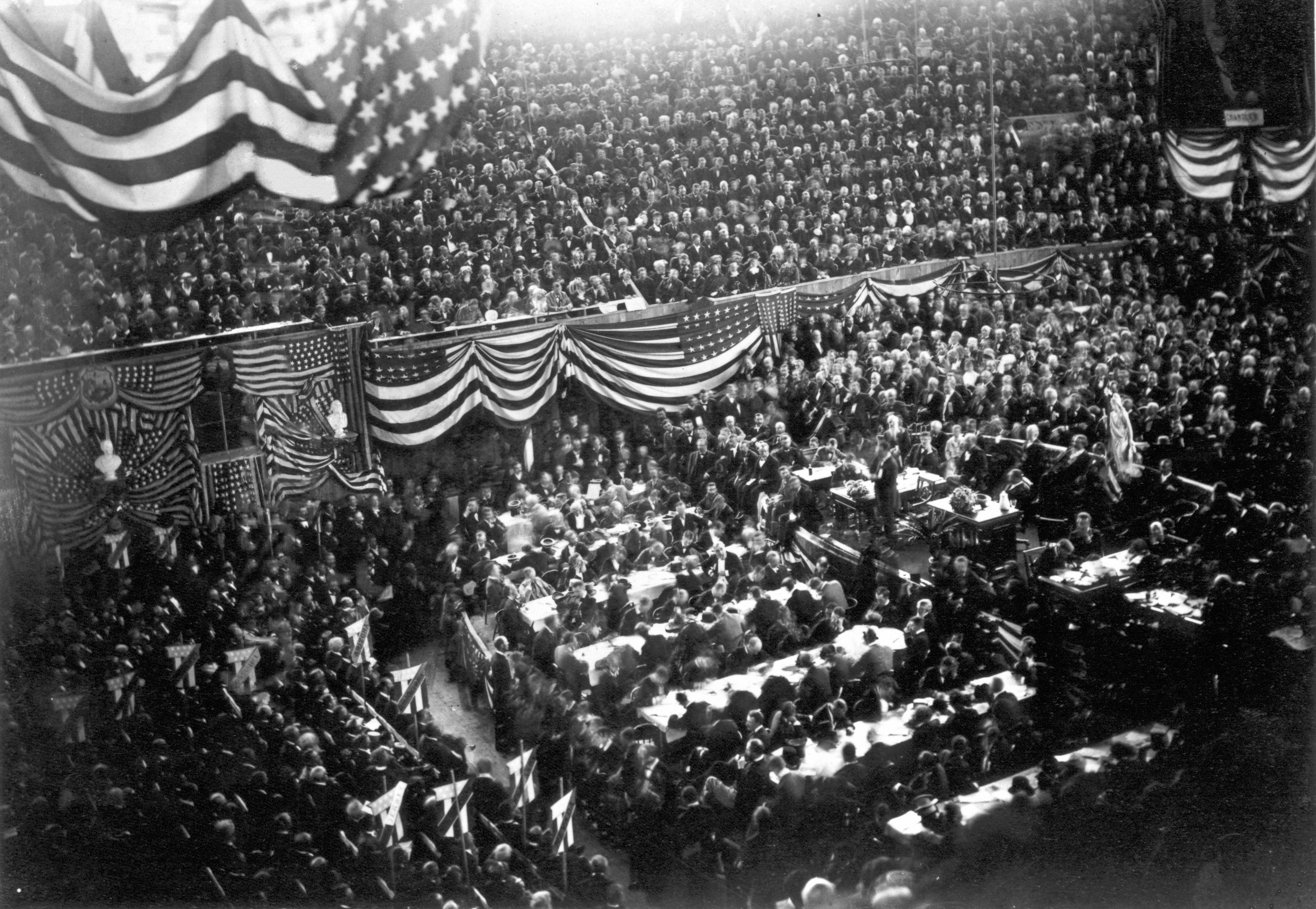
View of the floor of the 1880 Republican National Convention in Chicago, Illinois, to which Starbuck was a delegate

In 1880, Starbuck was one of ten men appointed to a committee to select Republican delegates from the state of North Carolina to vote in the 1880 National Convention. The other nine members of the committee were lawyer and Collector of the Port of Wilmington W. P. Cannady, former District 1 State Senator from Pasquotank County C. W. Grandy, D. A. Jenkins, James H. Harris, Orlando Hubbs, Col. Lott Williams Humphreys, the state Collector of Internal Revenue Dr. John James Mott, former District 7 Collector Pinkney Rollins, who was at the time of his committee appointment a Clerk in the Loans Division of the Treasury Department, and the committee's chairman Col. Thomas B. Keogh. Before the committee first met on January 29, 1880, it was believed that all members of the committee were supporters of president Grant, with the exception of Cannady, who was widely known to be a fervent supporter of Secretary Sherman. However, by the day of the committee meeting, when delegates would be elected, 5 new members had shifted their allegiances to Sherman. Among those five, were Darius Starbuck, along with Grandy, Harris, Mott, and Rollins. It was revealed, according to a nationally syndicated newspaper account which ran in The New York Times, that Cannady, after having been privy to a personal conference with Sherman, had agreed to secure other committee members' loyalties by promising favors and government office appointments. If a majority of committee members sided with Sherman, the delegate selection could be packed with Sherman supporters. According to the article, originally published in a Raleigh newspaper on February 3, "Cannady, casting around for the next capture, fixed his eye upon D. H. Starbuck, of Winston." — "[He] has been in very comfortable worldly circumstances ever since [his time as US Attorney], for such an office can be made profitable." — "It was not known that Starbuck still had any hard feelings about [Grant's choice not to reappoint Starbuck as US Attorney], but Cannady knew his man. To [Starbuck] was sent [former] Senator Joseph C. Abbott, now a Special Agent of the Treasury at $6 per day, with duties to secure Sherman delegates. Abbott approached Starbuck on the sore side of the lost District Attorneyship; he vividly portrayed to him his injuries in being so unjustly displaced, and insinuated that it would be the easiest thing in the world to get back again, especially as the term of Mr. Lusk, the present United States District Attorney, expired in May next. All he had to do was come out for Sherman. Starbuck came out." The author went on to write that two days before the committee was to meet, "[Starbuck] declared his conviction that the interests of [himself] and the Republican Party demanded the election of Sherman delegates to the National Convention — Mr. Starbuck to be one of them." To be stated more clearly, Starbuck chose to nominate himself as one of his state's delegates at the Republican National Convention. In a follow-up to that report, first published on March 10, it was said that, "There [had] been so much disgust at the action of the State Committee on the 29th of January, that it is now asserted that Messrs. J. H. Harris and D. H. Starbuck have recanted and are for Grant. The pressure may become so great that they will properly represent the sentiment of the party at Chicago, but their action cannot be foretold." It was also reported at this time that a new appointment deal had been struck with Starbuck in the event of a presidential win for Sherman. Gen. Rufus Barringer was to have been given the appointment of US Attorney for the Western District, though the choice to remove Lusk from his post had not yet been definitively decided, as Lusk had recently declared support for Sherman. Even so, the likelihood of Barringer's appointment was still considered to be "probable", as Lusk had "been compelled in the execution of his office to make himself very unpopular, and [had] no influence in his district." Now, "Starbuck stipulated that if Sherman succeeded, he [Starbuck] should succeed Dr. W. H. Wheeler as the Collector of the Fifth District." This decision was made because of Wheeler's allegiance to Grant. John Sherman did not become president, nor did he win his party's nomination. Starbuck was never appointed as District 5 Collector.

In the years following Starbuck's fade from political life, he returned to his law practice in Forsyth. He was mentioned by name in the biography of John Cameron Buxton. In it, it is said that by the time of Buxton's arrival in Winston around 1875, "Watson and [William B.] Glenn" — "[with] Colonel Joseph Masten, and Judges [Thomas] J. Wilson and D. H. Starbuck had the entire [law] practice of Forsythe County." It goes on to say that Masten, Wilson, and Starbuck soon thereafter "retired on account of age", creating a void in the city's law practice which Buxton was able to, in part, help fill.

== Personal life ==
=== 1840–1848: Young adulthood ===
When Starbuck was about 21, all of his siblings were counted in the household of their father in Guilford County in 1840. Starbuck's mother died on July 17 of that year at the age of 50. She was buried in the Dover Friends Meeting Church Cemetery in Colfax, where the family attended meetings. Uriel, Starbuck's oldest brother, was disowned in the Dover Friends Meeting Church records on May 27, 1841. Following his brother's dismissal, Darius himself was disowned from the Quaker church on March 30, 1843. Starbuck's father, Reuben, remarried some time after 1845 and before 1850. Reuben's second wife was Rachel Trueblood Stanley. Her birth was recorded on November 21, 1809, in Guilford County, the daughter of Isaac and Mary Outland Trueblood. Rachel's first husband, Jesse Stanley, died around 1845. Before his death the couple had at least two sons, Jesse Stanly Jr., and James H. Stanley. Both of Jesse Jr. and James would go on to spend the remainder of their youths in the household(s) of Reuben Starbuck. Both step-sons received properties in the divisions of Reuben's estate, James having been given the Endsley-Morgan House, one of many properties owned by Reuben.

=== 1849–1855: Move to Winston-Salem ===
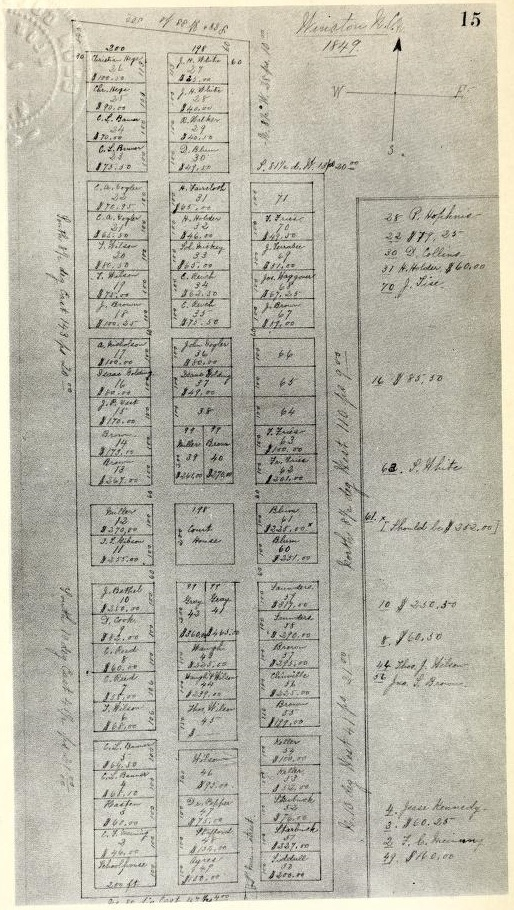
1849 street plan of Winston showing the two lots first purchased by Starbuck.

Starbuck is believed to have moved to Winston-Salem around 1849. Modern accounts purport that around this time he purchased three lots (lots 50, 51, and 52) from the Salem Moravian Church for $503 (~$15,374 in 2025) during one of the earliest land auctions in Winston. Near the corner of Main and First Streets, the property fronted 300 feet on Main Street. Church records, however, say that Darius purchased lots 51 and 52 for $327 and $76, totaling $403; lot 50 was originally purchased by a Mr. Cecil. Nevertheless, Starbuck acquired lot 50 at some point during this early period in Winston's history. Today these three lots are at 101 North Main Street, the site of the current Winston-Salem City Hall, and across the street from the Wells Fargo Center. Starbuck's associate Thomas J. Wilson also purchased lots during these early land auctions.

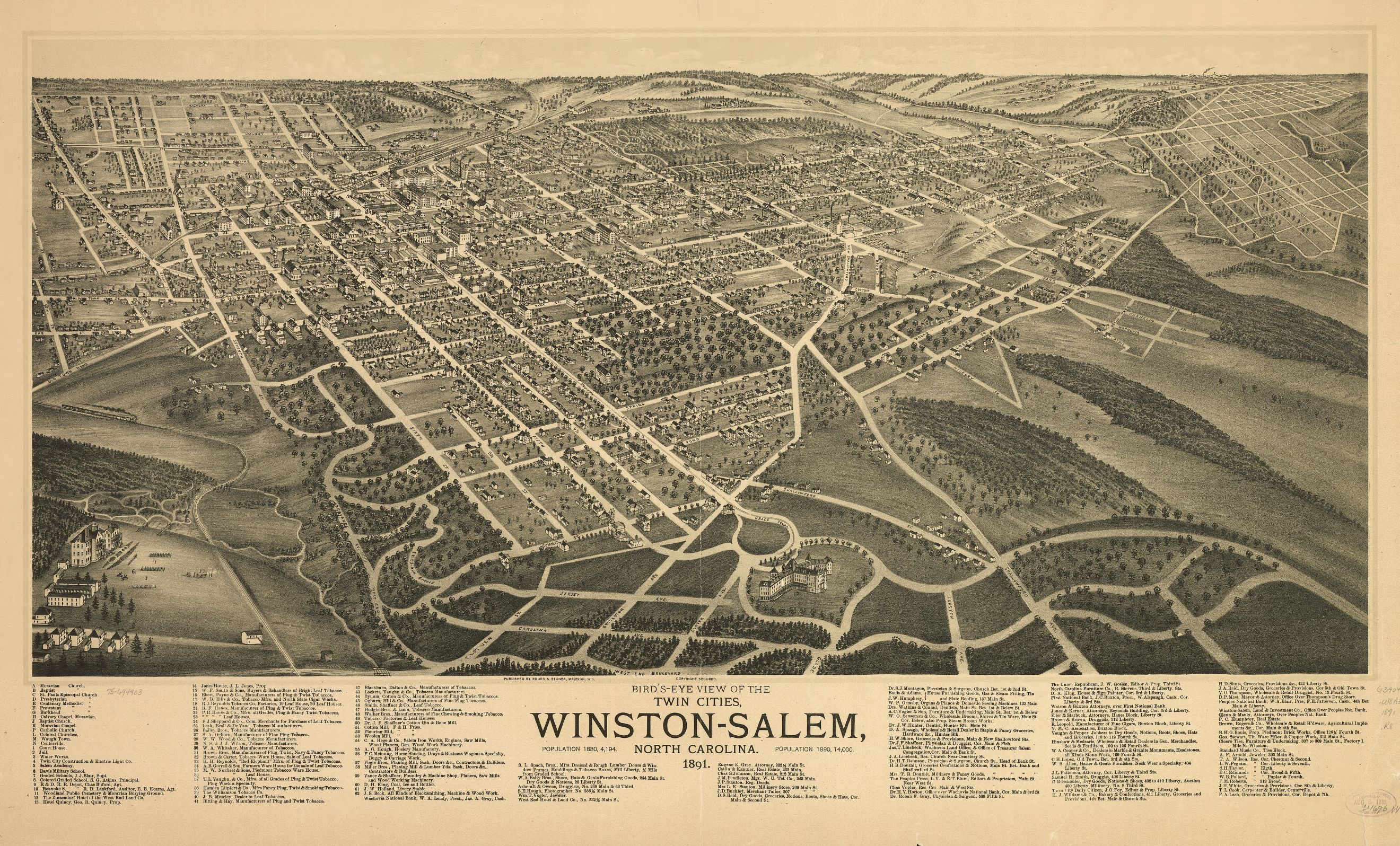
1891 Bird's eye view of the corner of Main and First Streets in Winston-Salem. Starbuck's two-story home can be seen prominently.

On the three lots acquired in 1849, Starbuck completed the construction of his home in Winston in 1851. Standing amidst a grove of trees, the Starbuck home was a colonial-style brick mansion. Described by all accounts as "beautiful", the Starbuck mansion was one of the first palatial homes in Winston. The editor of the Salem newspaper, the People's Press, wrote in 1852, "An occasional walk to our adjoining neighbor Winston never fails to impress us with the growing importance of the place." — "New and tasty buildings have been erected in 1851 and others are in progress. The citizens of Winston mostly display that neatness in the erection of their dwellings which strikes the beholder."

Starbuck, now age 30, appears in the 1850 Census living at the residence of landlord Adam Butner. Along with Butner's wife and seven children, Augustus Staub (a farmer from Prussia) and Rufus Watson Wharton (a lawyer from Beaufort County) are also listed as residents in the home. According to the Slave Schedule of that year, Darius owned one male slave, aged 37 years. Starbuck's older brother Elihu was disowned by the Quaker church on August 29 of this census year. Sometime after the 1850 census and before a special state census which was conducted on July 22, 1852, Darius's younger brother Benjamin moved to Warren County, Iowa. Darius was about 32 years old at the time of his brother's departure to the west. At least one letter survives that attests Darius maintained contact with Benjamin after the move. On October 23, 1854, the Aufseher Collegium of the Salem Moravian community refused an application by a married member of the church, William Shore, to purchase "a lot behind that of Mr. Starbuck, east of Winston, to build a house."

=== 1856–1868: Marriage and family ===
Ellen Blickensderfer was born on February 14, 1834, in Lititz, Pennsylvania. She was the daughter of Capt. Henry Blickenderfer (1808 - 1896) and Elvina Lucinda Beitel (1812 - 1904). Mr. and Mrs. Blickenderfer were both born into Moravian communities in Lititz and Nazareth, Pennsylvania, respectively. Mr. Blickenderfer began a lifelong occupation in cigar and snuff trading in Lititz in 1830, and worked as a hotelkeeper in at least three hotels between 1848 and 1865. During the term of Governor George Wolf he was "commissioned as a captain of a volunteer company in Lititz and commanded it for seven years." As a "staunch Democrat" who "voted for every Democratic candidate from the time of Andrew Jackson to that of Winfield S. Hancock", he served as a member of numerous city councils, as a tax collector, and in various lesser offices. Blickenderfer was also a prominent member of the Free Masons, Odd Fellows, Red Men, and Knights Templar. He was the treasurer of the Knights Templar's Lancaster Commandry No. 13, and at the time of his death was the oldest living member of the Red Men in Lancaster, having joined in 1858. Ellen moved to the Moravian settlement in Salem in 1844, aged about ten at the time of her arrival. Soon thereafter Ellen was adopted by Dr. Friedrich Heinrich Schumann (Frederick Henry Shuman) and his second wife Theodora Schultz Schumann (Shuman). As stated in Moravian church records, on June 4, 1844, "Dr. Schumann has adopted the girl Ellen Blickensdoerfer from Lititz." Only two months prior, a 16-year-old girl by the name of Amelia Marshall, who worked for Dr. Schumann, died unexpectedly on March 12. In 1847, at about age 13, Ellen joined the Salem choir of older girls. Ellen, at about 17 years of age, requested to "go to Pennsylvania for an extended visit" on February 26, 1851. Evidently, her request was granted as the Personalia of the Congregation in Salem For the Year 1851 lists that she was confirmed by the church and "admitted to the choir of the single sisters" while away on a visit to Lititz. A year later, then about 18 years old, Ellen entered the girl's boarding school in Salem.

On September 26, 1855, "the single Sr. Ellen Blickensderfer", about 21 years old, took another trip home to Pennsylvania. While there she married Darius Starbuck on January 1, 1856, in Lancaster County, Pennsylvania. Their wedding announcement ran in the Raleigh Register on January 23, 1856. Upon the newly wedded couple's return to Winston-Salem, the Salem Collegium made a decision to allow Ellen to remain a member of the church despite her choice to marry outside the Moravian faith. The couple's first child, Mary Theodora Starbuck (nicknamed Dora), was born October 14, 1856, and baptized by the Moravian church on December 12. Their second daughter, Ella R. Starbuck, was born July 25, 1859, and baptized on August 7. Around this time, Darius's youngest brother, Thomas Clarkson, was disowned from the Quaker meeting in Colfax on May 29, 1858.

At the time of the 1860 Census Darius (41) and Ellen (25) were officially living in Salem, although their home's location in Winston, on the border with Salem, may have led to confusion with the census taker. They were living with their two daughters, Mary S. (4) and Ella (1). In 1860 Darius's real estate was valued at $3,400, and his personal estate at $8,000. At this time he was working as a lawyer. On August 20, 1866, Darius purchased lot 111 from the Moravian church for $89.55. Darius and Ellen's third child, and only son, Henry Reuben Starbuck, was born September 23, 1866, and baptized on August 15.

Children with Ellen Blickensderfer

1. Mary Theodora "Dora" Starbuck Ebert
  - Birth: October 14, 1856, in Winston, Forsyth, NC, US
  - Death: February 29, 1924, in Old Richmond, Forsyth, NC, US
2. Ella R. Starbuck Montague
  - Birth: July 25, 1859, in Winston, Forsyth, NC, US
  - Death: January 7, 1910, in Winston, Forsyth, NC, US
3. Henry Reuben Starbuck Sr.
  - Birth: September 23, 1866, in Winston, Forsyth, NC, US
  - Death: June 21, 1958, in Winston-Salem, Forsyth, NC, US

=== 1869–1887: Final years ===
During Reconstruction in 1869, the "twin cities" of Salem and Winston conducted a census to evaluate the post-civil war population of the cities. It was found that "Winston had a population of 406, while Salem had 905". — "The white families in Winston numbered 71 and colored 26." The family of D. H. Starbuck was named in the census.

At the time of the 1870 Census Darius (51) was living with his wife Ellen (36) and three children—Mary T. (13), Ellen (11), and Henry R. (3). At this time his real estate was valued at $18,800 and his personal estate at $7,100. Darius was working as a U.S. District Attorney at this time. His daughters, Dora and Ella, were attending school at this time at the Salem Female Academy. Also living in the household in 1870 were a young girl named Anna Hege (7), a domestic servant named James Fulk (19), and brother-in-law Jacob Blickenderfer (25). This Anna Hege may have been Anna Trimella Hege Butner, the daughter of George W. and Harriet Rebecca Hege. A published genealogy of the Blickensderfer family was being compiled around this time, in it Ellen and Darius were listed as parents to one son and three daughters. While Ellen's 1900 census entree would suggest that she never gave birth to more than 3 biological children, this genealogy together with the 1870 census may suggest that the couple informally adopted Anna Hege at some point during reconstruction. Ellen's brother, Jacob, was working as a paymaster on the railroad in 1870. Other records show that Jacob ran a Notions Store in Salem.

Late in life, at the age of 53 and after 15 years of marriage, Darius chose to join his wife's faith. He was baptized by the Moravian church on March 24, 1872. The only entree in the Moravian church diaries to refer to Darius as a "brother" of the church is after this date, when on January 26, 1874, the Salem Collegium denied his request to purchase lands "east of the [railroad] by the acre." Later that year, however, on August 14, 1874, Darius purchased three lots. The first having 9 acres and 153 rods, the second having 17 acres and 24.5 rods, and the third having 7 acres and 42 rods, he purchased them from the church for $859.20. A year prior, on February 14, 1873, during a rowdy benefit for the Salem reading club which started around 7 p.m., a Mr. and Mrs. O. (members of the church) "took tea and spent the evening at Mr. Starbuck's" home. On December 20 of that year, Starbuck was either elected or re-elected as Noble Grand of the local Odd Fellows Lodge - Salem Lodge No.36. It was reported by the People's Press on March 26, 1874, that "Mr. Starbuck has a fine display of Geraniums, Lilies, [and] Japonicas." The very next day (March 27), a Mr. D. Bailey purchased 7 acres from the church for $175, but deeded this property to Starbuck. The People's Press ran a lengthy article on May 7, 1874, concerning Starbuck's brother-in-law Jacob Blickenderfer's involvement in an attempted robbery. The article also mentions local architect Elias Alexander Vogler, A. Vogler, and "Henry Edwards from Greensboro".

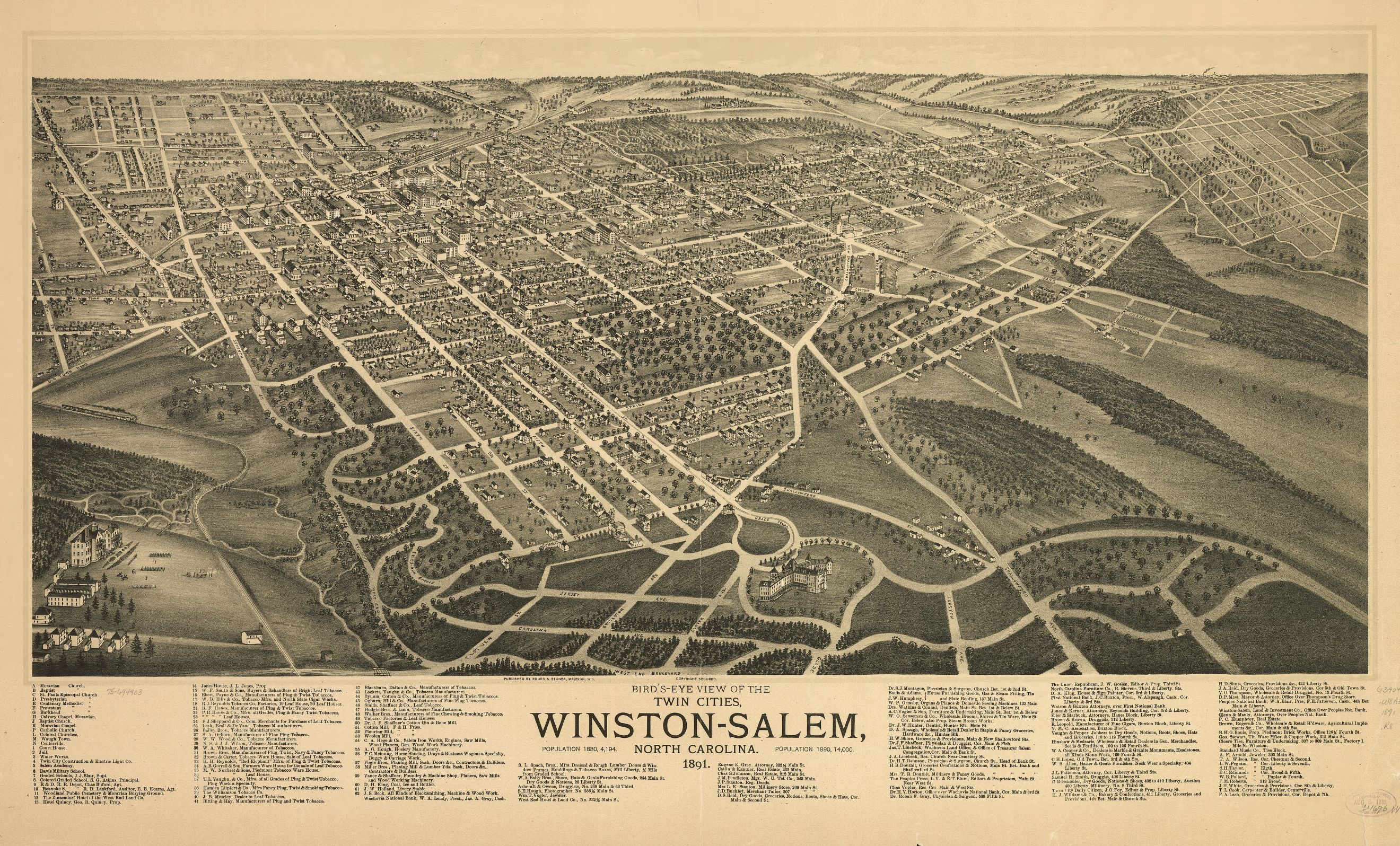
This 1891 map of Winston-Salem includes Dr. Seth Jones Montague's physician and surgeon's office in its business directory.

Starbuck's brother-in-law, Jacob Bickenderfer, married his first wife Adelia Cornelia Ackerman, daughter of Alex and Serena Rebecca Snipe Ackerman, on September 25, 1876. Starbuck's daughter, Mary Theodora, married Eugene Augustus Ebert, son of Christian and Lucinda Elisabeth Rothass Ebert, on September 20, 1877. Eugene worked as a dry goods merchant, likely in his father's millinery shop. His daughter, Ella Starbuck, married Seth Jones Montague, son of Henry Walter and Ann Elizabeth Jones Montague, on December 4, 1879. Seth was a physician and surgeon who took up work in Winston-Salem after moving there from Wake County, where he grew up on Harmony Plantation, which is now listed on the National Register of Historic Places.

Starbuck purchased ten shares of stock with the North Carolina Railroad Company in or before 1872, but by 1878 his shares in the railroad company had grown to twenty. As the Wachovia National Bank was founded in 1879, Darius's 16 shares of stock in the company had to have been purchased subsequently.

Now enumerated as 62, in 1880 Darius was living with his wife Ellen (46), son Henry (14), son-in-law Seth Montague (29), and daughter Ella Montague (21). No longer state attorney, he had returned to his private law practice. A housekeeper named Rebecca Sheek (25) also lived in the household. Now married, his daughter Dora Ebert (23) had moved with her husband, Eugene Ebert (30), to Salem Chapel, where they were raising their son Eugene (2). They employed a housekeeper by the name of Pena Kinnaman (25). Ellen's brother Jacob (35) had also moved to Salem Chapel with his first wife Cornelia (25), where they raised their children Harry (3) and Edward (7 months), the latter of whom was born in November 1879. Their housekeeper was Settie McQuistan (18). Still a resident of Guilford County, and by then retired, Starbuck's father, Reuben, died on October 4, 1880.

Starbuck's son, Henry Reuben, married Nancy Lee "Nannie" Agurs, daughter of Capt. John Lafayette and Mary Mobley Agurs, before 1891. Their family home, the Conrad-Starbuck House, is now on the National Register of Historic Places.

== Slavery ==
On February 24, 1840, Darius Starbuck was written into the will of his "friend" Thomas Adams of Stokes County; Starbuck was also named executor of this will. This was witnessed by Thomas J. Wilson. In the will, Starbuck was named heir to an enslaved family owned by Adams upon the death of his wife Lucy, on the condition that Starbuck would emancipate them "as soon as the law will allow." They were named Syphax, Letty, and their children Syphax L., Mary Addine (Mary Magdeline), and Sarah Jane (Sally). The will was notarized on 15 July 1843. On June 22, 1844, however, Starbuck purchased the family for $85.20 (~$2,944 in 2025). Mr. and Mrs. Adams were to continue using Syphax and his family for labor until both of their deaths. Under the new terms Starbuck was to instead free the family after they had "worked out the consideration money and interest". This mandated that the family work as Indentured servants for Starbuck until the price Starbuck had paid for them—with interest—was returned to him either through labor or by payment. This bill of sale also mentions two more children, Emeline (Nancy Adeline) and Lewis. At the time of purchase in 1844 Syphax was aged about 26 and his wife Letty was about 30. This deed of sale was witnessed by John Hasten, who had to confirm this in court in April 1845. The estate files of Thomas Adams were probated in 1848.

According to the Slave Schedule of 1850, Darius owned one male slave who was reported to census takers as being 37 years old. This may have been Syphax Adams who appears by his fluctuating age in written records to have not known his exact age. As Starbuck's home in Winston was built in 1851, it is possible that Syphax's labor may have been used during the brick mansion's construction. On March 15, 1857, Syphax's daughter, Nancy Adaline Adams, requested to become a member of the Salem African Moravian Church, a month later she began receiving instruction, and by October 11 she was baptized by the church. The church register in October 1857 listed her as, "Nancy Adelia, a single woman, property of Darius Starbuck."

By the time of the 1860 Census, before the abolition of slavery, Syphax and his family were living as freed citizens of the Broadbay Township in Forsyth County. By the time of Starbuck's death in 1887 he owned 322 acres—an area referred to in his will as the "Bouer Place"—in the Broadbay township; it is unknown whether the Adams' ever lived or worked on this property during their residence in Broadbay. On April 14, 1861, Syphax's daughter, Mary Magdalene Adams (single), was baptized into the Moravian Church on the same day as Lewis Hege (also single). At this time Mary was employed by Traugott Frederick Crist, and Lewis was a servant of George Hege. Lewis also served as an elder of the African Moravian Church in Salem. At some point before 1862 Mary and Lewis were married. As there is no surviving record of the marriage in the church register, it is possible that the couple jumped the broom. On July 17, 1862, Lewis and Mary had a child named Arabella Hege who was baptized on November 30, 1862. On February 14, 1864, however, Mary died of typhoid fever. At the time of her death she was described as "a quasi free woman of color." Lewis later remarried to Dinah Ann (Malone). Jane, a servant of Louisa Shober Crossland, died on June 26, 1864, at the age of 19; this may have been Syphax's daughter Sarah Jane "Sally" Adams. On October 23, 1864, Nathan, "a boy in care of D. H. Starbuck," was baptized by the Salem African Church. A girl by the name of Lucinda, who was a servant of Julius Edward Mickey, was also baptized this day. This Lucinda could be Syphax's younger daughter Lucy Adams.

On August 29, 1887, Lewis Hege, widower of Mary Magdalene Adams, was named in the land divisions of Starbuck's estate. A Daniel Hege also owed the estate a personal loan debt of $200 at the time of Starbucks death. The loan was originally lent on July 26, 1859

== Death ==
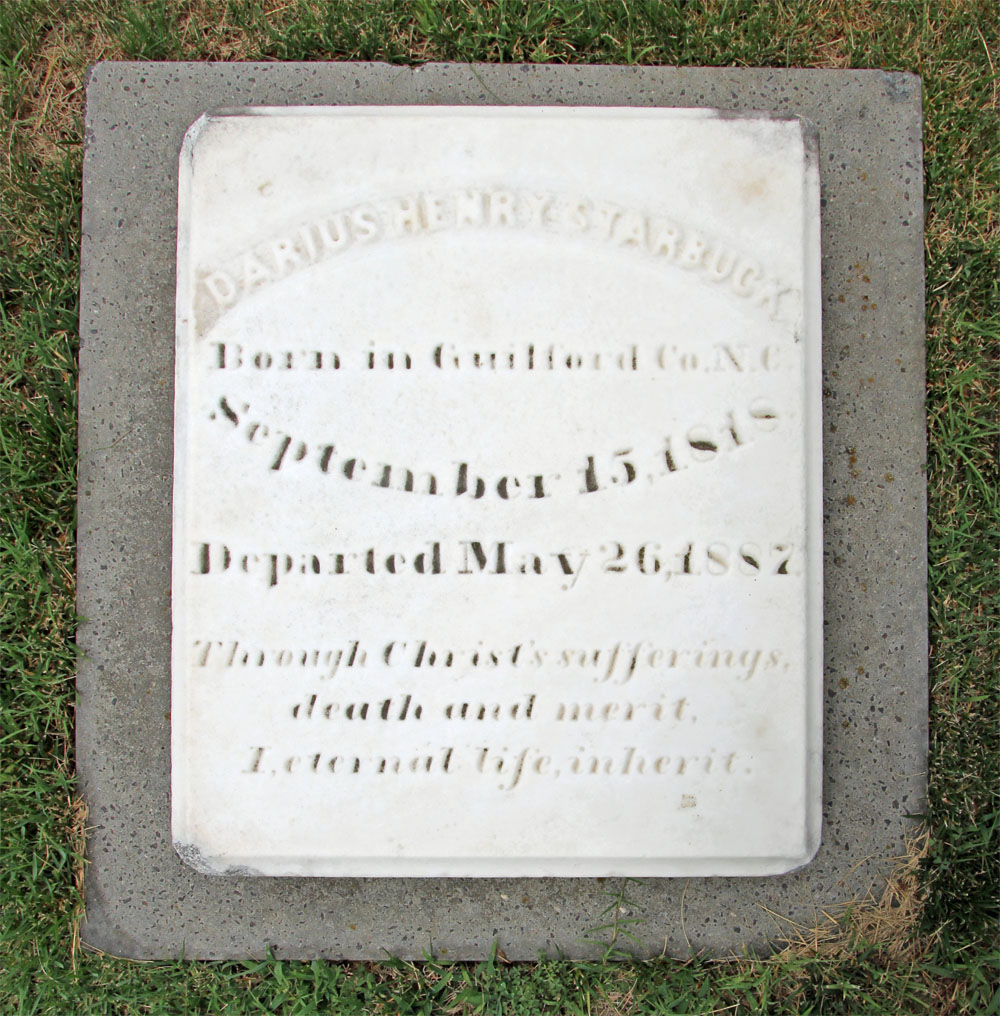
Grave of D. H. Starbuck in the Moravian God's Acre in Old Salem

D. H. Starbuck died on May 26, 1887. He was buried in "God's Acre", a Salem Moravian Graveyard, located in what is today Winston-Salem, North Carolina. His tombstone reads, "Through Christ's sufferings, death and merit, I, eternal life, inherit." Following her death on March 8, 1920, of acute lobar pneumonia in Old Richmond, North Carolina, his wife was buried next to him on March ninth of that year.

=== Estate ===
Starbuck's will was probated on June 21, 1887. His wife, Ellen, was named executrix of his estate, their son Henry a co-executor, and Thomas J. Wilson and Adolphus Hill Eller named "attorneys for [the] posthumous." Starbuck's estate, "consisting of houses and lots in Winston and lots in the country, bank stocks and other stocks, and [personal loan] notes", was estimated in 1887 to be worth from $50,000-$60,000. When adjusted for inflation this figure was roughly equivalent to $1,210,000-$1,460,000 in 2016. His bank and railroad stocks included 20 shares in the North Carolina Railroad Company worth $2,000, 20 shares in Union First Bank worth $1,000, 15 shares in Wachovia National Bank worth $1,500, and 16 shares in the Raleigh and Gaston Railroad Company worth $1,600. His other stocks included 13 shares in the Salem Woolen Supply Company worth $130, 6 shares in the Winston Water Works Company worth $60, 1 5/22 shares in the Winston Tobacco and Snuff Company worth $613, 10 shares in a Warehouse company worth $1,000, and 16 shares in The Delabole Slate Company worth $800. Among the pages of loan debts owed to the estate were two $200 debts from Starbuck's son-in-law Seth Jones Montague, two small debts from his brother Elihu Starbuck, a $500 debt and $547 debt from his brothers-in-law Edward Blickensderfer and Jacob Blickensderfer respectively, and a $105 debt from James "Jim" Fulk who worked as a domestic servant in the Starbuck household. A Michael Fulk also owed the estate $5.

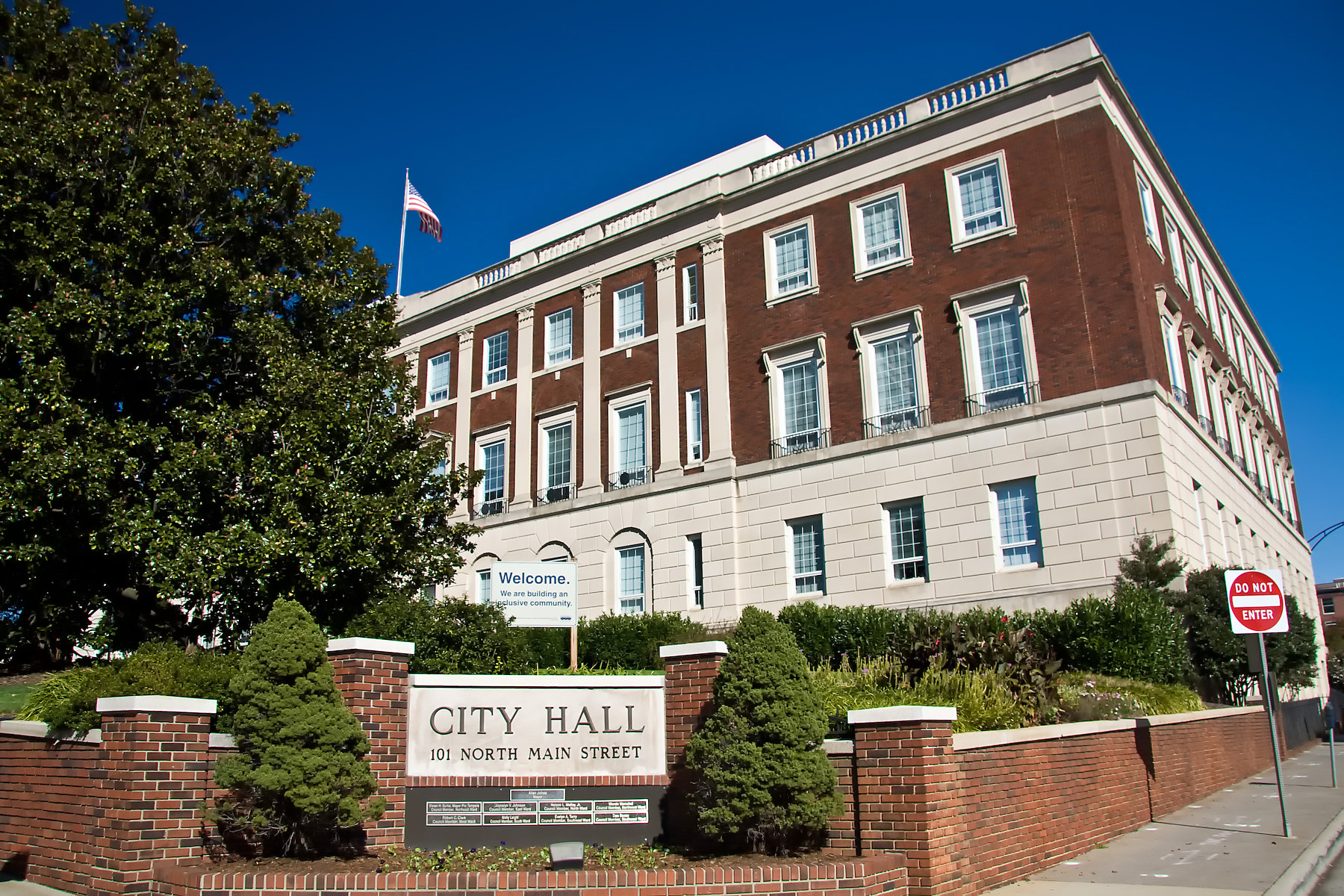
The Winston-Salem City Hall, which stands today on the site of the D. H. Starbuck house

Starbuck's son, Henry Reuben, was notably given half of $5,600 of his bank and railroad stocks. His daughter, Ella, was given a number of lots in East Winston. D. H. Starbuck's mansion was divided between his three children. Henry Reuben was instructed to build four store rooms in the cellar of the Starbuck mansion and to convert the house above into a boarding house of 15 or 16 rooms. Mary Theodora was given the South store room and cellar with 30 feet of the property east of said store room, Ella was given the North store room and cellar with 30 feet of the property east of said store room, and Henry Reuben was given the other two store rooms and the new boarding house above. Ellen was given the right to live in one of these boarding rooms for the remainder of her life. The Starbuck family continued to use and live in the old mansion until about 1916. After Ellen's death, and the termination of Ellen's lifelong right to live in the mansion, Henry Reuben Starbuck sold the property to the city of Winston-Salem for $82,500 on March 29, 1920. The city demolished the house to build the Winston-Salem City Hall in its place. The construction of the city hall concluded in 1926.

== Legacy ==
Following Starbuck's death in 1887, his only son, Henry Reuben Starbuck, took over the family's law practice. Henry attended the Salem Boys School as a child, and graduated from the University of North Carolina with a BA degree. Henry spent a year studying law under Col. George Nathaniel Folk in Caldwell County. He was admitted to the bar by 1888. After having received his own license two years prior in 1886, Adolphus Hill Eller moved to Forsyth, where he became a partner with Henry in the family practice. Henry Starbuck met Eller while they were both attending the University of North Carolina, where the two were roommates. Henry Reuben Starbuck was elected as a Superior Court Judge in 1894. Upon his elevation to the bench, Eller took over the former Starbuck offices alone. In 1913, Eller added Richard Gordon Stockton as a new partner. Henry Reuben Starbuck kept his position as Superior Court Judge for eight years. He was elected to the North Carolina Senate in 1909 and 1911. In 1925 the state legislature appointed him as the first Judge of the newly created Forsyth County Court, where he was reappointed by the Governor for three additional terms. After his time in the Forsyth County Court, Henry Reuben returned to law practice with his son William. He continued to practice until a few months before his death in 1958.

== Sources ==
- The Papers of Ulysses S. Grant: June 1, 1871-January 31, 1872
- Forsyth County Historical Association
- Ancestry.com Historical Records Search
