= Greater Greensboro Consortium =

The Greater Greensboro Consortium is an educational consortium of colleges and universities in Guilford County, North Carolina. The Consortium includes 8 schools; 2 public universities, 2 private universities, 2 private co-educational colleges, a private women's college, and a Community College. The Consortium agreement allows students to cross register for courses at any of the other institutions, up to 50% of their credit hours in a given semester. The agreement also gives full access to the libraries at the other schools. Students will have to pay for the per-credit hour cost and books, but not any additional tuition costs. Also, they will have to abide by the grading standards and honor codes of the school they've cross-enrolled at while they are in those classes

== Members ==
The members of the consortium are:

- The University of North Carolina at Greensboro
- North Carolina A&T State University
- Elon University
- High Point University
- Guilford College
- Greensboro College
- Bennett College for Women
- Guilford Technical Community College

In addition to course registration and library privileges, students attending the colleges in Greensboro itself (UNC-Greensboro, NC A&T, Guilford, Greensboro, Bennett, Elon School of Law, and Guilford Tech) have free access to the HEAT (Higher Education Area Transit) bus which makes stops throughout Greensboro.
