= David Corbin =

David Corbin may refer to:

- David R. Corbin (born 1944), Kansas state legislator
- David T. Corbin (1833–1905), American lawyer and politician
