= Col. Isaac Beeson House =

Historic house in North Carolina, United States

- U.S. National Register of Historic Places
- Location within North Carolina Location within the United States
- Location: South of Colfax, near Colfax, North Carolina
- Coordinates: 36°4′29″N 80°1′20″W
- Area: 2 acres (0.81 ha)
- Built: c. 1790
- Architectural style: Federal
- NRHP reference No.: 80002836
- Added to NRHP: October 16, 1980

Col. Isaac Beeson House is a historic home located near Colfax, Guilford County, North Carolina. It was built about 1790, and is a two-story, three-bay, Federal style brick dwelling with a Quaker plan. It has single shoulder exterior end chimneys and a one-story gable roofed wing.

It was listed on the National Register of Historic Places in 1980.
