= Medium term note =

Kind of debt note

A medium-term note (MTN) is a debt note that usually matures – that is, is paid back – between 5–10 years, but the term may be less than one year or as long as 100 years. They can be issued on a fixed or floating coupon basis.

Contrasted with conventional bonds, MTNs can be offered continuously through various brokers, instead of issuing the full amount at once. Also, in contrast to conventional bonds market, the agent (typically investment bank) in MTN market is not obliged to underwrite the notes for the issuer and the agent is thus not guaranteed funds.

Floating rate medium-term notes can be as simple as paying the holder a coupon linked to Euribor +/- basis points or can be more complex structured notes linked, for example, to swap rates, treasuries, indices, etc. The amount of the issues usually ranges from $100 million to $1 billion. In the recent years, MTNs have become major source of financing in international financial markets, both in US and EU.

== History ==
MTNs were first put into use in 1970s, when the General Motors Acceptance Corporation (GMAC) needed to issue debt with maturity matching to the car loans provided to dealerships and consumers. The commercial papers were not suitable, as their maturities cannot exceed 270 days and the underwriting costs of bond offering were too high for short maturities to be practical. GMAC thus began to sell their notes directly to investors. Because of illiquidity of the secondary market and securities regulations, the market remained relatively quiet until 1980s.

Then, in 1981, investment banks stepped in by providing assistance in the process of issuance and liquidity to the market and one year later, the SEC adopted its rule 415, which permitted delayed or continuous issuance of so-called shelf registered corporate securities, enabling issuers to register securities that may be sold for two years after the effective date of the registration without the need for approval for each individual offering. Because of these changes, investors also become more aware of this instruments and were willing to add it to their portfolios. This improved liquidity and helped the growth of the MTN market. In the beginnings, most of the issues were fixed rate, noncallable and unsecured debt of maturity shorter than 5 years. Throughout the years, due to specific needs of investors and businesses, more flexible forms, like notes with options or floating rates were invented. This also helped spread of its use to Euro markets.

== Issuance ==
MTNs can be issued with a fixed maturity date (noncallable) or can be issued with embedded call or put options and triggers where the notes will redeem early based on certain parameters. MTNs are most commonly issued as senior, noncallable unsecured debt of investment grade credit rated entities which have fixed rates. MTNs offer more flexibility to the issuer and investor both in terms of structure and documentation. Issuance of MTNs to investors based in the US (under the SEC rule 415) requires a separate US MTN program approved by the SEC (or relying on some exemption from registration).

When they are issued to investors outside the US, they are called "Euro Medium Term Notes" (EMTN). These can allow both investors and issuers to enter foreign markets easily. In that case, the requirements are similar. Emissions must have a standardized document, called program, which can be used across all issues and the notes are (mainly) of maturity shorter than 5 years. Similarly to Euro-bonds, EMTNs are not subject to national regulations, such as registration requirements. Even though the EMTNs can be traded throughout the world, most offerings are distributed in London.

The process starts when a company files an shelf registration with the SEC, issues a prospectus and establishes the MTN program. Once this is done, it distributes the notes to the market, usually through investment banks, acting as selling agents, arranging the interest rates and maturities. When investors shows interest, the issuer is contacted and the deal is finalized and confirmed.

== Embedded options ==
When issuing the MTN, the issuer can include call or put option in the program. With call options, the debtor have a right to repay the principal earlier than at its maturity. In case of decrease of the market interest rates the businesses can repay the old notes and issue new ones at the lower rates. As this represents significant increase in risk for the investors, it may result in higher interest rates for these notes. On the other hand, put options guarantees investors possibility to redeem the principal before the maturity (at some specific point of time), which leads to lower interest rates.

== Offering size ==
The offering size plays a significant role in cost differentiating between MTNs and standard corporate bonds. For large issues, the interest and underwriting costs for issuer may be lower for corporate bonds, due to economies of scale in underwriting and its greater liquidity. However, for smaller sizes, this liquidity premium would be insignificant and the economies of scale would have opposite effect. Moreover, the MTN distribution process allows the issuer price discriminate, by splitting the desired amount into smaller issues and negotiate a separate interest rates and maturities for each issue. This may lead to lower financing costs than in case of raising the whole amount at one interest rate.

This, together with the possibility of continuous offering, may play a significant role in choosing, which instrument to use for financing.

== Advantages and disadvantages ==
=== Advantages ===
- The rates of return on MTNs are usually higher than on other short-term investments.
- These notes are custom defined case by case and can be tailored to both issuers and investors needs (within legal requirements).
- For investors, it may serve as a compromise investment opportunity between short-term investments and bonds with long maturities.
- Availability to raise the funds non-publicly.

=== Disadvantages ===
- Higher costs of servicing
- Due to strict issuance documentation requirements, issuers may prefer issuing public bonds instead.
