= Winston-Salem City Hall =

Historic civic building in North Carolina, US

- U.S. National Register of Historic Places
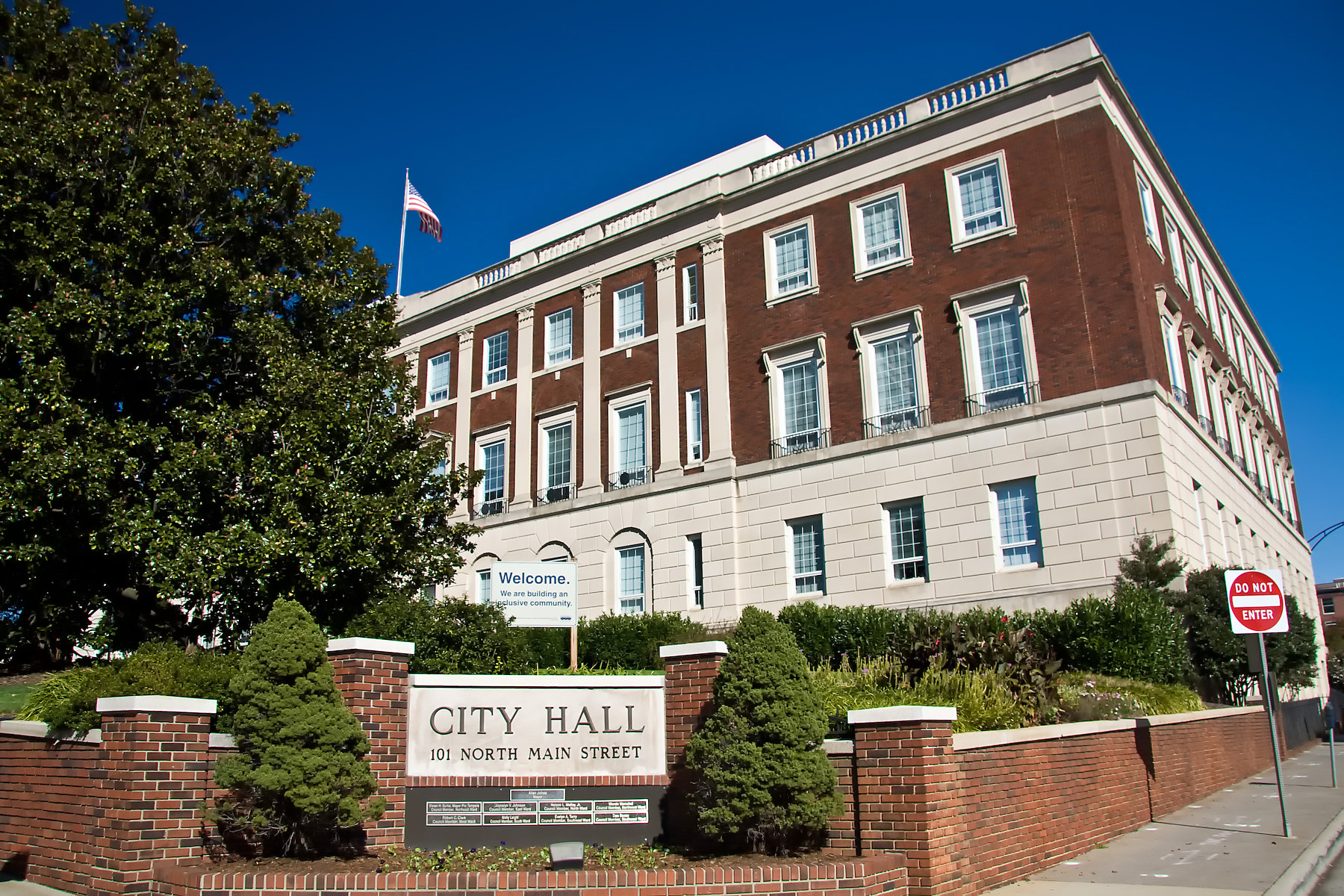
- Winston-Salem City Hall, November 2008

- Location within North Carolina Location within the United States
- Location: 101 S. Main St., Winston-Salem, North Carolina
- Coordinates: 36°5′42″N 80°14′36″W
- Area: less than one acre
- Built: 1926; 100 years ago
- Architect: Northup and O'Brien
- Architectural style: Renaissance Revival
- NRHP reference No.: 01001130
- Added to NRHP: October 20, 2001

Winston-Salem City Hall is a historic city hall located at Winston-Salem, Forsyth County, North Carolina. It was designed by the architectural firm Northup and O'Brien and built in 1926. It is a three-story, U-shaped Renaissance Revival building. It is a brick building with a first floor of rusticated stone. It has a flat roof with a limestone cornice and balustrade with shaped balusters. The Salem town offices were housed in the Salem Town Hall until consolidation in 1913. The building was renovated in 2000.

It was listed on the National Register of Historic Places in 2001.

== History ==
The home of D. H. Starbuck and his family originally stood on the site of the current structure.
