= Shaw-Cude House =

Historic house in North Carolina, United States

- U.S. National Register of Historic Places
- Location within North Carolina Location within the United States
- Location: Off SR 2010, near Colfax, North Carolina
- Coordinates: 36°7′26″N 79°59′00″W
- Area: 20 acres (8.1 ha)
- Built: c. 1790-1800, 1809
- Architectural style: Early Republic, Greek Revival, Late Georgian
- NRHP reference No.: 82003455
- Added to NRHP: June 1, 1982

Shaw-Cude House is a historic home located near Colfax, Guilford County, North Carolina. It consists of two principal sections: a single-pen, 1 1/2-story log structure with an exterior end chimney, probably erected between 1790 and 1800; and the larger 2 1/2-story block, of brick construction, probably built about 1809. The house incorporates Late Georgian and Greek Revival style design elements and embodies stylistic elements of Quaker architecture.

It was listed on the National Register of Historic Places in 1982.
