= Clemency (disambiguation) =

Clemency is the granting of leniency for a punishment, such as a pardon.

Clemency or Clémency may also refer to:

== Places ==
- Clemency, Luxembourg, a town
  - Clemency Castle, a castle located in the town of Clemency, Luxembourg
- Matton-et-Clémency, a commune in northern France
  - Clémency (commune), a former commune in northern France now part of the commune Matton-et-Clémency

== People ==
- Clemency Canning, or Charles Canning, 1st Earl Canning (1812–1862), English statesman and Governor-General of India
- Clemency Burton-Hill (born 1981), English actress, TV/radio presenter and writer.
- Clemency Anne Rosemary Gray, or Rose Gray, (1939–2010), British chef and cookery writer

== Others ==
- Clemency (film), a 2019 American film
- Clemency of Titus or La clemenza di Tito, an opera seria in two acts composed by Wolfgang Amadeus Mozart

== See also ==
- Clemencia (disambiguation)
