= Paymaster =

Profession involving paying salaries

A paymaster is someone appointed by a group of buyers, sellers, investors or lenders to receive, hold, and dispense funds, commissions, fees, salaries (remuneration) or other trade, loan, or sales proceeds within the private sector or public sector. Specific titles within the British government are Paymaster of the Forces, Paymaster General and Paymaster of Pensions.

== Purpose ==
The primary purpose of a paymaster is to receive fees in escrow by buyers in a large transaction, and disburse to the sellers and brokers on the transaction.

A paymaster is usually, but not required to be, a lawyer (also known as a 'lawyer paymaster'). When dealing with commission payments on contracts dealing with large amounts of money (such as oil, gas, steel, iron, gold, MTNs, VGs, t-strips, and other instruments), most banks in the United States are very wary of handling such large amounts of money. In addition, most buyers and sellers of such transactions want to place the money with a neutral third party for disbursement. In most cases, the buyer and the seller involved in the transaction require a paymaster be named to handle all incoming and outgoing funds.

A paymaster is a neutral third party and has no knowledge of any particulars of the transaction. They handle the incoming commissions, and then disburses the funds accordingly. In return for their services the paymaster charges a small fee, which is paid directly to them out of the commission proceeds prior to disbursement.

== Requirements for position ==
In the United States, there is no licensing requirement to be a paymaster. However, a paymaster often is a licensed lawyer, due to the security and safety issue that lawyers in the United States are required to hold any funds that do not belong directly to them in an "Attorney's Trust Account" (also known as an IOLTA account), which is monitored by the state bar, in the state in which the lawyer practices.

== Military ==
=== United Kingdom ===
In 1797, the British Army first appointed paymasters with an Army rank, initially that of captain; they had previously been civilian agents appointed by colonels. In 1878, the Royal Army Pay Corps was formed, existing until 1992, when it was amalgamated into the Adjutant General's Corps.

=== United States ===
In the American Civil War era, a paymaster was generally a commissioned person in the army who held the rank of captain or major, depending on cumulative time in service of the person and the period in which they served (the regulations changed over time). The navy was similar, with the equivalent rank as lieutenant, lieutenant commander or commander.
