= Salem Town Hall =

Historic town hall in North Carolina, US

- U.S. National Register of Historic Places
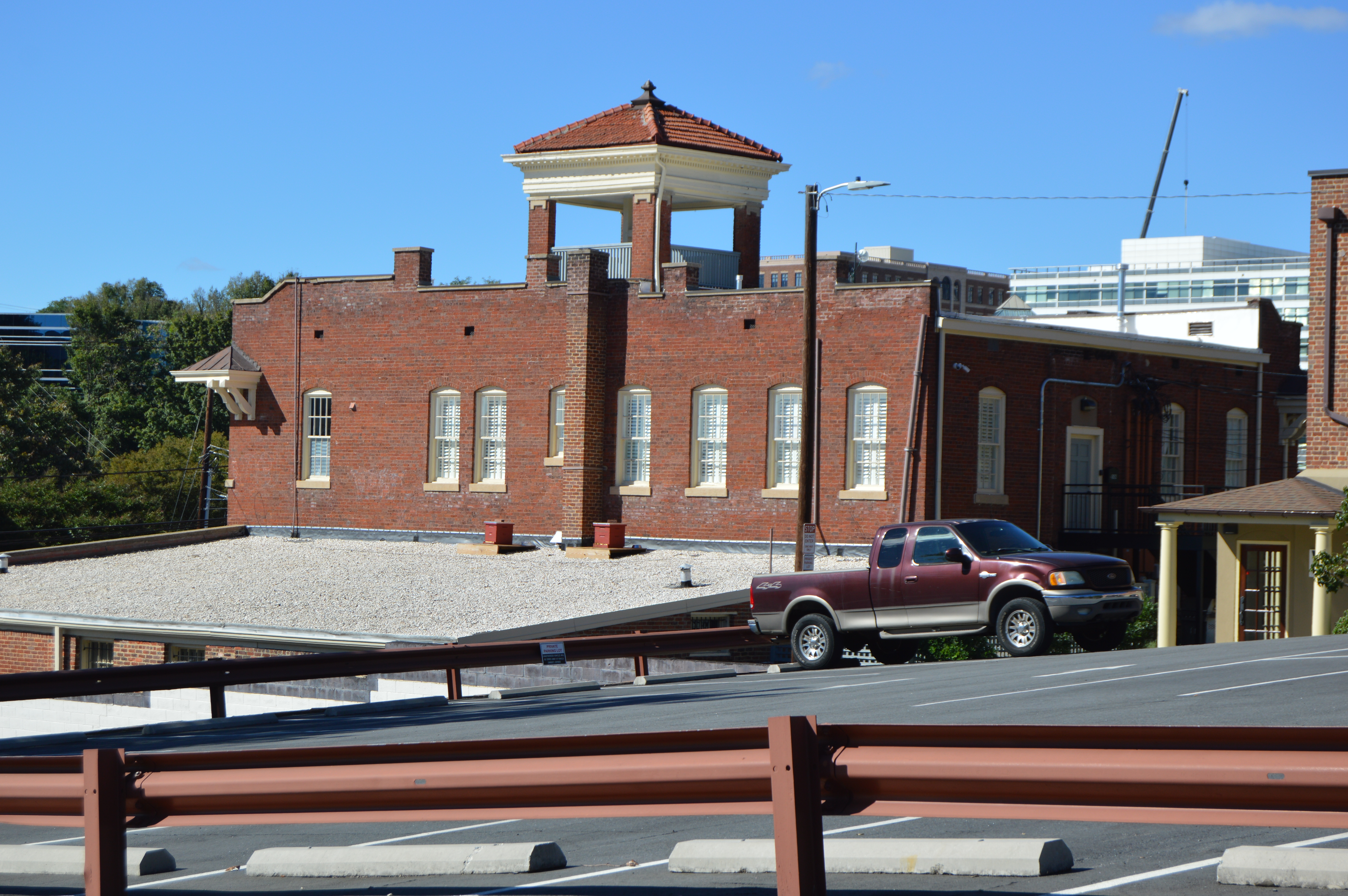
- Southern side and rear

- Location within North Carolina Location within the United States
- Location: 301 S. Liberty St., Winston-Salem, North Carolina
- Coordinates: 36°5′30″N 80°14′38″W
- Area: less than one acre
- Built: 1912; 114 years ago
- Built by: Fogle Brothers
- Architect: Northup, Willard C.
- NRHP reference No.: 83001882
- Added to NRHP: March 17, 1983

Salem Town Hall is a historic town hall located at Winston-Salem, Forsyth County, North Carolina, United States. It was designed by architect Willard C. Northup and built in 1912. It is a two-story brick building with stone, cement and wood trim. It features a three-story corner bell tower and has Italianate and local Moravian design elements. The building housed the Salem Town offices until it consolidated with the town of Winston in 1913, then moved to the newly built Winston-Salem City Hall in 1926. The building continued to be used as a fire station until the mid-1970s. It was subsequently renovated into offices.

It was listed on the National Register of Historic Places in 1983.
