= Guilford Technical Community College =

College in the Piedmont Triad, North Carolina, U.S.

Coordinates: 35.9980°N 79.9189°W

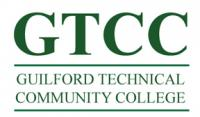
- Former name: Guilford Industrial Education Center
- Motto: Make Amazing Happen
- Type: Public community college
- Established: April 3, 1958; 68 years ago
- Parent institution: North Carolina Community College System
- Accreditation: SACS
- President: Anthony J. Clarke
- Students: 35,000
- Location: Jamestown, North Carolina, United States
- Academic Term: Semester
- Other campuses: Greensboro; High Point; Colfax
- Colors: Green, White & Orange
- Nicknames: Titans & Lady Titans
- Sporting affiliations: NJCAA Division II – Region 10 Conference
- Mascot: Titan
- Website: www.gtcc.edu

Guilford Technical Community College (Guilford Tech, "G-Tech", or GTCC) is a public community college in the Jamestown, North Carolina, United States. It is the fourth largest institution in the North Carolina Community College System and the largest in the Piedmont Triad. Guilford Technical Community College also has campuses in Jamestown, High Point, Greensboro, and Colfax.

== History ==
The college was founded as the Guilford Industrial Education Center on April 3, 1958 as a training facility established to prepare workers for technical jobs created by the rapid manufacturing growth in the county. The future GTCC opened that August in Jamestown on the site of the former Guilford County Tuberculosis Sanatorium [1924-1955] with 50 students enrolled in two classes. In 1965, when the center was elevated to Guilford Technical Institute, the school was authorized to grant associate degrees.

The State Board of Community Colleges approved GTI’s request to add a college transfer program in 1983, and the institution became Guilford Technical Community College. GTCC’s mission has basically remained unchanged: the institution is charged to give the people of Guilford County the training and education they need to compete in the job market.

For the 2008-09 academic year, GTCC is offering 93 degrees, 26 diplomas and 78 certificates, a total of 197 awards from 90 unique programs. Two new degree programs, Health Care Management Technology and Cyber Crime Technology, have been added for 2008-09. The college also offers personal enrichment courses, a variety of adult literacy opportunities and training for business and industry.

GTCC operates from seven locations: the main campus in Jamestown at 601 High Point Road, the High Point Campus at 901 South Main Street, the Greensboro Campus at 3505 East Wendover Avenue, the Donald W. Cameron Campus at 7908 Leabourne Road in Colfax, the Union Square Campus at 124 E. Gate city Boulevard in Greensboro, and two centers; the Aviation Campus at 260 North Regional Road, Piedmont Triad International Airport and the Small Business Center, 1451 S. Elm Eugene Street, Suite 1201 in Greensboro.

GTCC is the third largest of 58 community colleges in North Carolina, with over 35,000 students enrolled annually, as of the Fall 2019 semester. The current president is Dr. Anthony J. Clarke, appointed in the fall of 2020.

As of 2004, GTCC's High Point campus is home to the Larry Gatlin School of Entertainment Technology, a program that started in 2000. It offers associate degrees in Recording Engineering, Concert Sound and Lighting, Artist Management, and Music Performance. It is the only program of its kind in North Carolina, and has garnered nationwide attention from a variety of colleges and universities looking to implement (or improve) similar programs.

The College also offers a middle college program at all of its locations. Students attend honors classes daily. The total program emphasizes academic preparation as well as the development of the total individual. The Middle College offers a diverse academic curriculum including Honors courses in English, mathematics, science, foreign languages, and social studies.

== Background and mission ==
The school opened in 1958 with 42 students and two classes as the Guilford Industrial Education Center on the site of the Guilford County Tuberculosis Sanatorium, which had operated from 1924 to 1955. The purpose of GTCC has remained basically unchanged since it first opened: to give the people of Guilford County the training and education they need to compete in the job market. Today the mission of Guilford Technical Community College is to support success through innovative education, training, and partnerships.

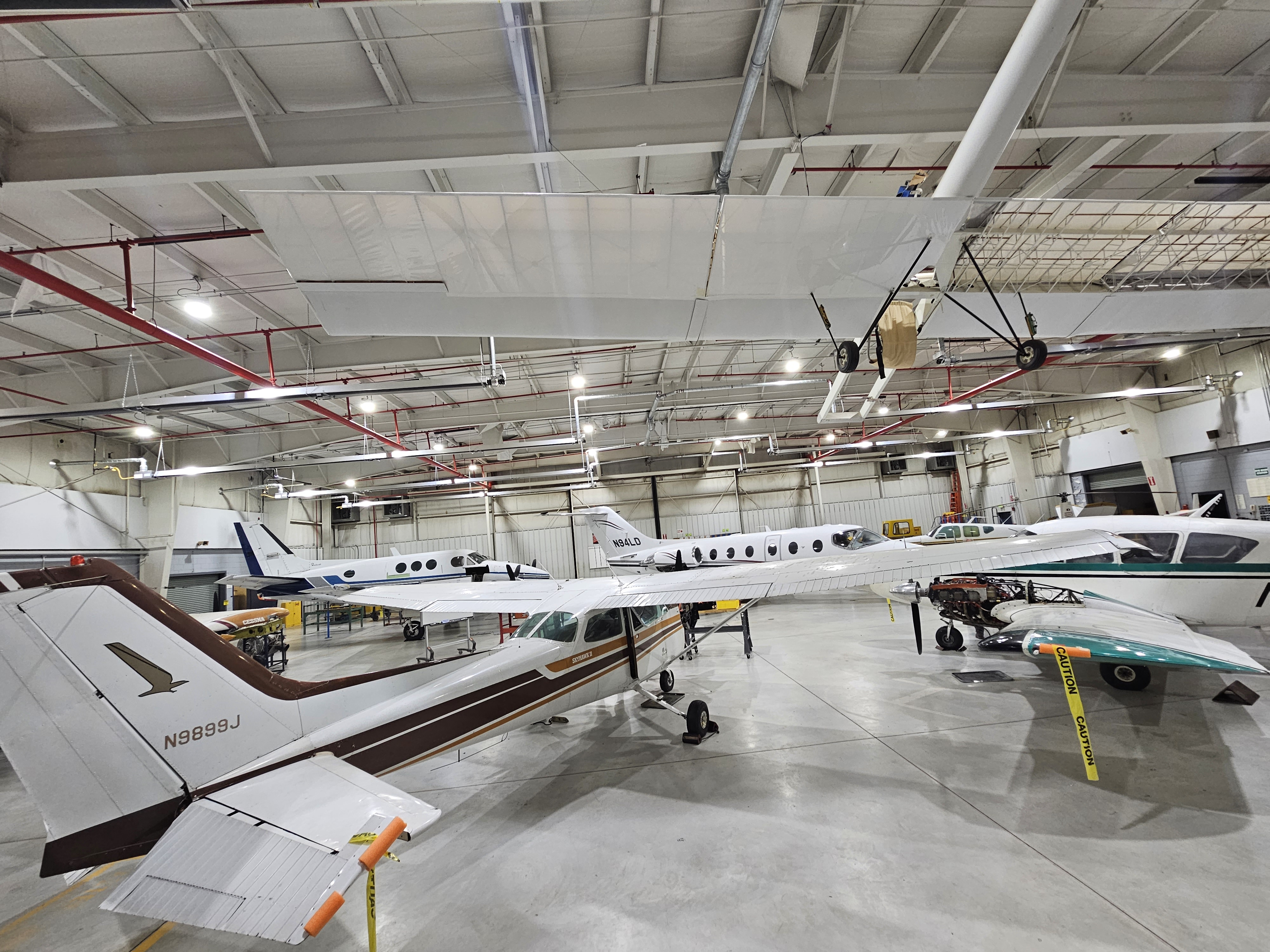
The hangar of the GTCC Aviation 1 building (picture taken 6/22/23)

== Locations ==
Vice President Kamala Harris speaking at the Jamestown campus in April 2021 (transcript)

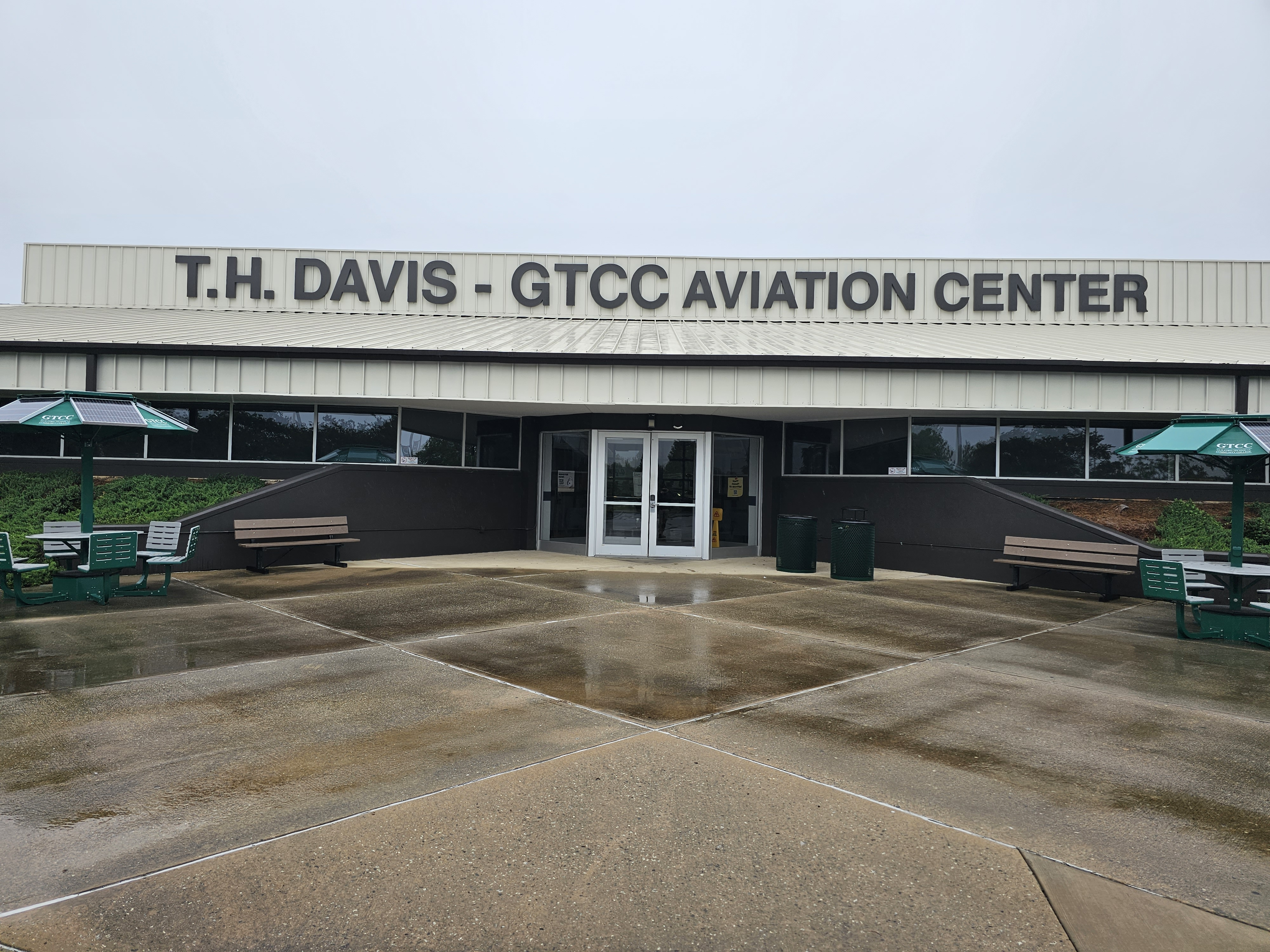
Entrance to Aviation 1 (T.H. Davis Aviation Center)

Campus locations can be found in Jamestown, Greensboro, High Point, Colfax, the Aviation Campuses at the Piedmont Triad International Airport, and the Small Business Center in Greensboro. There are three aviation locations which are all either on, or located near Piedmont Triad International Airport. The first of these is The T.H Davis aviation center, dubbed "Aviation 1" at 260 North Regional Road. It is the primary building for the college's Aircraft maintenance technician program and includes a hangar which houses 12 aircraft including a Boeing 727(outside on the ramp), Robinson R22, MU-300, and many other small General aviation aircraft. The second is Aviation 2 located at 819 Radar Road. It is the primary location for the colleges Avionics and aircraft manufacturing programs, as well as the location for the aircraft maintenance technician structures classes. The third is the Caesar Cone II (Formerly AVIII) which serves the colleges pilot needs. The Center for Advanced Manufacturing, located at the college’s Jamestown campus, offers technical training with state-of-the-art manufacturing technology. In 2007, GTCC began offering eDegrees giving students the opportunity to obtain a number of degrees online without coming to campus.

The school is part of the statewide North Carolina Community College System.
