= Fries Cotton Mill =

Cotton mill in Salem, North Carolina

The Fries Cotton Mill (also known as the Fries Cotton and Woolen Mill, the Salem Cotton Manufacturing Company and F & H Fries Manufacturing Company) was a cotton mill in Salem, North Carolina, first erected in 1840. During the Civil War, the Fries Cotton Mill was an important supplier of wool and cotton goods to the Confederate Army.

== History ==
=== Establishment and growth ===
The Fries Cotton Mill was founded in Salem, North Carolina by Francis "Franz" Levin Fries (1812-1863), a prominent Salem citizen and textile manufacturer who had worked at the Salem cotton factory. Years before the Civil War, Fries had visited cotton mills in northern states to learn about the business and manufacturing methods involved in the cotton mill industry. He later developed methods of his own and subsequently organised the Salem Cotton Manufacturing Company. Leaving his position at another company in 1840, Fries established his own mill at Lot No. 103 on the north-west corner of New Shallowford Street and Salt Street (now Brookston Avenue and South Liberty Street). Fries situated the mill in the center of the lot, next to a small creek. Power was provided by a wood-burning steam engine. The first wool rolls were carded on 14 June, and spinning began four months later. The mechanical carding of the wool was considered Fries' most successful business innovation. In May 1842, Fries publicly announced that he intended “to keep constantly on hand a good assortment of wools, common yarn, Stocking Yarn ready twisted, and cheap Lindseys and cloths of different colors, qualities and prices.” By May 1843 the mill had added "good, heavy Jeans" to the line, which would go on to become one of Fries' most popular products.

In March 1846 Francis Fries entered into a business partnership with his younger brother, Henry W. Fries, and together they formed the firm F & H Fries. The new company formed business links with northern businesses, and began to trade widely throughout the south. The firm added a new cotton mill in 1848, and enlarged the mills again in 1860. By this point the floor capacity of the mill was 24,000 sq.ft., with a dye house, dry-house and warehouses. Francis Fries' standing in the community was such that he was a member of the Forsyth County House of Commons from 1858 to 1859.

=== Civil War era ===
At the outbreak of the American Civil War in 1861, the Fries factory began to supply wool and cotton goods for the Confederate Army and cloth for uniforms, working round the clock throughout the war. In 1861, Henry Fries corresponded with North Carolina governor Henry T. Clark concerning his problems supplying the army with adequate materials. During 1863 and 1864, private houses all around the town were used to dry Fries' cloth before it was made into oilcloth, children in the town wore wooden shoes to save leather for war supplies, and children and elderly townspeople were all involved in preparing different materials for the war effort. As the war progressed, army wool suppliers such as the Fries Cotton Mill were accused of profiteering, with profits from sales to the Confederate government reaching 67%. Governor Zebulon B. Vance publicly denounced these practices in the legislature, to strong objections from the mill owners, with Frank Fries describing Vance's comments as "very sweeping" and stating in a letter that the state's millers "are not more incorrigible than other classes of our citizens". Fellow mill owner and North Carolina secessionist leader John A. Young challenged Vance from the floor of the State Senate and forced a retraction of his comments.

=== Post-War ===
Francis Fries died in 1863, and Henry Fries took over the business, including a tannery, founded in 1769 and run by their relative John W. Fries, and a grist mill. The Fries Cotton Mill was one of the most advanced manufacturing outfits in the state at that time. By 1974, the mill had 1,614 spindles and 40 looms in operation, employed 100 people, and produced both yarn and cloth. Between 1840 and 1877 the mills never stopped work for a day, apart from repairs or refitting.
