= Clemencia =

Clemencia may refer to:

- Clemencia (name), including a list of people with the name
- Clemencia, Bolívar, a town and municipality in Colombia

== See also ==
- Xiphophorus clemenciae, the yellow swordtail species of freshwater fish
