= Conrad-Starbuck House =

Historic house in North Carolina, United States

- U.S. National Register of Historic Places
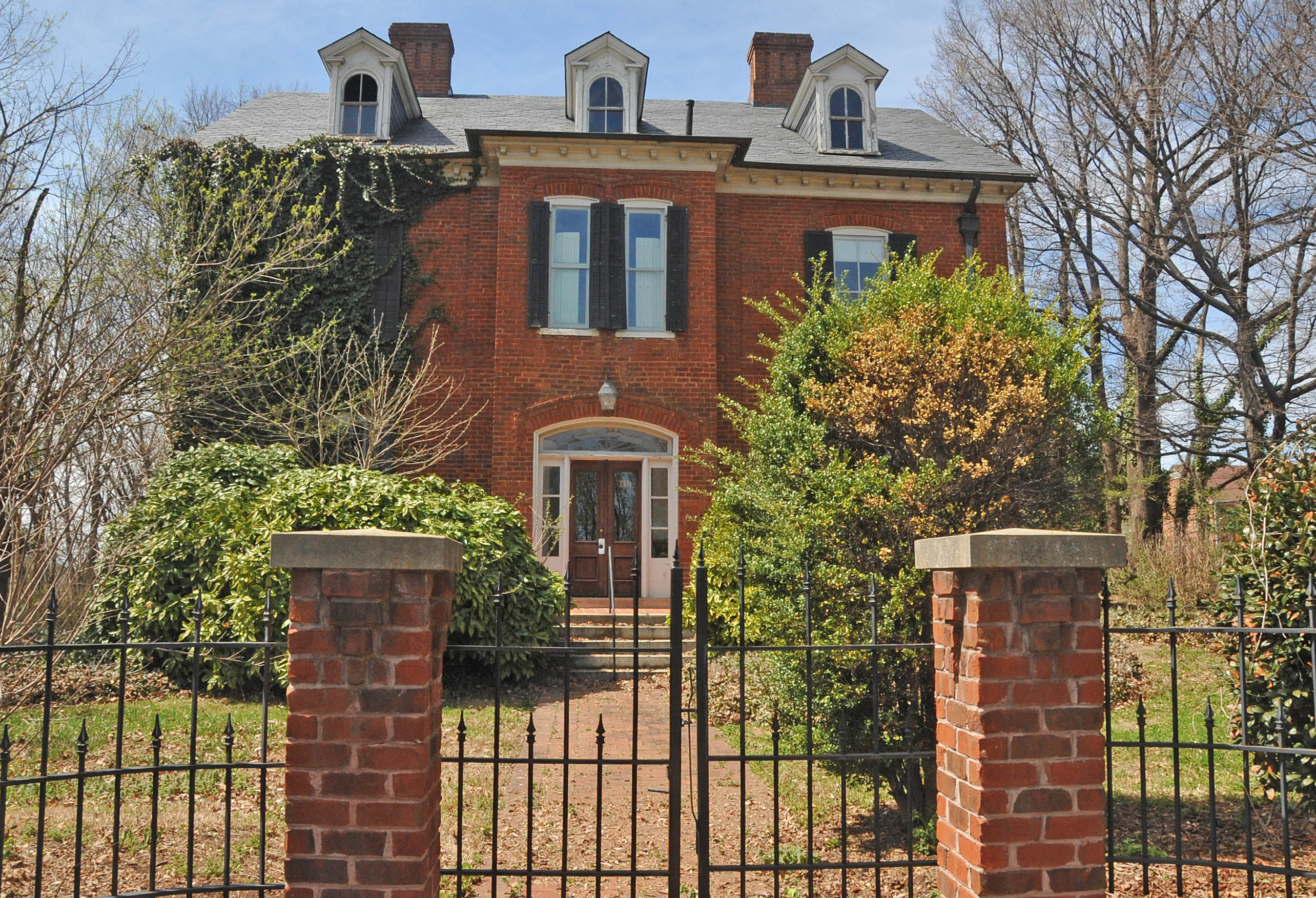
- Conrad-Starbuck House, September 2007

- Location within North Carolina Location within the United States
- Location: 118 S. Cherry St., Winston-Salem, North Carolina
- Coordinates: 36°5′36″N 80°14′50″W
- Area: 0.3 acres (0.12 ha)
- Built: 1884
- Architectural style: Italianate
- NRHP reference No.: 90000792
- Added to NRHP: June 4, 1990

Conrad-Starbuck House is a historic home located at Winston-Salem, Forsyth County, North Carolina. It was built in 1884, and is a 2 1/2-story, three-bay, double pile Italianate style brick dwelling. It has a number of rear additions. The central projecting bay once had a three-story tower, but the top level was removed between 1912 and 1917.

It was listed on the National Register of Historic Places in 1990. The property was purchased in 2019 by Spear Properties Group, with plans to renovate the house and surrounding land to fit historic roots. The house now serves as office suites for downtown Winston-Salem.
