= Endsley-Morgan House =

Historic house in North Carolina, United States

- U.S. National Register of Historic Places
- Location within North Carolina Location within the United States
- Location: Off U.S. 421, near Colfax, North Carolina
- Coordinates: 36°7′23″N 80°0′51″W
- Area: 7.6 acres (3.1 ha)
- Built: c. 1780-1792, 1860
- NRHP reference No.: 84000117
- Added to NRHP: October 25, 1984

Endsley-Morgan House, also known as the "Reuben Starbuck" House, is a historic home located near Colfax, Guilford County, North Carolina. It consists of brick, two-story, single pile main block built between 1780 and 1792, and a frame rear ell built about 1860. A small one-story, brick, shed roofed wing was added in the early-20th century. The house incorporates stylistic elements of Quaker architecture.

It was listed on the National Register of Historic Places in 1984.
