= South Carolina Ku Klux Klan trials of 1871–1872 =

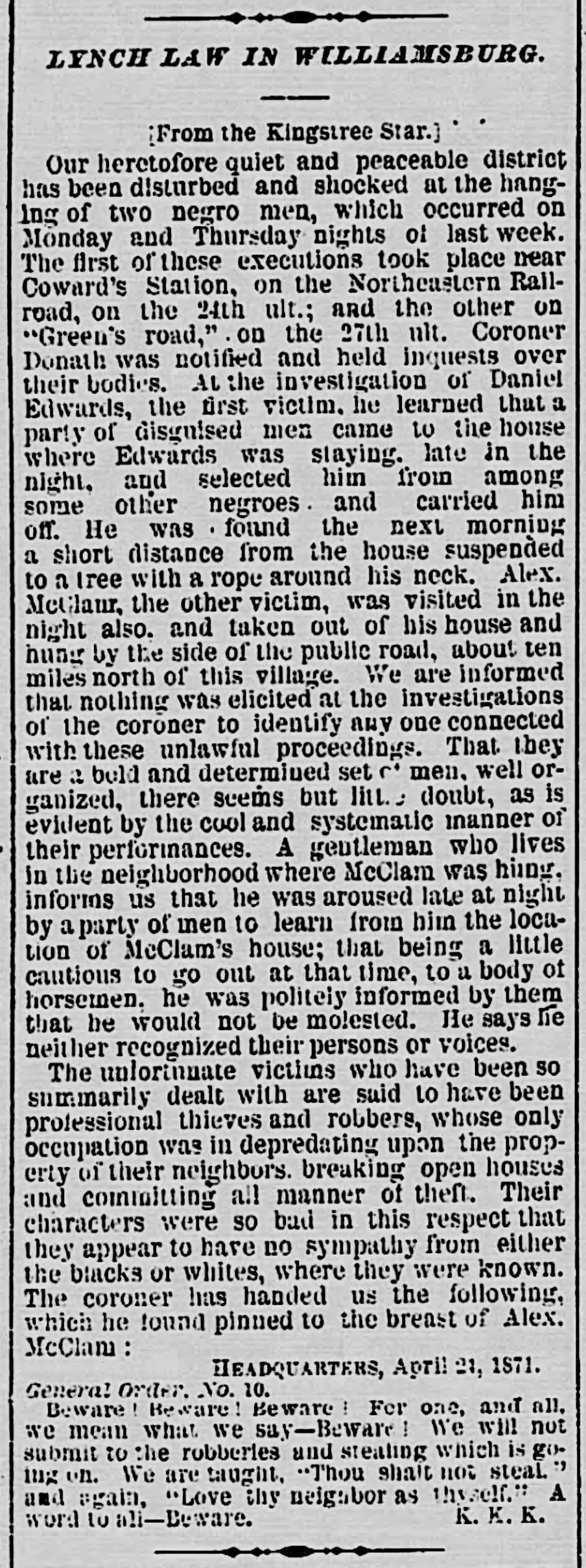
"Lynch Law in Williamsburg" – The KKK claimed responsibility when Daniel Edwards and Alex McClam were hanged near Kingstree, S.C. in April 1871

On October 17, 1871, U.S. President Ulysses Grant declared nine South Carolina counties to be in active rebellion, and suspended habeas corpus. The order allowed federal troops, under the command of Major Lewis Merrill, to execute mass-arrests and begin the process of crushing the South Carolina Ku Klux Klan in federal court. Merrill reported 169 arrests in York County before January 1872. Numerous Klansmen fled the state, and more were quieted by fear of prosecution. Nearly 500 men surrendered to Merrill voluntarily, gave confessions or evidence, and were released. At the Fourth Federal Circuit Court session in Columbia, South Carolina beginning November 1871, United States District Attorney David T. Corbin and South Carolina Attorney General Daniel H. Chamberlain convicted 5 Klansmen in trial court, and secured convictions based on confession from 49 others. In the next Fourth Federal Circuit Court session in Charleston, South Carolina in April 1872, Corbin convicted 86 more Klansmen. Klan activities vanished while prosecutions were ongoing and publicized, but, by the end of 1872, federal will dissolved in the face of waning Republican support for Reconstruction. At the end of 1872 some 1,188 Enforcement Act cases remained to be tried. White Northern interests began to seek a more conciliatory relationship with Southern states, and lamented Southern papers' exaggerated tales of "bayonet rule". During the summer of 1873, President Grant announced a policy of clemency for those Klansmen who had not yet been tried, and pardon for those who had. The remaining cases were not tried, and prosecutions under the Enforcement Acts were all but abandoned after 1874.

== Background 1868–1870 ==
The Klan had been active in South Carolina since at least 1868. Klansmen broke up Union Leagues, intimidated voters at the polls, assaulted blacks and “carpetbag” whites, and killed several Republican leaders in advance of the 1868 election. Still, a coalition of freedmen, carpetbaggers, and local white Republicans surmounted violence and intimidation to elect Republican governor Robert K. Scott. Post-civil war disenfranchising restrictions on ex-confederates barred the majority of whites from voting, increasing the power of Republicans and freedmen. Democrats managed to elect only 6 of 31 senators and 14 of 124 representatives, creating a black Republican majority in the lower house of the state legislature (South Carolina House of Representatives). This Republican majority government with full participation of free blacks incensed white South Carolinians, and was the basis for complaints of "illegitimate government".

In response to Klan violence, and to bolster his own reelection chances, governor Scott lobbied for and eventually passed the South Carolina Militia Law of 1869. The law authorized the creation of militias to suppress insurrection and support state law enforcement. The Governor raised and armed several battalions of militias, but the political and racial prejudice of white South Carolinians against the Republican governor ensured that the militias were mainly black. The sight of black men armed and drilling, parading in formation, and guarding the polls in 1870 further incensed whites and stoked bigoted Klan violence.

Between notions of political illegitimacy and inflammation of existing racial prejudice, the Klan was supported by nearly all of the white population in the nine counties of South Carolina where Grant eventually suspended habeas corpus.

== Violence of 1870 ==
Following the election of 1870, in which the Republican majority was sustained and Governor Scott re-elected, the Klan began a campaign of mass terror in the upcountry of South Carolina. The Klan rode almost nightly following the elections, forcing their way into the homes of freedmen and carpetbaggers, interrogating the men on their political activities, demanding they renounce the Republican party, then whipping and beating them severely, or murdering them. Women were often abused or raped, and houses and barns often burned to the ground. In one reported instance, the Klan visited a white woman known to be harboring two black men. The Klan beat the men, told them to run, and then shot at them as they fled. The Klansmen then forced the woman out of her home, into the road, made her lie prostrate, and poured hot tar into her "private parts. " Many black freedmen fled their homes over these months, choosing to spend the fall and winter nights in the woods and swamps in order to evade Klan violence. Congressional hearings in 1872 document 227 whippings in Spartanburg County alone. In his investigations during 1871, Major Merrill found evidence of at least 600 whippings and 11 murders in York county. The Congressional hearings report 38 murders between the election of 1870 and the suspension of habeas corpus in April 1871, but cover only four out of the nine counties subject to President Grant's order suspending habeas corpus. Historian Lou Falkner Williams reports that "this body count is undoubtedly low".

== Federal Troops Arrive, 1871 ==
By January, 1871 Republican legislators were threatening Governor Scott with impeachment if he did not get the violence in their home counties under control. Scott pleaded to President Grant to intervene, and in March 1871 Grant sent additional troops under the command of Major Lewis Merrill to Spartanburg, Union, and York counties. Scott petitioned Grant for federal military assistance after the passage of the first Enforcement Act of 1870, and the small detachments Grant had provided were enhanced in 1871. Major Merrill investigated Klan activities from March to September, utilizing all means at his disposal including a network of spies paid for by the Department of Justice. More importantly, Merrill sheltered victims of the Klan at his army camp and took their statements. This first-hand evidence was essential to future prosecutions, and the Army's protection provided an environment where witnesses could recount their victimization without fear of brutal reprisals. Merrill was required to submit his evidence to local grand juries for State prosecutions, but discovered that "the whole conduct of their duty was so broad a farce, that it was very distasteful to be forced in contact with it, and present developments show it to have been the most ghastly mockery of justice that it is possible to conceive". The local grand juries proved woefully unable or unwilling to prosecute the outrages of the Klan, indeed Merrill noted that several of the grand jury members were accessories to Klan violence. The local grand juries refused to act on Merrill's evidence. Merrill then met with US District Attorney Corbin to discuss the prosecution of future cases. The two relayed the findings to United States Attorney General Amos T. Akerman, and he soon traveled to Yorkville to review the assembled evidence of atrocities in person. Merrill related that the findings he had collected "convinced [AG Akerman] that the worst reports which had been heretofore made of the power and of the infernal purpose and conduct of the [Klan] fell far short of the facts". Attorney General Akerman left South Carolina convinced that "from the beginning of the world until now", no community "nominally civilized, has been so fully under the domination of systematic and organized depravity". Akerman had been instrumental in Klan prosecutions in North Carolina, but that violence paled in comparison and scope. Akerman considered that Klan activities in South Carolina "amount to war...and cannot be effectively crushed on any other theory." Akerman was able to convince Grant that the situation in South Carolina warranted the full extension of his Enforcement Act powers. On October 12, Grant ordered all persons to "disband and disperse" from the "unlawful combinations and conspiracies" commonly known as the Ku Klux Klan, and to hand over their weapons and disguises to federal marshals. After receiving no such compliance, Grant issued the proclamation declaring nine counties in active rebellion and suspended habeas corpus on October 17.

The suspension of habeas corpus allowed Merrill to make mass arrests in the nine counties of South Carolina upcountry: Chester, Fairfield, Laurens, Newberry, Union in the lower piedmont; Lancaster, Spartanburg, York in the upper piedmont; and Chesterfield in the sand hills. Merrill reported 169 arrests in York County alone before January 1872. Numerous Klansmen fled the state, and Klan activities were quieted by fear of prosecution. Nearly 500 men surrendered to Merrill voluntarily, gave confessions or evidence, and were released. Merrill's Seventh Cavalry division concentrated on York and Spartanburg counties, arresting all those that Merrill had accumulated evidence against. Merrill reported that "a large number of arrests were effected simultaneously all over the county". He noted that the effect of the arrests left the "rank and file" members of the Klan "bewildered and demoralized....They recognized the fact that the game was up, that the organization was broken, and all over the county they betook themselves to flight or came in and surrendered." He describes a stream of fearful participants surrendering to federal authorities, and a complete cessation of violence. "Day after day, for weeks, men came in such numbers that time to hear them confess and means to dispose of or take care of them both failed...In some instances whole Klans, headed by their chief, came in and surrendered together." Merrill resorted to holding "the persons of those most deeply criminal", but sent the rest back to their homes. Regrettably, many of the most elite and important members of the Klan fled at Grant's first pronouncement of October 12. Merrill estimates that "about fifty" of the "leading and most criminal conspirators" against whom he had clear and abundant evidence, fled before arrests could be made.

== Trials ==
United States District Attorney for South Carolina David Corbin empaneled federal grand juries to determine what charges to bring against the members of the Klan. After receiving true bills, that is criminal indictments, from the grand juries, Corbin chose and drafted indictments he would pursue at trial. Corbin, with the input of Attorney General Akerman, endeavored to craft indictments in this case that not only brought Klansmen to justice, but might set a winning precedent for the constitutionality of the Enforcement Acts. Indeed, as much as Akerman and Grant sought to bolster support for the Republican party and the project of Reconstruction by exposing the horrors of the Klan against freedmen, they also sought to win a precedent that the Enforcement Acts were valid constitutional law. Democratic opposition sought to validate the Klan as an institution upholding Southern honor, but also sought to prove the Enforcement Acts violated the Constitution.

The trials were jointly adjudicated by Hon. Hugh Lennox Bond of Maryland, a Federal Fourth Circuit Judge appointed by President Grant, and Hon. George Seabrook Bryan, a district judge for South Carolina appointed by Andrew Johnson.

The prosecution was led by DA Corbin, and supported by South Carolina Attorney General Daniel H. Chamberlain. Major Merrill also supported Corbin as he was intimately familiar with the evidence against the Klan. Corbin requested United States Attorney General Amos T. Akerman's assistance, as Akerman had personally attended the Klan trials in North Carolina. Akerman did not attend trial personally, but corresponded with Corbin frequently via telegraph and letter. Akerman saw an opportunity in South Carolina to broadcast the atrocities of the Klan and swing public opinion against them, no doubt a savvy political move to revitalize Northern support for Reconstruction as well. With this goal stated, Akerman hired a court stenographer to record the trials verbatim - a rare expense at the time.

The defense was led by ex-Senator and ex-United States Attorney General Reverdy Johnson. Johnson was among the most famous attorneys of his day, and was reported to command the highest legal fees of any lawyer active at the time. Indeed, South Carolina Democrats raised a reported US$10,000 (equivalent to $268,750 in 2025) to hire Johnson and Henry Stanbery, the second defense counsel. Adding to Johnson's notoriety, he argued before the Supreme Court on behalf of the slaveholders in the infamous Dred Scott case.

Johnson's second defense attorney was Henry Stanbery of Ohio. Stanbery was another ex-United States Attorney General, and had served in Andrew Johnson's cabinet. Stanbery resigned from his cabinet position at the beginning of Johnson's impeachment trial to lead the embattled President's impeachment defense.

The Circuit court began the first of the trials on November 28, 1871. The proceedings were immediately halted by a challenge from AG Corbin that the jury had been drawn irregularly. Both sides were eager to avoid any technical issues that might preclude the case from being heard by the Supreme Court, and so they stipulated to draw additional jurors from throughout the state and withhold any future objections based on jury selection. This stipulation created majority black juries for all of the cases in the November term. Indeed, the black jurors on the Klan cases were the first non-white jurors that Johnson or Stanbery had ever argued before.

== Constitutional issues ==
With the jury issue settled, the defense then raised a motion to quash the first indictment. Corbin had drafted the indictment to provide a trial court win for constitutional protections newly framed by the Fourteenth and Fifteenth amendments. Corbin, with the instruction and support of Akerman, sought to create a precedent extending constitutional rights to citizens for the first time, including a positive right to vote. The understanding of the time was that voting rights were a negative right, meaning citizens were to be protected from outside interference but not positively empowered. Corbin also sought to use this indictment to move past the state-actor theory that held individuals could not be prosecuted for constitutional crimes, but only States and state forces. The Enforcement Acts were designed to be the federal strength behind positive-rights protection, actively commanding states to protect citizens from other citizens. Where states proved unable to protect this positive right, the Federal government was empowered to act. The Enforcement acts empowered the federal government to charge individuals with conspiracies to deprive citizens of the rights to vote, and Corbin sought to expand protections from that specific 15th amendment right to other rights, including 2nd amendment rights to possess firearms and 4th amendment rights to be protected from illegal searches. Additionally, Corbin sought to win a precedent in favor of the Enforcement Act provision that allowed federal cases to attach state level crimes. In this provision, a federal charge alleging conspiracy to deprive a person of the right to vote could incorporate punishments for state level crimes like assault, robbery, burglary, and murder. This strategy would allow the prosecution of Klan violence in federal courts when State courts could or would not do so. Johnson, Stanbery, and the Democrats that supported them, all sought to prevent this expansion of individual rights and federal powers, under the auspices of maintaining States' prerogatives to enforce justice within each state separately.

Corbin, Johnson, Stanbery, and Judges Bond and Bryan all understood the constitutional significance of the cases before them. In fact, counsel and judiciary endeavored to compile a case that encapsulated all of the issues that they could, and then send one case to the Supreme Court for clarification. Corbin reorganized the charges of the first case, U.S. v. Allen Crosby, into a second case, U.S. v. James W. Avery for just this purpose. Judge Bond issued the opinion in favor of Corbin on two counts of conspiracy: one for conspiracy to deprive black Republican Amzi Rainey of the right to vote, and the other for conspiracy to punish Rainey for having voted in a particular manner. The Judges refused to rule on the remaining counts seeking to incorporate Second, Fourth, and Fourteenth amendment rights. The case was sent to the Supreme Court, but without lower court rulings on the constitutional issues the prosecution's attempt to win a precedent was foiled. With no new precedent set at the lower court, there was no possibility for the Supreme Court to uphold the Radical Republican interpretation.

The pretrial arguments that Bond ruled upon ended the aims of Akerman and Corbin to nationalize the Bill of Rights and Reconstruction Amendments. Although Bond agreed that the Enforcement Acts granted federal authorities the power to prosecute conspiracy charges, he had not agreed with the idea of expanded federal powers that made voting rights, or any constitutional right, positive rights for all citizens in all states. The constitutional expansionist aims of the prosecution could not continue, but they could still bring Klansmen to justice on conspiracy charges.

== Winning trial strategy ==
Over the remaining November 1871 term and the April 1872 term, Corbin executed a winning trial strategy that ultimately gained 140 convictions. Corbin chose to prosecute only the indictments that Judge Bond had approved: conspiracy charges emanating from Enforcement Act protections of 15th Amendment voting rights. In every trial, Corbin first produced the Klan's constitution and oath, a copy of which was secured by Major Merrill in his evidence-gathering mission. Corbin then asked defendants to confirm that it was the one they had sworn to uphold. The contents of the oath included statements that claimed the Klan as enemies of all Radical Republican government, and made Republican supporters their desired targets. This expressly political motivation proved the Klan's primary goals were political intimidation and vote suppression, goals that were expressly illegal under the Enforcement Acts. Corbin then had witnesses confirm the disguises and secret signals that identified Klan members. Black witnesses testified against the Klan in court, a right newly won under the Fourteenth Amendment. Additionally, numerous Klansmen turned state's witness to testify against others, and provided details on the raids and outrages committed by the night riders. This strategy won time and again, earning convictions in all but two cases.

== Cases ==
U.S. v. Allen Crosby: This case was not actually tried, but each of the accused pled guilty to having participated in a raid on Mr. Amzi Rainey. Klan members broke into the home of Mr. Rainey, fired their weapons at him and his family, beat his wife while she was holding a small baby, raped one daughter, and shot another daughter in the forehead, wounding her but not killing her.

U.S. v. Avery (Edward T.): Avery was a physician charged with conspiracy against suffrage generally, with one count against Mr. Samuel Sturgis. Dr. Avery led a party of Klansmen to the home of Abram Brumfield. Mr. Brumfield escaped, but the Klan beat Mr. Sturgis, eventually tying a line around his neck and lifting him off the ground in a near hanging, multiple times. Mr. Sturgis survived. On the same night, Dr. Avery led the group to the home of a black preacher, Mr. Isaac Postle, known in the community as Isaac the Apostle. The Klansmen repeated the hanging process against Mr. Postle, as well as Mr. Postle's wife. The victims identified Dr. Avery beyond any doubt by his crippled hand. Dr. Avery fled the state the morning of closing arguments. When it was discovered that Dr. Avery had fled, Judge Bond interrogated his attorney, Mr. McMasters, as to what happened that allowed Dr. Avery the freedom to escape. McMasters was uncooperative and was tried for contempt, but the case against him was not concluded. Dr. Avery was eventually located in London, Ontario, Canada. The Canadian authorities refused to extradite Dr. Avery, and charges against him were discontinued in 1873.

U.S. v. Avery (James W.): James W. Avery, Dr. James Rufus Bratton, and several others were tried for conspiracy to deprive Mr. Jim Rainey, alias Jim Williams. Mr. Williams was the captain of one of Governor Scott's black militias. He had also served in the Civil War under General William Tecumseh Sherman. Mr. Williams had been an outspoken critic of the Klan and advocate of freedmen's rights. Mr. James Rufus Bratton led approximately seventy Klansmen to Mr. Williams' home, where a detachment of approximately a dozen kidnapped Mr. Williams and lynched him from a tree. Dr. Bratton fled the state, and was eventually discovered with Dr. Avery in London, Ontario, Canada. Again, the Canadian authorities refused to extradite Dr. Bratton, and chargers against him were discontinued in 1873.

U.S. v. Millar: John S. Millar was charged and found guilty of a single count of conspiracy to obstruct suffrage of black Americans. Mr. Millar was a successful plantation owner, and admitted to going to a Klan meeting. Klan witnesses denied that he ever participated in any raids or attacks, and Mr. Millar was found guilty of merely being a part of the Klan and sentenced to three months prison plus a $20 fine.

U.S. v. Robert Hayes Mitchell: This case was based on the same murder of Mr. Jim Williams as the case against Dr. Bratton in U.S. v. Avery (James W.). Mr. Mitchell confessed to holding the horses for the party of twelve that actually murdered Mr. Williams. Judge Bond sentenced Mr. Mitchell lightly, after Mr. Mitchell made it clear that he did not realize Dr. Bratton had intended to murder Mr. Williams, and proved to be a reliable witness against Dr. Bratton and others. He received a sentence of 18 months in prison and a fine of $100.

U.S. v. John W. Mitchell and Thomas B. Whitesides: The defendants were charged with one count of conspiracy to obstruct the suffrage of black Americans, then other counts relating to a specific assault against Mr. Charles Leach. The two had been among the leaders of a party of 30 - 40 Klansmen who raided the home of Mr Leach, a Union League member and outspoken Republican. The Klan lashed Mr. Leach so badly he was unable to work for a week. AG Corbin also used this case to detail Klan violence against other black people and Radical Republicans. Klan witnesses testified about violence against women, various assaults, and the brutal murder of one Mr. Thomas Rountree who had his throat slit from ear to ear. The jury found both men guilty. Mitchell was sentenced to five years in prison and a $1000 fine, while Whitesides was sentenced to one year in prison and a $100 fine.

U.S. v. Robert Riggins: Riggins was tried on the same charges as Robert Hayes Mitchell and Dr. Bratton in U.S. v. Avery (James W.). Riggins was a Klan chief, and was found guilty of conspiracy. He was sentenced to three years in prison and a fine of $100.

U.S. v. Elijah Ross Sapaugh: Sapaugh was tried on conspiracy charges to deprive black Americans of their suffrage, but also for murder charges linked to the violent killing of Thomas Roundtree, who had his throat slit for voting a Republican ballot. He was found guilty by the jury in less than one hour. Afterwards, due to pressures to remove the constitutional issues of attaching State-level crimes to the federal crime of conspiracy, Sapaugh's crime was reduced down to conspiracy only, and he was sentenced to pay a $100 fine and spend one year in prison.

U.S. v. Thomas Zimmerman: acquitted.

U.S. v. Wesley Smith and Leander Spencer: Pled guilty to conspiracy and sentenced to 10 years in prison and $1000 fine.

== Aftermath of the trials ==
DA Corbin was able to secure some 140 convictions through the Klan trials of 1871–1872, but some additional 1,188 cases remained pending at the close of 1872. At the end of 1871, United States Attorney General Akerman had resigned unexpectedly and without explanation, though historians believe his refusal to bow to railroad magnates created political problems for President Grant. The next United States Attorney General, George H. Williams, did not support the continued prosecution of the trials past the second Circuit Court term in April 1872. Corbin and Major Merrill protested that South Carolinians were merely biding their time until federal action quieted, that no lasting social change had yet been won, and that the murders and lawlessness would resume as soon as federal troops withdrew. Ultimately, Williams drafted a policy of clemency regarding the pending cases that Grant would eventually adopt. The remaining enforcement cases were dropped over 1873 and 1874. Troops were sent throughout the South to ensure the election of 1874 went off smoothly, but federal prosecutions under the Enforcement Acts were not continued
