= Salem Chapel Township, Forsyth County, North Carolina =

Township in Forsyth County, North Carolina, U.S.

Coordinates: 36.2293873°N 80.2098219°W

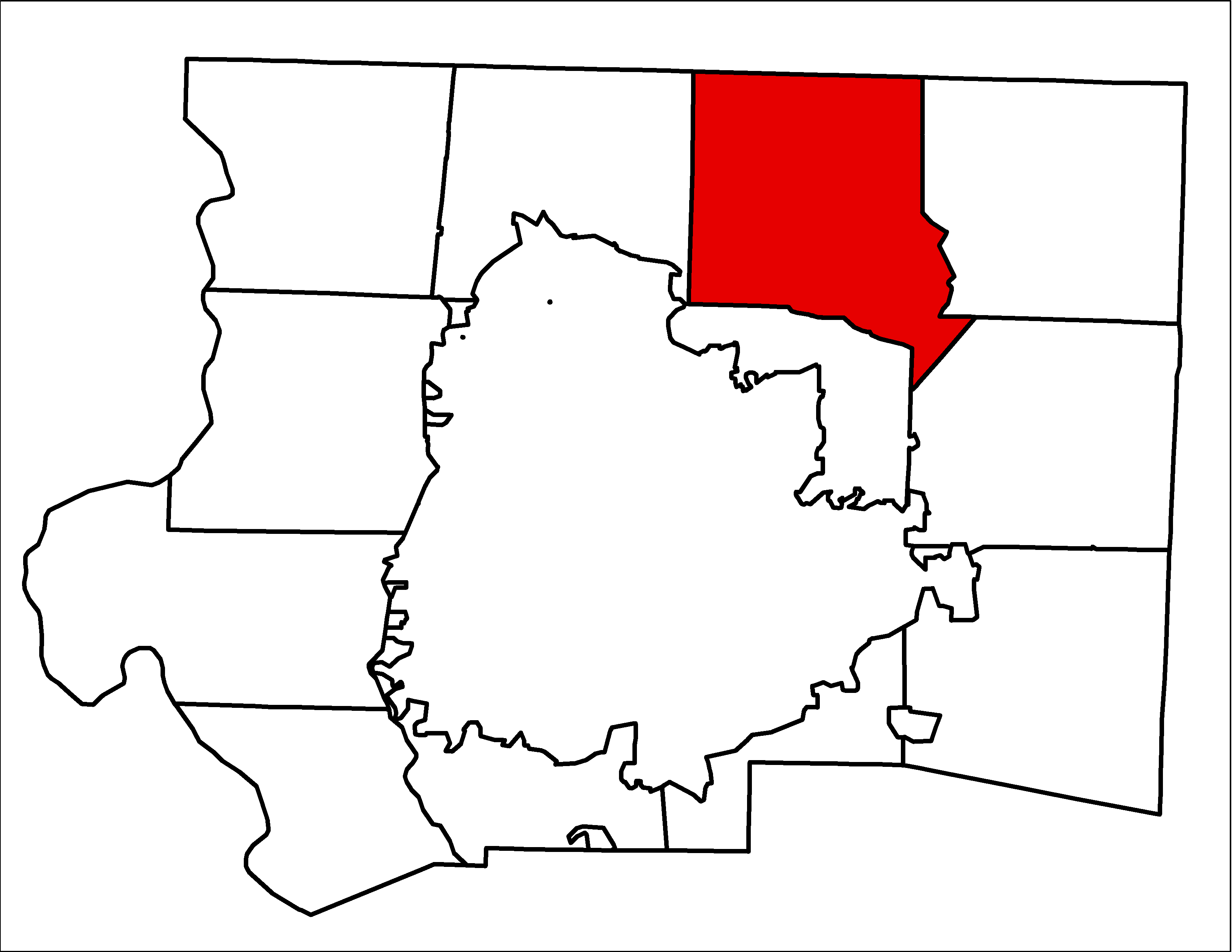
Location of Salem Chapel Township in Forsyth County, N.C.

Salem Chapel Township is one of fifteen townships in Forsyth County, North Carolina, United States. The township had a population of 6,808 according to the 2010 census.

Geographically, Salem Chapel Township occupies 32.59 square miles (84.4 km^{2}) in northern Forsyth County. Portions of the town of Walkertown are in Salem Chapel Township.
