= Colfax, North Carolina =

- Unincorporated community
- Location within North Carolina Location within the United States
- Coordinates: 36°06′45″N 80°00′52″W
- Country: United States
- State: North Carolina
- County: Guilford
- Named for: Schuyler Colfax
- Elevation: 965 ft (294 m)
- Time zone: UTC-5 (Eastern (EST))
  - Summer (DST): UTC-4 (EDT)
- ZIP Code: 27235
- GNIS feature ID: 983372

Colfax is a small unincorporated community located in Guilford County, North Carolina, United States. It is located in the western part of the county. The population in 2010 was 4,136.

The community is a suburb of Greensboro and High Point and is located in the center of the Piedmont Triad. Its main attraction is the Robert G. Shaw Piedmont Triad Farmers Market, where people shop for fresh food from local farmers. Its main school is Colfax Elementary, which is part of the Guilford County School System. It is also the location of one of fifteen Piano and Organ Distributors, one of the largest piano sellers in the country.

In 2000, the community attempted to incorporate, but failed after a joint commission found that the proposed limits were not sufficient for incorporation under North Carolina law, lacking under the population density requirement. On June 30, 2008, the city of Greensboro annexed the main part of Colfax into the city limits and in 2010 the City of High Point annexed Southern portions of the area, though some of Colfax is still unincorporated.

== History ==
The Col. Isaac Beeson House, Endsley-Morgan House, and Shaw-Cude House are listed on the National Register of Historic Places.

== Attractions ==
Colfax was home to the Colfax Persimmon Festival, which held its 14th and final annual event in October 2021. The gathering was held on a historic farm on N. Bunker Hill Road, north of the main road through town.

Triad Park, which splits the border between Guilford County and Forsyth County, is a popular destination for outdoor activities and gatherings.

== Climate ==
The climate in this area is characterized by relatively high temperatures and evenly distributed precipitation throughout the year. According to the Köppen Climate Classification system, Colfax has a Humid subtropical climate, abbreviated "Cfa" on climate maps.

== Notable residents ==
- Mark Robinson, 35th Lieutenant Governor of North Carolina
- Yolanda Hill Robinson, Second Lady of North Carolina
