= Loan note =

A loan note is a type of financial instrument; it is a contract for a loan that specifies when the loan must be repaid and usually also the interest payable. It is similar to a promissory note but the differences can be significant in terms of consequences, especially tax consequences. Chief of these is that by specifying the interest payable, the lender may obtain a tax shield. Loan notes are simple, but important instruments in business and finance. A loan note can also be conceived of as a form of deferred payment, and in the UK the tax treatment of loan notes is as either ‘qualifying corporate bonds’ (QCBs), which provide a tax shield, or as ‘non-qualifying corporate bonds’ (non-QCBs) Loan notes may contain other provisions such as convertibility into equity or other kinds of debt, in which case they are called "convertible loan notes". The loan note is one of the most widely used instruments in financing the entrepreneurial venture and in start-ups.
