= David T. Corbin =

American soldier and attorney (1833–1905)

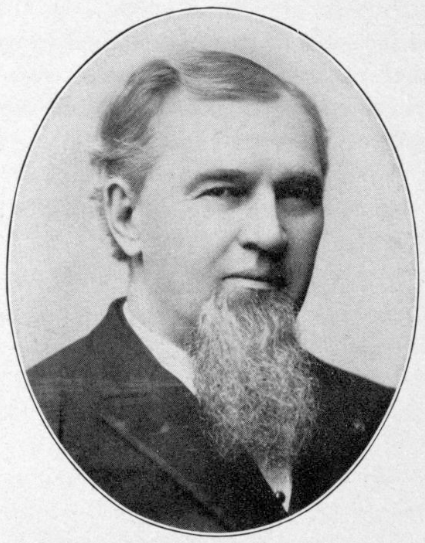
- Born: David Timothy Corbin; August 11, 1833
- Died: December 8, 1905 (aged 72); Chicago, Illinois
- Burial place: Rosehill Cemetery
- Occupation(s): Military officer, lawyer, politician

David Timothy Corbin (August 11, 1833 – December 8, 1905) was a Reconstruction era lawyer, officer in the Union Army, prisoner of war, U.S. Attorney, state senator, U.S. Senator-elect, and judge in South Carolina. He was from Vermont and came south with the Freedmen's Bureau to Charleston, South Carolina.

As a U.S. attorney in South Carolina he prosecuted the Ku Klux Klan Trials in that state. In 1872 he testified before a joint congressional committee.

He was an unsuccessful candidate for the United States Senate, and was afterwards nominated to be chief justice of the Utah Territory but not confirmed. He moved to Chicago and practiced law there. He is buried there.

The South Carolina Historical Society has a collection of his papers.
