= Piedmont Triad =

Region in North Carolina

Coordinates: 35.9557°N 80.0053°W

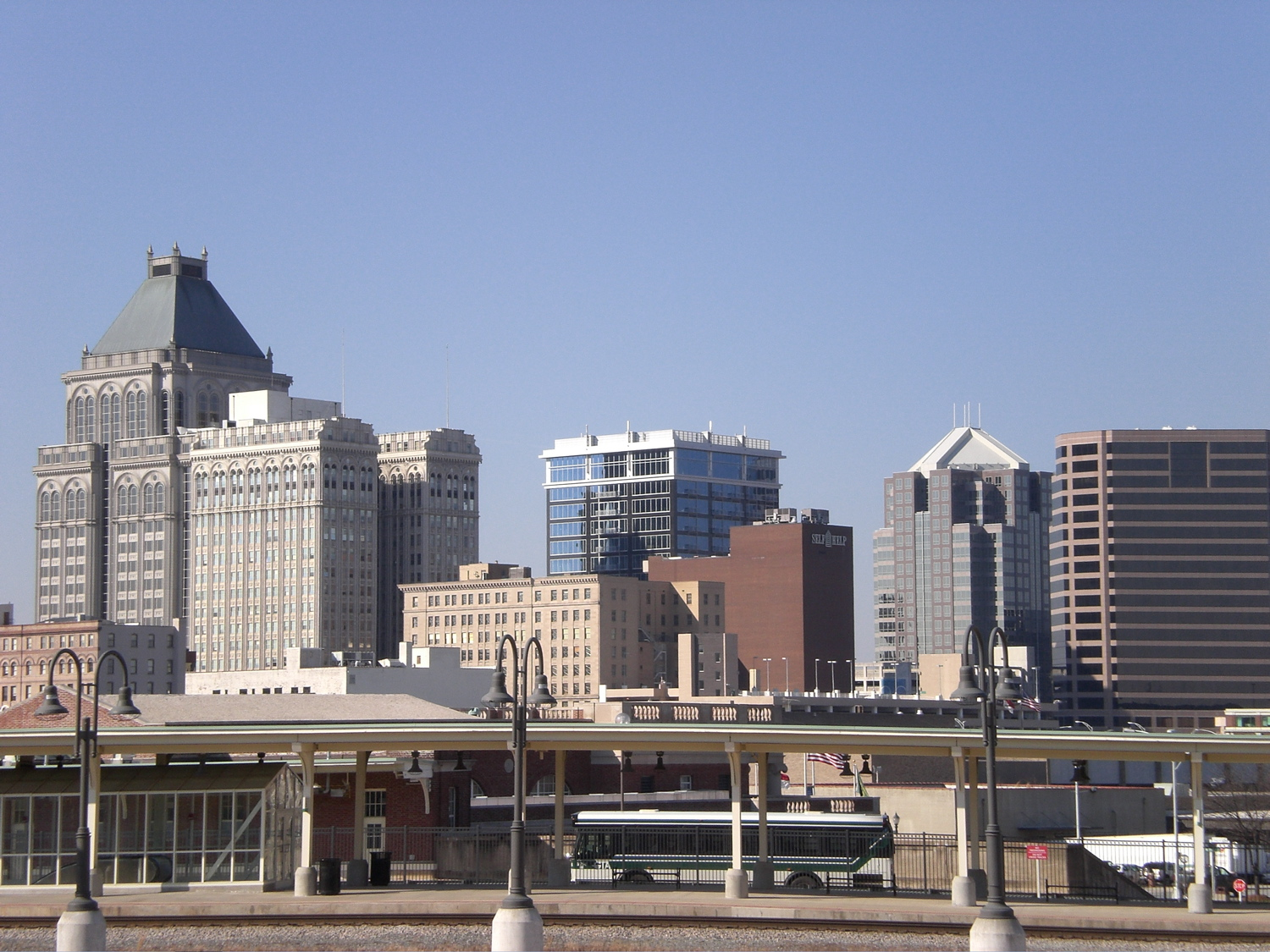
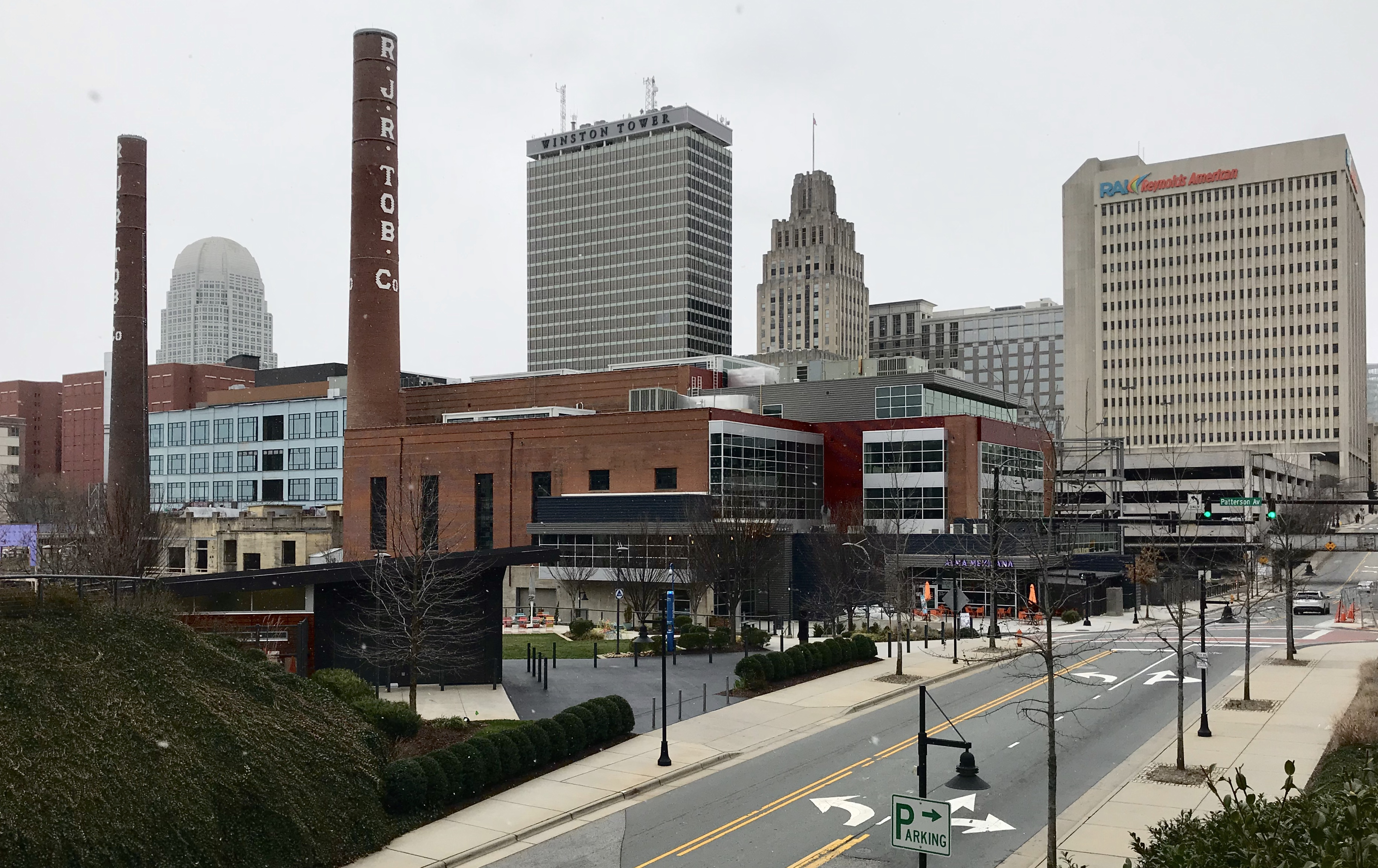
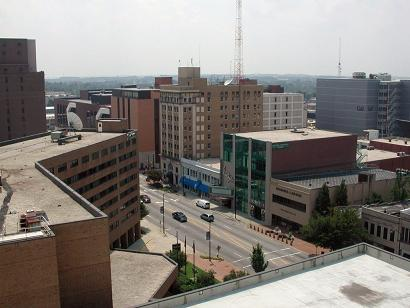
- Images from top to bottom Greensboro, Winston-Salem, and High Point
- Nicknames: The Triad, PT, The 336
Greensboro–Winston-Salem–High Point, NC CSA
Greensboro–High Point MSA
Winston-Salem MSA
Burlington MSA
Mount Airy µSA
City of Greensboro
City of Winston-Salem
City of High Point
City of Burlington
Other counties in the Piedmont Triad
- Country: United States
- State: North Carolina
- Largest city: Greensboro
- Counties: Alamance; Caswell; Davidson; Davie; Forsyth; Guilford; Montgomery; Randolph; Rockingham; Stokes; Surry; Yadkin

Area
  - Land: 5,954 sq mi (15,420 km^{2})

Population
  - Total: 1,705,315

GDP
  - MSA: $89.968 billion (2022)
- Time zone: UTC-5 (EST)
  - Summer (DST): UTC-4 (EDT)
- Area codes: 336, 443

The Piedmont Triad (or simply the Triad) is a metropolitan region in the north-central part of the U.S. state of North Carolina anchored by three cities: Greensboro, Winston-Salem, and High Point. This close group of cities lies in the Piedmont geographical region of the United States and forms the basis of the Greensboro–Winston-Salem–High Point, NC Combined Statistical Area (CSA). As of 2025, the Piedmont Triad has an estimated population of 1,776,615 making it the 37th-largest combined statistical area in the United States.

The metropolitan area is connected by Interstate 40, 85, 73, and 74 and is served by Piedmont Triad International Airport. Long known as one of the primary manufacturing and transportation hubs of the southeastern United States, the Triad is also an important educational, healthcare, and cultural region and occupies a prominent place in the history of the American Civil Rights Movement.

The Piedmont Triad is sometimes confused with the Research Triangle, an adjacent urban area of North Carolina that includes Raleigh, Durham, and Chapel Hill. Both are part of the Piedmont Crescent, a heavily urbanized region of the state that includes the city of Charlotte.

== Definitions ==
=== Combined Statistical Area ===
As part of a redefining of metropolitan areas by the US Census Bureau in 2003, the old Greensboro–Winston-Salem–High Point MSA was broken up into five separate areas—three metropolitan and two micropolitan areas. In some ways, however, the region still functions as a single metropolitan area.

As of July 21, 2023, the Office of Management and Budget (OMB) delineated the Greensboro–Winston-Salem–High Point, NC Combined Statistical Area as consisting of the Burlington, Greensboro–High Point, and Winston-Salem metropolitan areas, as well as the Mount Airy micropolitan area. Those four statistical areas are in turn defined as consisting of a total of ten counties. The statistical areas and their constituent counties are outlined in the following tables:

Statistical Areas

Statistical Area	2025 estimate	2020 Census	Change	Area	Density
Greensboro–High Point, NC Metropolitan Statistical Area	805,945	776,566	+3.78%	2,020 sq mi (5,200 km^{2})	399/sq mi (154/km^{2})
Winston-Salem, NC Metropolitan Statistical Area	712,206	675,966	+5.36%	2,041 sq mi (5,290 km^{2})	349/sq mi (135/km^{2})
Burlington, NC Metropolitan Statistical Area	186,177	171,415	+8.61%	434 sq mi (1,120 km^{2})	429/sq mi (166/km^{2})
Mount Airy, NC Micropolitan Statistical Area	72,287	71,359	+1.30%	537 sq mi (1,390 km^{2})	135/sq mi (52/km^{2})
Total	1,776,615	1,695,306	+4.80%	5,032 sq mi (13,030 km^{2})	353/sq mi (136/km^{2})

Counties

County	Seat	Statistical Area	2025 estimate	2020 Census	Change	Area	Density
Guilford	Greensboro	Greensboro–High Point	562,234	541,299	+3.87%	658 sq mi (1,700 km^{2})	854/sq mi (330/km^{2})
Forsyth	Winston-Salem	Winston-Salem	401,718	382,590	+5.00%	412 sq mi (1,070 km^{2})	975/sq mi (376/km^{2})
Alamance	Graham	Burlington	186,177	171,415	+8.61%	434 sq mi (1,120 km^{2})	429/sq mi (166/km^{2})
Davidson	Lexington	Winston-Salem	180,182	168,930	+6.66%	568 sq mi (1,470 km^{2})	317/sq mi (122/km^{2})
Randolph	Asheboro	Greensboro–High Point	149,516	144,171	+3.71%	790 sq mi (2,000 km^{2})	189/sq mi (73/km^{2})
Rockingham	Wentworth	Greensboro–High Point	94,195	91,096	+3.40%	573 sq mi (1,480 km^{2})	164/sq mi (63/km^{2})
Surry	Dobson	Mount Airy	72,287	71,359	+1.30%	537 sq mi (1,390 km^{2})	135/sq mi (52/km^{2})
Stokes	Danbury	Winston-Salem	46,126	44,520	+3.61%	456 sq mi (1,180 km^{2})	101/sq mi (39/km^{2})
Davie	Mocksville	Winston-Salem	45,855	42,712	+7.36%	267 sq mi (690 km^{2})	172/sq mi (66/km^{2})
Yadkin	Yadkinville	Winston-Salem	38,325	37,214	+2.99%	338 sq mi (880 km^{2})	113/sq mi (44/km^{2})
Total			1,776,615	1,695,306	+4.80%	5,032 sq mi (13,030 km^{2})	353/sq mi (136/km^{2})

=== Councils of Government ===
The Piedmont Triad Regional Council defines a twelve-county region including the ten counties of the Greensboro–Winston-Salem–High Point, NC CSA, plus Caswell and Montgomery Counties.

== Municipalities ==
Definitions of the Piedmont Triad: Census statistical area Additional included area according to Piedmont Triad Council of Governments, Northwest Piedmont Council of Governments and Piedmont Triad Partnership

The name in italics is the county in which the city is located.

=== Primary cities ===
- Greensboro Guilford – 299,035
- Winston-Salem Forsyth – 249,545
- High Point Guilford, Forsyth, Davidson & Randolph – 114,059

=== Secondary cities over 10,000 in population ===
- Burlington Alamance & Guilford 55,481
- Thomasville Davidson 27,183
- Asheboro Randolph 27,156
- Kernersville Forsyth & Guilford 26,449
- Clemmons Forsyth 21,163
- Lexington Davidson – 19,632
- Eden Rockingham 15,527
- Reidsville Rockingham 14,520
- Graham Alamance 14,153
- Lewisville Forsyth 12,639
- Archdale Randolph & Guilford 11,415
- Mebane Alamance & Orange 11,393
- Mount Airy Surry 10,388
- Summerfield Guilford 10,232

=== Other municipalities under 10,000 in population ===
- Alamance Alamance 951
- Bermuda Run Davie 1,725
- Bethania Forsyth 328
- †Biscoe Montgomery 1,700
- Boonville Yadkin 1,222
- †Candor Montgomery 840
- Cooleemee Davie 960
- Danbury Stokes 189
- Denton Davidson 1,636
- Dobson Surry 1,586
- East Bend Yadkin 612
- Elkin Surry 4,001
- Elon Alamance 9,419
- Franklinville Randolph 1,164
- Gibsonville Guilford & Alamance 6,410
- Glen Raven Alamance 2,750
- Green Level Alamance 2,100
- Haw River Alamance 2,298
- Jamestown Guilford 3,382
- Jonesville Yadkin 2,285
- King Stokes & Forsyth 6,904
- Liberty Randolph 2,656
- Madison Rockingham 2,246
- Mayodan Rockingham 2,478
- Midway Davidson 4,783
- †Milton Caswell 166
- Mocksville Davie 5,051
- †Mount Gilead Montgomery 1,181
- Oak Ridge Guilford 6,185
- Ossipee Alamance 543
- Pilot Mountain Surry 1,477
- Pleasant Garden Guilford 4,489
- Ramseur Randolph 1,692
- Randleman Randolph 4,113
- Rural Hall Forsyth 2,937
- Saxapahaw Alamance 1,648
- Seagrove Randolph 228
- Sedalia Guilford 623
- Staley Randolph 393
- †Star Montgomery 876
- Stokesdale Guilford & Rockingham 5,047
- Stoneville Rockingham 1,056
- Swepsonville Alamance 1,154
- Tobaccoville Forsyth 2,441
- Trinity Randolph 6,614
- †Troy Montgomery 3,189
- Wallburg Davidson 3,047
- Walkertown Forsyth 4,675
- Walnut Cove Stokes 1,425
- Welcome Davidson 4,162
- Wentworth Rockingham 2,807
- Whitsett Guilford 590
- Yadkinville Yadkin 2,959
- †Yanceyville Caswell 2,039

† Indicates municipalities in Montgomery and Caswell (counties usually locally included as part of Piedmont Triad)

== Education ==
=== K–12 education ===
The area is served by Winston-Salem/Forsyth County Schools, Rockingham County Schools, Alamance-Burlington School System, Caswell County Schools, Davidson County Schools, Randolph County School System, Stokes County Schools, Surry County Schools, Yadkin County Schools, and Guilford County Schools. The area is home to a number of religious schools, as well as a number of independent schools including Wesleyan Christian Academy, Westchester Country Day School, High Point Friends School, and High Point Christian Academy in High Point, Summit School in Winston-Salem, Bishop McGuiness Catholic High School and Forsyth Country Day School in Lewisville, Greensboro Day School, New Garden Friends School, Caldwell Academy, Vandalia Christian School, B'nai Shalom Day School, and Greensboro Montessori School in Greensboro.

=== Educational institutions ===
More than 20 institutions of higher education are located within the Triad, including:

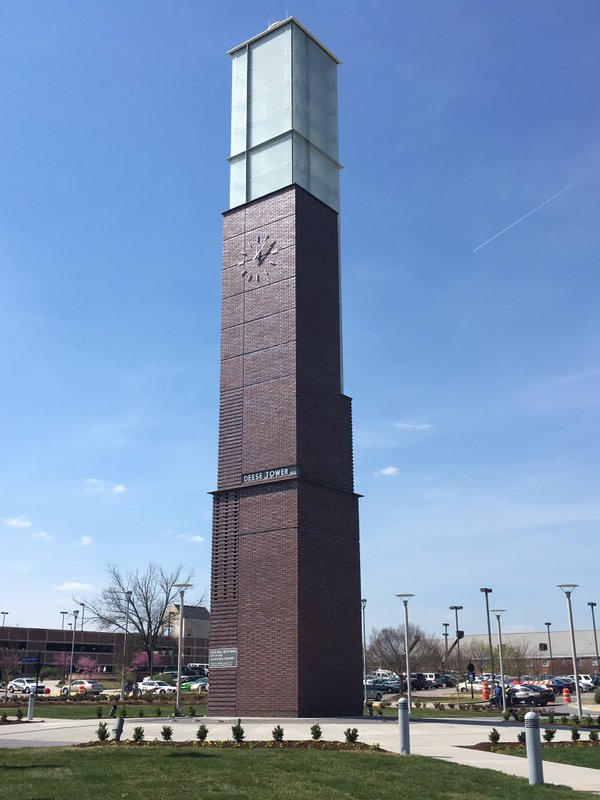
Deese Clock Tower at North Carolina A&T State University

Cottrell Hall at High Point University

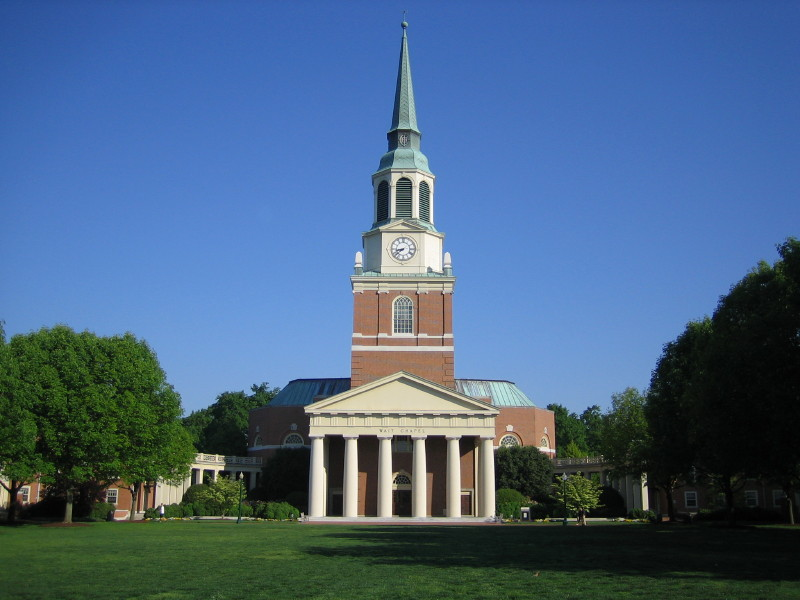
Wait Chapel at Wake Forest University

- Alamance Community College
- Bennett College
- Carolina University
- Davidson-Davie Community College
- Elon University
- Forsyth Technical Community College
- Greensboro College
- Guilford College
- Guilford Technical Community College
- High Point University
- North Carolina Agricultural and Technical State University
- University of North Carolina School of the Arts
- Randolph Community College
- Rockingham Community College
- Salem College
- Surry Community College
- University of North Carolina at Greensboro
- Wake Forest University
- Winston-Salem State University

Three prominent boarding schools also call the Triad home: Salem Academy, Oak Ridge Military Academy, and the American Hebrew Academy.

=== Museums ===
Major art and historical museums contribute to the cultural climate of the region, including the Southeastern Center for Contemporary Art, The Reynolda House Museum of American Art, Old Salem, High Point Historical Museum, Mendenhall Plantation, the Weatherspoon Museum of Modern Art (located on the campus of UNCG), Blandwood Mansion and Gardens, the Greensboro Historical Museum, Guilford Battleground National Military Park, and the Charlotte Hawkins Brown State Museum. The area also has its fair share of scientific museums, such as SciWorks, the International Civil Rights Center and Museum, the Wake Forest Museum of Anthropology, and the Greensboro Science Center. The North Carolina Zoo, the world's largest open-air natural habitat zoo, is located just outside the Randolph County city of Asheboro.

== Economy ==
The economy in the Piedmont Triad is a mixed economy.

=== Industry and manufacturing ===
The Triad area is notable for large textile, tobacco, and furniture corporations. The Triad remains a national center for textile manufacturing, represented by corporations including Hanes based in Winston-Salem, Glen Raven, Inc. based in Glen Raven, and International Textile Group, based in Greensboro. Tobacco remains a prominent crop in the Triad's rural areas and many tobacco companies like Lorillard Tobacco Company of Greensboro and Reynolds American, based in Winston-Salem, call the Piedmont Triad home. Numerous furniture manufacturers are also headquartered in the Triad area, especially in the cities of High Point (deemed the "Furniture Capital of the World"), Thomasville (known as the "Chair City"), and Lexington. The furniture and textile industries have in turn spawned large trucking, logistics, and warehousing businesses in the area. Popular brands like "Thomasville" and "Lexington" are derived from the names of these cities. Recently, however, many furniture and tobacco factories have been closing and/or laying off workers across the region in response to escalating industrial globalization.

=== Technology and biotechnology ===
After many of the old industries in the area began to die out, many Piedmont Triad cities began encouraging technological businesses to move into the Triad. Winston-Salem, for instance, founded within its downtown the Piedmont Triad Research Park, now known as Wake Forest Innovation Quarter, a highly interactive, 200-acre, master-planned innovation community developed to support life science and information technology research and development. Dell, Inc., in the early 2000s struck a deal with local officials allowing for the construction of a new computer assembly plant near the Triad city of Kernersville. Dell pulled out of its contract with the city, however, and left after only a few years. Additionally, the University of North Carolina at Greensboro, the largest institution of higher learning in the region, and North Carolina A&T State University have joined forces to establish the Gateway University Research Park, a technology-based entity that will focus its efforts on a host of biological, life, and environmental science research projects. Upon full build out of the project, it is expected to be housed by two 75-acre (300,000 m^{2}) campuses, employ approximately 2,000 people, and generate $50 million per year to the Triad economy. LabCorp, one of the largest clinical laboratories in the world, has its corporate headquarters and several of its testing facilities in Burlington.

=== Other companies with a significant presence in the region ===
- Biscuitville
- Cook Out
- Columbia Forest Products
- FedEx
- HanesBrands
- Honda Aircraft Company
- Krispy Kreme Doughnuts
- Kontoor Brands
- K&W Cafeterias
- Lowes Foods
- The Fresh Market
- Texas Pete
- Toyota Motor North America
- Volvo Trucks of North America
- Wrangler

=== Shopping ===
The following are the most prominent regional shopping centers/malls in the Piedmont Triad region:

- Four Seasons Town Centre, Greensboro
- Friendly Center, Greensboro
- Hanes Mall, Winston-Salem
- Alamance Crossing, Burlington
- Burlington Outlet Village, Burlington
- Holly Hill Mall, Burlington
- Tanger Outlets, Mebane
- Marketplace Mall, Winston-Salem
- Randolph Mall, Asheboro

== Transportation ==
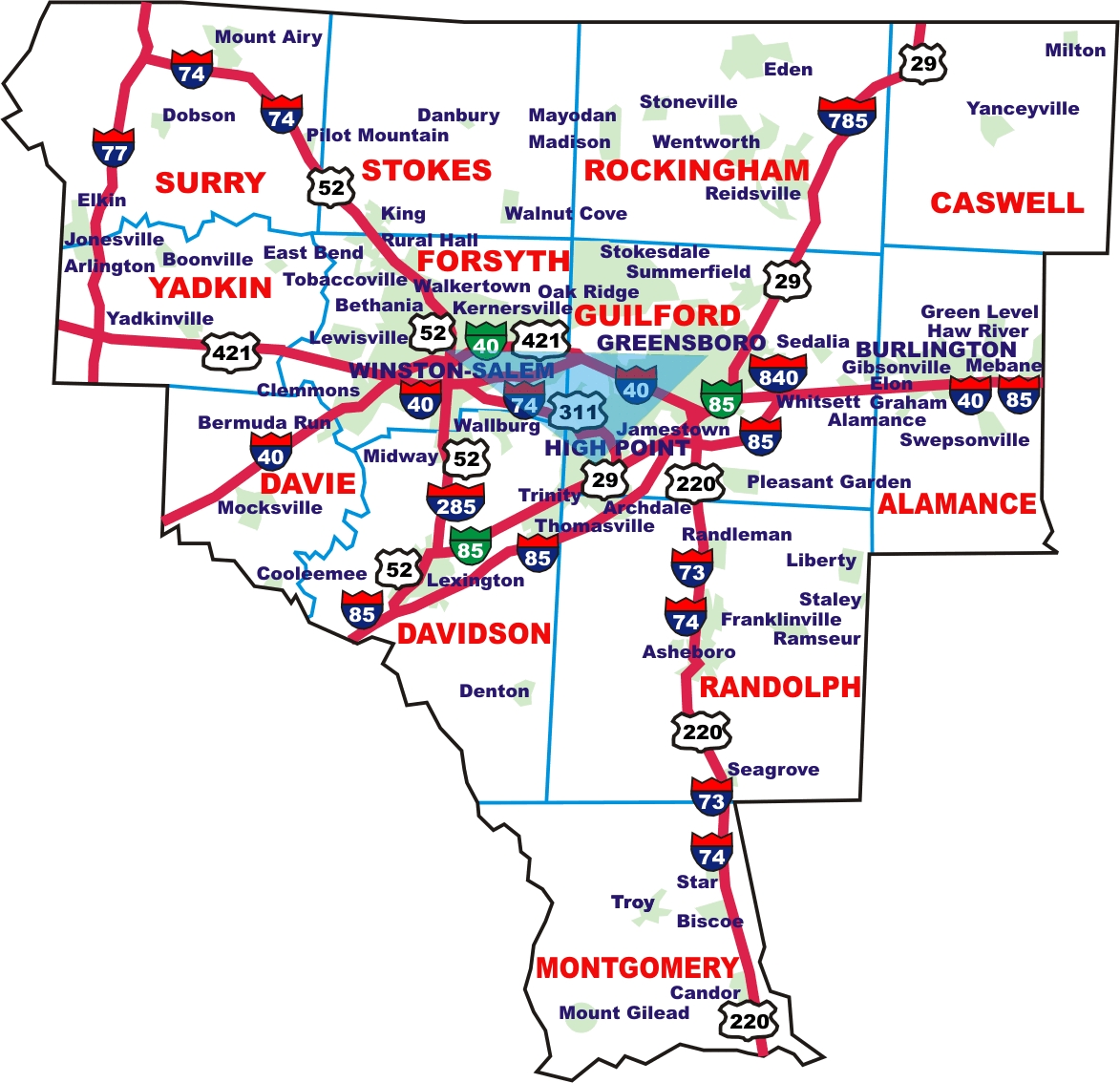
Major roads and cities in the Piedmont Triad and two other nearby counties. The blue triangle represents the three points of the Triad.

=== Primary highways ===
The Triad is home to an extensive freeway network, which is in the process of undergoing a major expansion. Four major Interstate highways and numerous secondary Interstate routes and US routes serve the region:

Interstate highways

- I-40, the primary east–west route across the region. In the eastern Triad, it is conjoined with I-85, which connects to The Triangle and points east. The two routes diverge near Greensboro.
  - I-840 (Painter Boulevard), part of the Greensboro Urban Loop, currently under construction. When complete, I-840 will form the northern half of the loop.
- I-73, the primary north–south route across the region, much of which has yet to be constructed. The route mostly carries portions of US 220 along it, with the exception of the portion along Bryan Boulevard, and another segment that shares the southwestern portion of the Greensboro Outer Loop. This portion was temporarily designated as I-40, with the current and original I-40 being re-designated as Interstate 40 Business.
- I-74, running across the region from southeast to northwest. Like I-73, much of the route has yet to be constructed, but several disjointed segments are currently open and signed as either I-74 or "FUTURE I-74". The route enters the region from the south conjoined with I-73, and diverges from there north of Asheboro toward High Point. The southern segment presently terminates at an intersection with I-40 east of Winston-Salem; new freeway is being built that will form the eastern segment of the Winston-Salem Beltway. The northern segment leaves US 52 in Mount Airy, heading northwest out of the region.
  - I-274, currently only in the planning stages, is the proposed designation for the western half of the Winston-Salem Beltway.
- I-85, connects the region to Charlotte and points southwest. Enters from the east conjoined with I-40, and diverges from said route near Greensboro.
  - I-285, connecting Winston-Salem to Lexington, is currently part of the US 52 freeway being upgraded to Interstate standards.
  - I-785, connecting Greensboro to Danville, Virginia, the route is under development. It is currently part of US 29, much of which is not Interstate standard.

US highways

- US 29 runs roughly northeast to southwest across the region. Most of the route is either concurrent with, or parallel to Interstate highways, including I-785 (when completed) and I-85 (parallel).
- US 52 runs north–south through the region, serving as the main north–south freeway route through Winston-Salem. The entire freeway is planned for upgrade to Interstate standards. North of Winston-Salem most of the route is scheduled to become part of I-74 (until Exit 140 where existing I-74 starts and travels west along its own freeway, and US 52 continues north into town via expressway), while south of the city it is cosigned with I-285.
- US 64 is an east–west highway through the southern Triad, connecting Asheboro, Lexington, and Mocksville.
- US 70 is an east–west highway that closely parallels I-85 through the entire region.
- US 158 runs roughly northeast–southwest across the region, terminating in Mocksville at US 601 and US 64, just south of I-40.
- US 220 is currently the primary north–south route through Greensboro, and travels nearly symmetrically through the middle of the region; most of the route runs along I-73, except between Greensboro and Summerfield where it is named "Battleground Avenue" .
- US 311 is a nominally north–south route that runs northeast–southwest between Danville and Winston-Salem. The former alignment south of Winston-Salem has been fully signed as I-74; work has begun on US 311 signage removal on this alignment.
- US 421 enters the region from the southeast, and joins I-85 in Greensboro. It then takes I-85 south to I-73 north to western Greensboro. The route is then co-signed with I-40 briefly. After leaving Greensboro, it follows along Salem Parkway, the rural area of Yadkinville, and continues into Wilkesboro.

=== Mass transportation ===
Piedmont Authority for Regional Transportation (PART) is the Triad's 10-county regional organization with the goal of enhancing all forms of transportation through regional cooperation. PART Express Bus provides express service to each major Triad city from Piedmont Triad International Airport, while Connections Express connects the Triad to Duke and UNC Medical Centers. PART also has Express Bus service to outlying counties that surround the Triad including Surry, Stokes, Davidson, Yadkin, and Randolph Counties and soon to be Davie County. PART is also administering and developing several rail service studies that include both commuter and intercity rail.

== Government ==
The region is served by the Piedmont Triad Regional Council (PTRC). The PTRC was formed by the merger of the Northwest Piedmont Council of Governments and Piedmont Triad Council of Governments on July 1, 2011. The PTRC is a membership organization of the 12 counties and 62 municipalities in the Triad region.

== Protected areas ==
The Piedmont Triad has several protected areas, which lay entirely or partly in the region:

- Blue Ridge Parkway, partly within Surry and Wilkes counties
- Boone's Cave Park, Davidson County
- Deep River State Trail, partly within Guilford and Randolph counties
- Guilford Courthouse National Military Park, Guilford County
- Hanging Rock State Park, Stokes County
- High Rock Lake, Davidson and Rowan counties
- Haw River State Park, Guilford and Rockingham counties
- Mayo River State Park, Rockingham County
- Mountains-to-Sea Trail, partly within Alamance, Forsyth, Guilford, Stokes, Surry, and Wilkes counties
- Overmountain Victory National Historic Trail, partly within Surry and Wilkes counties
- Pilot Mountain State Park, Surry and Yadkin counties
- Uwharrie National Forest, Davidson, Montgomery and Randolph counties
- Wil-Cox Bridge at Yadkin River Park, Davidson County
- Yadkin River State Trail, partly within Davidson, Davie, Forsyth, Surry, Wilkes, and Yadkin counties

== Media ==
=== Newspapers ===
The following are prominent newspapers in the Piedmont Triad region and the counties each newspaper covers.

- Greensboro News & Record, Guilford County
- The Carolina Peacemaker, Guilford County
- Greensboro Latino, Guilford County
- Hola Noticias, The Triad
- Winston-Salem Journal, Forsyth County
- Burlington Times-News, Alamance County
- Mebane Enterprise, Alamance County
- Courier-Tribune, Randolph County
- Thomasville Times, Davidson County
- The Dispatch, Davidson County
- High Point Enterprise, High Point, Guilford County
- Archdale-Trinity News, Randolph County
- The Stokes News, Stokes County
- The Reidsville Review, Rockingham County
- The Tribune, Surry, Wilkes, and Yadkin counties
- Mount Airy News, Surry County
- Qué Pasa, The Triad
- YES! Weekly, Guilford County, Forsyth County
- Triad City Beat, Guilford County, Forsyth County
- The Jamestown News, Guilford County
- The Stokesdale News, Guilford County
- Northwest Observer, Guilford County

=== Other ===
- The Old Gold & Black, a free daily student newspaper at Wake Forest University in Winston-Salem

=== Television stations ===
All of the Piedmont Triad region belongs to the Greensboro/Winston-Salem/High Point television designated market area (DMA). The following are stations that broadcast to this DMA. These stations are listed by call letters, virtual channel number, network and city of license.

- WFMY-TV, 2, CBS, Greensboro
- WGHP, 8, Fox, High Point
- WXII, 12, NBC, Winston-Salem
- Spectrum News, 14, Greensboro (Charter Communications)
- WGPX, 16, Ion, Burlington
- WCWG, 20, CW, Lexington
- WUNL-TV, 26, PBS/UNC-TV, Winston-Salem
- WLXI-TV, 43, TCT, Greensboro
- WXLV-TV, 45, ABC, Winston-Salem
- WGSR-LD, 47, Independent, Reidsville
- WMYV, 48, My, Greensboro

=== Radio ===
==== FM stations ====
- WFDD (88.5, News/Talk/Classical music, NPR affiliate), operated by Wake Forest University
- WBFJ-FM (89.3, Contemporary Christian)
- WNAA (90.1, Variety), operated by North Carolina A&T State University
- WSNC (90.5, Jazz), operated by Winston-Salem State University
- WQFS (90.9, Variety), operated by Guilford College
- WXRI (91.3, Southern gospel)
- WKRR (92.3, Classic rock)
- WPAW (93.1, Country music)
- WWLV (94.1, Contemporary Christian)
- WPTI (94.5, Talk radio)
- WHPE-FM (95.5, Christian talk)
- WQMG (97.1, urban Adult contemporary)
- WBRF (98.1, Classic Country and Bluegrass)
- WIST-FM (98.3, Regional Mexican)
- WSMW (98.7, Adult hits)
- WMAG (99.5, Adult contemporary)
- WMKS (100.3, Contemporary hit radio)
- WYMY (101.1, Regional Mexican)
- WJMH (102.1, Rhythmic contemporary)
- WUAG (103.1, Variety), operated by University of North Carolina at Greensboro
- WTQR (104.1, Country music)
- WFOZ-LP (105.1, Variety), operated by Forsyth Technical Community College
- WVBZ (105.5, Mainstream rock)
- WKZL (107.5, Top 40 Mainstream)

==== AM stations ====
- WSJS (600, sports)
- WZOO (700, classic hits)
- WPAQ (740, Americana and bluegrass)
- WBLO (790, Spanish adult contemporary)
- WTRU (830, Christian talk)
- WPIP (880, religious)
- WPCM (920, sports)
- WPET (950, religious)
- WTOB (980, classic hits)
- WSGH (1040, Spanish)
- WGOS (1070, Spanish religious)
- WKTE (1090, oldies)
- WMFR (1230, sports)
- WCOG (1320, oldies)
- WPOL (1340, gospel music)
- WLXN (1440, Southern gospel)
- WWBG (1470, oldies)
- WLOE (1940, news/talk)
- WSMX (1500, Contemporary Christian)
- WEAL (1510, gospel music)
- WDSL (1520, classic country, bluegrass, and gospel)
- WBFJ (1550, Christian talk)
- WYZD (1560, Christian)
- WYSR (1590, Spanish)

== See also ==
- I-85 Corridor
- Piedmont Atlantic
- Piedmont Crescent
