= WTQR =

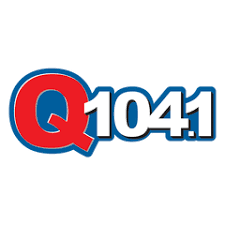
- Winston-Salem, North Carolina; United States
- Broadcast area: Piedmont Triad
- Frequency: 104.1 MHz (HD Radio)
- Branding: Q104.1

Programming
- Format: Country
- Affiliations: Premiere Networks

Ownership
- Owner: iHeartMedia; (iHM Licenses, LLC)
- Sister stations: WPTI, WMAG, WMKS, WVBZ

History
- First air date: December 1, 1947
- Former call signs: WSJS-FM (1947–1974)
- Call sign meaning: "Triad Quality Radio"

Technical information
- Licensing authority: FCC
- Facility ID: 58392
- Class: C
- ERP: 100,000 watts
- HAAT: 528 meters (1,732 ft)
- Transmitter coordinates: 36°22′36.9″N 80°22′7.8″W

Links
- Public license information: Public file; LMS
- Webcast: Listen live (via iHeartRadio)
- Website: q1041.iheart.com

WTQR (104.1 FM, "Q104.1") is a commercial radio station licensed to Winston-Salem, North Carolina, and serves the Piedmont Triad, including Greensboro and High Point. It airs a country music format and is owned by iHeartMedia, Inc. The studio facilities and offices are on Pai Park in Greensboro.

WTQR has an effective radiated power (ERP) of 100,000 watts, the maximum for most stations. The transmitter site is atop Sauratown Mountain near Pinnacle, North Carolina. It is one of three country music outlets in the market; WPAW and WBRF are the others.

== History ==
=== Classical and Easy Listening ===
The station signed on the air on December 1, 1947. Its first call sign was WSJS-FM. It was owned by the Piedmont Publishing Company and was a sister station to WSJS 600 AM. The tower was on what was then U.S. Highway 421 and was later used for a TV station. WSJS-FM was originally powered at 48,000 watts and most of its programming was simulcast from WSJS. In 1953, Piedmont Publishing added a television station, WSJS-TV channel 12 (now WXII-TV).

After the owners of WAAA purchased WYFS, the company ended the classical music format on 107.5 FM. That prompted WSJS-FM to air a mix of classical and beautiful music. Over time, the classical selections were dropped and more vocals were added. WSJS-FM aired an easy listening format until the early 1970s. On November 10, 1972, WSJS and WSJS-FM announced they would be moving their studios and offices to a building originally constructed for IBM in 1961.

=== Switch to Country ===
Piedmont Publishing, in addition to owning WSJS-AM-FM-TV, also owned The Winston-Salem Journal and The Twin City Sentinel, Winston-Salem's two daily newspapers. In 1969, Gordon Gray, the head of Piedmont Publishing, wanted to sell the FM station. However, Roger Stockton believed in the future of FM radio in an era where only some people owned FM receivers. Stockton spent 22 years at WSJS and WSJS-FM/WTQR. He began by selling commercials, and was WSJS sales manager by 1969. WSJS was number one in the Triad, and management feared losing that status if the FM station became popular. Curly Howard of WKBX told Stockton he should play country music on FM, with Stockton agreeing. Summit Communications president Lee Wallenhaupt and executive vice president Richard Barron supported letting Stockton take the FM station in a new direction. In this era, country music began developing a more mainstream, mass-appeal sound.

The station began playing country music in 1974, at first using automation instead of disc jockeys. The call letters were changed to WTQR, standing for the "Triad's Quality Radio." Stockton sold national advertising but did not attempt to sell commercials to local advertisers. He said that would happen once the station proved itself. By 1976, WTQR was number one in the market, though WSJS held on to the top spot among AM stations. Stockton became vice president and general manager of the radio stations in 1979, staying until the stations were sold.

=== Station personalities ===
Dale Mitchell and Aunt Eloise (revealed in 2008 to be Toby Young), morning hosts on WTQR for three years, were nominated for Country Music Association Broadcast Personality of the Year in 1990. Before discussing "everything from politics to 'possums" they would bang pots and pans. Billy Buck was Aunt Eloise's partner before moving to WBIG. "Big Paul" Franklin and Aunt Eloise, who teamed up in 1994, won the CMA Morning Show of the Year award (large markets) in 1997, and WTQR won Station of the Year (large markets) in 1998 and 2002. In March 1998, Big Paul and Aunt Eloise began airing their show on WSOC-FM in Charlotte, North Carolina. some shows were done from Winston-Salem, and some from Charlotte. The pairing lasted less than a year. Big Paul, whose real name was Paul Fuller Jr., died in a motorcycle crash May 16, 2002 on Highway 64 outside Asheboro, North Carolina.

"Brother Bill" Dotson and Aunt Eloise were nominated for a CMA award in 2005. Aunt Eloise dismissed in 2008, replaced by Jeff Roper and Angie Ward, who were nominated for Academy of Country Music and Country Music Association broadcast personalities of the year (large markets) in 2009. Despite critical accolades, "Jeff Roper In The Morning" ratings in key demographics began to deteriorate. Jeff Roper resigned in February 2012 after his show had consistently lost to the market's competing country morning show at WPAW.

=== Changes in ownership ===
NewMarket Media Corp. sold WSJS and WTQR to Radio Equity Partners of Norwalk, Connecticut, in a deal completed in April 1994 and worth in excess of $100 million, as the Connecticut company expanded into the Southeast, looking for the best stations possible. Later in 1994, Radio Equity Partners also bought WNEU, switching that station from country to modern rock. In 1998, iHeartMedia (then known as Clear Channel Communications) bought WSJS, WTQR and WSML. That company's purchase of AMFM Inc. added WMFR, WMAG and the market's other country radio station, WHSL, in 2000, though Clear Channel sold WMFR, WSJS, and WSML to Infinity Broadcasting. At the end of 2000, WHSL and WXRA traded frequencies, and WXRA became WWCC, a more classic-leaning station than WTQR; that station changed from country early in 2003. Also at the end of 2000, WTQR moved from Winston-Salem to Greensboro, the last commercial FM to do so.

In Spring 1995, although still number one with all listeners 12 and over, WTQR lost to WKZL among listeners ages 25 to 54 in the morning. A year later, WKZL did it again, this time also winning with the same age group for all daytime hours. In Fall 1996, WTQR lost to WQMG among the 25-to-54 audience. WTQR finally lost its top position (to WJMH) among all listeners in Fall 1998, for the first time since Greensboro, High Point and Winston-Salem became one market in the 1970s. In Spring 2008, WTQR was no longer the number one country station among all listeners, having been replaced by WPAW. WPAW had flipped to country music in October 2006.

On August 5, 2011 at exactly 1:04 PM, WTQR relaunched as "Q104.1." It changed its playlist to concentrate on more contemporary country music. The station had been "under construction" for most of the summer, and a relaunch/rebranding had been in the works. Changes included DJ Angie Ward was the lone holdover after the relaunch, moving from mornings to midday. David Dean joined the station in January 2012 as APD/afternoon host. Tige & Daniel joined in April 2012 for mornings. Evenings were hosted by Dusty.

=== Sports coverage ===
WTQR was a local affiliate for NASCAR Sprint Cup Series racing. It carried Motor Racing Network (MRN) events & programs until 2011. Performance Racing Network (PRN) events and programs aired until 2000.
