= WMFR =

- High Point, North Carolina; United States
- Broadcast area: Piedmont Triad
- Frequency: 1230 kHz
- Branding: Rebel 104.5

Programming
- Format: Country music

Ownership
- Owner: Chuck Marsh; (Triad Media Partners, Inc.)
- Sister stations: WPCM

History
- First air date: October 15, 1935
- Call sign meaning: "We Make Furniture Right"

Technical information
- Licensing authority: FCC
- Facility ID: 73257
- Class: C
- Power: 1,000 watts unlimited
- Transmitter coordinates: 35°57′20.49″N 80°0′21.14″W
- Translator: 104.5 W283CV (High Point)

Links
- Public license information: Public file; LMS
- Website: www.listentotherebel.com

WMFR (1230 AM, "Rebel 104.5") is a radio station airing a country music format. Licensed to High Point, North Carolina, United States, the station serves the Piedmont Triad area. The station is owned by Triad Media Partners.

== History ==
WMFR signed on October 15, 1935, by the Lambeth family of Thomasville, North Carolina. Among its programs in the early years were Guy Lombardo and Boston Blackie.

WFMY-TV sportscaster Charlie Harville started his career on WMFR in 1938, airing Class D Thomasville Tommies baseball as well as football games.

The 8-story Radio Building in High Point housed several banks, including Commercial National Bank, and NCNB in the late 20th century. As of 2005, WMFR had been located in the 83-year-old building since the 1940s, the longest of anyone there, though for five years the station broadcast from outside Greensboro, returning to its former home on December 26, 2000.

In the late 1940s a sister station, WMFR-FM, was added at 97.7, which later moved to 99.5. In 1983 the station became WMAG.

Max Meeks became morning host in 1947; at age 75, he was still there in 2000 when he took time off for heart surgery, but he had no intention of retiring. He did sell furniture for a while starting in the late 1950s, but he came back to radio. Listeners compared him to Walter Cronkite and James Stewart and considered him an old friend. He tried sounding like famous people when he started, but it didn't work. He was at his best just being a regular person. and he played a wide variety of music, even hymns. Among the stars Meeks interviewed from the WMFR studios: Eddy Arnold and The Carter Sisters, but not Elvis Presley ("I didn't think he would amount to anything"). After other medical procedures, when he couldn't drive to the studio, he just broadcast from home. He was named to the North Carolina Association of Broadcasters Hall of Fame in 1996. Meeks announced his retirement at the end of 2009.

Winfred Red "Diamond" Carter was a WMFR personality for 17 years, playing The Beatles, Elvis Presley, and country and big band music. His Greensboro News & Record obituary said "He was a natural on the radio, warm and chatty, almost like he was sitting in your living room or the front seat of your car. He would take a minute out of every program to read a poem, most of which he had written."

Changes made in 1992 by the Federal Communications Commission allowed a company to own more radio stations than previously possible. Voyager Communications owned WMFR, WMAG and WNEU and would be allowed to sell them in 1994. WNEU was sold to Radio Equity Partners, owner of WSJS and WTQR, later that year.

In 1994, WGLD, at 1320 AM, dropped its adult standards format for all-news radio and began airing Dennis Elliott's WMFR "Opinion Please" show.

In 1995, HMW Communications moved its four stations—WMFR, WMAG, WWWB (which was WGLD) and WFXF—to a location outside Greensboro, though news director Larry Craven continued to do a morning program from the old High Point studios. Wes Jones hosted "Tell Your Neighbor", but he had a producer for the first time—Tom Jorgensen.

In 1996, SFX Broadcasting purchased the HMW stations. In 1997, WMFR and the other SFX stations were purchased by the Capstar Broadcasting affiliate of Hicks, Muse, Tate & Furst Broadcasting Corp. of Dallas, Texas. On July 14, 1999, the company formed by the merger of Capstar and Chancellor Media Corp. began trading as AMFM Inc., a company which in turn merged with Clear Channel Communications in a deal announced October 4, 1999.

In 1998, WMFR programming was once again heard on 1320 AM (called WTCK at the time), which had changed its format to sports talk, which did not prove successful. Among the programs on WMFR at the time were Larry King Live and CBS Radio Mystery Theater.

In 2001, after Infinity Broadcasting purchased the station (as well as WSJS and its simulcast partner WSML), WMFR added Paul Harvey and The Fabulous Sports Babe, and a local talk show hosted by program director Elliott replaced Dr. Toni Grant in the late afternoon. Other changes included a weekly financial talk show and a show about area businesses. Later in 2001, WMFR added Sean Hannity on weekdays other than Wednesday, replacing Elliott, and Meeks' morning show added more news, focusing more on the Triad as a whole. WSJS began helping WMFR with its news coverage.

On February 14, 2007, WMFR (along with WSJS and WSML) was sold by CBS Radio (formerly Infinity) to Raleigh-based Curtis Media Group. The move partnered WSJS with FM news/talk station WZTK, which covers both the Triad and Triangle (as well as southern Virginia and as far south as Fayetteville).

WMFR dropped its long-standing news/talk format on July 15, 2010, switching to sports radio programming.

In January 2022, it was announced that Curtis Media Group would sell WMFR and WPCM to Triad Media Partners. Curtis Media sold WSJS one month prior, meaning these stations were Curtis Media's last properties in the Piedmont Triad market.

On June 22, 2022, WMFR began stunting with country-based Christmas music as "The Christmas Channel". On July 15, 2022, WMFR ended stunting and launched a country music format, branded as "104.5 The Rebel", with 5,000 songs commercial free.

== Previous sports programming ==
WMFR previously aired syndicated programming, both national programming from ESPN Radio (including Keyshawn, JWill and Max, as well as its nighttime and weekend programs) and the regionally syndicated show The David Glenn Show (simulcast from WCMC-FM in Raleigh), and The Drive, with Taylor Zarzour and Marc James (simulcast from WFNZ in Charlotte). It also carried Appalachian State Mountaineers football and basketball and High Point University Panthers basketball, as well as select additional local sports coverage. Most of WMFR's programming was simulcast with WCOG (the former WGLD/WWWB/WTCK) and WSML; all three stations broke away to carry certain programming as necessary.

== Translator ==
Broadcast translator for WMFR
Call sign	Frequency	City of license	FID	ERP (W)	Class	Transmitter coordinates	FCC info
W283CV	104.5 FM	High Point, North Carolina	200582	150	D	35°57′21.5″N 80°0′21.1″W	LMS
