= HPFS =

HPFS may refer to:

- High Performance File System, a computer file system for OS/2
- High Point Friends School, a school in North Carolina, US

== See also ==
- Hi Performance FileSystem (HFS), a computer file system for HP-UX
- HPF (disambiguation)
