= WVBZ =

- Clemmons, North Carolina; United States
- Broadcast area: Greensboro, North Carolina
- Frequency: 105.7 MHz (HD Radio)
- Branding: Real Rock 105.7

Programming
- Format: Mainstream rock

Ownership
- Owner: iHeartMedia, Inc.; (iHM Licenses, LLC)
- Sister stations: WPTI, WMAG, WTQR, WMKS

History
- First air date: 1947 (as WSIC-FM)
- Former call signs: WSIC-FM (1947-1958); WFMX (1958-2006); WMKS (2006-2014)
- Call sign meaning: W V BuZz (former branding)

Technical information
- Licensing authority: FCC
- Facility ID: 501
- Class: C1
- ERP: 30,000 watts
- HAAT: 472 meters (1,549 ft)
- Transmitter coordinates: 36°22′28″N 80°22′31″W

Links
- Public license information: Public file; LMS
- Webcast: Listen Live
- Website: realrock1057.iheart.com

WVBZ (105.7 FM, "Real Rock 105.7") is a mainstream rock radio station serving the Piedmont Triad region. The station is a part of iHeartMedia, Inc.'s cluster in the Greensboro/Winston-Salem market and is licensed to Clemmons, North Carolina. It has studio facilities and offices located on Pai Park in Greensboro, and a transmitter site is located atop Sauratown Mountain near Pinnacle, North Carolina.

== History ==
=== Early history ===
105.7 FM originated in 1947 as WSIC-FM, licensed to the Statesville Broadcasting Company, Inc. in Statesville, North Carolina. It, along with sister station WSIC, was the first AM and FM radio station simulcast combo to sign on simultaneously in the nation.

It became WFMX in 1958. The new call letters were purchased from the American Broadcasting Company in New York and had no specific meaning. WFMX was a well-known and popular country station, and was known for its coverage of NASCAR automobile races, dubbing itself as "The Racin' Station". The station is credited as the first FM station in the U.S. to program country music.

Starting in the late 1980s, WFMX broadcast from a tower in Rowan County and its 100,000-watt signal covered the Charlotte, Greensboro-High Point-Winston-Salem, and Raleigh-Durham markets. As a result, the station would see their ratings show up in the Arbitrons in each of the three markets, yet they remained true to the roots of serving the Piedmont of North Carolina. The station's signal could also be heard in portions of South Carolina, Virginia, and Tennessee.

In 1989, after its studios lost power due to Hurricane Hugo, WFMX broadcast from its transmitter site using a panel truck. Information about affected areas was relayed to WFMX through amateur radio.

WFMX was owned by Texas-based Mercury Broadcasting Inc. and operated in a J.S.A. (Joint Sales Agreement) with Clear Channel Communications. With the move to Greensboro/Winston-Salem, Clear Channel purchased the facility.

On July 19, 2006, WFMX signed off from its Statesville location after nearly 50 years, and prepared for a move north to a new community-of-license, Clemmons, North Carolina. This move resulted in a market relocation from Charlotte to Greensboro-High Point-Winston-Salem. It was extremely controversial for several reasons. WFMX was a staple of the Statesville community and was considered to be one of the most popular stations in the Charlotte market. Many listeners were also under the impression that after the station moved to Clemmons that it would remain a country station and keep many of the same programs and DJs.

=== History as WMKS ===
105.7 KISS-FM

When the station returned to the air on July 24, 2006 to the Greensboro-Winston-Salem-High Point market, after several days of stunting with a loop of song clips and sound blurbs centered around the word "Kiss", WFMX flipped to an Adult R&B format, taking on the WMKS calls and using the "105.7 KISS-FM" moniker/slogan. It became the Piedmont Triad region's second Adult R&B outlet as they took on the more-established WQMG, which is owned by Entercom. They also were the second station in the Clear Channel family to adopt the "KISS-FM" brand as an Adult R&B, the other being WKUS out of Norfolk, Virginia. Kiss FM aired Steve Harvey and Michael Baisden. The same "Kiss" stunt loop used for the format flip would later be incorporated into a longer stunt loop in December 2006 in Raleigh, when soft-AC WRSN "Sunny 93.9" (now country-flavored WNCB "B93.9") flipped to rhythmic AC as WKSL "93.9 KISS-FM." In February 2007, the WFMX calls would go to an AC station in Skowhegan, Maine, dubbed "Mix 107.9."

105.7 Hit Music NOW

On May 22, 2009, WMKS changed their format to a rhythmic-leaning Top 40, branded as "105.7 Hit Music Now". For the first few months of the station's launch, WMKS played more than 20,000 songs in a row, before taking a commercial break, which occurred in the following August. It became the second Top 40 station in the Triad, competing with Dick Broadcasting's longtime (and more mainstream focused) Top 40 station, WKZL. On August 17, 2009, they became the first station outside the Triangle area to broadcast Bob and the Showgram during morning drive. However, in June 2010, due to poor ratings, WMKS ceased airing the Showgram and switched to "Brotha' Fred" in the mornings, which originates from WKSC-FM. It also had competition with Urban rival WJMH, another factor in their reason to play rhythmic hits, but stay within the Top 40/CHR realm.

=== History as WVBZ ===
105.7 the Buzz

105.7 Now moved to 100.3 FM on January 1, 2014 at 5 p.m., taking the spot of sister station WVBZ and rebranded as "100.3 KISS FM." WMKS then became "The Buzz" and shifted its format to Alternative rock. On January 3, 2014 the call letters switched to WVBZ. On February 24, 2014, WVBZ added Woody & Wilcox from WEND in the morning.

The Triad's 105.7/Man Up!

On May 22, 2015, at 6 a.m., WVBZ changed to mainstream rock, branded as "The Triad's 105.7", though most verbal references identify the station as "105.7 Man Up!". The previous format caused the station to fall to 1.6 in the Nielsen ratings. WVBZ had the same playlist as WROO in Greenville and shared some of the same talents This move marks the fourth different format on the 105.7 frequency since the move from Statesville.

Real Rock 105.7

On March 1, 2021, WVBZ rebranded as "Real Rock 105.7". The station added current rock product to its mix of rock hits from the past forty years moving to a straight up mainstream rock.

== Previous logo ==
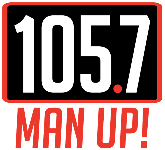
