= The Reidsville Review =

Reidsville Review
- Type: Twice-Weekly newspaper
- Owner: Lee Enterprises
- Editor: Joe Dexter and Susan Spears
- Ceased publication: 2017
- Language: English
- Headquarters: 1921 Vance Street. Reidsville, NC
- Country: United States
- Sister newspapers: Eden Daily News News & Record Winston-Salem Journal Danville Register & Bee
- ISSN: 1541-3349
- Website: rockinghamnow.com

The Review was a bi-weekly newspaper based in Reidsville North Carolina, based in Rockingham County, North Carolina. It was published under that name between 1899 - 2017. In 2017, it merged with two other newspapers in Rockingham County (the Eden Daily News and the Madison Messenger); all three papers publish under the name Rockingham Now.

== History ==
Started in 1888 by Edward Gilliam and J.C. Womack. The Review merged with a two-page newspaper called The Democrat in later 1888. It was called the Weekly Review from 1888 to 1898. The Review was published as a semiweekly paper from 1899 to 1922 and then triweekly from 1922 to 1934, when it became a daily newspaper in 1934 (except Saturday and Sunday). In 1998, it became a morning paper, publishing Tuesday through Friday and Sunday. In 2009, the paper began publishing only two days per week, Wednesday and Sunday.

The newspaper has been under three different owners between 1997 and 2020:

- The Review was owned by Media General. Media General bought the Review, Eden News and Madison Messenger in 1997.
- The newspaper was purchased by Berkshire Hathaway in 2012.
- In 2020, Warren Buffett sold the paper to Lee Enterprises.

In 2017 the paper was merged with two other Rockingham County papers, Eden Daily News and the Madison Messenger, forming RockinghamNow.
