= WSJS =

- Winston-Salem, North Carolina; United States
- Broadcast area: Piedmont Triad
- Frequency: 600 kHz

Programming
- Format: Talk–sports
- Network: SRN News
- Affiliations: Fox News Talk; Westwood One Sports; Radio America; Westwood One

Ownership
- Owner: Truth Broadcasting Corporation

History
- First air date: April 17, 1930
- Call sign meaning: Winston-Salem Journal Sentinel (named for the city's two daily papers, the Winston-Salem Journal and the Twin City Sentinel

Technical information
- Licensing authority: FCC
- Facility ID: 58391
- Class: B
- Power: 5,000 watts
- Transmitter coordinates: 36°7′0.5″N 80°21′25.19″W
- Translators: 93.7 W229CH (Greensboro); 101.5 W268CG (Winston-Salem); 103.1 W276DS (Winston-Salem); 104.9 W285EU (High Point)

Links
- Public license information: Public file; LMS
- Webcast: Listen live
- Website: www.wsjs.com

WSJS (600 AM) is a commercial radio station licensed to Winston-Salem, North Carolina, and broadcasting to the Greensboro/Winston-Salem/High Point media market. It airs a talk and sports radio format. WSJS is owned by the Truth Broadcasting Corporation, with studios and offices in The Factory Building on North Main Street in Kernersville.

WSJS's AM transmitter is near Robinhood Road in Winston-Salem. The station operates with 5,000 watts, using a directional antenna with a four-tower array. WSJS is also heard on four FM translators: 93.7 W229CH in Greensboro, 101.5 W268CG in Winston-Salem, 103.1 W276DS in Winston-Salem and 104.9 W285EU in High Point.

== Programming ==
On weekdays, WSJS has a talk radio format. Early weekday mornings, the station carries two syndicated shows, Our American Stories with Lee Habeeb and America in The Morning with John Trout. In morning drive time, Jeffrey Griffin hosts Triad Today. In middays, syndicated shows include Brian Kilmeade, Todd Starnes and Charlie Kirk. Sports shows begin in afternoon drive time, starting with The Drive with Josh Graham. In the evening, syndicated shows include Rich Eisen and Westwood One Sports.

Weekends feature live sports, including play-by-play and talk programming from Westwood One Sports. Some paid brokered programming and religious shows air on weekend mornings. During talk programming hours, WSJS carries hourly updates from Townhall Radio News.

== History ==
=== 1930s–1960s ===
In the late 1920s, entrepreneur and radio engineer Doug Lee began talking with Owen Moon, publisher of the two Winston-Salem newspapers, The Winston-Salem Journal and The Twin City Sentinel about creating a radio station. The call letters refer to the newspapers, "Winston-Salem Journal" plus "Sentinel".

WSJS signed on the air on April 17, 1930, Holy Thursday. Three days later, the station aired live coverage of the Easter Sunrise Service from God's Acre in Old Salem. That broadcast has continued every year since (except when there were technical problems in 2020 and a previous year's service was broadcast) and is believed to be the longest continuously airing special program in radio history. WSJS broadcast a total of seven hours a day at first.

With WSJS owned by the two local newspapers, the original studios were in the papers' newsroom in downtown Winston-Salem. The transmitter was also in that building. The antenna was a long wire suspended from two towers (one on the Journal Building and the other on the roof of the Carolina Theater building). On May 16, 1939, a new tower on Liberia Street was the tallest in the state at 382 feet. In May 1941, the studios were moved to a building on North Spruce Street designed for broadcasting and the frequency changed from 1310 to 600 kHz.

On June 30, 1933, WSJS began broadcasting Camel Caravan from CBS Radio Network, though it never became a full-time CBS affiliate. Switching to the NBC Red Network in June 1940, the station aired Fibber McGee and Molly, Edgar Bergen and Charlie McCarthy, and shows hosted by Red Skelton, Bob Hope, Kay Kyser, Fred Allen and Fred Waring. Gordon Gray bought the newspapers and the radio station in 1937, and Harold Essex of Chicago became the manager. Together, they made WSJS as important to the area as the newspapers. increasing the station's power. WSJS had been powered at 100 watts at its founding but increased to 250 watts when it moved to AM 600, and 1,000 watts a short time later. In 1943, the tower was moved again and power increased to 5000 watts.

In 1941, Gray added an FM station, W41MM, with its tower near Mount Mitchell, hence its call sign change in 1943 to WMIT. The Radio Center Studios building at 419 Spruce Street was built for the stations in 1942. In 1947, 104.1 WSJS-FM (today WTQR) began in Winston-Salem.

WSJS added a TV station in 1953. WSJS-TV (channel 12) was co-located with WSJS radio for a number of years. The newspapers were sold to Media General in 1968, but longtime publisher Gordon Gray formed Triangle Broadcasting to hold onto the WSJS stations. Gray also acquired the cable franchise for Winston-Salem, Summit Cable. When the Federal Communications Commission (FCC) ruled that one person could not own a television station and a cable system in the same market, Gray sold off WSJS-TV; it is now WXII-TV.

Wally Williams hosted "Carolina in the Morning" on WSJS from 1954 to 1979. The show included the "good word for the day" and a daily devotional. Williams had started as an announcer on the TV station, where he continued to do the weather. When he retired, Winston-Salem mayor Wayne Corpening declared May 31 "Wally Williams Day". Wayne Willard did the news during most of Williams' years on the station, and also served as the station's news director.

George Lee joined WSJS radio in 1968. (*George Lee Bowermaster) Among his characters were Blue the Bionic Dog and Magnolia Sweetbreath. When signing off he would tell people to drive carefully so "that the life you save may be mine. Myself, I would rather be a little late than be the late George Lee." He and Tom Chambers would tell punch lines to jokes on the air—just the punch lines, because the jokes themselves were dirty. Before WSJS, he was on WAIR, and he was one of the "Good Guys" on WTOB.

A 100 milliwatt radio station used the call letters WSJS (initials of the stations' founders), and was located in Midland, Michigan. It was on the air on Friday and Saturday nights from 8 PM to 1 AM, and the whole week between Christmas and New Year's. It operated at 1610 on the AM dial from April 5, 1968, through December 31, 1970, and was geared towards teenagers.

=== 1970s ===
On November 10, 1972, WSJS and WSJS-FM announced a move to a building built for IBM in 1961 after IBM moved out.

In 1976, Lee became program director of WSJS and WTQR. (*George Brown was Program Director in 1979 and at least as late as 1982). Lee left radio in 1982 but his career included roles in several movies and TV shows, and he was the narrator of Beyond the Wheel, a program about NASCAR on The Speed Channel.

In 1979, Glenn Scott moved from WXII to WSJS to replace Williams as morning host, a position he held for almost 30 years. For the last few years, he did the show from his home in Horse Shoe, near Hendersonville, after moving closer to his children. He almost considered retiring but changed his mind when the station made arrangements for the remote broadcasts.

=== 1980s ===
In 1982, former WTOB news anchor Smith Patterson joined the station and in 1983 was made full-time by then station manager Roger Stockton. Patterson then joined Glenn Scott on the morning show for the rest of Scott's tenure 1984–2007. Patterson was with the station doing the morning news with JR Snider and also hosting the 5 AM. Early Morning News With Smith Patterson until March 2012.

As of 1986, WSJS played "a light, pop sound that is neither rock 'n' roll nor classical" for people over 35. Manager Donald Boyles said many markets did not have this type of music.

In 1988, Bob Costner became WSJS news director, a position he would hold for nearly 20 years.

=== 1990s ===
NewMarket Media Corp. sold WSJS and WTQR to Radio Equity Partners of Norwalk, Connecticut, in a deal completed in April 1994 and worth in excess of $100 million. The Connecticut company wanted to expand into the Southeast, looking for the best stations possible.

After more than 20 years, Wake Forest University stopped airing its football and basketball games on WSJS, moving to the first of several stronger FM stations. Gene Overby, also WSJS sports director prior to his death in 1989, was play-by-play announcer for Wake Forest for 17 years.

In August 1998, WSML in Graham, North Carolina, formerly a gospel music station, began airing the same programming as WSJS most of the time. The move was made to improve WSJS' coverage in the eastern Triad, particularly at night when WSJS must adjust its signal to protect several clear-channel stations on nearby frequencies. Legendary Greensboro DJ Dusty Dunn joined the stations. WSJS program director Mike Fenley began a talk show on WSML which aired in the late morning, at the time WSJS was airing Dr. Laura. While WSJS aired Rush Limbaugh, WSML had Paul Harvey and religious programming. WSJS aired UNC football and basketball, while WSML carried N.C. State sports. Dunn left WSJS/WSML after a year because new station management wanted more of a focus on political talk.

WSML was the only area station airing Carolina Hurricanes hockey early in the 1998–99 season. WSJS had Carolina Panthers football and Charlotte Hornets basketball.

WSJS and WTQR were sold to Clear Channel Communications in 1997.

=== 2000s ===
When Clear Channel merged with AMFM, WSJS was sold to Infinity Broadcasting Corporation in 2000. The Infinity purchase meant WSJS dropped Paul Harvey and added Charles Osgood and The Dan Rather Report. CBS network newscasts replaced those from ABC Radio News.

WSJS carried the Winston-Salem Warthogs minor league baseball team for two seasons starting in 2003.

WSJS dropped Dr. Laura late in 2003, replacing her with Laura Ingraham in the late morning slot; Ingraham had been on WSJS late at night.

Beth Ann McBride was a producer and assistant continuity director in 2002 and 2003, and she became producer of the Don and Mike Show before returning to WSJS in December 2005 as program director and afternoon host, replacing Fenley.

On February 14, 2007, WSJS and its sister stations–simulcast partner WSML, and WMFR in High Point–were sold by CBS Radio to Raleigh-based Curtis Media Group. The move partnered WSJS with FM news/talk station WZTK, which covered both the Triad and Triangle.

This was the beginning of big changes at WSJS during 2007. McBride left her jobs as program director and host of the afternoon show "The Ride with McBride". News director Costner had already left the station for News 14 Carolina late in 2006. Ed Skurka, news director for Clear Channel's Greensboro-area stations, became WSJS/WMFR news anchor.

Also in 2007, Brian Freeman became news and programming director, as well as morning host, replacing Scott, who announced his retirement May 14. Smith Patterson and J. R. Snider remained a part of the show. Freeman left WSJS in December 2009 just before then Station Manager Tom Hamilton was stopped for drinking and driving while coming home from the annual North Carolina Wine Festival which his station promoted and ran.

Curtis Media Group announced that WSJS/WSML would no longer carry The Rush Limbaugh Show after December 31, 2009. The program moved to talk radio rival WPTI, owned by Clear Channel Communications, which also owns the firm that syndicated Limbaugh, Premiere Networks.

=== 2010s ===
WSJS' last logo as a news/talk station, from July 15, 2010, to August 31, 2017.

The WSJS simulcast on WSML ended on July 15, 2010, after WSML began carrying an all-sports format in tandem with WMFR and WCOG in Greensboro. WSJS realigned its programming on March 13, 2012, when a locally produced show hosted by Brad Krantz and Britt Whitmire and the syndicated Neal Boortz and Clark Howard shows moved to WSJS, as well as sister station WPTK in Raleigh, from WZTK (which changed formats). WSJS also increased its news coverage, including the launch of an hour-long noon newscast.

On March 4, 2013, WSJS reunited with its former sister station WXII-TV in a news sharing agreement. With the agreement, WXII 12 News at 6 PM started simulcasting on WSJS on March 4, followed by North Carolina News Network News. In April 2013, James Cooney became the Producer of The Triad's First News with J.R. Snider.

On January 18, 2016, WSJS added more sports programming. Clark Howard's show was cut to two hours, while Dave Ramsey was dropped along with More with Matt Clark, produced by the station's operations manager. The Raleigh-based David Glenn Show was moved to live in the early afternoon, after being delayed until evening. Scott Hamilton of the Winston-Salem Journal, whose show was already on WMFR, WSML and WCOG, was added in the afternoon. CBS Sports Radio was added in the evening. Morning show The Triad's First News with J.R. Snider remained, along with the simulcast of the WXII-TV 6:00 news, plus a 6:30 evening newscast.

In 2016, after nearly 50 years on Fifth Street, WSJS announced its studios would move to a reconverted factory building in Kernersville.

=== Switch to all-sports ===
The station ended its news/talk format on September 1, 2017, and changed to all-sports, including Fox Sports Radio programming, David Glenn's Raleigh-based sports show, and a locally produced afternoon show, One on One With The Schass with Kyle Schassburger. Schassburger was later replaced with The Drive with Josh Graham.

Outgoing morning host J.R. Snider said that "for the first time in 87 years, there will not be a live local morning show on WSJS". Concurrently, Curtis Media's existing sports stations — WSML, WMFR, and WCOG — began simulcasting with WSJS as the "WSJS Sports Network". WPCM in Burlington-Graham was also added to the simulcast all-sports network. In March 2021, Curtis Media sold WCOG to Winston-Salem-Greensboro Broadcasting Co., who relaunched it as an oldies sister station to WTOB and WWBG.

In December 2021, WSJS was sold to Stuart Epperson Jr's Truth Broadcasting Company for $625,000. Truth Broadcasting owns several other stations in the market, including WTRU and WPOL. The sale was consummated on March 1, 2022. On May 25, 2022, it was reported that WSJS would flip its format to talk and sports on June 6, 2022.

In January 2023, vandals destroyed two of four towers in WSJS' array. The AM signal was off the air, as well as the FM translator W268CG at 101.5 FM. The station's programming remained available through its three other FM translators. Truth Broadcasting and Stu Epperson Jr. may have benefited greatly from the felling of the radio transmission towers.

Prior to the attack, the station had filed a request with the FCC to move their transmitter location to a new site currently used by WPOL and WSMX. The move would see WSJS reduce power from 5,000 watts directional day and night to non-directional 1,700 watts day and 110 watts night.

== Translators ==
Call sign	Frequency	City of license	FID	ERP (W)	Class	Transmitter coordinates	FCC info
W229CH	93.7 FM	Greensboro, North Carolina	142881	250	D	36°3′18.5″N 79°54′45.1″W	LMS
W268CG	101.5 FM	Winston-Salem, North Carolina	87027	250	D	36°6′58.5″N 80°21′20.2″W	LMS
W276DS	103.1 FM	Winston-Salem, North Carolina	203185	250	D	36°14′19.5″N 80°11′33.2″W	LMS
W285EU	103.1 FM	High Point, North Carolina	142603	99	D	35°57′21.5″N 80°0′21.1″W	LMS
