= WFDD =

- Winston-Salem, North Carolina; United States
- Broadcast area: North Carolina and Virginia
- Frequency: 88.5 MHz (HD Radio)
- Branding: 88.5 WFDD, Public Radio for the Piedmont

Programming
- Format: Public Radio - News - Talk
- Subchannels: HD1: WFDD analog; HD2: Classical music; HD3: BBC World Service
- Affiliations: National Public Radio; Public Radio Exchange; American Public Media; BBC World Service

Ownership
- Owner: Wake Forest University

History
- First air date: April 19, 1948; 78 years ago (Sign-on in Wake Forest, moved to Winston-Salem in 1956.)
- Former call signs: WAKE (April 1948)
- Call sign meaning: Wake Forest Demon Deacons (nickname of Wake Forest University sports teams)

Technical information
- Licensing authority: FCC
- Facility ID: 70708
- Class: C1
- ERP: 60,000 watts
- HAAT: 285 meters (935 ft)
- Transmitter coordinates: 35°55′2.00″N 80°17′37.00″W
- Translator: 100.1 W261CK (Boone)

Links
- Public license information: Public file; LMS
- Webcast: Listen Live (FM/HD1); Listen Live (HD2); Listen Live (HD3)
- Website: wfdd.org

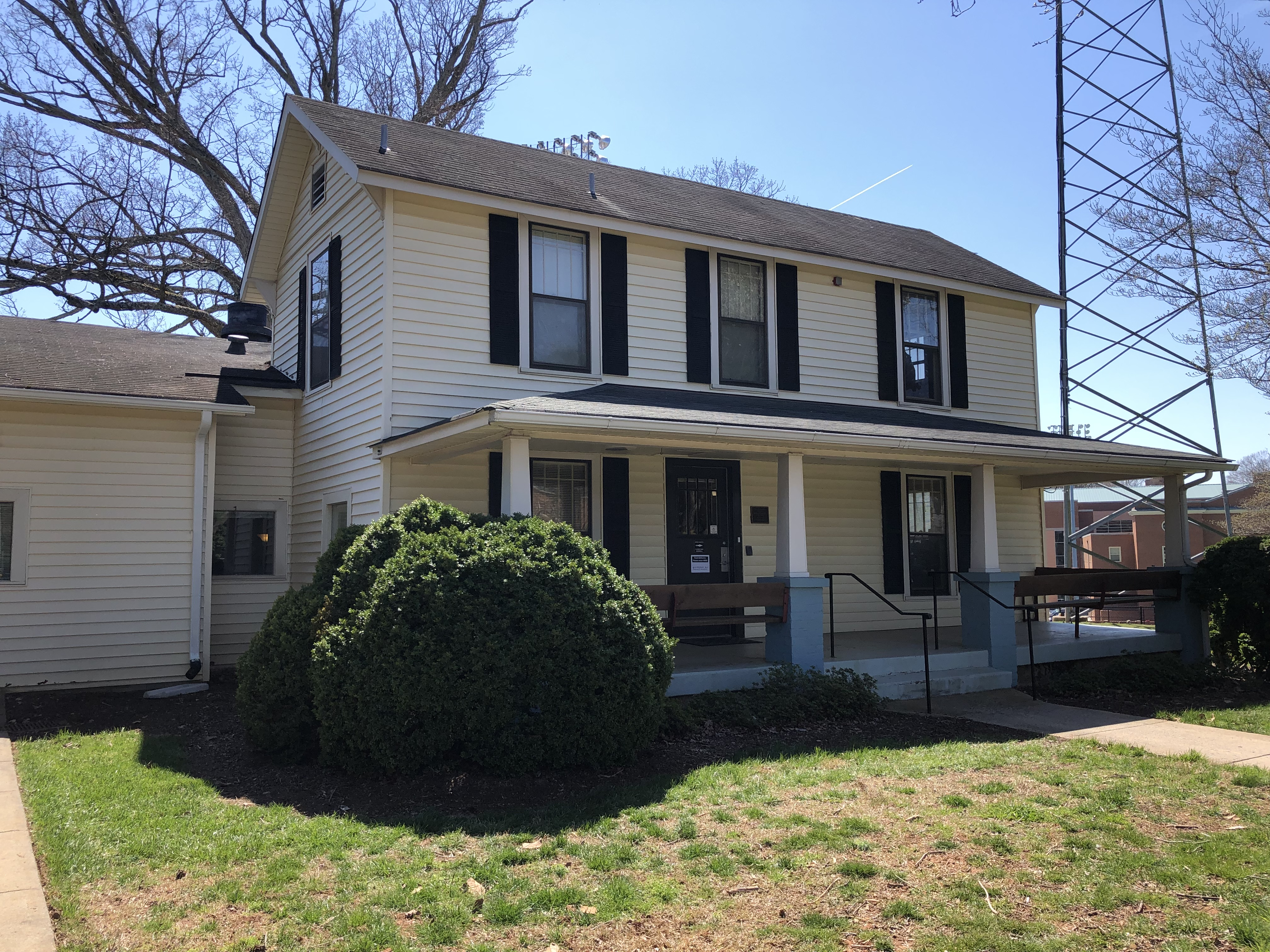
The WFDD building at Wake Forest University

WFDD (88.5 MHz) is a non-commercial, public radio station licensed to Winston-Salem, North Carolina. It is the National Public Radio (NPR) network affiliate for the Greensboro - Winston-Salem - High Point media market, also called the Piedmont Triad. Owned by Wake Forest University, WFDD serves 32 counties in Central North Carolina and South-Central Virginia. It holds periodic fundraisers on the air and accepts donations on its website.

WFDD is a Class C1 station. It has an effective radiated power (ERP) of 60,000 watts. The transmitter tower is on Old Evans Farm Road in Welcome, North Carolina. Programming is also heard on 10-watt FM translator, W261CK on 100.1 FM in Boone. WFDD broadcasts using HD Radio technology. Its HD2 digital subchannel plays classical music and on HD3, the BBC World Service is heard.

== Programming ==
On weekdays, WFDD carries news and talk programming from NPR and other public radio networks, with local news updates. The shows include Morning Edition, All Things Considered, Fresh Air, 1A, Here and Now, The World, On Point, Marketplace, and the BBC World Service. Late nights, it plays classical music programming.

On weekends, WFDD carries public radio specialty shows, including This American Life, The New Yorker Radio Hour, On The Media, The TED Radio Hour, The Moth Radio Hour, Latino USA, and Wait, Wait, Don't Tell Me. Weekend music programs include American Routes, Retro Cocktail Hour, and The Martha Bassett Show.

== History ==
WFDD logo used until mid-November 2019

=== Wake Forest College ===
WFDD has its roots in a station operated by students at what was then Wake Forest College. It was set up in a rooming house in the town of Wake Forest beginning in the fall of 1946. The experimental station was so popular students began asking for an official station. With the help of student fundraising, WAKE was fully licensed by 1948. The station uses as its official sign-on date April 19, 1948; 78 years ago.

After discovering that the WAKE letters were already in use, the station changed its call sign to WFDD, which stood for "Wake Forest Demon Deacons," the nickname of the university's sports teams. Since coverage of school sports was an important part of the station's programming, this seemed appropriate. Other programs included "Deaconlight Serenade", a student music program which included the part of the name of a Glenn Miller hit. This program remained on the air as "Deaconlight" until 1981. The WAKE call letters returned in the 1980s on a student-run AM station, which later became available on the Internet.

=== Move to Winston-Salem ===
After Wake Forest College moved to Winston-Salem, WFDD returned to the air with a 10-watt signal in 1961. The signal increased to 36,000 watts in 1967, the year the Corporation for Public Broadcasting began. WFDD became one of only 10 stations to have received federal funding from the new organization. The signal boost resulted from efforts to raise funds after WYFS stopped playing classical music in May 1966.

In 1958, Dr. Julian Burroughs, who had helped sign the station on and served as student station manager in the 1950-51 school year, became the station's first professional station manager, a post he held until 1981. His arrival began a transition to a more professional operation, culminating in 1961 when the station became a non-commercial educational radio station. On May 3, 1971, WFDD became a charter member of National Public Radio (NPR), the first affiliate of the network in the state. Burroughs added his knowledge to that of other station officials around the country to determine what NPR would become.

On May 5, 1989, WFDD lost its tower along Business Route 40 in Winston-Salem when severe storms struck the area. The station returned to the air with reduced power, but did not fully cover the market until a new tower was completed in Welcome, North Carolina, which was shared with WWGL. The tower was supposed to have taken 18 months to complete, but a station at 94.5 FM kept protesting that its signal would be affected. Once it was determined that would not be a problem, the tower was built and put into operation September 29, 1994.

=== Programming changes ===
For two years in the 1990s, WFDD aired Wake Forest football and basketball games. But some listeners complained about the interruption to the station's usual classical music and news programming.

For many years, WFDD, like many public FM radio stations, aired a mix of NPR programming and classical music. In 2005, WFDD began scheduling mostly news and talk programming from NPR, with no classical music during the day on most weekdays. With less classical music, many classical music listeners protested the change by ceasing their donations. At the same time, the station saw an influx of new donors who appreciated the news and discussion programming. The station added a 24-hour classical music station on its HD radio subcarrier. Some listeners can also receive classical stations 89.9 WDAV in Davidson or 89.7 WCPE in Raleigh.

In 2009, WFDD began Radio Camp, a week-long experience for middle schoolers. Students learn the basics of conducting interviews, how to operate professional sound editing software, and create their own stories to be broadcast. The camp is held at the WFDD studio on Wake Forest University's campus.

Until 2019, WFDD produced the syndicated show Across the Blue Ridge. The program specialized in bluegrass and folk music.

=== Other public radio stations ===
WFDD shares some of its coverage area with 91.5 WUNC-FM in Chapel Hill, a public radio station owned by the University of North Carolina. WUNC-FM is the primary NPR member station for the Research Triangle, including Raleigh and Durham. Its transmitter in Chatham County gives primary grade coverage to Greensboro and can also be heard in other parts of the Piedmont Triad. Some of WFDD's signal also goes into WUNC-FM's territory.

Meanwhile, 90.7 WFAE can be heard in the southern section of the Triad. WFAE is an NPR member station based in Charlotte with its 100,000 watt transmitter in Mecklenburg County. So WFAE and WFDD's signals overlap in Salisbury and Kannapolis.
