= WGBT =

WGBT may refer to:

- WGBT (FM), a radio station (91.3 FM) licensed to serve Tomahawk, Wisconsin, United States
- WPTI, a radio station (94.5 FM) licensed to serve Eden, North Carolina, United States, which held the call sign WGBT from 2003 to 2009
