= Mark Casey Milestone =

American artist

Mark Casey Milestone (born 1958) is an American folk artist.

== Early career ==
Born in Jacksonville, Florida, Milestone had an early calling to be an artist. “My artwork represents what I have done since I was a small child — making things.", At an early age, Milestone found an old moldy paint set and a large piece of plywood and from that he painted his first life-sized farmer, barefoot with green grass growing over his feet. His family did not support his ambition to become an artist and he dropped out of school in the 10th grade to support himself and learn his craft on his own. A self taught artist, Milestone was known early for whirligigs and robot sculptures he made since the age of 12. His art was described by the New York Times as childlike, "Mark Casey Milestone, a 35-year-old who makes life-size robots out of sheet metal and automotive accessories." The Carolina Arts referred to Milestone as a "highly imaginative painter and assemblage sculptor."

== Later career ==
Milestone now works primarily with oils on wood or canvas. Known as a symbolist influenced by Redon and Rousseau,. Milestone now focuses on naturalistic themes with subjects including powerful women and circus performers often set in mystic backgrounds inspired by dreams, emotions and imagination. According to the Winston-Salem Journal, Milestone has spent the last two decades refining his painting with more ambitious, poetic subjects The paintings are a story that viewer gets to finish on their own, never completed until the painting goes out into the world and finds a new home. Milestone has had twenty four exhibitions locally, regionally, nationally and internationally including several museums and a feature in The New Encyclopedia of Southern Culture: Folk Art.

Milestone currently works in a private studio in Winston-Salem, NC.
