= WDSL =

WDSL can refer to:

- Wireless Digital subscriber line
- WDSL (AM), an AM radio station located in Mocksville, North Carolina

Not to be confused with WSDL (Web Services Description Language).
