= HPF =

HPF may refer to:

- High-pass filter
- High Performance Fortran
- High-power field, in microscopy
- Hindustan Photo Films, an Indian film manufacturer
- Historic Preservation Fund, in the United States
- Hours post fertilization, a metric for developmental biology
- Human Proteome Folding Project
- Hyperpalatable food
- Hibernation Promoting Factor, a hibernation factor protein
