= WMKS =

- High Point, North Carolina; United States
- Broadcast area: Piedmont Triad
- Frequency: 100.3 MHz (HD Radio)
- Branding: Hits 100.3

Programming
- Format: Top 40 (CHR)
- Affiliations: Premiere Networks

Ownership
- Owner: iHeartMedia, Inc.; (iHM Licenses, LLC)
- Sister stations: WPTI, WMAG, WVBZ, WTQR

History
- First air date: June 1953; 72 years ago (as WNOS-FM)
- Former call signs: WNOS-FM (1953–1975); WGLD (1975–1985); WOJY (1985–1989); WWWB (1989–1994); WFXF (1994–1995); WHSL-FM (1995–2001); WUBZ (2001); WVBZ (2001–2014)
- Call sign meaning: "Kiss" (previous branding)

Technical information
- Licensing authority: FCC
- Facility ID: 74204
- Class: C
- ERP: 100,000 watts
- HAAT: 316 meters (1,037 ft)
- Transmitter coordinates: 35°58′9.4″N 79°49′28.1″W

Links
- Public license information: Public file; LMS
- Webcast: Listen Live
- Website: hitscarolina.iheart.com

WMKS (100.3 FM, "Hits 100.3"), is a top 40 (CHR) radio station licensed to High Point, North Carolina, that serves the Piedmont Triad region, including Greensboro and Winston-Salem. The iHeartMedia, Inc. outlet broadcasts with an ERP of 100 kW. It has studio facilities and offices located on Pai Park in Greensboro, and a transmitter site is located south of Greensboro in unincorporated Guilford County.

== History ==
=== Early years ===
This station signed on the air in June 1953 as WNOS-FM. In October 1975, Bernie Mann bought WNOS and WNOS-FM. He changed the FM station's letters to WGLD and the format to beautiful music, also increasing the power to 100,000 watts and building a new 400-foot tower.

In 1985, the WGLD letters and format moved to 1320 AM and the station became WOJY "Joy 100", a satellite MOR station. In 1989, WOJY changed to soft adult contemporary with the new name WWWB "B-100". For a year starting on September 19, 1994, the station was WFXF "100.3 the Fox", a hit-oriented classic rock station focusing on the 70s and listeners 35 to 45, with some songs no one else was playing. Then the station became WHSL "Whistle 100", playing country music. In 1999, WHSL became one of the first country music stations to air John Boy and Billy, which had previously been designed for classic rock stations. Around New Year's Day 2001, the station took over the rock format previously heard on WXRA, calling itself WVBZ "100.3 the Buzzard", keeping John Boy and Billy. This arrangement lasted until early 2009, when it changed its moniker to "The Buzz" and shifted its music towards active rock.

=== 100.3 KISS-FM ===
Logo used as 100.3 KISS FM from January 2014 to November 2020

The Buzz moved to 105.7 FM on January 1, 2014, at 5p.m., taking the spot of sister station WMKS. WVBZ adopted the Top 40 format of its predecessor, and later rebranded as "100.3 KISS-FM." On January 3, 2014, the call letters switched to WMKS.

Prior to 2018, WMKS aired Fred & Angi from WKSC-FM in Chicago in the morning. The station had no morning DJs until adding Ace and TJ May 28, 2019.

=== Hits 100.3 ===
On October 29, 2020, WMKS dropped the "Kiss-FM" branding and began promoting "The New Sound of 100.3" coming on November 2, at Noon. At said time, after playing "This Is What You Came For" by Calvin Harris, WMKS rebranded as "Hits 100.3", promising to be commercial free on weekends. The first song on "Hits" was "What's Poppin" by Jack Harlow. The new format leans rhythmic, and the new station claimed that listeners of hip hop-formatted 102 Jamz like only one in four songs played on that station, and that Mainstream CHR-formatted WKZL has too many commercials.
