= WQFS =

Student radio station in North Carolina

- Greensboro, North Carolina; United States
- Broadcast area: Triad
- Frequency: 90.9 MHz
- Branding: Your Only Alternative

Programming
- Format: Variety

Ownership
- Owner: Guilford College

History
- First air date: January 6, 1970
- Call sign meaning: W Quaker Friends School

Technical information
- Licensing authority: FCC
- Facility ID: 68233
- Class: A
- ERP: 1,900 watts
- HAAT: 61.0 meters
- Transmitter coordinates: 36°5′39.00″N 79°53′21.00″W

Links
- Public license information: Public file; LMS
- Website: www.wqfs.org

WQFS (90.9 FM) is Guilford College's student-run radio station, with both students and members of the community serving as disk jockeys. Broadcasting in a variety format, it serves Greensboro, North Carolina and the greater Piedmont Triad area. It is also broadcast on the internet via streaming audio at TuneIn. WQFS ranked 6th among college radio stations in 2016, according to The Princeton Review.

== History ==
The station started as a student club, The Fine Music Broadcasting Society, in 1965. Guilford College obtained a license from the FCC on October 26, 1966, and, once it had the necessary equipment and funds, WQFS began a daily broadcast schedule on January 6, 1970, broadcasting in an adult contemporary or middle of the road format.
