= WMAG =

- High Point, North Carolina; United States
- Broadcast area: Piedmont Triad
- Frequency: 99.5 MHz (HD Radio)
- Branding: Mix 99.5

Programming
- Format: Adult contemporary
- Affiliations: Premiere Networks

Ownership
- Owner: iHeartMedia, Inc.; (iHM Licenses, LLC)
- Sister stations: WPTI; WMKS; WTQR; WVBZ

History
- First air date: 1946 (as WMFR-FM at 97.7)
- Former call signs: WMFR-FM (1946–1982)
- Former frequencies: 97.7 MHz (1946–1947)
- Call sign meaning: "Magic" (former branding)

Technical information
- Licensing authority: FCC
- Facility ID: 73258
- Class: C
- ERP: 100,000 watts
- HAAT: 456 meters (1,496 ft)
- Transmitter coordinates: 35°52′13.5″N 79°50′24.1″W

Links
- Public license information: Public file; LMS
- Webcast: Listen live (via iHeartRadio)
- Website: mix995triad.iheart.com

WMAG (99.5 FM) is a commercial radio station licensed to High Point, North Carolina, and serving the Piedmont Triad, including Greensboro and Winston-Salem. It is owned by iHeartMedia and it broadcasts an adult contemporary radio format, switching to Christmas music for much of November and December. In the evening, WMAG carries the nationally syndicated Delilah call-in and dedication show. The studios and offices are on Pai Park in Greensboro.

WMAG is a Class C station. It has an effective radiated power (ERP) of 100,000 watts, the maximum for most stations. The transmitter tower is off Davis County Road in Randleman. The signal provides at least secondary coverage as far east as Raleigh, as far north as Martinsville and as far south as the Charlotte suburbs.

== History ==
=== WMFR-FM ===
The station signed on the air in 1946 as WMFR-FM. It broadcast at 97.7 MHz as a sister station of WMFR 1230 AM. In 1947, WMFR-FM moved to 99.5 MHz; by the 1960s, it had increased its power to 8,000 watts.

The two stations simulcast their programming until the late 1960s. By that time, the Federal Communications Commission was encouraging FM stations in larger communities to offer separate programming from their co-owned AM counterparts. WMFR-FM switched to beautiful music. It played automated quarter-hour sweeps of instrumental music. The playlist was mostly soft cover versions of popular adult songs, along with Broadway and Hollywood show tunes.

=== WMAG ===
Logo as "99.5 WMAG"

In 1982, WMFR-FM was purchased by Voyager Communications. The facilities were upgraded and the station became WMAG "Magic 99.5" with an adult contemporary format. General manager George Francis said, "We looked at the market and saw a hole eight miles wide." During the 1980s and early 90s the station's competitors in the adult contemporary format were WWWB and WMQX. In later years, "Magic 99.5" began describing its music as "soft rock" and dropped the "Magic" handle in favor of just the call sign.

Voyager Broadcasting sold WMAG in the early 1990s to what would become AMFM Broadcasting. In 1999, San Antonio-based Clear Channel Communications acquired AMFM Broadcasting, including WMAG. Its original transmitter site, still used by 1230 WMFR, is visible atop The Radio Building on Main St. in downtown High Point.

=== Changes in staff ===
At the end of 2009, Bill Flynn ended a 26-year career as WMAG morning host when he moved to 94.5 WPTI. After the local classic hits station WTHZ "Majic 94.1" switched to a contemporary Christian format, WMAG added more 1970s and 1980s music in effort to gain some of the former WTHZ listeners.

Another local radio personality, Rod Davis, lost his job as the co-host on WMAG's morning show, on Wednesday October 26, 2011. As a cost-cutting move, Clear Channel Communications announced that it had dismissed some on-air and off-air staff, within that same week, throughout the United States.

On December 18, 2020, WMAG rebranded as "Mix 99.5". In November and December, Mix 99.5 calls itself "The Triad's Christmas Station" playing all Christmas music through Christmas Day.
