= WYZD =

- Dobson, North Carolina; United States
- Broadcast area: Piedmont Triad
- Frequency: 1560 kHz

Programming
- Format: Christian Radio

Ownership
- Owner: Gospel Broadcasting, Inc.

History
- First air date: 1977

Technical information
- Licensing authority: FCC
- Facility ID: 17047
- Class: D
- Power: 4,200 watts day 510 watts critical hours
- Transmitter coordinates: 36°23′33.00″N 80°44′0.00″W
- Translator: 95.3 W237FG (Dobson)

Links
- Public license information: Public file; LMS
- Website: gbiradio.org/wyzd.htm

WYZD (1560 AM) is a Christian radio station licensed to Dobson, North Carolina, United States. The station serves the Piedmont Triad area. The station is owned by Gospel Broadcasting, Inc.
