= Angie Ward =

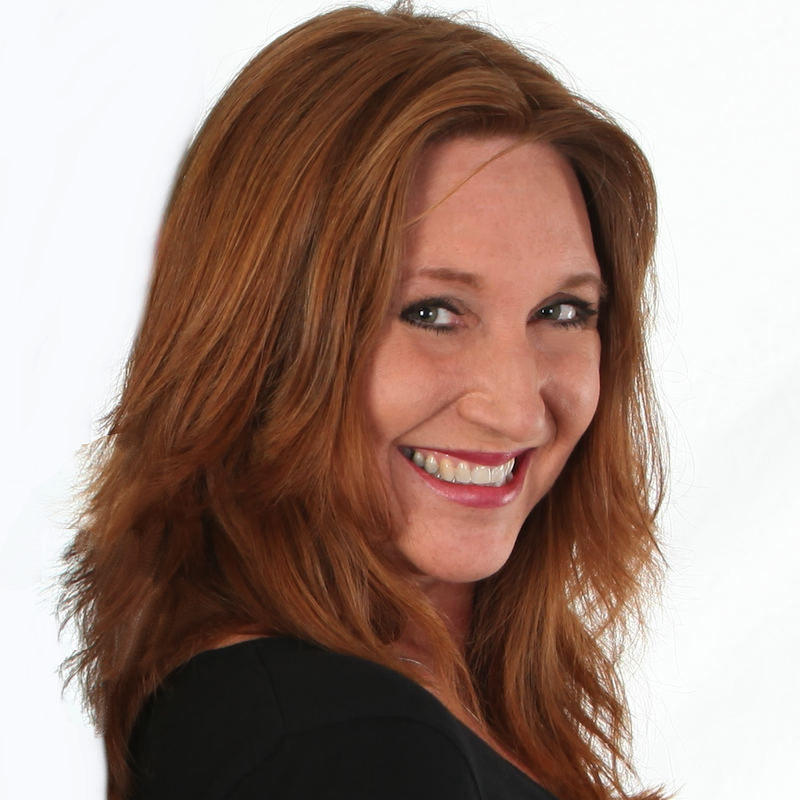
- Born: Angela Marie Ward; June 12, 1968 (age 58); La Jolla, California
- Education: Auburn University
- Occupations: Radio personality, television host, blogger, music director, radio programmer
- Years active: 1992–present
- Spouse: Tim Satterfield (2001–present)
- Website: angiewardonline.com

Angie Ward (born June 12, 1968) is a CMA and ACM award-winning media personality and Class of 2021 inductee into the Country Radio Hall Of Fame. She is the Music Director at IHeartMedia radio station WUBL, known as 94.9 The Bull in Atlanta, GA. She can be heard daily on WUBL (Atlanta), WPGB (Pittsburgh), KVET (Austin), WNCB (Raleigh), WTQR (Greensboro), WQIK (Jacksonville). and WKSF (Asheville). She has more than 35 years of experience both on and off the air in radio broadcasting & television and can also be heard weekly on 45 other Country_radio stations across the United States, and streamed on desktop or mobile devices via the iHeartRadio Country channel.

== Early life ==
Angie Ward was born in La Jolla, California.

Ward grew up on a horse farm in Alpharetta, GA. Her parents Marvin and Audrey, and sister Amanda owned and operate Ward Stables located north of Atlanta, one of the top American Saddlebred Training facilities in the Southeastern United States. Father Marvin Ward is a member of the American Saddlebred Horse Association of Georgia's Hall of Fame.

She graduated from Colonial Hills Christian School in 1986, Jefferson State Community College in 1990, and Auburn University in 1992.

== Career ==
Ward's broadcasting career began at Auburn University, in 1990 at WEGL where she was the first woman at Auburn University to call baseball play-by-play there, and was granted access to locker room interviews breaking down gender bias prevalent then.

In 1991, Ward accepted her first job at commercial station WZLM in Alexander City, Alabama doing nights and serving as the stations newscaster. That same year she helped launch commercial station Mix 96.7 WMXA where she co-hosted morning drive.

In 1992, she joined WSTH/Columbus, GA as an on-air personality and was quickly named program director, a rare accomplishment for women in the early ‘90s.

In 1993, she moved to WNEU in High Point, NC as Program Director, before landing the prime midday airshift at legendary WTQR/Greensboro in 1995 where she's continued to be heard daily for 34 years. She also handled Music Director & APD roles.

iHeartMedia transferred Ward to the Atlanta GA market in 2012 as WUBL midday host, Assistant Program Director, & Music Director where she has consistently been the top-rated Country personality.

Ward produces one of the biggest Country artist discovery programs in the nation called Backyard Country, a show that launched the careers of Thomas Rhett, Florida Georgia Line, Kane Brown, and others.

She maintains a social media following of over 250,000 across her platforms.

== Awards and nominations ==
Year	Association	Category	Result
2026	ACM - Major Market	Major Market Personality of the Year	Nominated
2026	CRS-Country Aircheck Award	Assistant Program Director/Music Director	Nominated
2025	CRS-Country Aircheck Award	Large Market Personality of the Year	Won
2024	ACM - Major Market	Major Market Personality of the Year	Won
2024	CRS-Country Aircheck Award	Major Market Assistant Program Director/Music Director	Won
2023	CMA - National	Daily Broadcast Personality of the Year	Won
2022	CRS-Country Aircheck Award	National Daily Personality of the Year	Won
2022	CRS-Country Aircheck Award	Major Market Assistant Program Director/Music Director	Won
2022	CMA - National	Daily Broadcast Personality of the Year	Nominated
2021	CRS-Country Aircheck Award	Major Market Personality of the Year	Won
2020	CMA - Major Market	Broadcast Personality of the Year	Nominated
2019	CRS-Country Aircheck Award	Major Market Personality of the Year	Won
2015	CRS-Country Aircheck Award	Music Director of the Year Award	Won
2013	CMA - Large Market	Broadcast Personality of the Year	Nominated
2013	CRS-Country Aircheck Award	Music Director of the Year Award	Won
2012	CMA - Large Market	Broadcast Personality of the Year	Nominated
2012	CRS-Country Aircheck Award	Music Director of the Year	Won
2011	CMA - Large Market	Broadcast Personality of the Year	Nominated
2010	ACM - Large Market	Broadcast Personality of the Year	Nominated
2010	Bowman Gray Stadium- Bush/Call	Memorial Community Service	Won
2010	United Professional Horseman's Association	Ambassador of the Year	Won
2009	CMA - Large Market	Broadcast Personality of the Year	Nominated
2009	ACM - Large Market	Broadcast Personality of the Year	Nominated
2003	R&R - Country Music	Director of the Year	Nominated
2002	CMA - Large Market	Station of the Year (WTQR)	Won
2002	R&R - Country Music	Music Director of the Year	Nominated
2001	CRB - Large Market	Broadcast personality of the Year	Won
2000	CMA - Large Market	Broadcast personality of the Year	Won
2000	Marconi - Large Market	Station of the Year (WTQR)	Won
1999	CMA - Large Market	Broadcast Personality of the Year	Nominated
1998	CMA - Large Market	Station of the Year (WTQR)	Won

== Philanthropy ==
Angie Ward is very active in the non-profit community, volunteering or helping to raise money for many national and local charities.

Ward formed her own team called Angie Ward's Q Boob Crew to participate in the annual Susan G Komen Race for the Cure held annually in Winston-Salem, North Carolina. Over the years the team raised thousands of dollars to fight Breast cancer in memory of her late friend & cancer victim Liz.

For over 25 years Ward has participated in radiothons and events for St. Jude Children's Research Hospital in Memphis Tennessee that have raised in excess of 10 Million dollars.

During her years in Atlanta she has continued to focus on children's health organizations by supporting Pediatric Brain Tumor Foundation, CURE Childhood Cancer, and Children's Healthcare of Atlanta.

Ward was an early supporter, contributor and volunteer at the Victory Junction Gang Camp located in Randleman, North Carolina. The camp was started by her friend NASCAR driver Kyle Petty & his wife Patty following the death of their son Adam Petty in an accident in 2000. It serves terminally-ill children.

She is also involved with March of Dimes, the Make-A-Wish Foundation, the American Red Cross, Second Harvest Food Bank, and Ronald McDonald House.

== Personal life ==
Ward married husband Tim Satterfield on October 27, 2001, at the Viva Las Vegas Wedding Chapel in Las Vegas, Nevada. She has one Daughter: Cierra Noelle born on December 25, 1989. Daughter Cierra married Nicholas Carter Davant in Wilmington, North Carolina on June 5, 2007. She has one Grandson: Rydan Carter Davant born in Greensboro, North Carolina on September 2, 2007. She has one Granddaughter: Emery Monroe Davant born in Cumming, Georgia on February 8, 2015.

== See also ==
- WUBL
- KVET
- WTQR
- WESC-FM
- iHeartRadio
