= WLOE =

Radio station in Eden, North Carolina

- WLOE: Eden, North Carolina WMYN: Mayodan, North Carolina; United States
- Broadcast area: Piedmont Triad (Greensboro/Winston-Salem/High Point)
- Frequencies: WLOE: 1490 kHz; WMYN: 1420 kHz

Programming
- Format: News/Talk; Christian radio
- Affiliations: Salem Radio Network

Ownership
- Owner: Stuart Epperson, Jr. and Stuart Epperson, Sr.; (Truth Broadcasting Corporation)

History
- First air date: WLOE: December 20, 1946; WMYN: July 15, 1957
- Call sign meaning: WLOE: Wonderful Land Of Eden; WMYN: W MayYodaN

Technical information
- Licensing authority: FCC
- Facility ID: 40793
- Class: C
- Power: WLOE: 1,000 watts WMYN: 1000 watts (days)/68 watts (nights)
- Transmitter coordinates: 36°30′21.00″N 79°46′18.00″W
- Translators: WLOE: (92.5 MHz) W223DJ (Eden); WMYN: (97.5 MHz) W248DG (Mayodan)

Links
- Public license information: Public file; LMS
- Webcast: www.RockinghamCountyRadio.com
- Website: wloewmyn.com

WLOE (1490 kHz) and WMYN (1420 kHz) are two AM radio stations simulcasting a News/Talk and Christian radio format. WLOE is licensed to Eden, North Carolina and WMYN is licensed to nearby Mayodan. The stations are owned by Stuart Epperson, Jr. and Stuart Epperson, Sr., through licensee Truth Broadcasting Corporation, and serve the Piedmont Triad of North Carolina, including the Greensboro/Winston-Salem/High Point media market.

== History ==
WLOE signed on the air on December 26, 1946. The call sign WLOE was chosen to highlight the phrase "Wonderful Land Of Eden", which was a 19th-century historical description of the area coined by William Byrd during his exploration of the region. Use of the term pre-dates the establishment of the current city of Eden, as WLOE was originally licensed to the town of Leaksville, North Carolina, which along with the towns of Draper and Spray merged into Eden in 1967.

The WLOE studios and transmitter were originally located just outside Leaksville, in the town of Spray, North Carolina, "...on the busy Boulevard..." as it was often referred to on the air. FM service was added in 1949 on FM channel 224(A) 92.7 MHz, with a power of 820 watts . The call sign of the FM was originally WLOE-FM . The station changed its frequency to 94.5, which is now occupied by WPTI. WLOE-FM eventually changed its call sign to WEAF-FM. Mike Moore joined 1490 WLOE and WEAF-FM 94.5 as news director in 1972. The station was sold in 1972 by Doug Craddock, the original owner, to SOCOM Inc.

WMYN first signed on the air on July 15, 1957, originally broadcasting at 500 watts as a daytime-only station. Today, WLOE is 1,000 watts by day, powering down to 68 watts at night to avoid interfering with other stations on 1420 kHz.
