= WUAG =

- Greensboro, North Carolina; United States
- Broadcast area: Piedmont Triad
- Frequency: 103.1 MHz
- Branding: The Music 103

Programming
- Format: Variety

Ownership
- Owner: University of North Carolina at Greensboro

History
- First air date: 1964 (at 89.9)
- Former frequencies: 89.9 MHz (1965–1981); 106.1 MHz (1981–1989)

Technical information
- Licensing authority: FCC
- Facility ID: 68667
- Class: D
- ERP: 18 watts
- HAAT: 79 meters
- Transmitter coordinates: 36°3′51.00″N 79°48′37.00″W

Links
- Public license information: Public file; LMS
- Website: wuag.uncg.edu

WUAG (103.1 FM) is a radio station broadcasting a variety format. Licensed to Greensboro, North Carolina, United States, the station serves the Piedmont Triad area. The station is currently owned by the University of North Carolina at Greensboro.

== History ==
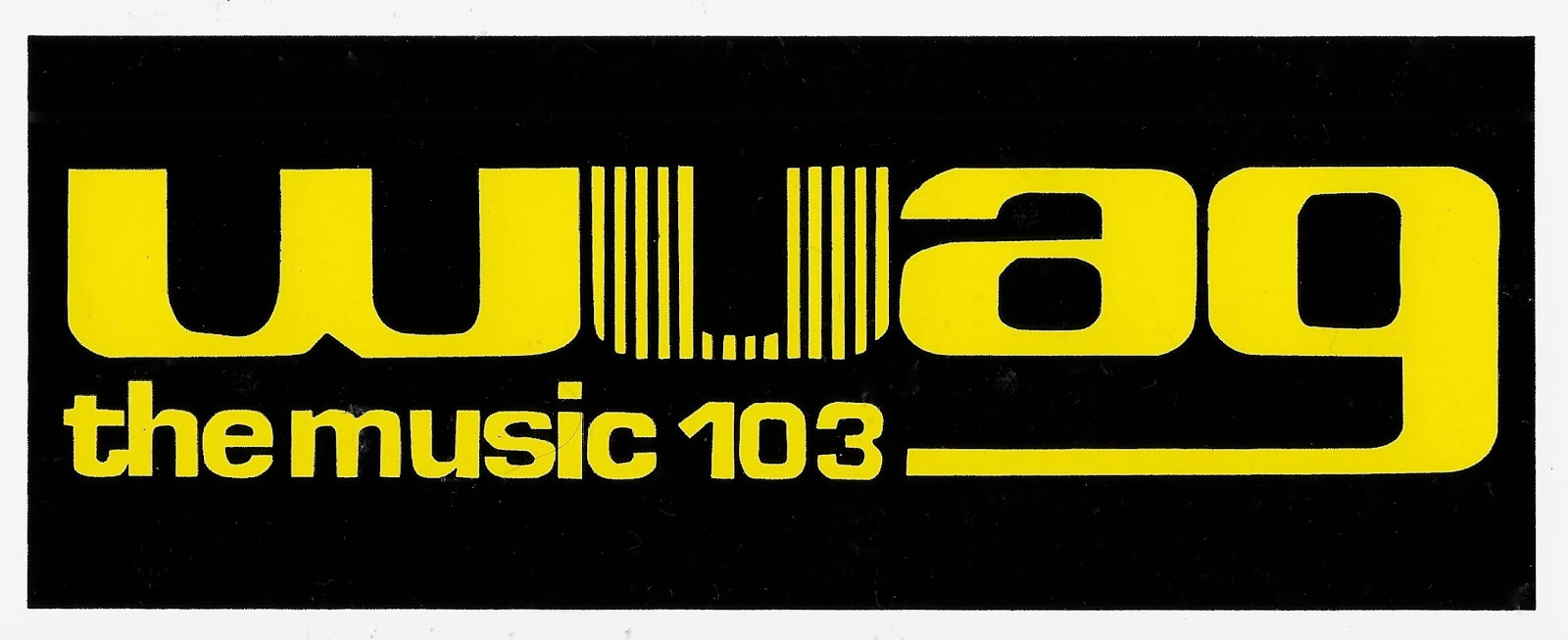
WUAG's logo circa late 1980s early 90s when it was known as The Music 103.

Since 1964 this college radio station has been through several changes. The station has changed location and frequency three times. First, it was 89.9 (a frequency that had been abandoned by Greensboro's Grimsley High School), then 106.1 in 1981, then by 1990 had changed to what it is today, 103.1 FM. WUAG currently broadcasts at 18 watts, reaching the entirety of Greensboro. The station was on the second floor of Elliott Hall (now the Elliott University Center) until 1984, when the station moved to the Taylor Theater building. Then, operations moved to the third floor of the Brown Building in 2011, where WUAG has a broadcasting booth, recording rooms, and offices. As of 2024, Taylor Phillips is the General Manager.

== Programming ==
The official format of WUAG is Progressive but with a philosophy of "willful eclecticism and minimal musical boundaries". The station broadcasts 24 hours a day, 7 days a week, with DJs and shows changing each semester. The station plays a constantly changing rotation of everything from Americana, punk, electronica, reggae, hip-hop, rock, jazz, local and world music. Since WUAG is primarily student-run it has to adapt each semester to the influx of new DJs who may have more of an interest in one type of music over the other. Examples of Specialty programming are the '80s shows and the Night Zoo, a top 40-leaning show that aired through the early-to-mid '90s.

In 2010, music director Matt Northrup said WUAG had 85 CDs in "heavy rotation", and 15 to 20 new recordings each week, introduced on Northrup's weekly show on Thursday afternoons. WUAG had 100 student DJs, who were told "Less talk, more rock" (though the musical genres varied) and to play eight cuts per hour from the CDs in rotation.

== Operations ==
The day-to-day operations of WUAG are led entirely by students, through a student executive board. The board is staffed with a general manager, office manager, news and sports director, music and productions director, and social media director. DJs are volunteers and consist of UNCG students and other community members.
