= WPIP =

- Winston-Salem, North Carolina; United States
- Broadcast area: Piedmont Triad
- Frequency: 880 kHz

Programming
- Format: Religious

Ownership
- Owner: Berean Christian School

History
- First air date: June 1, 1995; 30 years ago
- Call sign meaning: We're Praising In the Piedmont

Technical information
- Licensing authority: FCC
- Facility ID: 41508
- Class: D
- Power: 1,800 watts day only
- Transmitter coordinates: 36°2′38″N 80°10′55″W

Links
- Public license information: Public file; LMS
- Webcast: Listen live
- Website: wpip880am.org

WPIP (880 AM) is a radio station broadcasting a religious format. It is licensed to Winston-Salem, North Carolina, United States, and serves the Piedmont Triad area of North Carolina. The station, owned by Berean Christian School (North Carolina) which is part of Berean Baptist Church, broadcasts only during daytime hours to protect WHSQ of New York City, which is assigned the 880 AM clear channel frequency during the nighttime.
