= WDSL (AM) =

- Mocksville, North Carolina; United States
- Broadcast area: Lexington, North Carolina; Salisbury, North Carolina; Statesville, North Carolina
- Frequency: 1520 kHz
- Branding: WDSL 96.5 FM 1520 AM

Programming
- Format: Classic country/Bluegrass

Ownership
- Owner: WDSL Broadcasting
- Sister stations: WSIC

History
- First air date: January 1, 1964

Technical information
- Licensing authority: FCC
- Facility ID: 71354
- Class: D
- Power: 5,000 watts day 1,000 watts critical hours
- Transmitter coordinates: 35°52′50.00″N 80°32′26.00″W
- Translators: W243EC (96.5 MHz, Mocksville)

Links
- Public license information: Public file; LMS

WDSL (1520 AM) is a radio station licensed to Mocksville, North Carolina, United States. The station is owned by WDSL Broadcasting . The station format is Classic Country, Bluegrass and Gospel.
