= Hindustan Photo Films =

Indian film manufacturer

Hindustan Photo Films Manufacturing Company Limited (HPF) was an Indian-based public sector manufacturer of photographic films, cine films, X-ray films, graphic arts films, photographic paper, and chemistry. It was incorporated in 1960 It is based at Udhagamandalam, a hill station in Tamil Nadu. Their photographic films were sold under the name "Indu", which means "silver" in Sanskrit (silver halides are used in film).

Hindustan Photo Films Ltd, which employed over 714 employees as of 31 March 2012, was declared bankrupt by the Board for Industrial and Financial Reconstruction in 1996. In March 2013, a Rs 181 crore VRS package for employees of the ailing PSU Hindustan Photo Films based on notional pay scales of 2007. Its losses have mounted, from Rs 2,132,950,000,000 in 2014–15 to Rs 2,885,750,000,000 in 2016–17. After the decision of the Madras High Court in August 2016, the company was wound up and is undergoing liquidation.
