= WSIC =

Coordinates: 35°48′09″N 80°53′30″W

- Statesville, North Carolina; United States
- Frequency: 1400 kHz

Programming
- Format: Talk radio
- Affiliations: Fox News Radio; Compass Media Networks; Premiere Networks; Salem Radio Network; Carolina Panthers Radio Network

Ownership
- Owner: Justin Ckezepis; (Real Talk Studios, LLC.)

History
- First air date: May 3, 1947 (79 years ago)
- Call sign meaning: W Statesville, Iredell County

Technical information
- Licensing authority: FCC
- Facility ID: 503
- Class: C
- Power: 1,000 watts
- Translators: 100.7 W264CU (Statesville); 105.9 W290DK (Mooresville)

Links
- Public license information: Public file; LMS
- Website: wsicnews.com

WSIC (1400 AM) is a commercial radio station in Statesville, North Carolina. The station carries a talk radio format and is owned by Real Talk Studios, LLC. Justin Ckezepis is the president and CEO. WSIC-TV is broadcast over-the-web via the internet and social media (local programming only). WSIC airs live programs from a radio/TV hybrid studio at 1117 Radio Road in Statesville.

WSIC is powered at 1,000 watts, using a non-directional antenna. It is also heard on two FM translator stations: 100.7 W264CU in Statesville, and 105.9 W290DK in Mooresville.

== Programming ==
On weekdays, WSIC's schedule includes Pat Shannon, Todd Starnes, "Coast to Coast AM with George Noory" and "This Morning, America's First News with Gordon Deal." World and national news is provided by Fox News Radio. WSIC is an affiliate of the Carolina Panthers NFL Radio Network.

== History ==
On May 3, 1947, the station signed on the air. Its former FM sister station WSIC-FM, signed on the same day. (The FM station later changed its call sign to WFMX before being sold off in July 2006. It is now WVBZ, licensed to Clemmons, and is owned by iHeartMedia, Inc.)

WSIC-AM-FM were the first AM and FM co-owned radio stations to sign on simultaneously in the nation. They were owned by the Statesville Broadcasting Company. In the 1950s through the 1980s, WSIC had a full service middle of the road format, featuring popular adult music, news, sports and information. Some of WSIC's alumni include Ty Boyd and Harold Johnson. Johnson was a four-time local Emmy Award winner and noted Sports Director of WSOC-TV in Charlotte. Johnson later served as WSIC's morning host. His show on WSIC was a mix of politics and humor.

WSIC later added FM translator stations on 100.7 FM in Statesville and 105.9 FM in Mooresville.
