= WSML =

- Graham, North Carolina; United States
- Broadcast area: Piedmont Triad
- Frequency: 1200 kHz
- Branding: Maverick 95.1★94.3

Programming
- Format: Classic Country
- Affiliations: Compass Media Networks

Ownership
- Owner: Charles and Rebecca Marsh; (Alamance Media Partners, Inc.)

History
- First air date: December 2, 1967; 58 years ago
- Former call signs: WSML (1967–1981); WWOK (1981–1982)
- Former frequencies: 1190 kHz (1967–1991)

Technical information
- Licensing authority: FCC
- Facility ID: 740
- Class: B
- Power: 10,000 watts (day); 1,000 watts (night)
- Transmitter coordinates: 36°8′1.49″N 79°28′13.08″W
- Translators: 94.3 W232DT (Mebane); 95.1 W236BO (Burlington)

Links
- Public license information: Public file; LMS
- Webcast: Listen live
- Website: maverickradionc.com

WSML (1200 AM) is a commercial radio station in Graham, North Carolina. The license is held by Alamance Media Partners and it airs a classic country radio format branded as Maverick 95.1-94.3. The studios are on University Drive in Burlington.

By day, WSML is powered at 10,000 watts non-directional. Because 1200 AM is a clear channel frequency reserved for WOAI San Antonio, WSML must avoid interference at night. It reduces power to 1,000 watts and uses a directional antenna with a 4-tower array. Programming is also heard on two FM translators: 94.3 W232DT in Mebane and 95.1 W236BO in Burlington.

== History ==
WSML signed on the air on December 2, 1967. The station was a daytimer operating at 1190 AM, owned by Smiles of Graham, Inc. a division of Radio Smiles group of Raleigh. In its early years, the station had a top 40 format, but by 1970, it had become a country music station. By 1971, it reverted back to Top 40 format led by programmer Wilson Thomas, whose various creative promotions around the stations advertisers are still remembered by long-time residents of Burlington-Graham. During this era, the late Randy Kabrich, a long-time, prominent national programming consultant got his start at WSML in 1972.

This gave way to an album rock format by 1973. It switched to a blend of country and rock soon thereafter.

By 1975, WSML had integrated beautiful music into the format and cut back its country music programming. However, after a sale of the station to Acme Communications in 1976, it reverted to a full-time country music format.

In 1981, the station was sold to Graycasting, Inc. and became WWOK; a year later, Evans Communications Corporation took over the station and reinstated the WSML call sign. By this time, the station had added religious programming to its country music format. It became a full-time Christian radio station by 1987, after having been acquired by Gray Broadcasting Company (unrelated to Gray Television) two years earlier.

WSML moved to 1200 AM in 1991. Switching its frequency allowed the station to begin operating around the clock. By the 1990s, programming consisted of gospel music.

What had become Graycasting Media sold WSML to Clear Channel Communications in 1998. Clear Channel converted the station to a talk radio format, largely simulcasting sister station 600 WSJS in Winston-Salem. Adding 1200 AM helped fill a gap in WSJS' coverage of Greensboro and the eastern part of the Piedmont Triad (especially at night). There was some separate programming – predominantly NC State Wolfpack sports and Sunday morning programming.

After Clear Channel was forced to divest some of its stations to merge with AMFM Broadcasting, WSML and WSJS were sold in 2000 to Infinity Broadcasting Corporation, which also purchased 1230 WMFR in High Point from AMFM. CBS Radio (which Infinity became in 2005), in turn, sold the three stations to Curtis Media Group in 2007. Curtis dropped the WSJS simulcast from WSML on July 15, 2010, replacing it with sports radio programming.

Effective February 11, 2019, Curtis Media Group sold WSML and translators W232DT and W236BO to Alamance Media Partners, Inc. The price tag was $397,500. Alamance Media then switched WSML to a classic country format.

== Translators ==
Call sign	Frequency	City of license	FID	ERP (W)	Class	Transmitter coordinates	FCC info
W232DT	94.3 FM	Mebane, North Carolina	203181	100	D	36°3′56.5″N 79°13′45.1″W	LMS
W236BO	95.1 FM	Burlington, North Carolina	141747	250	D	36°5′51.5″N 79°29′10.1″W	LMS
