= High Point Friends School =

Quaker grade school in North Carolina, US

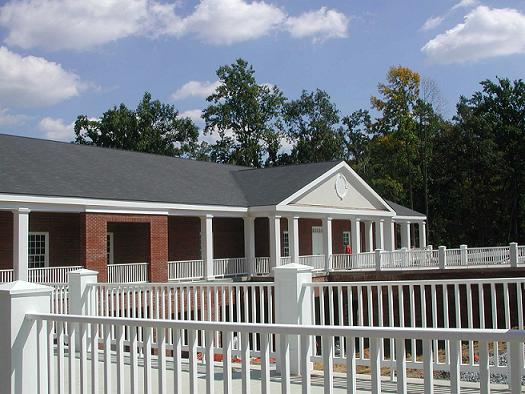
- Honbarrier Educational Center

Location
- 800-A Quaker Lane; High Point, (Guilford County), North Carolina 27262; United States; 35.962712°N 80.021516°W

Information
- Type: Private, Coeducational
- Religious affiliation: Quakers
- Founded: 1963
- Head of school: Rob Kelley
- Grades: Kindergarten–8
- Colors: Blue and White
- Athletics: Flag football, soccer, cross country running, basketball.
- Athletics conference: Independent Schools League
- Mascot: Falcon
- Team name: Falcons
- Accreditation: Southern Association of Colleges and Schools
- Tuition: $12,753.00 Annually
- Website: www.hpfs.org

High Point Friends School (HPFS), is a Quaker institution in High Point, North Carolina, United States, founded by members of High Point Monthly Meeting in 1963. It is an independent preschool, primary school, and lower secondary school, serving approximately 109 students, aged 12 months to 8th grade. The school offers standard learning experiences. The school's mission is "to foster academic excellence, spiritual values and social responsibility within the context of Quaker Christian principles".

== Facilities ==
The school is located on the grounds of High Point Friends Meeting at 800 Quaker Lane in central High Point. Its main building is the Honbarrier Educational Center, a brick, Georgian Revival-style building that includes a media center/library and classrooms for lower and middle school classes. The campus includes a gymnasium with two rock climbing walls named after the teacher Adam Worley, a theater stage, gardens tended by middle school students and a small soccer field.

According to the Greensboro News & Record, "The center is part of a four-phase project the school launched in 2007. So far, the project includes five classrooms, a gym, office space and performing arts space. Still left to be completed are four additional classrooms, a cafeteria/fellowship hall and a new library."

== Fund raising and community support ==
A significant contribution came in 2001 from Archie and Louise Honbarrier, who cited "a lifelong commitment to the Quaker faith and the desire to help children" that inspired their $1.25 million gift. Their donation was dedicated to "a school building on its property [to] expand its offerings to include first through fifth grades", with a projected cost of $3.1 million.

In 2007, school supporters also compiled and sold almost 400 copies of a Cooking With Friends cookbook, at $12.50 per book, "to help fund construction of a new addition to the school — a middle school complete with a gymnasium". The school expansion included "a new middle school facility, library, gymnasium, dining hall and community center".

In 2023–24, High Point Friends School received $124,646 in vouchers from the state of North Carolina. According to the Triad City Beat, "About 40 percent of the school’s 66 students are non-white and nearly a third of all students received vouchers this year... High Point Friends and many other private schools may be gaining more students of color through the voucher program." U.S. News reported in 2025 that High Point Friends School had 19.5% minority enrollment, and 80.5% white students.

The school hosts a yearly golf tournament to support its financial aid fund. In 2016, the tournament raised almost $20,000, with all proceeds going to the school’s fund to assist families in need. In addition, the school participates in events that involve students in causes that raise funds, such as the "Kids, Cans and Ca$h Challenge", which the school won for the sixth consecutive year in 2016.

== History ==
HPFS was established as a preschool and half-day kindergarten in 1963. In 1998, the school expanded to include grades 1 and 2. Groundbreaking took place in 2002 for the new Honbarrier Educational Center, to house all functions of the lower school, up to the middle school level. The school celebrated its 40-year anniversary in 2003.

Grade six was added in 2006. In 2007, the school raised funds to expand and include a middle school, through grade 8. In February 2009, High Point dedicated its new 3 million dollar gymnasium, 15,180-square-foot center, as the "Kingey Center", named for former Pastor David Kingrey and his wife, Carol. The Center "houses a full-sized basketball court, a rock-climbing wall, seating capacity of 300, a stage, five offices, one classroom and locker rooms".

In 2010 the school opened Louise Honbarrier Field on Council Street behind the school, benefiting from a collaboration with the city parks and recreation department. It is an elementary size regulation field.

In December 2014, the school held a ribbon-cutting event with the Chamber of Commerce to celebrate the opening of the new $2.6 million campus addition, Charity Hall. It includes two new classrooms, as well as a media center, technology center, Middle School Commons area and dining hall.

High Point Friends School earned accreditation in 2009 from the Southern Association of Independent Schools and the Southern Association of Colleges and Schools.
