= WPTI =

- Eden, North Carolina; United States
- Broadcast area: Piedmont Triad
- Frequency: 94.5 MHz (HD Radio)
- Branding: 94.5 WPTI

Programming
- Format: Talk radio
- Network: Fox News Radio
- Affiliations: Compass Media Networks; Premiere Networks; WGHP

Ownership
- Owner: iHeartMedia, Inc.; (iHM Licenses, LLC)
- Sister stations: WMAG, WMKS, WTQR, WVBZ

History
- First air date: March 20, 1949
- Former call signs: WLOE-FM (1949–1968); WEAF (1968–1980); WSRQ (1980–1984); WWWI (1984–1986); WKLM (1986–1987); WWMY (1987–1991); WMKG (1991–1992); WNEU (1992–1994); WXRA (1994–2001); WWCC (2001–2003); WGBT (2003–2009)
- Call sign meaning: Piedmont Triad (region served); International (IATA airport code)

Technical information
- Facility ID: 55754
- Class: C1
- ERP: 100,000 watts
- HAAT: 299 meters (981 ft)
- Transmitter coordinates: 36°20′48″N 79°54′30″W

Links
- Webcast: Listen live (via iHeartRadio)
- Website: 945wpti.iheart.com

WPTI (94.5 FM) is a commercial radio station, owned by iHeartMedia, licensed to Eden, North Carolina, and serving the Piedmont Triad, including the Greensboro–Winston-Salem–High Point media market. The station broadcasts a talk radio format; its studios and offices are located on Pai Park near Interstate 40 in Greensboro.

WPTI has an effective radiated power (ERP) of 100,000 watts, the current maximum for FM stations. The signal provides at least secondary coverage from the southern suburbs of Roanoke to the western suburbs of Raleigh-Durham. The transmitter is located further north than most of the major Triad stations, allowing much of Southside Virginia (Martinsville, Danville) to get a city-grade signal. The tower is on Lowe Road in Madison. WPTI also broadcasts using HD Radio technology.

== History ==
=== Beautiful music and country ===
On March 20, 1949, the station first signed on the air. The original call sign was WLOE-FM, simulcast with its sister station WLOE. In 1968 the station switched call letters to WEAF as a beautiful music outlet, programmed separately from the AM station. WEAF played quarter hour sweeps of mostly instrumental cover versions of popular songs as well as Broadway and Hollywood show tunes. It later took the call letters WSRQ.

In 1984, the station increased power to 100,000 watts, relocated its studios to Greensboro, and switched to country music as WWWI "I-95," competing against the market's entrenched and top-rated country outlet, WTQR. Later the name was changed to "I-94.5" to help listeners more easily find the station during the time that digital tuners were replacing traditional analog receivers.

In 1986 the call letters were switched to WKLM "Classy 94.5" when the station returned to beautiful music. Later the name changed to WWMY "My 94.5", though the format remained the same.

=== Soft AC and country ===
WWMY switched to Soft Adult Contemporary music in 1990, later changing to the new call letters WMKG and the name "Magic Lite" when WMAG began providing the station's programming.

In 1992, WMKG became WNEU "New Country 94.5", later changing its name to "Cat Country".

"La Preciosa" logo

=== Alternative rock, top 40 and regional Mexican ===
The purchase of WNEU by Radio Equity Partners was announced in July 1994 and it was believed the station would become the "rocking country cousin" to WTQR. On September 22, 1994, the station became WXRA "94.5 the Rock Alternative", playing modern rock from the 80s and 90s for listeners 18 to 34. On August 24, 1998, the station began playing a mix of old and new rock and called itself "The Rock Station", with Bob and Tom in the morning. Around New Year's Day, 2001, WXRA's format moved to 100.3 FM, with 94.5 FM becoming WWCC, a classic-leaning country music station. Ratings for this format were poor. On February 24, 2003, WWCC became WGBT, and flipped to a Rhythmic Top 40 format as "94.5 The Beat."

On February 16, 2006, at 5 p.m., after playing "Don't Forget About Us" by Mariah Carey, WGBT switched to a Spanish-language classic hits format as "La Preciosa." The station played Regional Mexican music from the 70s, 80s and 90s. As such, WGBT became The Triad's first FM Spanish-language radio station (and the second in North Carolina). This made the fourth distinctly different radio format in five years to be broadcast on the 94.5 frequency in the Greensboro market.

=== Talk radio ===
At the end of 2009, the Curtis Media Group announced that its WSJS/WSML news talk simulcast would no longer carry The Rush Limbaugh Show. On December 31, 2009, WGBT ended its Regional Mexican format, becoming talk station "Rush Radio 94.5" under the new call sign WPTI. The station aired weekend-long continuous replays of The Rush Limbaugh Week in Review through New Year's weekend. The Glenn Beck Program and a local show called The Morning Rush hosted by Bill Flynn and Pamela Furr debuted January 4. On July 26, 2010, WPTI added the Sean Hannity Show to its schedule.

Following controversial comments made by Rush Limbaugh regarding Sandra Fluke, WPTI was asked by the university not to promote the Tar Heel Sports Network during The Rush Limbaugh Show.

In November 2010, the station canceled The Morning Rush with Flynn and Pamela Furr (although Furr continued anchoring news for both WPTI and WRDU). After Christmas 2010, Dmitri Vassilaros began hosting the morning show. In 2011, WPTI replaced Vassilaros with K.C. O'Dea.

On May 24, 2013, WPTI dropped its "Rush Radio 94.5" branding, switching to "94.5 WPTI".

== Programming ==
K.C. O'Dea hosts WPTI's morning show; the remainder of the schedule is nationally syndicated talk shows, most of them from Premiere Networks. WPTI is the Triad's FM affiliate of the Tar Heel Sports Network, which broadcasts North Carolina Tar Heels football and basketball games.
