= Twin City Sentinel =

Afternoon newspaper published in Winston-Salem, North Carolina

The Twin City Sentinel was the name of the afternoon newspaper published in Winston-Salem, North Carolina. The Sentinel's masthead was dropped in 1985 when operations were absorbed into its sister paper, the morning Winston-Salem Journal.

Twin City derived from the fact that Winston and Salem began as separate cities.

One of the Sentinel's most popular columns was "Ask SAM," a forum for readers to submit questions. "Ask SAM" debuted in 1966. Bill Williams, the first "Sam," answered readers' questions for over two decades.

When the Sentinel quit publishing, the column was moved over to the Journal. David Watson took over the column when it began appearing in the Journal in 1985, and the acronym SAM, which originally stood for "Sentinel Answer Man," was changed to "Straight-Answer Man."

Watson continued writing the column until his death in March 2000. Journal editor Ronda Bumgardner picked up the column, and the acronym was changed again to "Straight-Answer Ma'am."

Deborah Sykes, a 25-year-old copy editor at The Sentinel, was raped, sodomized, and stabbed to death in a public park a few blocks from the newspaper's offices on the morning of August 10, 1984. Darryl Hunt was convicted of the crime, but cleared in 2004 on DNA evidence.
