= WKZL =

Coordinates: 36.276°N 79.941°W

- Winston-Salem, North Carolina; United States
- Broadcast area: Greensboro / Winston-Salem / High Point
- Frequency: 107.5 MHz
- Branding: 1075 KZL

Programming
- Format: Top 40 (CHR)

Ownership
- Owner: Dick Broadcasting; (Dick Broadcasting Company, Inc. of Tennessee)
- Sister stations: WKRR

History
- First air date: 1958 (as WYFS)
- Former call signs: WYFS (1958–1966); WAAA-FM (1966–1972); WSGH (1972–1975)

Technical information
- Licensing authority: FCC
- Facility ID: 16891
- Class: C
- ERP: 100,000 watts
- HAAT: 303 meters (994 feet)

Links
- Public license information: Public file; LMS
- Webcast: Listen live
- Website: 1075kzl.com

WKZL ("1075 KZL") is a Top 40 (CHR) station licensed to Winston-Salem, North Carolina and serves the Piedmont Triad area, which also includes Greensboro and High Point. The outlet, which is owned by Dick Broadcasting, operates at 107.5 MHz with an ERP of 100 kW. It has studio facilities and offices in downtown Greensboro alongside its sister station WKRR, and a transmitter site is near Stokesdale, North Carolina.

== History ==
In 1958, WYFS became the first Winston-Salem station to play classical music, also playing religious music and modern jazz. The area lost its only classical music station in May 1966 when the station became WAAA-FM, airing the soul music of WAAA, and WFDD took over classical music.

WAAA-FM was sold to Golden Circle Broadcasting Corp. in 1971.

The station had the call letters WSGH (standing for Winston-Salem / Greensboro / High Point) during the early 1970s when its format was easy listening.

The station began stereo broadcasts in January 1975 and changed its call letters to WKZL. In 1976, WKZL moved from a 285-foot tower on Indiana Avenue to a 499-foot tower and doubled its power to 100,000 watts.

For a short period of time in the mid-1970s the station featured an eclectic blend of pop, rock and progressive rock selected at random by the hosts. DJs on the air from 1975 to 1977 included Steve Gold (Marshall), Shel Bynum, Alan Cameron, Mitch Clarke, Nick Archer, Bruce Key, Ron Spivey, Kitty Kinnin, Reid Stott, Steve Norris, and Steve Day. Production chores were handled by Jack Shaw and Rowell Gormon. The late ’70s era of WKZL’s programming was a mix of Top 40 and album cuts formulated into playlists based on focus groups created under the direction of eccentric owner Bob Brown.

Program hosts included Morning Show Host Doug Paul, Rod Davis, Chris Angel, Kitty Kinnin, J.J. Hemingway, DD Thornton, and Chuck Holloway, who also served as music director. Doug Paul served as program director during his time at WKZL between 1978 and 1982. During this period, the station was pioneering music research that included weekly focus groups of 18- to 49-year-old listeners assembled by Owner Bob Brown and Sharon Paul. The format of the station was a unique hybrid of Deep Tracks, Top 40 and Jazz. Local music artists were featured in the programming mix and live concerts were broadcast weekly via NBC's The Source and other radio program syndicators. Known for a keen spot production sound and aggressive demo sales, the WKZL of the late 70's won many local and regional advertising awards and had up to three full-time copywriters on staff.

Brown eventually sold WAAA to Mutter Evans, who made history at age 25 by becoming the youngest black woman to own a commercial radio station in the US. Soon afterwards Brown sold WKZL to Nationwide Broadcasting, while maintaining ownership of the building that housed both stations.

When Nationwide took control and installed Station Manager Rick Fromme and Program Director Tom Daniels, the station changed its format to the more classic AOR (Album-oriented rock) under the guidance of the radio consultant firm Burkhart/Abrams. By 1982, WKZL was known by its slogan as “North Carolina’s Best Rock”. The playlist was built around well-known stadium artists such as Pink Floyd, The Who, and Led Zeppelin along with Southern Rock favorites Lynyrd Skynyrd, the Allman Brothers Band, and Molly Hatchet. Heavy metal artists AC/DC, Judas Priest, Ozzy Osbourne, and copycat artists also shared the spotlight with AOR pop artists REO Speedwagon and Journey.

Some of the original staff remained - including Chuck Holloway and Kitty Kinnin - but most of the new staff brought on board came from other AOR stations. DJs included DD Thornton (WKZL DJ from August 1978 to August 1979), Danno Lopez, Charlie McGee, Tim Hogan, and Neal Cassady.

Although WKZL branded itself as a classic rock station, it also distinguished itself as a leader with a new music program launched in March 1982 called the "New Generation Show". Former WKZL DJ DD Thornton submitted a proposal for a one-hour Sunday evening show to introduce new, innovative artists to the classic rock audience. Her proposal was considered so risky WKZL had to present it to Burkhart/Abrams asking for approval. Lee Abrams granted approval to give the show a test run.

The show debuted in March 1982 on Sunday evenings from 11:00 to midnight. Among the featured artists were The Pretenders, Talking Heads, Elvis Costello, and XTC. The show became so popular that station manager Fromme decided to expand the show from 11:00 p.m. to 1:00 a.m. Around the same time, local nightclub "Casablanca" asked to try a live version of the show on Monday nights. That weekly event drew large crowds and ran for several years. Eventually the "New Generation Show" was expanded to Sundays from 10:00 p.m. to 1:00 a.m. and was live at several clubs in Winston-Salem and Greensboro.

The popularity of many of the new artists that were played on "New Generation," the introduction of MTV, and the dedication of record and radio professionals who recognized the value of these new artists, prompted WKZL to open its format a bit and bring new artists such as X, the English Beat, the Psychedelic Furs, Berlin, Gary Numan, Wall of Voodoo, Duran Duran, U2, and R.E.M., into regular rotation. Because of Thornton's persistence, R.E.M.'s song "Radio Free Europe" was allowed into WKZL's playlist, making WKZL one of the first major commercial stations to play R.E.M.'s music in high rotation.

WKZL went through a series of Program Directors grappling with the emergence of pop bands gaining popularity through MTV and how to balance these modern bands with the traditional “classic rock” format. By 1984 and before 1985 rolled along, the hard-edge sound gave way to the pop sounds of Prince, Michael Jackson, and other artists who frequented Billboard's Top 40/CHR charts. At that point, the station flipped to CHR, and is one of the two dominant CHR stations in the Piedmont Triad, with the other being WKSI. On June 1, 1985, WKZL became an affiliate of American Top 40 with Casey Kasem.

While the "New Generation Show" remained popular, as the station format and management evolved towards the mainstream formula, program creator and producer DD Thornton altered the program name to "Choice Cuts" as a way of keeping pace with WKZL's changing facade, although the show's format remained the same. Yet as WKZL's format increasingly moved away from rock and into CHR, the juxtaposition of a show featuring groundbreaking artists with formulaic hits became more incongruous. Thornton ended up canceling the show and eventually left WKZL.

In January 1992, WKZL called itself "107.5 The Eagle", playing adult contemporary music. For a brief time, the station was modern adult contemporary, competing directly with "98-7 The Point" (which changed to variety hits in 2005). Eventually the decision was made to return to Top 40. That came in 1999, around Labor Day weekend, when the station stunted, with recordings by management saying that the station was underperforming and that all the deejays were suspended until a new plan could be worked out. Morning man Jack Murphy was with the station from 1993 until 2012. The core of the Murphy in the Morning Show for most of the 1990s was Jack, joined by Terrie Knight (who also did news) and Chris Kelly (who also produced the show). Eric Christopher (1996–1998) was a weekend part-timer who became the morning show producer. Knight and Kelly exited in 1999, when Kelly went to do the "2 Guys Named Chris" show on Dick Broadcasting's other property, Rock 92 (WKRR). Knight went to do afternoons (at KZL), where she stayed until 2005 when she left the station and radio, altogether. Following Kelly and Knight, Jack Murphy was joined by cohosts Jeff Corbett, Britt Whitmire (1999–2003), Heather B. (2000–2002), Josie Cothran (2002–2007), John Garrett (2003–2004), Josh "in the Box" Anderson (2004–2010), Jared Pike (2007-current) and Katie O'Brien Tesh (2005-current).

Jared and Katie in the Morning, hosted by Jared Pike and Katie Tesh took over in June 2012 and are joined on air by Jason Goodman, Man Kisser Matt and Intern Squidward. Jared and Katie in the Morning have won the North Carolina Association of Broadcasters Morning Show of the Year for a large market in 2017 and again in 2021. Jared and Katie in the Morning are syndicated to Savannah, Georgia and Myrtle Beach, South Carolina. Jared and Katie in the Morning are known for their humor, on-air banter, War of the Roses, Pop Quiz, Torture Tuesday, Why Are You In Court Today and scoring large celebrity interviews including Miley Cyrus, Bill and Hillary Clinton, Joe Biden and Barack Obama.

1075 WKZL was a finalist for the national Marconi Awards for best CHR station in the country for 3 straight years - 2018, 2019 and 2020.

== Controversy ==
In August 2015, Jared Pike and Jason Goodman were suspended after an on-air altercation erupted during "the baby bottle challenge." After apologizing to the staff and to their audience they were back on the air a week later.
