= Winston-Salem Journal =

Daily newspaper in Forsyth County, North Carolina

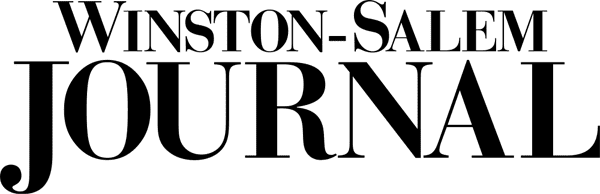

- Front page on August 28, 2011
- Type: Daily newspaper
- Format: Broadsheet
- Owner: Lee Enterprises
- Publisher: Alton Brown
- Editor: Jeri Young
- Founded: 1897 (129 years ago)
- Language: American English
- Headquarters: 418 N. Marshall Street; Winston-Salem, North Carolina 27101; United States
- Country: United States
- Circulation: 19,674 Daily; 20,548 Sunday (as of 2023)
- OCLC number: 12156422
- Website: journalnow.com

The Winston-Salem Journal is an American, English language daily newspaper primarily serving Winston-Salem and Forsyth County, North Carolina. It also covers Northwestern North Carolina.

The paper is owned by Lee Enterprises. The Journal was founded in 1897.

== Overview ==
The Journal is primarily distributed through Forsyth County and the county seat of Winston-Salem. However, the paper also is distributed in Alleghany County, Ashe County, Davidson County, Davie County, Stokes County, Surry County, Wilkes County, Watauga County, and Yadkin County.

The newspaper has an online presence called JournalNow. The Journal's television partner is WGHP of High Point, North Carolina. The newspaper produces several weekly sections, including Business, Food, Journal West, and Relish. It also publishes a monthly city magazine called Winston-Salem Monthly, which started in 2006 and several special editions, including Carolina Weddings, City Guide, and WS Works.

The Winston-Salem Journal has won several N.C. Press Association awards. In 2018, the paper won a Media and the Law Award of Excellence for Best Daily Article (Scott Sexton); the Henry Lee Weathers Freedom of Information Award; and a General Excellence award for their website. In 2017, the paper won the Hugh Morton Photographer of the Year award (Allison Lee Isley), Beat News Reporting, Best Community Coverage, and more.

== History ==
Preceding newspapers include: The Daily Journal (1900-190?) and Twin City Sentinel (1916-1974).

The Winston-Salem Journal, started by Charles Landon Knight, began publishing in the afternoons on April 3, 1897. The area's other newspaper, the Twin City Sentinel, also was an afternoon paper. Knight moved out of the area and the Journal had several owners before publisher D.A. Fawcett made it a morning paper starting January 2, 1902.

Later that summer, the Journal began publishing on Sundays, after which Fawcett's church removed him from its membership. In 1903, A.F.W. Leslie and his son, A.V. Leslie, bought the paper. The elder Leslie, an artist and the son of an engraver, made the Journal the state's first newspaper to have photographs.

Owen Moon bought the Journal in 1925, and the Sentinel, owned by Frank A. Gannett of the New York newspaper chain, in 1927.

The Sentinel began as the Twin City Daily on May 4, 1885, serving both Winston and Salem. The Weekly Gleaner, founded by John Christian Blum on January 6, 1829, served the small community of Salem and was later taken over by the weekly Western Sentinel, the first newspaper in Winston on May 16, 1856. The Twin City Daily, in turn, took over the Sentinel.

The Journal and Sentinel moved into a new building on North Marshall Street in 1927, and the Sunday edition was called The Journal and Sentinel. Editor Santford Martin advocated improvements in the roads, especially in "the forgotten provinces" of Northwest North Carolina. WSJS, an AM radio station, and later WSJS-FM and WSJS-TV, took their call letters from "Winston-Salem Journal Sentinel" because the newspapers once owned all three stations.

Attorney Gordon Gray bought the newspapers on April 30, 1937. His commitment to serving communities throughout the newspapers' coverage area continued even after Media General Inc. purchased the newspapers in 1969.

The "Call SAM (Sentinel Answer Man)" column appeared in the Sentinel starting October 10, 1966. Bill Williams wrote the column, assisted by Christine Friedenberg, who took over in 1984. David Watson answered questions as the "Straight Answer Man" in the Journal from 1985 until his death in 2000. Ronda Bumgardner was the "Straight Answer Ma'am" from 2000 to 2009, and Tim Clodfelter became SAM in 2010. Melissa Hall became the second "Straight Answer Ma'am" in 2020. The column ended on October 6, 2024.

On March 29, 1985, the Sentinel published its last edition. This meant a stronger morning newspaper, and an increase in circulation from 73,000 to over 91,000, with Sunday circulation of 106,000.

In September 1994, the Journal moved some of its operations into a new 140,000 square feet (13,000 m^{2}) building on East 5th Street, with a Mitsubishi press that allowed improvements in color printing.

Other publications from the Journal serve older adults, people with pets, families with children in Forsyth County schools, prospective brides and young parents.

In 2004, the paper refused to endorse a presidential candidate. The paper endorsed Democratic President Barack Obama for 2012 presidential election even though it endorsed Obama's opponent Republican Senator John McCain in 2008. Its editorial-page had not endorsed a Democratic Party presidential candidate since Lyndon Johnson in 1964. The paper endorsed Libertarian Gary Johnson for the 2016 presidential election and was the second newspaper to endorse the Libertarian candidate in this election cycle instead of either Hillary Clinton or Donald Trump, the paper cited their distrust of both major candidates and of status quo politics in the American political system.

=== Cutbacks and sale ===
In August 2007, the Journal reported it was changing its daily business section and cutting five positions. Two of the positions eliminated were in the newsroom.

Many changes occurred in 2010. In April, the Journal's parent company, Media General, announced that it was dropping all Winston-Salem-based copy editor and design positions, shifting production to consolidated editing centers in Richmond, Va., and Tampa, Fla. Media General also announced that they are going to use a portion of their $1 million of cost savings to "focus on intensified local news coverage." In October, Carl Crothers, the paper's executive editor was let go as a cost-cutting measure. On December 15, the Winston-Salem Journal fired another 18 employees, in the closing of its copy desk.

On April 9, 2012 the newspaper's parent company, Media General, listed revenue that included revenue projections "if newspaper division is sold". On May 17, 2012, Media General announced the sale of most of its newspapers to BH Media, a subsidiary of Berkshire Hathaway.

On March 16, 2020, Lee Enterprises Inc. completed its $140 million purchase of BH Media publications, including the Journal, all of which Lee had managed since June 2018.

In June 2024, Lee Enterprises announced it will close the Winston-Salem production print facility and move the printing of papers including the Journal and Greensboro News & Record to Virginia or Tennessee.

On November 3, 2025, the Journal moved to a six day printing schedule, eliminating its printed Monday edition.

== Pulitzer Prizes ==
- 1971—Meritorious public service, staff; "primarily for their year-long campaign in print to save territory in western North Carolina and Virginia from the hazardous effects of strip mining." More details about the article are in a reprinted version of the paper's 1971 article: "Journal-Sentinel Papers Win Pulitzer Public Service Prize."

== Notable staff ==
- Linda Carter Brinson
- Bülent Ecevit
- Joe Felmet
- Stephen A. Smith

== See also ==
- List of newspapers in North Carolina
