= News & Record =

American newspaper based in Greensboro, North Carolina

- Type: Daily newspaper
- Format: Broadsheet
- Owner: Lee Enterprises
- Managing editor: Jennifer Fernandez
- Founded: November 17, 1890; 135 years ago, as The Daily Record
- Language: American English
- Headquarters: Greensboro, North Carolina
- Country: United States of America
- Circulation: 15,151 Daily; 16,725 Sunday (as of 2023)
- ISSN: 1072-0065
- OCLC number: 25383111
- Website: greensboro.com

The News & Record is an American, English language newspaper with the largest circulation serving Guilford County, North Carolina, and the surrounding region. It is based in Greensboro, North Carolina, and produces local sections for Greensboro and Rockingham County, North Carolina.

== History ==
The News & Record traces its roots to the Daily Record which was first printed on November 17, 1890, in Greensboro, North Carolina. An afternoon paper, it was begun by John Benson, Joseph Reece, and Harper J. Elam. Both Benson and Elam eventually sold their interest in the paper to Reece who operated it as sole owner for 14 years until his death in 1915. For four years thereafter it was owned by Al Fairbrother and George Crater until it was bought by Julian Price in 1919. The Daily News was a morning paper founded in 1909, an outgrowth of the recently defunct Daily Industrial News. The Daily News and the associated company, the Greensboro News Company, grew quickly, acquiring the other morning paper, the Greensboro Telegram in 1911, and in 1930, acquired the Daily Record.

The Greensboro News Company and its two papers were run by Edwin Bedford Jeffress, who owned half interest in the company, after 1914. He remained president until 1961, when his son, Charles, took over the reins of the company. In 1965, the company was purchased by Norfolk-Portsmouth Newspapers, based in Norfolk, Virginia. Jeffress remained publisher but the presidency was given to Frank Batten of Norfolk. Two years later, Norfolk-Portsmouth Newspapers became Landmark Communications.

In the early 1980s, the Greensboro Daily News and The Greensboro Record (formerly Daily Record) began gradually consolidating their operations, beginning with the Sunday edition in 1980, though there had not been an afternoon paper on Sundays previously, followed by Saturdays in 1983. By March 1984, both papers were combined into the News & Record, a single paper with two editions, morning and afternoon. The afternoon edition was eliminated two years later.

In 1999, the publication, at the direction of publisher Van King, broke with the downsizing trends in the newspaper industry and began a major expansion effort into communities surrounding Greensboro, especially the city of High Point and Randolph County. Editor John Robinson hired over 30 additional staffers, most of whom were assigned to existing news bureaus in Asheboro, Eden, and High Point. This brought the paper's news staff to over 100 people, the largest it ever became. The newspaper did not gain enough additional revenue from the expansion to operate sustainably, and King retired in 2004. He was replaced by Robin Saul, who stopped hiring replacements to fill open positions, preferring to consolidate reporters from satellite bureaus back to Greensboro.

On June 7, 2007, the newspaper announced it was laying off 41 employees, as part of a "business reorganization", the first layoffs in its history. Layoffs continued over the following years.

On January 3, 2008, it was reported that the family-owned Landmark Communications may be for sale. Editor John Robinson, facing declining budget projections for the paper, resigned in December 2011. On January 31, 2013, the News & Record was sold to BH Media, a subsidiary of Berkshire Hathaway, Inc., a Fortune 500 company owned by billionaire Warren Buffett. At the time, the paper had 23 reporters. During the first five months, the newspaper was subject to two rounds of layoffs. By July 2016, the paper employed only 15 journalists. The following year the printing of the paper was moved to Winston-Salem, the location of the BH Media-owned Winston-Salem Journal.

"[F]ew print dailies, at least in North Carolina, have cut their way to irrelevance as brazenly as the News & Record has under BH Media and current owner Lee Enterprises. "

— Former News & Record journalist Margaret Moffett, 2022

On March 16, 2020, Lee Enterprises Inc. completed its $140 million purchase of BH Media's publications, including the News & Record and the Winston-Salem Journal, all of which Lee had managed since June 2018. The acquisition was soon followed by another round of layoffs at both Triad papers, including five News & Record journalists, many of them from the sports staff. The paper was moved out of its downtown headquarters, which remained under BH Media ownership, and relocated to a rented space. In 2021 its reported circulation was 21,510. By August 2022, the paper employed only six reporters, and had no executive editor or local publisher. By early 2023 the paper had further reduced its staff to five reporters.

Starting November 3, 2025, the News & Record did not print a Monday paper, putting that day's paper online.

== Go Triad ==
Go Triad is a weekly insert in the News & Record each Thursday. The section is also available in free racks on Friday. Go Triad focuses on arts and entertainment, including reviews and listings of movies, concerts, theater, art exhibits and events, festivals and more, as well as restaurant reviews. It also has features about local figures in the arts and entertainment industry, including local bands, artists and others.

== See also ==
- List of newspapers in North Carolina
