= 1050 AM =

AM radio frequency

The following radio stations broadcast on AM frequency 1050 kHz: 1050 AM is a Mexican clear-channel frequency. XEG in Monterrey (Guadalupe, Nuevo León) is the dominant Class A station on this frequency. See also List of broadcast station classes.

== In Argentina ==
- General Güemes in Buenos Aires
- LV27 Rural in San Francisco

== In Canada ==
Call sign	City of license	Daytime power (kW)	Nighttime power (kW)	Transmitter coordinates
CHUM	Toronto, Ontario	50	50	43.487222°N 79.620833°W
CJNB	North Battleford, Saskatchewan	10	10	52.841667°N 108.306389°W

== In Mexico ==
Stations in bold are clear-channel stations.

- XED-AM in Mexicali, Baja California - 10,000 watts days, 200 watts nights
- **XEG-AM** in Monterrey, Nuevo León - 100,000 watts (daytime directional antenna, nighttime omnidirectional antenna). Transmitter located at 25.698056°N 100.175°W
- XEIP-AM in Urapan, Michoacán - 1,000 watts

== In the United States ==
Call sign	City of license	Facility ID	Class	Daytime power (kW)	Nighttime power (kW)	Transmitter coordinates
KBLE	Seattle, Washington	33667	B	5	0.44	47.563611°N 122.359722°W
KCAA	Loma Linda, California	43995	D	1.4	0.035	33.989444°N 117.186111°W
KCHN	Brookshire, Texas	68124	D	0.41		29.879167°N 96.035556°W
KFIO	Dishman, Washington	53148	B	25	0.26	47.599444°N 117.377222°W
KGTO	Tulsa, Oklahoma	65766	D	1	0.022	36.159722°N 96.0525°W
KJBN	Little Rock, Arkansas	32299	D	1	0.019	34.766111°N 92.293889°W
KJPG	Frazier Park, California	2268	D	10		35.024444°N 118.918056°W
KLOH	Pipestone, Minnesota	70737	B	9.38	0.432	43.995278°N 96.344722°W
KMIS	Portageville, Missouri	48550	D	0.6		36.425278°N 89.691389°W
KMTA	Miles City, Montana	42379	D	10	0.136	46.401111°N 105.651667°W
KORE	Springfield-Eugene, Oregon	64034	D	5	0.105	44.081667°N 123.109444°W
KSIS	Sedalia, Missouri	5202	D	1	0.086	38.734167°N 93.225278°W
KTBL	Los Ranchos, New Mexico	48604	B	1	1	34.979444°N 106.736944°W
KTCT	San Mateo, California	51188	B	50	10	37.650556°N 122.150556°W
KVPI	Ville Platte, Louisiana	70233	D	0.25	0.01	30.694167°N 92.312778°W
KXCA	Lawton, Oklahoma	61593	D	0.25	0.006	34.590833°N 98.352778°W
WAMN	Green Valley, West Virginia	70851	D	1.43	0.2	37.305556°N 81.125°W
WAYS	Conway, South Carolina	17484	B	5	0.473	33.848889°N 79.084167°W
WBQH	Silver Spring, Maryland	873	D	2	0.041	39.014167°N 77.029444°W
WBRG	Lynchburg, Virginia	67704	D	3.8	0.09	37.420833°N 79.115278°W
WBUT	Butler, Pennsylvania	71214	D	0.5	0.062	40.8975°N 79.889444°W
WDVM	Eau Claire, Wisconsin	1131	B	0.86	0.26	44.777222°N 91.474722°W
WDZ	Decatur, Illinois	53348	B	1	0.25	39.815°N 89.002222°W
WEPN	New York, New York	65636	B	50	50	40.776667°N 74.052222°W
WFAM	Augusta, Georgia	20595	D	5	0.082	33.455556°N 81.938611°W
WFSC	Franklin, North Carolina	14554	D	5	0.153	35.211111°N 83.368611°W
WFXO	Alexander City, Alabama	60762	D	1	0.048	32.950833°N 85.985278°W
WGRI	Cincinnati, Ohio	25525	B	2.5	0.25	39.080556°N 84.521667°W
WJCM	Sebring, Florida	73124	D	1	0.011	27.508333°N 81.422222°W
WJOK	Kaukauna, Wisconsin	19879	B	1	0.5	44.2475°N 88.3°W
WJSB	Crestview, Florida	14494	D	3.1		30.766944°N 86.585278°W
WLIP	Kenosha, Wisconsin	28478	B	0.25	0.25	42.552778°N 87.893889°W
WLON	Lincolnton, North Carolina	62366	D	1	0.231	35.491111°N 81.2675°W
WLYC	Williamsport, Pennsylvania	52187	D	1	0.03	41.262222°N 77.033056°W
WLYQ	Parkersburg, West Virginia	15255	D	5	0.144	39.258056°N 81.563611°W
WMNZ	Montezuma, Georgia	39558	D	0.25	0.041	32.298056°N 84.033889°W
WMSG	Oakland, Maryland	49935	D	1	0.075	39.392222°N 79.398333°W
WNES	Central City, Kentucky	46946	D	1	0.172	37.269167°N 87.142222°W
WROS	Jacksonville, Florida	66333	D	5	0.013	30.353889°N 81.739167°W
WSMT	Sparta, Tennessee	3336	D	0.95	0.178	35.954444°N 85.476944°W
WTCA	Plymouth, Indiana	13002	B	0.25	0.25	41.318333°N 86.311389°W
WTKA	Ann Arbor, Michigan	47116	B	10	0.5	42.146111°N 83.66°W
WTWG	Columbus, Mississippi	64363	D	1	0.048	33.51°N 88.412778°W
WVXX	Norfolk, Virginia	71286	B	5	0.358	36.828889°N 76.207222°W
WWGP	Sanford, North Carolina	74181	D	1	0.161	35.440556°N 79.214722°W
WWIC	Scottsboro, Alabama	59421	D	1	0.1	34.673056°N 86.053056°W

== In Uruguay ==
- CX 26 Radio Uruguay in Montevideo
