= WEAL =

Simulcasts WBFJ-FM, Winston-Salem, NC
- Greensboro, North Carolina; United States
- Broadcast area: Greensboro and Vicinity
- Frequency: 1510 kHz

Programming
- Format: Contemporary Christian

Ownership
- Owner: Delmarva Educational Association
- Sister stations: WWNT

History
- Call sign meaning: "Wheel"

Technical information
- Licensing authority: FCC
- Facility ID: 49315
- Class: D
- Power: 820 watts (days only); 200 watts (critical hours)
- Transmitter coordinates: 36°3′42″N 79°47′35″W
- Translator: 104.7 W284BN (Greensboro)

Links
- Public license information: Public file; LMS
- Webcast: Listen live
- Website: wbfj.fm

WEAL (1510 AM) is a radio station licensed to Greensboro, North Carolina, United States, featuring a contemporary Christian format. It broadcasts only during daylight hours allowing "clear channel" station WLAC in Nashville, Tennessee, to cover the southern portion of the Atlantic coast. Owned by Delmarva Educational Association, the station's studios are near Piedmont Triad International Airport in Greensboro, and a transmitter site is downtown.

== History ==
After success with a similar station in Charlotte, Francis Fitzgerald started Greensboro's first black radio station after realizing Greensboro's African-American community listened to a Winston-Salem station.

WEAL provided music and information; for people who could not read, WEAL provided an important service. In 1963, Bill Mitchell left WPET to run WEAL. Among his accomplishments: the program "Sounder", co-hosted by a black man and a white woman, Gil Harris and Lee Atkinson, and one of the first talk shows on a black radio station. Black advertisers did well on the station, but white-owned businesses hesitated before relenting. WEAL was the top station in Greensboro because white listeners had several choices.

Among WEAL's best-known DJs were Alfred G. Richard and "Merrill the Pearl" Watson. Fitzgerald hired Richard, who was already well known in South Carolina, for twice the money he was receiving. Additional announcers were Prince Ike, Sam the Sham Tate, The "Cookin Ty Miller", Tony "TonyB" Welborne, and Bob Jones.

Competition from FM radio and a daytime-only signal resulted in WEAL's decline.

Former logo

In 1997, Sinclair Broadcast Group purchased WEAL and WQMG from Max Media, which bought the stations in 1996. The deal also included WMQX and WJMH. In July 1999, Sinclair announced it would sell its four Greensboro radio stations to Entercom Communications.

With FM reaching the same audience by the 1990s, the station began phasing out secular music. For several years, the station's call letters were WQMG.

WEAL, along with sister station WPET, were sold to Stuart and Nancy Epperson's Truth Broadcasting Corporation in September 2020. Both stations joined Epperson's other stations in the Greensboro market, namely WTRU, WKEW, and WPOL. Galax, Virginia-based WBRF, another station partially owned by Stuart Epperson, also broadcasts in part of the same market. The sale, at a price of $400,000, was consummated on December 31, 2020.
