= List of 50 kW AM radio stations in the United States =

The following is a list of radio stations in the United States that are authorized to run 50 kW (50,000 watts) of power. This is the highest power authorized to any AM station in the United States.

Power Legend: U=unlimited time, D=daytime power, N=nighttime power, CH=critical hours power. Class A unless otherwise specified. Omnidirectional antenna unless otherwise specified. A comma after the power indicates sunset. Whatever is after the comma is the night-time authorization, to avoid interfering with other, higher priority stations. Another comma indicates if it's a directional antenna system. DA means the station uses a directional antenna system. DA1 means the pattern is always directional, with the same pattern, day and night. DA2 means the station has two different patterns (protecting different stations), one for Day, and one for Night. DAN means the station broadcasts omnidirectionally (equal in all directions) Day, and directionally at Night.
Call sign	Frequency	Community of License	Power
KAAY	1090 kHz	Little Rock, Arkansas	50 kW-D, 3.4 kW-N, DAN (Class B)
KALL	700 kHz	North Salt Lake City, Utah	50 kW-D, 10 kW-N, DA2 (Class B)
KBLA	1580 kHz	Santa Monica, California	50 kW U, DA2 (Class B)
KBOI	670 kHz	Boise, Idaho	50 kW U, DAN (Class B)
KBRT	740 kHz	Costa Mesa, California	50 kW-D, 0.19 kW (190 watts)-N, DA2 (Class D)
KCBC	770 kHz	Manteca, California	50 kW-D, 4.1 kW-N, DA2 (Class B)
KCBQ	1170 kHz	San Diego, California	50 kW-D, 2.9 kW-N, DA2 (Class B)
KCBS	740 kHz	San Francisco, California	50 kW U, DA2 (Class B)
KCKN	1020 kHz	Roswell, New Mexico	50 kW U, DA2 (Class B)
KCRN	1120 kHz	Limon, Colorado	50 kW-D, Daytime only, DA (Class D)
KCTA	1030 kHz	Corpus Christi, Texas	50 kW-D, Daytime only (Class D)
KDKA	1020 kHz	Pittsburgh, Pennsylvania	50 kW U
KDFD	760 kHz	Thornton, Colorado	50 kW-D, 1 kW-N, DA2 (Class B)
KDRI	830 kHz	Tucson, Arizona	50 kW-D, 1 kW-N, DA2 (Class B)
KDUN	1030 kHz	Reedsport, Oregon	50 kW-D, 0.63 kW (630 watts)-N (Class B)
KEEL	710 kHz	Shreveport, Louisiana	50 kW-D, 5 kW-N, DA2 (Class B)
KEIB	1150 kHz	Los Angeles, California	50 kW-D, 44 kW-N, DA2 (Class B)
KENI	650 kHz	Anchorage, Alaska	50 kW U (Class N)
KERR	750 kHz	Polson, Montana	50 kW-D, 1 kW-N, DAN (Class B)
KEX	1190 kHz	Portland, Oregon	50 kW U, DAN
KEXB	1440 kHz	University Park, Texas	50 kW-D, 0.35 kW (350 watts)-N, DA2 (Class B)
KFAB	1110 kHz	Omaha, Nebraska	50 kW U, DAN
KFAX	1100 kHz	San Francisco, California	50 kW U, DA1 (Class B)
KFBK	1530 kHz	Sacramento, California	50 kW U, DA2
KFI	640 kHz	Los Angeles, California	50 kW U
KFLC	1270 kHz	Fort Worth, Texas	50 kW-D, 5 kW-N, DA2 (Class B)
KFNW	1200 kHz	West Fargo, North Dakota	50 kW-D, 13 kW-N DA-2 (Class B)
KFNX	1100 kHz	Phoenix, Arizona	50 kW-D, 1 kW-N, DA2 (Class B)
KFQD	750 kHz	Anchorage, Alaska	50 kW U (former Class N)
KFXR	1190 kHz	Dallas, Texas	50 kW-D, 5 kW-N, DA2 (Class B)
KGA	1510 kHz	Spokane, Washington	50 kW-D, 0.54 kW-N, DA2 (Class B)
KGB	760 kHz	San Diego, California	5 kW-D, 50 kW-N, DAN (Class B)
KGDD	1520 kHz	Oregon City, Oregon	50 kW-D, 15 kW-N, DA2 (Class B)
KGNW	820 kHz	Burien, Washington	50 kW-D, 5 kW-N, DA2 (Class B)
KGOL	1180 kHz	Humble, Texas	50 kW-D, 3 kW-N DA2 (Class B)
KHTK	1140 kHz	Sacramento, California	50 kW U, DA2 (Class B)
KICY	850 kHz	Nome, Alaska	50 kW U, DACH
KIHU	1010 kHz	Tooele, Utah	50 kW-D, .194 kW (194 watts)-N, 42 kW-CH, DA2 (Class D)
KIRO	710 kHz	Seattle, Washington	50 kW U, DAN
KIXI	880 kHz	Mercer Island/Seattle, Washington	50 kW-D, 10 kW-N, DA2 (Class B)
KJNP	1170 kHz	North Pole, Alaska	50 kW-D, 21 kW-N
KJR	950 kHz	Seattle, Washington	50 kW U, DA2 (Class B)
KKOB	770 kHz	Albuquerque, New Mexico	50 kW U DAN (Class B)
KKOH	780 kHz	Reno, Nevada	50 kW U, DAN (Class B)
KKOV	1550 kHz	Vancouver, Washington	50 kW-D, 12 kW-N, DAN (Class B)
KKXA	1520 kHz	Snohomish, Washington	50 kW U, DAN (Class B)
KKYX	680 kHz	San Antonio, Texas	50 kW-D, 10 kW-N, DAN (Class B)
KLAA	830 kHz	Orange, California	50 kW-D, 20 kW-N, DAN (Class B)
KLOK	1170 kHz	San Jose, California	50 kW-D, 9 kW-N, DA2 (Class B)
KLRG	880 kHz	Sheridan, Arkansas	50 kW-D, 31 kW-CH, 0.22 kW-N, DAN (Class D)
KLTT	670 kHz	Commerce City, Colorado	50 kW-D, 1.4 kW-N, DA2 (Class B)
KMJ	580 kHz	Fresno, California	50 kW U, DA1 (Class B)
KMMQ	1020 kHz	Plattsmouth, Nebraska	50 kW-D, 1.4 kW-N, DA2 (Class B)
KMNY	1360 kHz	Hurst, Texas	50 kW-D, 0.89 kW-N, DA2 (Class B)
KMOX	1120 kHz	Saint Louis, Missouri	50 kW U
KMPC	1540 kHz	Los Angeles, California	50 kW-D, 37 kW-N, DA2 (Class B)
KMXA	1090 kHz	Aurora, Colorado	50 kW-D, 0.5 kW (500 watts)-N, DA2 (Class B)
KNBR	680 kHz	San Francisco, California	50 kW U
KNFL	740 kHz	Fargo, North Dakota	50 kW-D, 7.5 kW-CH, 0.94 kW-N, DA3 (Class B)
KNWN	1000 kHz	Seattle, Washington	50 kW U, DAN
KNX	1070 kHz	Los Angeles, California	50 kW U
KNZZ	1100 kHz	Grand Junction, Colorado	50 kW-D, 36 kW-CH, 10 kW-N, DAN (Class B)
KOA	850 kHz	Denver, Colorado	50 kW U
KOFI	1180 kHz	Kalispell, Montana	50 kW-D, 10 kW-N, DAN (Class B)
KOKC	1520 kHz	Oklahoma City, Oklahoma	50 kW U, DAN
KOTV	1170 kHz	Tulsa, Oklahoma	50 kW U, DAN
KOUU	1290 kHz	Pocatello, Idaho	50 kW-D, 0.024 kW-N DAD (Class D)
KPAM	860 kHz	Troutdale, Oregon	50 kW-D, 15 kW-N, DAN (Class B)
KPNW	1120 kHz	Eugene, Oregon	50 kW U, DA1 (Class B)
KPTR	1090 kHz	Seattle, Washington	50 kW U, DA2 (Class B)
KPXQ	1360 kHz	Glendale, Arizona	50 kW-D, 1 kW-N, DAN (Class B)
KRCN	1060 kHz	Longmont, Colorado	50 kW-D, 0.111 kW-N, ND2 (Class D)
KRKO	1380 kHz	Everett, Washington	50 kW U, DAN (Class B)
KRLA	870 kHz	Glendale, California	50 kW-D, 3 kW-N, DA2 (Class B)
KRLD	1080 kHz	Dallas, Texas	50 kW U, DAN
KRMG	740 kHz	Tulsa, Oklahoma	50 kW-D, 25 kW-N, DA2 (Class B)
KRPI	1550 kHz	Ferndale, Washington	50 kW-D, 10 kW-N, DA2 (Class B)
KRSK	1080 kHz	Portland, Oregon	50 kW-D, 9 kW-N, DA2 (Class B)
KRVN	880 kHz	Lexington, Nebraska	50 kW U, DAN (Class B)
KSFO	810 kHz	San Francisco, California	50 kW U, DA1
KSL	1160 kHz	Salt Lake City, Utah	50 kW U
KSTP	1500 kHz	Saint Paul, Minnesota	50 kW U, DAN
KTCT	1050 kHz	San Mateo, California	50 kW-D, 10 kW-N, DA2 (Class B)
KTIS	900 kHz	Minneapolis, Minnesota	50 kW-D, 0.5 kW (500 watts)-N, DA2 (Class B)
KTKR	760 kHz	San Antonio, Texas	50 kW-D, 1 kW-N, DA2 (Class B)
KTLK	1130 kHz	Minneapolis, Minnesota	50 kW-D, 25 kW-N, DA2 (Class B)
KTNN	660 kHz	Window Rock, Arizona, Navajo Nation	50 kW U, DAN (Class B)
KTNQ	1020 kHz	Los Angeles, California	50 kW U, DA2 (Class B)
KTRB	860 kHz	San Francisco, California	50 kW U, DAN (Class B)
KTRH	740 kHz	Houston, Texas	50 kW U, DA2 (Class B)
KTTH	770 kHz	Seattle, Washington	50 kW-D, 5 kW-N, DA2 (Class B)
KTWO	1030 kHz	Casper, Wyoming	50 kW U, DAN (Class B)
KUAZ	1550 kHz	Tucson, Arizona	50 kW-D (daytime only), ND (Class D)
KUTR	820 kHz	Taylorsville, Utah	50 kW-D and CH, 2.5 kW-N, DA2 (Class B)
KVTT	1110 kHz	Mineral Wells, Texas	50 kW-D, 39 kW-CH (Class D)
KWKH	1130 kHz	Shreveport, Louisiana	50 kW U, DAN
KWVE	1110 kHz	Pasadena, California	50 kW-D, 20 kW-N, DA2 (Class B)
KXEL	1540 kHz	Waterloo, Iowa	50 kW U, DAN
KXNT	840 kHz	North Las Vegas, Nevada	50 kW-D, 25 kW-N, DA2 (Class B)
KXTG	750 kHz	Portland, Oregon	50 kW-D, 20 kW-N, DA2 (Class B)
KYES	1180 kHz	Rockville, Minnesota	50 kW-D, 8 kW-CH, 5 kW-N, DA3 (Class B)
KYNO	940 kHz	Fresno, California	50 kW U, DA2 (Class B)
KYW	1060 kHz	Philadelphia, Pennsylvania	50 kW U, DA1
KYWW	1530 kHz	Harlingen, Texas	50 kW-D and CH, 10 kW-N, DA2 (Class B)
WABC	770 kHz	New York	50 kW U
WADO	1280 kHz	New York, New York	50 kW-D, 7.2 kW-N, DA2 (Class B)
WAPI	1070 kHz	Birmingham, Alabama	50 kW-D, 5 kW-N, DAN (Class B)
WAQI	710 kHz	Miami, Florida	50 kW U, DA2 (Class B)
WAZX	1550 kHz	Smyrna, Georgia	50 kW-D, 0.016 kW (16 watts)-N, DA2 (Class D)
WBAJ	890 kHz	Blythewood, South Carolina	50 kW-D, 8.5 kW-CH (Class D)
WBAL	1090 kHz	Baltimore, Maryland	50 kW U, DAN
WBAP	820 kHz	Ft Worth, Texas	50 kW U
WBBR	1130 kHz	New York	50 kW U, DAN
WBIN	640 kHz	Atlanta, Georgia	50 kW-D, 1 kW-N, DA2 (Class B)
WBOB	600 kHz	Jacksonville, Florida	50 kW-D, 9.7 kW-N, DA-2 (Class B)
WBT	1110 kHz	Charlotte, North Carolina	50 kW U, DAN
WBZ	1030 kHz	Boston, Massachusetts	50 kW U, DA1
WCBM	680 kHz	Baltimore, Maryland	50 kW-D, 20 kW-N, DA2 (Class B)
WCCO	830 kHz	Minneapolis, Minnesota	50 kW U
WCEO	840 kHz	Columbia, South Carolina	50 kW-D, DA (daytime only) (Class D)
WCKY	1530 kHz	Cincinnati, Ohio	50 kW U, DAN
WCNN	680 kHz	North Atlanta, Georgia	50 kW-D, 10 kW-N, DA2 (Class B)
WCRN	830 kHz	Worcester, Massachusetts	50 kW, DA2 (Class B)
WCRT	1160 kHz	Donelson, Tennessee	50 kW-D, 1 kW-N, DAN (Class B)
WCSZ	1070 kHz	Sans Souci, South Carolina	50 kW-D, 1.5 kW-N, DAN (Class B)
WCTS	1030 kHz	Maplewood, Minnesota	50 kW-D, 1 kW-N, DA2 (Class B)
WDFN	1130 kHz	Detroit, Michigan	50 kW-D, 10 kW-N, DA2 (Class B)
WDIA	1070 kHz	Memphis, Tennessee	50 kW-D, 5 kW-N, DA2 (Class B)
WDRU	1030 kHz	Wake Forest, North Carolina	50 kW-D, DA (daytime only) (Class D)
WEEI	850 kHz	Boston, Massachusetts	50 kW U, DA2 (Class B)
WEPN	1050 kHz	New York	50 kW U, DA1 (Class B)
WFAN	660 kHz	New York	50 kW U
WFDF	910 kHz	Farmington Hills, Michigan	50 kW-D, 25 kW-N, DA2 (Class B)
WFED	1500 kHz	Washington, D.C.	50 kW U, DA2
WFLF	540 kHz	Orlando, Florida	50 kW D, 46 kW-N DA2 (Class B)
WFLI	1070 kHz	Lookout Mountain, Tennessee	50 kW-D, 2.5 kW-N, DA2 (Class B)
WFME	1560 kHz	New York	50 kW U, DA2
WGCR	720 kHz	Pisgah Forest, North Carolina	50 kW-D, 15 kW-CH, ND2 (Class D)
WGN	720 kHz	Chicago, Illinois	50 kW U
WGSF	1030 kHz	Memphis, Tennessee	50 kW-D, 1 kW-N, 10 kW-CH, DAN (Class B)
WGY	810 kHz	Schenectady, New York	50 kW U
WHAM	1180 kHz	Rochester, New York	50 kW U
WHAS	840 kHz	Louisville, Kentucky	50 kW U
WHB	810 kHz	Kansas City, Missouri	50 kW-D, 5 kW-N, DAN (Class B)
WHKW	1220 kHz	Cleveland, Ohio	50 kW U, DA1 (Class B)
WHO	1040 kHz	Des Moines, Iowa	50 kW U
WHSQ	880 kHz	New York	50 kW U
WINS	1010 kHz	New York	50 kW U, DA2 (Class B)
WINZ	940 kHz	Miami, Florida	50 kW-D, 10 kW-N, DAN (Class B)
WISN	1130 kHz	Milwaukee, Wisconsin	50 kW-D, 10 kW-N, DA2 (Class B)
WIXC	1060 kHz	Titusville, Florida	50 kW-D, 17 kW-CH, 5 kW-N, DA3 (Class B)
WJBR	1010 kHz	Seffner, Florida	50 kW-D, 5 kW-N, DA2 (Class B)
WJFK	1580 kHz	Morningside, Maryland	50 kW-D, .27 kW-N (270 watts), DA2 (Class B)
WJNL	1210 kHz	Kingsley, Michigan	50 kW-D, 2.5 kW-CH, (Daytime Only) (Class D)
WJNT	1180 kHz	Pearl, Mississippi	50 kW-D, 10 kW-CH, .5 kW-N (500 watts) DA2 (Class B)
WJOX	690 kHz	Birmingham, Alabama	50 kW-D, .5 kW (500 watts)-N, DAN (Class B)
WJR	760 kHz	Detroit, Michigan	50 kW U
WJXL	1010 kHz	Jacksonville Beach, Florida	50 kW-D, 30 kW-N, DA2 (Class B)
WKNG	1060 kHz	Talapoosa, Georgia	50 kW-D, 5 kW-CH, ND2 (Class D)
WKNR	850 kHz	Cleveland, Ohio	50 kW-D, 4.7 kW-N, DA2 (Class B)
WKVM	810 kHz	San Juan, Puerto Rico	50 kW U, DA-N (Class B)
WLAC	1510 kHz	Nashville, Tennessee	50 kW U, DAN
WLNO	1060 kHz	New Orleans, Louisiana	50 kW-D, 5 kW-N, DA2 (Class B)
WLOR	1550 kHz	Huntsville, Alabama	50 kW-D, 0.044 kW (44 watts)-N, DA2 (Class D)
WLQV	1500 kHz	Detroit, Michigan	50 kW-D, 10 kW-N, DA2 (Class B)
WLS	890 kHz	Chicago, Illinois	50 kW U
WLW	700 kHz	Cincinnati, Ohio	50 kW U
WMAC	940 kHz	Macon, Georgia	50 kW-D, 10 kW-N, DAN (Class B)
WMQM	1600 kHz	Lakeland, Tennessee	50 kW-D, .035 kW-N (35 watts), ND2 (Class D)
WMUZ	1200 kHz	Taylor, Michigan	50 kW-D, 15 kW-N, DA2 (Class B)
WMVP	1000 kHz	Chicago, Illinois	50 kW U, DA2
WNCT	1070 kHz	Greenville, North Carolina	50 kW-D, 10 kW-N, DA2 (Class B)
WNDC	1190 kHz	Leesburg, Virginia	50 kW-D, 1.2 kW-N, DA2 (Class B)
WNNZ	640 kHz	Westfield, Massachusetts	50 kW-D, 1 kW-N DA-2 (Class B)
WNQM	1300 kHz	Nashville, Tennessee	50 kW-D, 5 kW-N, DAN (Class B)
WNTP	990 kHz	Philadelphia, Pennsylvania	50 kW-D, 10 kW-N, DA2 (Class B)
WNWR	1540 kHz	Philadelphia, Pennsylvania	50 kW D, DAD (Class D)
WOAI	1200 kHz	San Antonio, Texas	50 kW U
WOKV	690 kHz	Jacksonville, Florida	50 kW-D, 25 kW-N, DAN (Class B)
WOR	710 kHz	New York	50 kW U, DA1
WOWO	1190 kHz	Fort Wayne, Indiana	50 kW-D, 9.8 kW-N, DAN (Class B)
WPBS	1040 kHz	Atlanta, Georgia	50 kW-D, 5.5 kW-CH (Class D)
WPHT	1210 kHz	Philadelphia, Pennsylvania	50 kW U
WPTF	680 kHz	Raleigh, North Carolina	50 kW U, DAN (Class B)
WQBA	1140 kHz	Miami, Florida	50 kW-D 10 kW-N, DA2 (Class B)
WQLL	1370 kHz	Pikesville, Maryland	50 kW-D, 24 kW-N, DA2 (Class B)
WQOM	1060 kHz	Natick, Massachusetts	50 kW-D, 2.5 kW-N, DA2 (Class B)
WQOS	1080 kHz	Coral Gables, Florida	50 kW-D, 10 kW-N, DA2 (Class B)
WRKO	680 kHz	Boston, Massachusetts	50 kW U, DA2 (Class B)
WRVA	1140 kHz	Richmond, Virginia	50 kW U, DA1
WSB	750 kHz	Atlanta, Georgia	50 kW U
WSCR	670 kHz	Chicago, Illinois	50 kW U
WSJC	810 kHz	Magee, Mississippi	50 kW-D, 500 W-N, DAN (Class B)
WSM	650 kHz	Nashville, Tennessee	50 kW U
WTAM	1100 kHz	Cleveland, Ohio	50 kW U
WTAR	850 kHz	Norfolk, Virginia	50 kW-D, 25 kW-N, DA2 (Class B)
WTCM	580 kHz	Traverse City, Michigan	50 kW-D, 1.1 kW-N, DA2 (Class B)
WTEM	980 kHz	Washington, D.C.	50 kW-D, 5 kW-N, DA2 (Class B)
WTIC	1080 kHz	Hartford, Connecticut	50 kW U, DAN
WTLN	990 kHz	Orlando, Florida	50 kW-D, 14 kW-N, DA2 (Class B)
WTMJ	620 kHz	Milwaukee, Wisconsin	50 kW-D, 10 kW-N, DA2 (Class B)
WTRU	830 kHz	Kernersville, North Carolina	50 kW-D, 10 kW-N, DA2 (Class B)
WWBC	1510 kHz	Cocoa, Florida	50 kW-D, 25 kW-CH, DA2 (Class D) (daytime only)
WWFE	670 kHz	Miami, Florida	50 kW-D, 1 kW-N, DA2 (Class B)
WWGB	1030 kHz	Indian Head, Maryland	50 kW D (Class D)
WWJ	950 kHz	Detroit, Michigan	50 kW U, DA2 (Class B)
WWJZ	640 kHz	Mount Holly, New Jersey	50 kW-D, 0.95 kW (950 watts)-N, DA2 (Class B)
WWKB	1520 kHz	Buffalo, New York	50 kW U, DA1
WWL	870 kHz	New Orleans, Louisiana	50 kW U, DA1
WWNL	1080 kHz	Pittsburgh, Pennsylvania	50 kW-D, 25 kW-CH, DAD (Class D)
WWVA	1170 kHz	Wheeling, West Virginia	50 kW U, DAN
WXJC	850 kHz	Birmingham, Alabama	50 kW-D, 1.0 kW-N, DA2 (Class B)
WXKG	1010 kHz	Atlanta, Georgia	50 kW-D, 0.078 kW (78 watts)-N, 45 kW-CH (Class D)
WXKS	1200 kHz	Newton, Massachusetts	50 kW U, DA2 (Class B)
WXYT	1270 kHz	Detroit, Michigan	50 kW U, DA2 (Class B)
WYGM	740 kHz	Orlando, Florida	50 kW U, DA2 (Class B)
WYLL	1160 kHz	Chicago, Illinois	50 kW-U, DA2 (Class B)
WYMM	1530 kHz	Jacksonville, Florida	50 kW-D (Daytime Only) (Class D)
WZFG	1100 kHz	Dilworth, Minnesota	50 kW-D, .44 kW (440 watts)-N, 5 kW-CH, DAN (Class B)
