= WPET =

- Greensboro, North Carolina; United States
- Broadcast area: Piedmont Triad
- Frequency: 950 kHz C-QUAM AM stereo
- Branding: WPET AM 950

Programming
- Language: English
- Format: Southern Gospel/religious
- Affiliations: Townhall

Ownership
- Owner: Stuart Epperson; (Truth Broadcasting Corporation)
- Sister stations: WSTS, WTSB

History
- First air date: May 23, 1954
- Call sign meaning: Preach Everlasting Truth

Technical information
- Licensing authority: FCC
- Facility ID: 71271
- Class: D
- Power: 540 watts (day); 41 watts (night)
- Transmitter coordinates: 36°3′42″N 79°47′35″W
- Translator: 92.7 W224CO (Greensboro)

Links
- Public license information: Public file; LMS
- Webcast: Listen live
- Website: thecrossradio.com

WPET (950 AM) is a radio station broadcasting a religious format. Licensed to Greensboro, North Carolina, United States, it serves Piedmont North Carolina. The station is owned by Stuart Epperson's Truth Broadcasting.

== History ==
Wayne Nelson put WPET on the air, in June 1954. In the late 1950s, WPET was Greensboro's first rock and roll station.

For a few years starting in 1954, "Merrill the Pearl" Watson hosted a gospel music show on WPET, but many of his listeners didn't realize that he also hosted "Sugarfoot's Rhythm and Blues Express."

In 1967, under the Ownership of MIDO Communications and Station Manager (and part-owner) Tom Armshaw, WPET began airing Southern gospel music full-time.

From 1969 to 1974 Armshaw hosted one of the area's talk shows where listeners called in. He and Wes Jones, who came to the station in 1978, later co-hosted "Wes and Willie", which may have been the first radio morning show in the area with two hosts.

After WKEW became a Radio Disney affiliate in 1998, WPET hired WKEW's Andy Durham as its sports director. Durham started a local sports talk show, and WPET began airing high school football and basketball. Starting with the 1999 season, WPET began airing the games of Greensboro's minor league baseball team, then known as the Bats. Later, UNCG basketball and minor league hockey were added. While WPET is still active with evening and weekend sports programming, WPET takes great pride in continuing the Gospel in song and word. In 2007, WPET received a certificate of Congressional recognition for outstanding and invaluable service to the community, signed by Congressman Howard Coble.

Dave Compton, who came to work at WPET in 1978 at age 19, remains with the station now, with over 30 years of service. Dave serves as station Program Director, while Jim Scott heads up sports programming, Bahakel Communications sold WPET and WKSI to Entercom in 2001.

WPET, along with sister station WEAL, was sold to Stuart and Nancy Epperson's Truth Broadcasting Corporation in September 2020. Both stations joined Epperson's other stations in the Greensboro market, namely WTRU, WKEW, and WPOL. Galax, Virginia-based WBRF, another station partially owned by Stuart Epperson, also broadcasts in part of the same market. The sale, at a price of $400,000, was consummated on December 31, 2020.
