= WYSR =

- High Point, North Carolina; United States
- Broadcast area: Piedmont Triad
- Frequency: 1590 kHz
- Branding: Que Pasa Radio

Programming
- Format: Spanish Variety
- Affiliations: Que Pasa Radio

Ownership
- Owner: Iglesia Cristo Reyna Inc.

History
- Former call signs: WNST; WNOS; WGLD; WOKX

Technical information
- Licensing authority: FCC
- Facility ID: 34353
- Class: D
- Power: 1,400 watts day 14 watts night
- Transmitter coordinates: 35°59′04″N 80°04′08″W

Links
- Public license information: Public file; LMS
- Website: greensboro.quepasanoticias.com

WYSR (1590 AM) is a radio station in High Point, North Carolina. The station airs a Spanish language music and news format and is owned by Iglesias Cristo Reyna Inc.

== History ==
WNOS was a country music station in the 1970s, later changing its letters to WOKX. WOKX switched to Christian music, and the X in the station's logo looked like a leaning cross. In September 2003, WOKX switched to sports talk, becoming an ESPN affiliate, later changing to its current call letters.

Also in 2003, when WTOB owner Truth Broadcasting stopped selling time to La Movidita, that Spanish-language radio station moved back to WSGH. Que Pasa Radio moved from WSGH to WTOB and WWBG.

Early in 2006, WYSR switched to its current Spanish language format.
