= WBIG =

WBIG may refer to:

- WBIG (AM), a radio station (1470 AM) licensed to Greensboro, North Carolina, United States
  - WBIG (1925–1986), a former radio station located in Greensboro, North Carolina, United States, that operated from 1925 to 1986
- WBIG-FM, a radio station (100.3 FM) licensed to Washington, D.C., United States
- WTFN (AM), a radio station (1280 AM) licensed to Aurora, Illinois, United States, which bore the call sign WBIG from 1991 to 2026
