= Que Pasa Radio =

- Type: Radio network
- Country: United States
- Availability: North Carolina
- Owner: Latino Broadcasting, LLC

Que Pasa Radio was a network of radio stations in North Carolina broadcasting music and news in Spanish.

Que Pasa Radio was heard on WYSR 1590 AM High Point, NC and was formerly heard on WREV 1220 AM Reidsville, NC, WTOB 1380 AM Winston-Salem, NC, WLLO 1530 AM Durham, NC, WWBG 1470 AM Greensboro, NC and WRTG 1000 AM Raleigh, NC.

== See also ==
- Que Pasa Newspaper
