= WTOB =

WTOB may refer to:

- WTOB (AM), a radio station (980 AM) licensed to serve Winston-Salem, North Carolina, United States
- WSHP-FM, a radio station (103.9 FM) licensed to serve Easley, South Carolina, United States, which held the call signs WTOB from 2015 to 2016 and WTOB-FM from 2016 to 2020
- WWNT, a radio station (1380 AM) licensed to serve Winston-Salem, which held the call sign WTOB from 1947 to 2015
- WTOB-TV, a television station (channel 26) formerly licensed to serve Winston-Salem, which operated from 1953 to 1957
