= Que pasa =

Qué pasa may refer to:

- Quepasa, a website
- ¿Qué Pasa, USA?, a bilingual sitcom
- Qué Pasa (newspaper), Spanish-language newspaper from North Carolina
- Que Pasa Radio, Spanish-language radio station from North Carolina
- Qué Pasa (magazine), a Chilean right-wing political magazine

== See also ==
- What's up (disambiguation)
