= WBRG =

- Lynchburg, Virginia; United States
- Broadcast area: Lynchburg metropolitan area
- Frequency: 1050 kHz
- Branding: Super Talk 1050 WBRG

Programming
- Format: Talk radio
- Affiliations: Westwood One; Salem Radio Network; Performance Racing Network (PRN Radio)

Ownership
- Owner: Brent Epperson; (Tri-County Broadcasting, Inc.)
- Sister stations: WLVA

History
- First air date: September 7, 1956; 69 years ago
- Former call signs: WBRG (1956–Present)
- Call sign meaning: W LynchBuRG

Technical information
- Licensing authority: FCC
- Facility ID: 67704
- Class: D
- Power: 3,800 watts day 90 watts night
- Transmitter coordinates: 37°25′15.0″N 79°6′55.0″W

Links
- Public license information: Public file; LMS
- Website: www.eppersonradionetwork.com/wbrg

WBRG (1050 AM) is a commercial radio station licensed to Lynchburg, Virginia. It airs a talk radio format. It is owned and operated by Brent Epperson with the license held by Tri-County Broadcasting, Inc. It is a sister station of another Lynchburg talk outlet, 580 and 94.1 WLVA.

By day, WBRG is powered at 3,800 watts non-directional. At night, it must reduce power to 90 watts as 1050 AM is a clear channel with dominant station XEG Monterrey. The transmitter is on Old Ragland Road at Wright Shop Road in Madison Heights, Virginia. Programming is also heard on two FM translators at 104.5 MHz and 105.1 MHz in Lynchburg.

== Programming ==
Most shows heard on WBRG are syndicated. Weekday mornings begin with a Virginia-based morning show hosted by John Fredericks. He's followed by Chris Plante, Dana Loesch, Bill O'Reilly, Mike Gallagher, James Dobson and Brandon Tatum. On weekends, car races are heard from the Performance Racing Network.

== History ==
The station signed on the air on September 7, 1956. The station was originally a daytimer, powered at 1,000 watts and required to go off the air at sunset. It has always been owned by someone in the Epperson Family. The founder and first general manager was Harry A. Epperson, Sr.

Former logo

== Translators ==
In addition to the main station, WBRG is relayed by two FM translators to widen its broadcast area.

Call sign	Frequency	City of license	FID	ERP (W)	HAAT	Class	FCC info
W283DA	104.5 FM	Lynchburg, Virginia	200921	50 watts	0 m (0 ft)	D	LMS
W286CX	105.1 FM	Lynchburg, Virginia	145018	240 watts	51 m (167 ft)	D	LMS
