= XED-AM =

Radio station in Mexicali, Baja California, Mexico

- Mexicali, Baja California; Mexico
- Broadcast area: Imperial Valley, California; Mexicali, Baja California
- Frequency: 1050 kHz
- Branding: La Gran D

Programming
- Format: Regional Mexican

Ownership
- Owner: Radio Cadena Enciso; (Gloria Herminia Enciso Power; Gloria Herminia, Maricel, José Enrique, Marcia, Claudia Beatriz and Laura Elena Jiménez Enciso)

History
- First air date: May 1947

Technical information
- Licensing authority: CRT
- Class: B
- Power: 10,000 watts (daytime); 200 watts (nighttime)
- Transmitter coordinates: 32°39′31″N 115°22′42″W

Links
- Webcast: https://edge.mixlr.com/channel/lcezl
- Website: https://www.encisoradio.live/

XED-AM (1050 Khz) is a commercial AM radio station in Mexicali, Baja California, also heard in the Imperial Valley, California radio market. The station carries a Regional Mexican format known as La Gran D. This station is owned by Radio Cadena Enciso.

Because AM 1050 is a clear channel frequency reserved for XEG in Monterrey, Nuevo León, XED must greatly reduce power at night to avoid interference; it was a daytime-only radio station for nearly seven decades.

== History ==
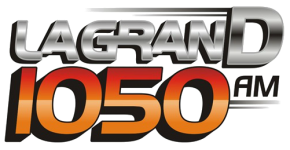
"La Gran D" logo used until June 2, 2019

Prior to the sign-on of XED in Mexicali, the call sign belonged to perhaps the first radio station in Mexico to be considered a border blaster. The first XED was located at Reynosa, Tamaulipas, and was under the advertising sales management of the International Broadcasting Company. Located across the Rio Grande River (Río Bravo) from McAllen, Texas, USA, the station broadcast with a power of 10,000 watts (10 kW) which was the most powerful transmitter in Mexico at that time.

The current XED received its concession in May 1947. After nearly 70 years of daytime-only operation, XED began broadcasting at night with 200 watts in the summer of 2016. This is the first time it has operated legally at night, as American station KTCT, which also operates on 1050 in the San Francisco Bay Area, has accused XED of operating illegally at night at more than its licensed daytime transmitter power, and has received FCC permission to broadcast at its regular daytime 50,000 watt power at night to overcome XED's interference. On June 2, 2019, at midnight, XED ceased operations.

XED returned on September 29, 2019, as part of a simulcast with XHMUG-FM 96.9 since September 28, 2019 to November 20, 2023.

XED has parted ways with Radiorama Mexicali after four years of simulcasting "La Poderosa" on 96.9 FM, following its acquisition by Cadena RASA. The station has now reclaimed its legendary name, "La Gran D" for the third time, but this time under Cadena RASA's ownership, no longer owned by Radiorama Mexicali.
