= Tom Shales =

American writer and television critic (1944–2024)

- Born: Thomas William Shales; November 3, 1944; Elgin, Illinois, U.S.
- Died: January 13, 2024 (aged 79); Alexandria, Virginia, U.S.
- Education: Elgin Community College; American University (BA)
- Occupations: Critic; author
- Writing career
- Period: 1968–2015
- Subjects: Television
- Notable works: Live from New York; Those Guys Have All the Fun
- Notable awards: Pulitzer Prize for Criticism (1988)

Thomas William Shales (November 3, 1944 – January 13, 2024) was an American writer and television critic.

He was a television critic for The Washington Post from 1977 to 2010, for which he received the Pulitzer Prize for Criticism in 1988. Shales also wrote a column for the television news trade publication NewsPro, published by Crain Communications.

== Early life and career ==
Thomas William Shales was born in Elgin, Illinois, on November 3, 1944, to Clyde Shales (who had once been Elgin's mayor) and Hulda Shales, and graduated from Elgin High School in 1962. He attended Elgin Community College before transferring to American University in Washington, D.C., where he earned a degree in journalism and was editor-in-chief of the student newspaper, The Eagle, for the 1966–1967 academic year, as well as the paper's movie critic.

Shales's first professional job was with radio station WRMN/WRMN-FM in Elgin at the age of 18. He served as the station's disc jockey, local news reporter, writer and announcer, on both the AM and FM bands. He later worked with Voice of America as a producer of broadcasts to the Far East.

== Career ==
Shales worked as entertainment editor at the D.C. Examiner, a tabloid newspaper, from 1968 to 1971. He joined The Washington Post as a writer in the Style section in 1972, was named chief television critic in July 1977, and was appointed TV editor in June 1979. His reviews were syndicated in newspapers nationwide. By 2006, his combined income from his salary and his syndication earnings neared $400,000 a year.

Shales was known for his withering putdowns of shows he disliked, and was nicknamed "Terrible Tom" and "the Terror of the Tube". His blunt style could polarize; Forbes Media Guide Five Hundred, 1994 wrote: "Forget the middle ground, Shales either loves it or hates it – and his reviews of TV shows and personalities are often unabashed paroxysms of that love or hate.... Like the medium he covers, Shales turns out fast-paced and amusing fare that often lacks depth". His influence was such that shows he panned would sometimes include unflattering references to him as inside jokes. Shales called such barbs "a TV critic's only shot at immortality".

His influence also extended to other critics. Daily Herald film critic Dann Gire, who founded and served as president of the Chicago Film Critics Association, described him as setting a standard with writing that was "incredibly funny, creative, inventive and smart" and with a style more akin to a barroom discussion with readers than a lecture.

In 1988, Shales received the Pulitzer Prize for Criticism for his work at The Washington Post, including his coverage of the Robert Bork Supreme Court nomination hearings. From 1998 to 1999, he was a frequent film critic for Morning Edition on National Public Radio. He was a guest co-host on the television show Roger Ebert & the Movies after the death of Gene Siskel. Shales was a member of the Peabody Awards Board of Jurors from 1991 to 1996.

In 2006, Shales ceased to be a staff writer for the Post and went on contract, where he remained until 2010, when he was laid off entirely by the newspaper. From 2012 to 2014, he wrote a column for RogerEbert.com.

=== Books ===
Shales published four books, including two he co-wrote with James Andrew Miller. In 2002, Shales and Miller published Live From New York: An Uncensored History of Saturday Night Live, which covers the history of the sketch-comedy variety show, and provides a behind-the-scenes look at its stars and production process. The book was re-released in 2015 to coincide with Saturday Night Live's 40th anniversary. The updated edition contained over 100 pages of new material.

In 2011, Shales and Miller published their second book together, Those Guys Have All the Fun: Inside the World of ESPN, which chronicles the history of the network ESPN from its infancy in 1979 through 2010. In 2015, Focus Features optioned the book to adapt it into a film.

== Death ==
Shales died from COVID-19 and kidney failure at a hospital in Alexandria, Virginia, on January 13, 2024, at the age of 79.

== Selected works ==
- On the Air!. New York: Summit Books. 1982. ISBN 9780671442033. OL 3490676M.
- Legends: Remembering America's Greatest Stars. New York: Random House. 1989. ISBN 978-0394575216
- James Andrew Miller (2002). Live from New York: An Uncensored History of Saturday Night Live. New York: Little, Brown and Co. ISBN 978-0316295062
- Miller, James; Shales, Tom (2011). Those Guys Have All the Fun: Inside the World of ESPN (1st Back Bay pbk. ed.). New York: Back Bay Books. ISBN 9780316043007. OCLC 668192506.
