= WLVA =

- Lynchburg, Virginia; United States
- Broadcast area: Lynchburg metropolitan area
- Frequency: 580 kHz
- Branding: Talk 94.1 and Fox 580

Programming
- Format: Talk
- Affiliations: Fox News Radio; Premiere Networks; Salem Radio Network; Westwood One; Baltimore Orioles Radio Network

Ownership
- Owner: Brent Epperson
- Sister stations: WBRG

History
- First air date: April 21, 1930; 96 years ago
- Former frequencies: 1370 kHz (1930–1935); 1200 kHz (1935–1941); 1230 kHz (1941–1949); 590 kHz (1949–2008)
- Call sign meaning: Lynchburg, Virginia

Technical information
- Licensing authority: FCC
- Facility ID: 39579
- Class: D
- Power: 250 watts day; 14 watts night
- Transmitter coordinates: 37°25′15.5″N 79°6′54.1″W
- Translators: 94.1 W231CE (Lynchburg); 100.5 W263DD (Lynchburg)

Links
- Public license information: Public file; LMS
- Website: WLVA Online

WLVA (580 AM) is a commercial radio station licensed to Lynchburg, Virginia. It airs a talk radio format and is owned and operated by Brent Epperson. The studios and offices are on Timberlake Road in Lynchburg.

WLVA is powered at 250 watts by day, 14 watts at night, using a non-directional antenna. The transmitter is on Ragland Road in Lynchburg. WLVA is also heard on two FM translator stations: W231CE at 94.1 MHz and 100.5 W263DD at 100.1 MHz in Lynchburg.

== Programming ==
Most of WLVA's weekday schedule is from nationally syndicated programs: Rick and Bubba, Glenn Beck, Todd Starnes, Dan Bongino, Charlie Kirk, Ben Shapiro, Sebastian Gorka and Mark Levin. Weekends include shows on money, health and other topics, as well as repeats of weekday shows. Most hours begin with an update from Fox News Radio. WLVA also carries Baltimore Orioles baseball games.

== History ==
=== Early years ===
WLVA was Lynchburg's first radio station. It signed on at 7:00 PM on April 21, 1930, originally on 1370 kHz. By 1934, WLVA was broadcasting at a power of 100 watts. At a time when many local radio stations were owned by or affiliated with newspapers, WLVA was not. Consequently, the station frequently found itself in direct competition with Lynchburg's papers. In 1934, WLVA allied itself with the Washington Herald which was attempting to increase circulation in the Lynchburg area. The Herald's Lynchburg correspondent, Nowlin Puckett, furnished local news on WLVA from August until December 1934.

In late 1934, WLVA experimented with rebroadcasting selected programs from station WLW Cincinnati. Most listeners in Lynchburg could not ordinarily receive WLW, more than 400 miles away. WLVA installed a special high-powered receiver on the outskirts of Lynchburg which it used to tune in WLW and re-broadcast the signal to Lynchburg listeners.

=== Piedmont Network ===
In December 1935, WLVA moved to a new building in Lynchburg and boasted a "selling staff" of 12, headed by Glenn E. Jackson. At that time, Jimmy Moore was director of programs; Al Heiser was chief engineer, and Jim Howe was head of continuity. In late 1939, under president Edward A. Allen, WLVA acquired station WBTM (Danville, Virginia). On January 1, 1940, the two joined together to form the fledgling Piedmont Broadcasting System. Each station took turns originating programs that were heard over both simultaneously. The network expanded in late 1940 to include station WSLS (Roanoke, Virginia). When Glenn Jackson, after 13 years at WLVA, killed himself at age 33 on April 9, 1942, the news was reported in Variety

Beginning in 1935 and continuing well into the 1950s, WLVA hosted an annual "Christmas Party" to raise money and clothing for needy children in the area. The all-day broadcast (usually the Sunday before Christmas) featured local performers who stopped by to entertain the listening audience. In between performances, announcers read the names of contributors. In 1942, WLVA's "Christmas Party" made national news when Byron Price, war censorship chief in Washington, D.C., forbade the station to read the names of donors on-air, fearing that doing so might "tipoff, accidentally...enemy agents."

On January 1, 1940, after Lynchburg Broadcasting Corporation gained managerial control of WBTM in Danville, Virginia, that station and WLVA began exchanging programs for four hours daily via newly installed lines that connected the two. WLVA radio moved to 590 kHz in 1947.

=== FM and TV stations ===
A companion FM station, WLVA-FM on 97.5 MHz, was briefly on the air from February 1952. The license was returned on March 10, 1955, as Lynchburg Broadcasting concentrated on its new television station and didn't see much of a future in FM radio. The 97.5 MHz allocation was occupied several years later by WCCV-FM (now WWWV) in Charlottesville.

On February 8, 1953, WLVA-TV began broadcasting from a transmitter on Tobacco Row Mountain west of Sweet Briar. The station was picked up as far north as Charlottesville, where residents reported good reception. WLVA-TV was originally a CBS affiliate, but also carried programs from ABC, NBC, and DuMont as well.

In 1965, Lynchburg Broadcasting merged with the Washington Star Company, which also owned WMAL-AM-FM-TV in Washington. The Washington Star was mainly interested in acquiring WLVA-TV and got the radio station as part of the package. The Washington Star Company chose to sell off its non-television assets, including WLVA radio, in April 1977. Channel 13 was now owned by Allbritton Communications, which changed its call sign to WSET-TV.

During part of the 1990s, WLVA was joined with two other stations known as "The Lake", simulcasting on 106.9 FM and 880 AM from Smith Mountain Lake. The format was "All the Great Songs," playing adult standards music. For several years during the 1990s, WLVA aired a talk radio format. Most of this programming was lost within a year after WLNI signed on.

=== Changes in ownership ===
In 2005, Truth Broadcasting purchased WLVA from Kovas Communications. The station was off the air at that time. In 2008, Truth Broadcasting, whose president was Stuart Epperson, Jr., announced WLVA's sale to Chesapeake-Portsmouth Broadcasting Corp., whose president was Nancy Epperson. In 2011, another of Chesapeake-Portsmouth Broadcasting's stations, WLES of Bon Air/Richmond started broadcasting on 590 kHz, while the still-silent WLVA was given 580 kHz.

As of June 1, 2012, WLVA switched formats from Christian radio to oldies/classic hits, as "QRockRadio". In November 2012, WLVA began simulcasting on translator W294BO on 106.7FM from nearby Concord, Virginia.

May 31, 2013, was the final day that WLVA and W293BY transmitted QRockRadio. On June 1, 2013, W293BY started simulcasting gospel stations WKBA/WKPA (AM 1550 from Vinton/AM 1390 from Lynchburg). For most of June, WLVA rebroadcast the output of co-owned talk radio station 1050 WBRG. On September 1, WLVA began airing its own talk format.

On February 16, 2014, Chesapeake-Portsmouth Broadcasting sold WLVA to Brent Epperson, at a purchase price of $55,000.

== Translator ==
In addition to the main station, WLVA is relayed by FM translators:

Call sign	Frequency	City of license	FID	ERP (W)	HAAT	Class	FCC info
W231CE	94.1 FM	Lynchburg, Virginia	81119	250	63 m (207 ft)	D	LMS
W263DD	100.5 FM	Lynchburg, Virginia	200920	10	6 m (20 ft)	D	LMS
