= WBIG (1925–1986) =

Radio station in North Carolina (1926–1986)

- Greensboro, North Carolina; United States
- Frequency: 1470 kHz

Programming
- Format: Adult contemporary

Ownership
- Owner: Jefferson-Pilot Communications Corporation

History
- Founded: October 1, 1925
- First air date: May 2, 1926
- Last air date: November 20, 1986
- Former call signs: WJBG (1925–1926); WNRC (1926–1930); WBAM (1930)
- Call sign meaning: "We Believe in Greensboro"

Technical information
- Facility ID: 30828
- Power: 5,000 watts
- Transmitter coordinates: 36°6′56.7″N 79°50′13.7″W

WBIG (1470 AM) was a radio station in Greensboro, North Carolina, United States, which broadcast from 1926 to 1986. It was last owned by the Jefferson-Pilot Communications Corporation (JP) and was its first broadcasting property. The company shut it down because of an insufficient signal to cover a growing radio market, competition from FM stations, and the rising value of the land it occupied.

== History ==
=== Early years ===
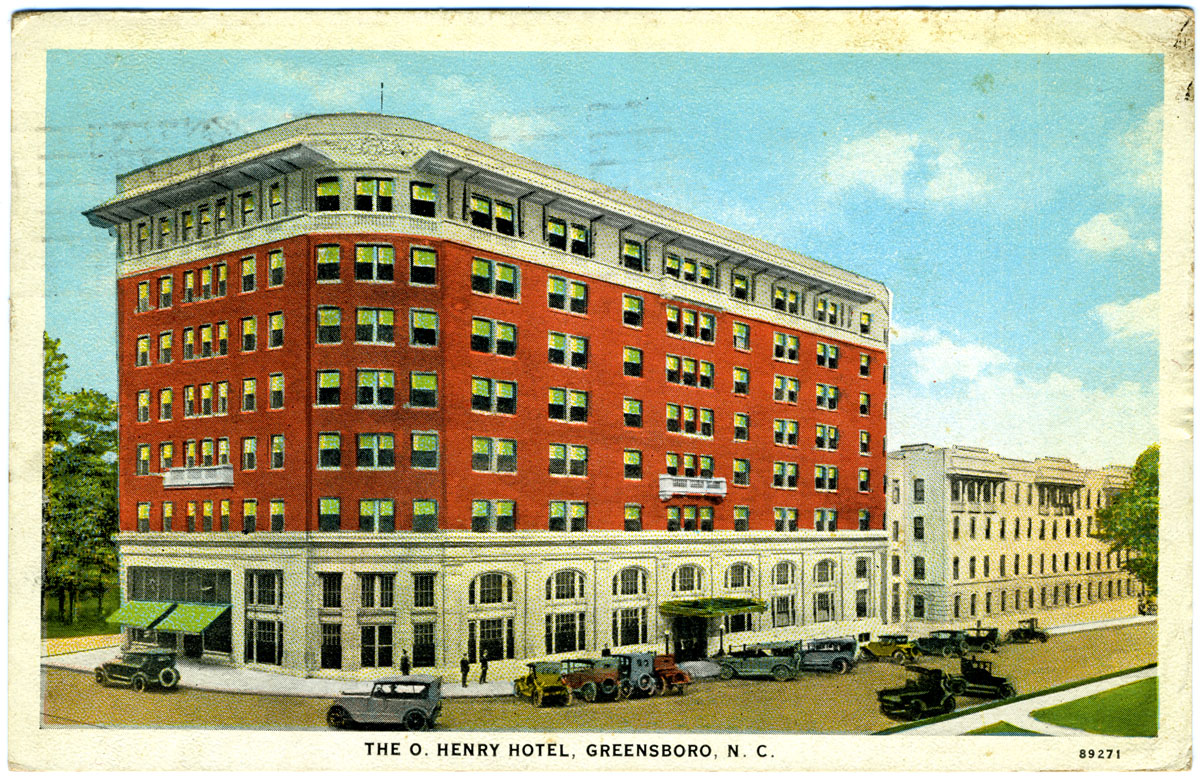
The O. Henry Hotel housed WNRC in its early years; the transmitter was here through 1930 and the studios through 1956, well into the station's years as WBIG.

Wayne M. Nelson built the station as WNRC, and it began broadcasting on May 2, 1926; studios were at the O. Henry Hotel in Greensboro. However, while the station had been established in Greensboro in 1926, it had in actuality moved from Charlotte, where it had been established as WJBG on October 1, 1925. W. Harold Essex, a later manager of WSJS radio and WSJS-TV in Winston-Salem and one-time president of the National Association of Broadcasters, started his broadcasting career at WBIG in 1927. Originally operating as a 500-watt station on a frequency of 1340 kHz, WNRC moved to 1440 kHz as a result of General Order 40 in November 1928. In 1929, Nelson considered moving the station to Winston-Salem but withdrew the application.

In 1930, WNRC was acquired by the North Carolina Broadcasting Company, owned by Tennessee hotelier J. B. Pound; the call letters were changed to WBAM on September 23 and then to WBIG on October 14. (The new call sign was said to stand for "We Believe in Greensboro".) The transmitter site was moved from the O. Henry—where the studios would remain until 1956—to the Jefferson Standard Building in downtown Greensboro, and daytime power was raised to 1,000 watts in 1932.

=== Jefferson-Pilot purchase ===
The 1930 transmitter site move would turn out to be critical to the station's future history. By 1934, WBIG was on the verge of going broke; it had already been briefly placed in receivership three years prior. Joseph M. Bryan, a fairly new employee of Jefferson-Pilot, persuaded a reluctant Julian Price, head of the insurance company, to enter the broadcast business by buying the radio station that was already in its building.

The move would turn out to be a profitable one for JP. An official company history noted that it bought WBIG "on Mr. Bryan's recommendation, and during the years that followed, he was able to report annually to the Jefferson Standard Directors that profits from the station equaled 100 percent of the original investment". More than a decade later, Bryan and Price purchased another radio station, WBT in Charlotte, and the firm went on to own radio and television station properties until the 2000s.

WBIG grew rapidly under its new ownership. It joined CBS; in 1939, it was approved to increase its power to 5,000 watts from a new site on Battleground Road. The station moved to 1470 kHz in 1941, along with other stations on 1440, when the reallocation of NARBA came into effect. The 1950s and 1960s were its heyday; popular morning man Bob Poole was an announcer at the station for 25 years, his career only ending shortly before his death of a heart attack in 1978. However, younger listeners gravitated to the Top 40-formatted WCOG.

For eight years starting in the mid-70s, WBIG played "contemporary adult sounds". Then WBIG switched to a format called Music of Your Life on June 19, 1982. The music from the 40s through the 70s served what was called "the forgotten adult audience" and included Frank Sinatra, Johnny Mathis, The Carpenters and Neil Diamond. In 1984 it switched to easy listening.

=== Closure and reuse of the frequency ===
Falling ratings and an inability to compete with FM radio stations led Jefferson-Pilot to shut down the station and its news and adult contemporary format. Its 16 workers were given notice on the afternoon of November 20, 1986; three hours later, WBIG was history. The closure came after Jefferson-Pilot explored either purchasing an FM station, selling WBIG, or relocating it, none of which proved viable. Afternoon announcer Dusty Dunn conducted his show as normal until confirming the shutdown on-air to listeners at 5:45 p.m. The closing message at 6 p.m. was pre-recorded by former newscaster Lloyd Gordon, a fixture at the station from 1957 to 1984, and was present in the studios to comfort mourning personnel:

Hello, this is Lloyd Gordon. I face this microphone with great difficulty. In a few moments, WBIG radio will sign off the air permanently. Over the next few days, you will no doubt read and hear about the factors which necessitated this action. I speak for the entire staff in saying that we leave you with great personal sadness, with tremendous pride in WBIG's 60 years of service to Greensboro, and with deep appreciation for your support as a listener. It's 6 o'clock. Remaining always in our hearts, someplace special, this is WBIG, Greensboro.

The instrumental version of the Barbra Streisand song "The Way We Were" was played as the station's final song while Lloyd Gordon delivered the final sign off message.

While WBIG still had a respectable 3.0 rating in the summer of 1982 among radio listeners 12 and older, it fell to a 0.9 rating by Summer 1986 against stiff competition from higher-powered FM signals. Wallace Jorgenson, the president of Jefferson-Pilot, told Radio & Records that the Triad had outgrown the station's signal, which only reliably covered Greensboro and Guilford County. JP vice-president Jim Babb called the shutdown "unusual" for the company and said, "[s]udden it was, I hope we don't have to do it again. But once the decision was made, we wanted our employees to be able to focus on their future."

The license was handed back to the Federal Communications Commission (FCC), though JP attempted to give it away to a nonprofit organization to no avail. The two self-supporting towers off Battleground Avenue were torn down on March 18, 1987, with Gordon in attendance; the studio building (which remained operational for weeks after the shutdown to help some staffers find new jobs) was demolished the following month. In 1992, a Lowe's home improvement store was constructed on the former transmitter site; the year before, JP sold the retailer the land for $3.65 million.

The WBIG calls were quickly reused on the FM dial in 1987 when WWMO in Reidsville moved into the market as WBIG-FM, and hired several WBIG staff, including Dunn and newsman Jim Krasula. WBIG-FM, however, merely traded on name recognition and bore little resemblance to the prior WBIG. In 1994, Walt Cockerham announced that he would open WWBG on the 1470 frequency. Its planned format and call sign were a tribute to the original WBIG, the call sign having been adopted in the interim at an AM radio station in Aurora, Illinois. It was then purchased by Stuart Epperson, founder of Salem Communications, and started broadcasting in 1999. In 2026, WWBG's owner paid $10,000 to acquire the WBIG call sign from the owner of the Illinois station.
