= WDRU =

- Creedmoor, North Carolina; United States
- Broadcast area: Raleigh–Durham; Research Triangle
- Frequency: 1030 kHz
- Branding: AM 1030 the Truth

Programming
- Format: Christian radio

Ownership
- Owner: Truth Broadcasting Corporation
- Sister stations: WTRU, WCRU, WLES, KUTR

History
- First air date: September 1, 1989; 36 years ago
- Former call signs: WBZN (1984–1987); WFTK (1987–2005)

Technical information
- Licensing authority: FCC
- Facility ID: 53104
- Class: D
- Power: 50,000 watts daytime only
- Transmitter coordinates: 36°10′43.52″N 78°45′29.02″W
- Translator: See § Translators
- Repeater: 103.9 WNNL-HD2 (Fuquay-Varina)

Links
- Public license information: Public file; LMS
- Website: www.truthnetwork.com/station/wdru/

WDRU (1030 AM) is a radio station broadcasting a Christian radio format. Licensed to Creedmoor, North Carolina, United States, the station serves the Raleigh–Durham area. The station is owned by Truth Broadcasting Corporation.

WDRU broadcasts Wake Forest Demon Deacons sports programming, beginning with the 2012 football season. Its parent company, Truth Broadcasting, reached a deal with WEGO in Winston-Salem and WKEW in Greensboro to provide coverage along the I-40 corridor, which had been covered by WZTK before flipping to Spanish programming.

== History ==
WFTK was a Christian radio station and later aired Spanish language programming before Truth Broadcasting changed to the current format.

The station was licensed as WBZN in 1984, but signed on September 1, 1989 as WFTK, owned by the Baker Family Stations, from studios along North Carolina Highway 56 in Butner. On May 3, 2005, WFTK became WDRU.

Originally licensed to Wake Forest, the station moved its license to Creedmoor in 2005. It also altered its signal pattern in order to better serve listeners in the western portion of the Triangle (Durham, Chapel Hill).

== Translators ==
WDRU broadcasts during daytime hours only unlike its sister station, WTRU in the Greensboro/Winston-Salem market. This is to protect WBZ in Boston. However, the station does operate FM translators, all of which broadcast 24 hours. The station is also heard in HD Radio at 103.9-2, WNNL HD2.

Call sign	Frequency	City of license	FID	ERP (W)	HAAT	Class	Transmitter coordinates	FCC info	Notes
W288BU	105.5 FM	Durham, North Carolina	154202	250	130.6 m (428 ft)	D	35°59′54.5″N 78°51′20″W	LMS	Relays WDRU
W289BD	105.7 FM	Raleigh, North Carolina	152721	250	120.1 m (394 ft)	D	35°47′21.5″N 78°40′44″W	LMS	Relays WNNL-HD2
W293DV	106.5 FM	Wake Forest, North Carolina	20706	50	0 m (0 ft)	D	36°0′47.5″N 78°31′11″W	LMS	Relays WDRU
