= WVNC =

WVNC may refer to:

- WVNC-LD, a low-power television station (channel 24, virtual 45) licensed to serve Watertown, New York, United States
- WHLQ, a radio station (105.5 FM) licensed to serve Lawrenceville, Virginia, United States, which held the call sign WVNC from 2014 to 2015
