= XHCHL-FM =

Radio station in Los Ramones–Monterrey, Nuevo León

- Los Ramones, Nuevo León; Mexico
- Broadcast area: Monterrey, Nuevo León
- Frequency: 90.1 MHz
- Branding: La Ranchera de Monterrey

Programming
- Format: Regional Mexican

Ownership
- Owner: Núcleo Radio Monterrey; (Frecuencia Modulada Monterrey, S.A. de C.V.)
- Sister stations: XHRL-FM, XEG-AM, XECT-AM

History
- First air date: July 15, 1996 (concession)
- Former frequencies: 99.1 MHz (1991–2007); 106.5 MHz (2007–2010)
- Call sign meaning: Station was originally located in China, Nuevo León

Technical information
- Licensing authority: CRT
- Class: C1
- ERP: 100 kW
- HAAT: 392.4 m (1,287 ft)
- Transmitter coordinates: 25°43′21″N 99°42′54″W

Links
- Website: https://laranchera901fm.com/

XHCHL-FM is a radio station on 90.1 FM serving Los Ramones and Monterrey, Nuevo León. It is owned by Núcleo Radio Monterrey and carries a Regional Mexican format known as La Ranchera de Monterrey. The transmitter is located atop Sierra Papagayos.

== History ==
XHCHL received its concession on November 23, 1994. XHCHL was authorized to broadcast with 15,000 (later 20,000) watts on 99.1 MHz originally from China, Nuevo León. On July 15, 1996, the station officially came to air with a Regional Mexican format known as "La Picosa". In 2007, XHCHL was moved to 106.5 MHz.

In 2010, XHCHL was moved to Los Ramones and now broadcast on 90.1. Initially, XHCHL on 90.1 was known as Beat 90.1, a dance Top 40 station featuring s a current-based mix of dance music, with Top 40 rap, hip-hop and R&B remixes, along with electronic and house music in English. It was the second Dance Contemporary radio station in Mexico, after semi-sister station XHSON-FM in Mexico City.

In 2017 and 2018, the Bichara family, which owns Núcleo Radio Monterrey, slowly shifted XHCHL toward a new direction, which was completed in early 2018 when the station adopted the name "90.1 FM" and the slogan "Sonamos Diferente"; the Ultra name was added in August. The format is similar to that used at the time by KJAV-FM in McAllen, Texas in the United States, which was owned by members of the Bichara family.

On May 1, 2020, Ultra 90.1 ceased broadcasting, making way for El Heraldo Radio's debut in Monterrey. The station mostly simulcast the network with some local programming for the Monterrey area. The news/talk programming was moved to XHSP-FM 99.7 upon the newspaper's outright purchase of that station from Grupo Radio Centro; on June 1, 2021, Ke Buena officially launched on the frequency by way of a franchise agreement with Heraldo Media Group. The agreement ended on December 1, 2022, at which time NRM resumed programming XHCHL-FM itself and paired it with the La Ranchera de Monterrey programming of XEG-AM 1050.
