= WTFN (AM) =

- Aurora, Illinois; United States
- Broadcast area: Fox Valley
- Frequency: 1280 kHz
- Branding: AM 1280 WTFN

Programming
- Format: Talk/home shopping/sports
- Affiliations: USA Radio Network; Fox Sports Radio; Chicago White Sox Radio Network; Chicago Bears Radio Network

Ownership
- Owner: Aurora Naperville Radio LLC
- Sister stations: WRMN

History
- First air date: December 13, 1938
- Former call signs: WMRO (1938–1989); WYSY (1989–1991); WBIG (1991–2026)

Technical information
- Licensing authority: FCC
- Facility ID: 5217
- Class: B
- Power: 1,000 watts day; 500 watts night
- Transmitter coordinates: 41°46′10.1″N 88°14′44.3″W
- Translator: 102.3 W272EP (Aurora)

Links
- Public license information: Public file; LMS
- Webcast: Listen live
- Website: www.1280wbig.com

WTFN (1280 kHz) is an AM radio station broadcasting a mixed format of talk, home shopping, and sports. Licensed to Aurora, Illinois, it serves the Fox Valley. The station is owned by Aurora Naperville Radio LLC.

== History ==
The station signed on December 13, 1938, as WMRO, a 250-watt daytimer owned by Martin O'Brien and operating on 1250 kHz; the North American Regional Broadcasting Agreement moved the station to 1280 in 1941. The station's programming was predominantly local, with a full service format being in place in the late 1940s. Among WMRO's on-air staff during this time was a young John Drury.

Vincent Cofey and Benjamin Oswalt purchased the station in 1957; three years later, the station was granted night authorization and implemented its current power levels. A separately-programmed FM sister station at 107.9 (now WLEY-FM) was added on September 1, 1964. Cofey and Oswalt sold WMRO to Dale Stevens in June 1969 to fund television station WLXT-TV (channel 60; now occupied by WXFT-DT), which had signed on May 18, and to a lesser extent an upgrade to WMRO-FM, renamed WAUR. WLXT shut down July 17, 1970; two years later, Stevens purchased WAUR from Cofey and Oswalt.

Beasley Broadcast Group bought WMRO and WAUR in 1986. Beasley placed its focus on WAUR, which would eventually be relaunched as adult contemporary station WYSY-FM, and showed little interest in WMRO; this culminated in 1989 with the dismissal of the station's entire on-air staff and a callsign change to WYSY, reflecting its conversion to a simulcast of the FM station. WYSY-FM subsequently moved its studios from Aurora to Chicago; at that time, Beasley opted to completely shut down the Aurora facility, which also housed the AM station's transmitter, and with little fanfare signed the station off. The callsign was changed to the current WBIG in 1991; two years later, Big Broadcasting Company, Inc. purchased the license from Beasley, and brought WBIG back on the air in November 1993. An agreement was signed October 26, 2016, to sell WBIG, along with commonly-owned stations KSHP and WRMN to Pollack Broadcasting for $2 million. The sale was consummated on January 31, 2017.

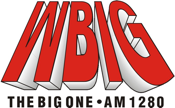
Logo before translator sign on

In 2026, WBIG sold its call sign for $10,000 to the owners of the former WWBG in Greensboro, North Carolina, which became WBIG as the Aurora station became WTFN. The WBIG call sign had been originally used in Greensboro from 1925 to 1986.

== Programming ==
Much of WBIG's current daytime schedule is devoted to The Big Radio Shopping Show, a home shopping program that airs during much of the daytime hours. The station does air an interview program, The Big Wake Up Call hosted by Ryan Gatenby. Fox Sports Radio programming is aired during most of the nighttime hours; weekend programming is also largely provided by Fox Sports Radio, except for At Home with Gary Sullivan and The Big Radio Shopping Show on Saturday mornings and religious programming on Sunday mornings.

WBIG is the flagship station for Kane County Cougars baseball. It also carries Chicago White Sox baseball, Chicago Bears football, Chicago Bulls basketball, and local sports.
