= WSGH =

Coordinates: 36°08′06″N 80°30′14″W

Simulcasts WPAR Salem, Virginia
- Lewisville, North Carolina; United States
- Broadcast area: Piedmont Triad
- Frequency: 1040 kHz
- Branding: Spirit FM

Programming
- Format: Christian adult contemporary

Ownership
- Owner: Positive Alternative Radio, Inc.
- Sister stations: WXRI

History
- First air date: June 26th, 1998
- Call sign meaning: Winston-Salem, Greensboro, High Point (cities of the Triad)

Technical information
- Licensing authority: FCC
- Facility ID: 72967
- Class: D
- Power: 1,100 watts day
- Translator: 106.1 W291DD (Lexington)

Links
- Public license information: Public file; LMS
- Webcast: Listen Live
- Website: spiritfm.com

WSGH (1040 AM) is a radio station broadcasting a Christian adult contemporary format. Licensed to Lewisville, North Carolina, United States, it serves the western portions of the Piedmont Triad, area. The station is currently owned by Positive Alternative Radio, Inc. WSGH also broadcasts on translator W291DD at 106.1 MHz, also in Lewisville, North Carolina.

1040 AM is a clear-channel frequency, on which WHO in Des Moines, Iowa, is the Class A dominant station; WSGH must sign off at night.

== History ==
On May 1, 2001, WTOB began broadcasting "La Movidita," which had previously aired on WSGH, from 10 AM to 5 PM weekdays and all day on weekends.

In 2003, Truth Broadcasting stopped selling time to La Movidita, which moved back to WSGH. Que Pasa moved from WSGH to WTOB and WWBG.

Logo as "Activa 1040"
