= WRMN =

- Elgin, Illinois; United States
- Broadcast area: Fox Valley
- Frequency: 1410 kHz

Programming
- Format: Talk; sports
- Network: Townhall
- Affiliations: Premiere Networks; Fox News Talk

Ownership
- Owner: William H. Pollack; (Elgin Community Broadcasting LLC)
- Sister stations: WTFN

History
- First air date: 1949

Technical information
- Licensing authority: FCC
- Facility ID: 19222
- Class: B
- Power: 1,000 watts days; 1,300 watts nights
- Transmitter coordinates: 42°0′21.1″N 88°17′55.28″W

Links
- Public license information: Public file; LMS
- Webcast: Listen live
- Website: www.wrmn1410.com

WRMN (1410 kHz) is a commercial AM radio station licensed to Elgin, Illinois. It serves the Fox Valley in the northwest suburbs of Chicago. The station's broadcast license is held by Elgin Community Broadcasting LLC. It has a format of talk radio shows and shopping programs.

By day, WRMN is powered at 1,000 watts non-directional. At night, it increases its power to 1,300 watts but it also uses a directional antenna to protect other stations on 1410 AM from interference. The transmitter is on Sundown Road at North La Fox Street in South Elgin.

== Programming ==
Weekdays begin with a local news and information morning drive time show, First Shift with Markie B. Middays and some hours on Saturdays feature shopping shows and Tradio. The rest of the weekday schedule is nationally syndicated talk shows, including Brian Kilmeade and Friends, The Jesse Kelly Show, Ground Zero with Clyde Lewis and Coast to Coast AM with George Noory.

Weekend syndicated shows include Rich DiMuro on Tech, The Weekend with Michael Brown, Bill Handel on the Law and Somewhere in Time with Art Bell. Starting with the 2012 season, WRMN became the flagship station for the Schaumburg Boomers of minor league baseball's Frontier League. Most hours begin with an update from Townhall Radio News.

== History ==
WRMN first signed on the air in 1949. It was originally powered at 500 watts and was a daytimer station, required to go off the air at sunset. It was owned by the Elgin Broadcasting Company with studios at 188 Division Street.

In September 1960, it added an FM station, 94.3 WRMN-FM. It is now a contemporary worship music station owned by the Educational Media Foundation, WAWE.

An agreement was signed October 26, 2016, to sell WRMN, along with commonly-owned stations KSHP and WBIG, to Pollack Broadcasting for $2 million. The sale was consummated on January 31, 2017.

In August 2019, WRMN signed-on FM translator station W244EJ on 96.7 MHz. Its construction permit was canceled in 2021.
