= XECT-AM =

Radio station in Monterrey, Nuevo León, Mexico

- Guadalupe-Monterrey, Nuevo León; Mexico
- Frequency: 1190 kHz
- Branding: La Voz

Programming
- Format: Christian

Ownership
- Owner: Núcleo Radio Monterrey; (Canal 1190, S.A. de C.V.)
- Sister stations: XHCHL-FM, XHRL-FM, XEG-AM

History
- First air date: August 20, 1971 (concession)

Technical information
- Licensing authority: CRT
- Class: B
- Power: 10,000 watts day 100 watts night
- Transmitter coordinates: 25°41′53.50″N 100°10′30.20″W

Links
- Website: www.contacto1190.com.mx/contacto/site/

XECT-AM is a radio station on 1190 AM in Monterrey, Nuevo León. Mexico. The station is owned by Núcleo Radio Monterrey and currently is known as "La Voz", a Christian radio format.

== History ==
XECT received its concession on August 20, 1971. Owned by Clemente Serna Alvear, of the Serna family that founded Radio Programas de México in the 1940s, XECT was a 500-watt daytimer. Serna transferred the station to Canal 1190, S.A., in 1975. In the early 1990s, XECT went from broadcasting with 500 watts during the day and 100 at night to its current power levels by way of technical changes authorized in 1992 and 1998.
