= WCOG (AM) =

AM station in Greensboro, North Carolina, United States

- Greensboro, North Carolina; United States
- Broadcast area: Piedmont Triad
- Frequency: 1320 kHz

Programming
- Format: Oldies
- Affiliations: ABC News Radio

Ownership
- Owner: Winston-Salem-Greensboro Broadcasting Company, LLC
- Sister stations: WBIG; WTOB

History
- First air date: May 22, 1948
- Former call signs: WCOG (1948–1985); WGLD (1985–1994); WWWB (1994–1996); WTCK (1996–1999)
- Call sign meaning: "Wonderful City of Greensboro"

Technical information
- Licensing authority: FCC
- Facility ID: 74203
- Class: B
- Power: 5,000 watts
- Transmitter coordinates: 36°9′1.49″N 79°54′47.13″W
- Translator: 105.3 W287GD (Greensboro)

Links
- Public license information: Public file; LMS
- Webcast: Listen live
- Website: wcogradio.com

WCOG (1320 kHz) is an AM radio station owned by Winston-Salem-Greensboro Broadcasting Company, LLC. Licensed to Greensboro, North Carolina, the station serves the Piedmont Triad area, with an oldies format.

== History ==
WCOG went on the air on May 22, 1948. Throughout the 1960s and 1970s, the station had a top 40 format. Dusty Dunn, Bob Dayton, Scott Derringer, John "Johnny C" Coffman and other DJs played a mix of music that might have included Led Zeppelin, Otis Redding, The Drifters and Janis Joplin. Al Troxler "ruled the airwaves" from above Sky Castle Drive-In on High Point Road.

While attending the University of North Carolina at Chapel Hill, Rick Dees worked for WCOG in 1969, and 1970, when the station was owned by Thoms Broadcasting based in Asheville, North Carolina. Dees left WCOG and worked at WTOB in Winston-Salem and WKIX in Raleigh, when those stations were owned by Southern Broadcasting.

By 1981, WCOG was a country music station. On March 18, 1985, the station changed its call sign to WGLD, and its format to beautiful music. A few years later, WGLD changed to satellite-delivered oldies; in 1989, this gave way to an adult standards format provided by the AM Only service. In 1994, the call letters changed to WWWB, and the format to talk radio, WWWB later simulcast WMFR. In 1996 the station changed again to WTCK, "The Ticket", and a sports talk format. The WMFR simulcast returned two years later, after WKEW dropped its talk format for Radio Disney.

In 1999, Truth Broadcasting changed the format to Christian talk and teaching and returned to using the callsign WCOG. The new format included Billy Graham, Franklin Graham, Charles Stanley and James Dobson. WTOB aired the same programming.

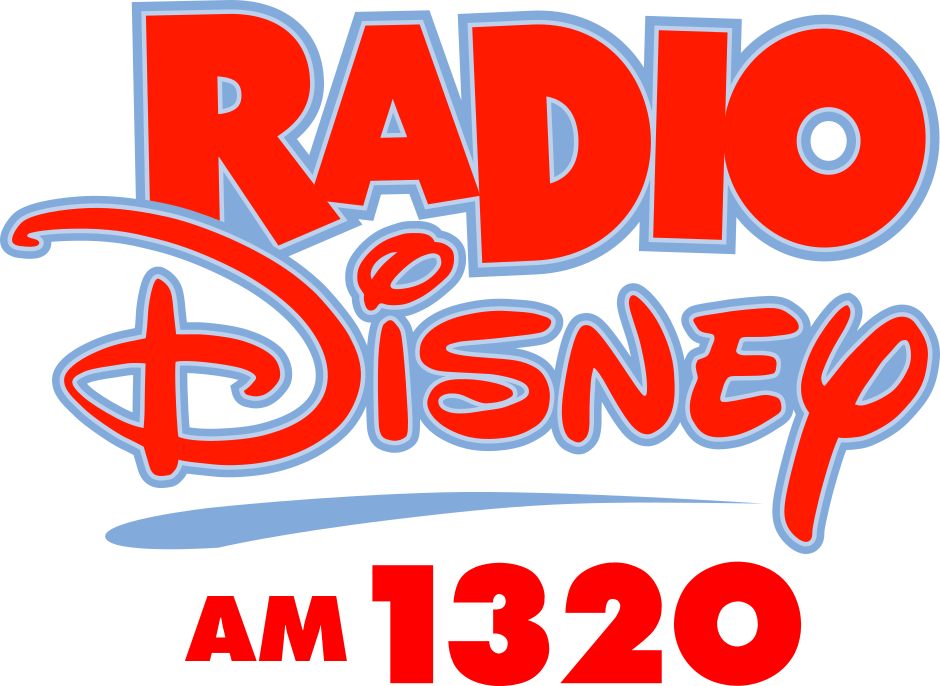
WCOG former logo used from 2002 until 2007.

On October 2, 2000, WCOG began telling listeners to switch to WTRU. Late in 2000, the announcement came that Truth Broadcasting would move the Radio Disney affiliation from WKEW to WCOG.

The Walt Disney Company bought WCOG in 2005, which meant more community involvement and visibility for the station. Disney subsequently decided to sell its smaller-market Radio Disney stations, and took WCOG and five other stations off the air on January 22, 2010. A sale to Curtis Media Group was announced on March 9, upon taking over, Curtis relaunched the station July 15, with a return to sports talk.

In March 2021, WCOG was purchased by Winston-Salem-Greensboro Broadcasting Company, LLC, and converted back to music. It became its own locally owned station in June 2021, broadcasting oldies. Local news and CBS News Radio also returned returned to WCOG. WCOG added an FM translator at 105.3 in December 2021, call sign W287GD licensed to Greensboro, North Carolina.

== Translator ==
Call sign	Frequency	City of license	FID	ERP (W)	Class	Transmitter coordinates	FCC info
W287GD	105.3 FM	Greensboro, North Carolina	203184	250	D	36°9′1″N 79°54′46″W	LMS
