= WLES =

- Bon Air, Virginia; United States
- Broadcast area: Metro Richmond
- Frequency: 590 kHz
- Branding: Truth Radio 590

Programming
- Format: Christian Talk

Ownership
- Owner: Stuart Epperson; (Truth Broadcasting Corporation)
- Sister stations: WTRU, WDRU, WCRU, KUTR

History
- First air date: September 28, 1959, in Lawrenceville
- Former frequencies: 580 kHz (1959–2014)

Technical information
- Licensing authority: FCC
- Facility ID: 72504
- Class: D
- Power: 1,000 Watts daytime 58 Watts nighttime
- Transmitter coordinates: 37°30′52.0″N 77°30′28.0″W
- Translator: 97.7 W249CI (Bellwood, Virginia)

Links
- Public license information: Public file; LMS
- Webcast: WLES Webstream
- Website: truthnetwork.com

WLES (590 kHz) is a commercial AM radio station licensed to Bon Air, Virginia, United States, serving the Greater Richmond Region. WLES is owned and operated by Stuart Epperson, through licensee Truth Broadcasting Corporation. It airs a Christian radio format as part of "The Truth Network", originating in Winston-Salem, North Carolina.Programming is also heard on FM translator station W249CI at 97.7 MHz.

WLES began as a daytime-only radio station in Lawrenceville in September 1959. It primarily broadcast a country music format. The station was moved into the Richmond area in the 2010s.

== History ==
WLES began broadcasting on 580 kHz from Lawrenceville, near the Virginia-North Carolina border, on September 28, 1959. It was a 500-watt, daytime-only outlet. The station was founded by Harry A. Epperson Sr. and was sold to Elton N. Doyle and William C. Link in 1966. Doyle became mayor of Lawrenceville in 1970; he sold his interest in the station in 1980, with Link becoming the sole owner, and remained mayor another decade.

Link sold WLES and WHFD (105.5 FM) to Willis Broadcasting Corporation in 1999. At that time, both stations broadcast country music. Within a year, Willis opted to retain the FM outlet and sold the AM station to Chesapeake-Portsmouth Broadcasting Corporation, owned by Nancy Epperson. By 2005, the station was airing an oldies format.

Chesapeake-Portsmouth Broadcasting filed a request in July 2007 to transfer the license of WLES to Truth Broadcasting, headed by Nancy's son Stu Epperson, Jr., but withdrew the request in August 2007. Subsequently, a construction permit request was filed to conduct a frequency swap with nearby station WLVA, which is owned by Truth Broadcasting and operated on the adjacent frequency of 590 kHz; the frequency change would also see WLVA move from Lawrenceville to Bon Air, a suburb of Richmond. The swap was completed in 2011. The station was issued a license to operate on 590 kHz on March 28, 2014.

Effective May 21, 2019, Chesapeake-Portsmouth Broadcasting sold WLES to Truth Broadcasting Corporation for $75,000; Truth was already providing its programming.

== Translator ==
In addition to the main station, WLES is relayed by an FM translator. The translator was acquired from another Epperson company, Delmarva Educational Association, for $100,000 in 2022 but was broadcasting WLES beforehand.

Call sign	Frequency	City of license	FID	ERP (W)	HAAT	Class	FCC info
W249CI	97.7 FM	Bellwood, Virginia	143583	240	131 m (430 ft)	D	LMS
