= WGTL (Kannapolis, North Carolina) =

- Kannapolis, North Carolina; United States
- Frequency: 870 kHz

Ownership
- Owner: Fred H. Whitley, Inc.

History
- First air date: 1946
- Last air date: December 25, 1992
- Call sign meaning: "World's Greatest Textile Land"

Technical information
- Facility ID: 22428
- Power: 1,000 watts (day only)

WGTL (870 AM) was a radio station licensed to Kannapolis, North Carolina. It operated on 870 kHz with a power of 1,000 watts daytime, non-directional. The call letters were chosen to represent a common slogan for its city of license, "World's Greatest Textile Land". WGTL operated from 1946 to 1992.

== History ==
=== The beginnings ===
The 870 frequency in the Charlotte market first went on the air with the call letters WGTL in 1946, it was owned and operated by Fred H. Whitley. From 1946 to 1948, the station had studios in downtown Concord at the Hotel Concord.

From 1948 to 1992, the studios were co-located with the transmitter on Highway 29 across from the Carolina Mall.

=== A side story: sister station WAAK ===
The 960 frequency in the market first went on the air with the call letters WAAK in the town of Dallas, North Carolina, on January 1, 1963.

The station was initially applied for by Wayne M. Nelson and was to be licensed in Concord with 1,000 watts daytime and nighttime. In 1960. Fred Whitley, owner of WGTL applied for the frequency as a daytime-only station in Dallas in order to keep new competition out of his market.

He won the construction permit for the station in Dallas, took the call letters WAAK off the top of the Federal Communications Commission (FCC) call letter list, refurbished WGTL's studio by buying the audio board from WSJS-TV, and put the old WGTL console in Dallas.

=== Station engineers ===
WGTL was built for Whitley by Foy T. Hinson, a local radio repair shop owner who developed an interest in broadcast electronics during his service in World War II. Hinson was the Chief Engineer for the station until December 1961. During the previous year, he had applied for a station of his own, and had constructed the facilities without the knowledge of WGTL's owner, Mr. Whitley. Hinson resigned from WGTL the last week of November, and signed on WRKB AM 1460 in Kannapolis the very next week.

William E. Rumple became the Chief Engineer of the station from that time until it went dark in 1992.

=== Location in Concord ===
Although licensed to Kannapolis, North Carolina, both studio and transmitter were within the corporate limits of Concord for the last 15 years of its existence.

The station was able to do this because Kannapolis was an unincorporated city until 1984, and lacking definite city boundaries allowed the station to be built closer to the commercial center of Cabarrus County than would usually be allowed.

== Programming ==
WGTL featured a Birthdays segment and a sponsored Obituaries segment. Each day began and ended with "The Lord's Prayer," which the station also played when it first signed on.

=== The final sign-off ===
Following bankruptcy and an extensive eviction proceeding, WGTL signed off for good at sunset, December 25, 1992. The tower was dismantled two years later. Fred H. Whitley moved to Las Vegas, Nevada. The WGTL license was cancelled and its call letters were deleted by the FCC in April 1996.

== Reuse of the frequency and call sign ==
Radio station WGHC, formerly licensed in Clayton, Georgia, changed its community of license to Mount Holly, North Carolina, in 2009. When the move occurred, the station also changed broadcast frequencies from 1370 kHz to 870 kHz, the dial position formerly occupied by WGTL. The new call letters for the relocated station are WTCG.

The WGTL letters are returning to a station in La Grange, North Carolina, in June 2026.
