= WCRU =

Radio station in Dallas–Charlotte, North Carolina

- Dallas, North Carolina; United States
- Broadcast area: Charlotte metropolitan area
- Frequency: 960 kHz
- Branding: "The Truth"

Programming
- Format: Christian talk and teaching
- Affiliations: Salem Radio Network

Ownership
- Owner: Truth Broadcasting Corporation
- Sister stations: WTRU, WDRU, WLES, KUTR

History
- First air date: January 1, 1963; 63 years ago
- Former call signs: WAAK (1963–2002); WZRH (2002–2008)

Technical information
- Licensing authority: FCC
- Facility ID: 8503
- Class: B
- Power: 10,000 watts (day); 500 watts (night)
- Transmitter coordinates: 35°18′3.00″N 81°10′13.00″W
- Translators: 98.5 W253CV (Davidson, North Carolina); 105.7 W289BO (Pineville, North Carolina)

Links
- Public license information: Public file; LMS
- Website: TruthNetwork.com/station/WCRU

WCRU (960 kHz) is an AM radio station licensed to Dallas, North Carolina and serving the Charlotte metropolitan area. The station broadcasts a Christian talk and teaching radio format and is owned by the Truth Broadcasting Corporation. WCRU carries a mix of national and local pastors. National hosts include Charles Stanley, John MacArthur, Chuck Swindoll and Adrian Rogers.

By day, WCRU is powered at 10,000 watts. But at night, to protect other stations on 960 AM, WCRU greatly reduces power to 500 watts. A directional antenna is used at all times. The radio studios and transmitter are on Robinson-Clemmer Road in Dallas. Programming is also heard on two FM translator stations: W253CV 98.5 in Davidson, North Carolina, and W289BO 105.7 in Pineville, North Carolina.

== History ==
=== Early years ===
On January 1, 1963, the station first signed on with the call sign WAAK. The original city of license was Concord with 1,000 watts daytime and nighttime.

Fred Whitley, owner of WGTL in neighboring Kannapolis had applied for this frequency as a daytime-only station in Dallas to keep new competition out of his market. He won the construction permit for the station in Dallas, took the call letters WAAK off the top of the Federal Communications Commission (FCC) call sign list, refurbished WGTL's studio, buying the audio board from WSJS-TV, and put the old WGTL console in Dallas.

=== Top 40 Era ===
William E. Rumple was the Chief Engineer of the station for the entire time that Fred Whitley owned it. Whitley ran the station on a break-even basis for about 25 years. In the mid-1980s he sold it to the Marlow Brothers from New Jersey.

The new ownership made sweeping changes to the station, switching it from Easy Listening and Middle of the Road music, which aired during the Whitley years, to an Adult Top 40 sound. Another tower was added to allow the station to broadcast at night.

The establishment of several Top 40 stations in the Charlotte market eroded the listenership of WAAK. By 1990, the station was sold again and moved to a Christian radio format. Several ownership changes took place over the next decade.

=== Zybek Media and WZRH ===
In December 2002, WAAK was sold to The Zybek Media Group. Zybek flipped it to a talk radio format. The call letters were changed to WZRH with the moniker "The Z-Monster". The new owners immediately filed for a power increase in an attempt to place a stronger signal over the city of Charlotte. The initials ZRH of WZRH stood for Zachary Richard Howerton, son of owners Rick and Beth Howerton.

As Rick's on-going health problems continued to worsen, broadcast duties were given to Brian O'Brian, until the station was sold. Because of the increase in power, there was a great deal interest in the purchase of the station. The station was sold in mid-2004. Jim Huggins assumed general manager duties and hosted the morning drive time show for approximately a year until the format was changed from talk to Christian radio by Truth Broadcasting.

=== Truth Broadcasting and WCRU ===
Two years later, the station was sold yet again to Truth Broadcasting of Winston-Salem. On May 21, 2007, the station began airing Christian talk and teaching programs 24/7. In early 2008, the station's call letters were changed to WCRU to match the call letters and programming format of Truth Broadcasting's other AM stations, WTRU in the Piedmont Triad and WDRU in the Research Triangle.

Truth Broadcasting added two FM translators in Davidson and Pineville. These not only provide an option for listeners who prefer FM radio, but fills in the gaps when the main signal must reduce power at sunset; WCRU's nighttime signal is effectively limited to Gaston County.

== Translators ==
| Call sign | Frequency | City of license | FID | ERP (W) | HAAT | Class | FCC info |
|---|---|---|---|---|---|---|---|
| W253CV | (98.5 MHz) FM | Davidson, North Carolina | 202844 | 100 watts | 50.3 m (165 ft) | D | LMS |
| W289BO | (105.7 MHz) FM | Pineville, North Carolina | 147999 | 250 watts | 129.6 m (425 ft) | D | LMS |
