= WBRF =

- Galax, Virginia; United States
- Broadcast area: Southwestern Virginia; Southside Virginia; Piedmont Triad
- Frequency: 98.1 MHz
- Branding: Classic Country 98-1

Programming
- Format: Classic Country; Bluegrass; Americana
- Affiliations: CBS News Radio; MRN Radio; PRN Radio; Virginia News Network

Ownership
- Owner: Blue Ridge Radio, Inc.
- Sister stations: WKBA

History
- First air date: December 15, 1961
- Former call signs: WBOB-FM (1961–1985)
- Call sign meaning: Blue Ridge Family Radio

Technical information
- Licensing authority: FCC
- Facility ID: 5986
- Class: C
- ERP: 100,000 watts (horiz.); 96,000 watts (vert.)
- HAAT: 535 meters (1,755 ft)
- Transmitter coordinates: 36°33′34.0″N 80°49′25.0″W

Links
- Public license information: Public file; LMS
- Webcast: Listen live
- Website: classiccountry98.com

WBRF (98.1 FM) is a commercial radio station licensed to Galax, Virginia, United States, and serving Southwestern Virginia, Southside Virginia and the western Piedmont Triad, including Winston-Salem. It is owned and operated by Blue Ridge Radio, Inc., with studios on Poplar Knob Road in Galax. The transmitter is on Fishers Peak Road in Lowgap, North Carolina, near the Virginia border.

WBRF plays a mix of Classic country, Bluegrass and Americana music. Most programming is simulcast on WKBA 1550 and 93.1 in the Roanoke, Virginia, region.

== History ==
The station signed on the air at 5:15 p.m. on December 15, 1961. The original call sign was WBOB-FM, with a power of 6,000 watts. WBOB-FM shared studios with WBOB-AM (now WCGX).

WBOB-FM began its Country/Bluegrass/Americana format around the same time it was purchased by Blue Ridge Radio Inc. in April 1985. At the same time, the station switched its call sign to WBRF.

In 1990, the power was increased to 100,000 watts and the transmitter moved to Fishers Peak in Surry County, near the Virginia–North Carolina border.

On June 15, 2009, air personality Toby Young returned to radio with his "Aunt Eloise" character who was part of WTQR radio for 23 years.

Beginning in January 2023, WBRF started simulcasting most of its programming on co-owned WKBA 1550 and 93.1 in the Roanoke metropolitan area.

== Programming ==
WBRF-FM broadcasts the classic country music show, Blue Ridge Back Roads, live from the Rex Theater in Galax weekly. It also broadcasts from the Old Fiddler's Convention every August in Felt's Park, also in Galax.

The station is the flagship station of Wake Forest Demon Deacons football and men's basketball. However, since the station provides marginal coverage to much of the Triad, the Deacons also air their games on WPOL in Winston-Salem and simulcast partner WKEW in Greensboro.
