= XHMUG-FM =

Radio station in Mexicali, Baja California, Mexico

- Mexicali, Baja California; Mexico
- Frequency: 96.9 MHz

Programming
- Format: Regional Mexican

Ownership
- Owner: Grupo Radiorama; (Radio y Televisión Internacional, S.A. de C.V.)

History
- First air date: March 30, 1994 (concession)
- Former frequencies: 94.1 MHz
- Call sign meaning: Murguia, originally specified station location

Technical information
- Class: B
- ERP: 50 kW
- Transmitter coordinates: 32°25′27.2″N 115°17′57.6″W

Links
- Webcast: Listen live
- Website: radioramamexicali.com

XHMUG-FM is a Spanish radio station in Mexicali, Baja California, Mexico. The station was owned by Grupo Radiorama.

== History ==
XHMUG received its first concession on March 30, 1994. It was located in Murguia, slated to broadcast on 94.1 MHz and owned by Hector Renato Brassea Eguia. The station originally broadcast tropical music as La Sabrosita. It did not take the station long to move to Mexicali and 96.9 MHz. In 2003, the station adopted a more conventional regional Mexican format as Fuerza Latina. Beginning in 2009, Grupo Radio México operated XHMUG with its La Z brand.

In 2016, XHMUG changed to Radiorama and La Poderosa, the brand that previously had been used on XHMMF-FM 92.3. The next year, one of Radiorama's two Mexicali clusters was transferred to Grupo Larsa Comunicaciones, resulting in Larsa flipping XHMUG to its Toño adult hits format. Radiorama took back operation of the station in September 2018, resulting in the return of the La Poderosa name, but the format changed to classic hits in English and Spanish.

The station was simulcast on XED-AM 1050 beginning with its return to operation on September 29, 2019. The simulcast was broken on November 20, 2023, due to an acquisition of 1050 AM by Cadena RASA.
