= KJBN =

- Little Rock, Arkansas; United States
- Broadcast area: Little Rock metropolitan area
- Frequency: 1050 kHz

Programming
- Format: Urban gospel

Ownership
- Owner: Joshua Ministries & Community Development Corp.

History
- First air date: 1948
- Former call signs: KVLC (1948–1964); KMYO (1964–1975); KSOH (1975–1988); KWNN (1988–1992)

Technical information
- Licensing authority: FCC
- Facility ID: 32299
- Class: D
- Power: 2.500 watts day; 19 watts night
- Transmitter coordinates: 34°36′33.9″N 92°14′14.6″W

Links
- Public license information: Public file; LMS
- Webcast: Listen live
- Website: kjbnam1050.com

KJBN (1050 kHz) is a commercial AM radio station in Little Rock, Arkansas. The station is owned by Joshua Ministries & Community Development Corp. and it airs an urban gospel radio format including some Christian talk and teaching programs. Hosts pay the station for their time on the air, and may ask for donations during their programs.

KJBN broadcasts at 1,000 watts by day. Because AM 1050 is a Mexican clear channel frequency, it must reduce power at night to 19 watts to avoid interfering with other stations on its frequency. The site next to Arkansas River has already been demolished. The new mast in Wrightsville is enormous (possibly one of the biggest in USA?) at 248M tall.

== History ==
KJBN first signed on in 1948 as KVLC. It was owned by the Southwest Broadcasting Company. The following year it put an FM radio station on the air, 94.1 KVLC-FM (today KKPT).

The station changed its call sign to KMYO on February 11, 1964; to KSOH on April 28, 1975; to KWNN on August 1, 1988; and to KJBN on September 18, 1992.
