= XHRL-FM =

Radio station in Monterrey, Nuevo León

- Monterrey, Nuevo León; Mexico
- Frequency: 98.1 MHz
- Branding: Génesis 98.1

Programming
- Format: Pop

Ownership
- Owner: Núcleo Radio Monterrey; (Radio Laredo, S.A. de C.V.)
- Sister stations: XHCHL-FM, XEG-AM, XECT-AM

History
- First air date: April 11, 1972 (concession)
- Call sign meaning: Concessionaire Radio Laredo

Technical information
- Licensing authority: CRT
- Class: B1
- ERP: 25 kW
- HAAT: −183.4 meters (−602 ft)
- Transmitter coordinates: 25°38′48.8″N 100°18′46.7″W

Links
- Website: genesis981.com.mx

XHRL-FM is a radio station on 98.1 FM in Monterrey, Nuevo León. Mexico. The station is owned by Núcleo Radio Monterrey and carries a romantic/pop format known as Génesis 98.1.

== History ==
XHRL received its concession on April 11, 1972. It was operated by Multimedios Radio (in its beginnings as Organización Estrellas de Oro) and programmed a Spanish-language romantic music format known as Estéreo Recuerdo. In 1990 it was sold to Núcleo Radio Monterrey (a division of Núcleo Radio Mil in Nuevo León) and changed its name to Génesis 98.1, maintaining the romantic music format and adding pop in Spanish and later, English music was added.
