= O. Henry Hotel =

Hotel in Greensboro, North Carolina (1919–1979)

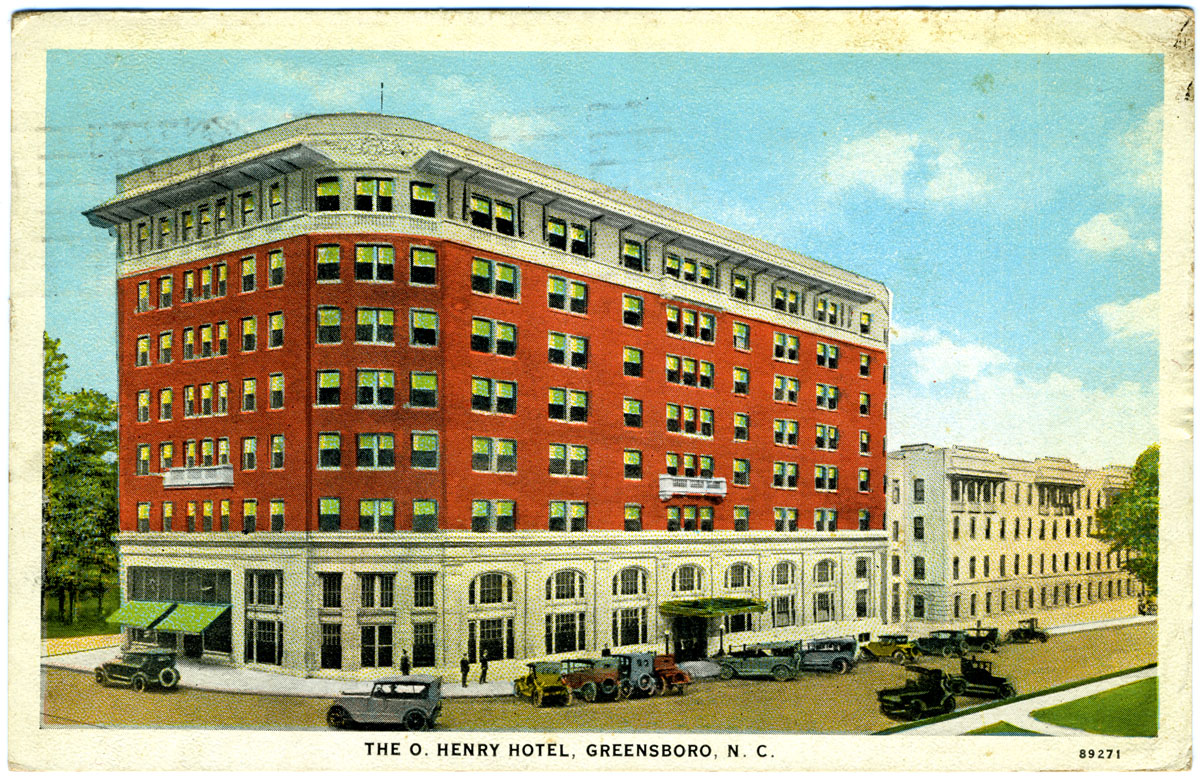
- The former O. Henry Hotel (pre-1979)
- Interactive map of the O. Henry Hotel area

General information
- Location: 624 Green Valley Road; Greensboro, North Carolina
- Coordinates: 36.08658264226833°N 79.8262084268494°W
- Opening: 1998
- Owner: Quaintance Weaver Restaurants and Hotels

Other information
- Number of rooms: 131
- Number of restaurants: 1

Website
- OHenryHotel.com

The O. Henry Hotel is a hotel in Greensboro, North Carolina.

The O. Henry is named after American writer and Greensboro native William Sydney Porter, whose pen name was O. Henry. The original hotel building, which was located in downtown Greensboro, was built in 1919 on the corner of Bellemeade and North Elm Street. It was the first of Greensboro's modern hotels, and one of the largest deluxe hotels in North Carolina, having over 300 rooms. The original hotel was closed in the 1960s. It was demolished in 1979 and a new hotel building was built in the late 1990s two miles from the original location. The O. Henry is privately owned by Quaintance-Weaver Restaurants & Hotels. The O. Henry is home to the restaurant the Green Valley Grill.
