= WKBA =

- Vinton, Virginia; United States
- Broadcast area: Roanoke, Virginia; Roanoke Valley
- Frequency: 1550 kHz
- Branding: Classic Country 93.1

Programming
- Format: Classic country

Ownership
- Owner: Brian Sizer; (Backroads Radio, LLC)

History
- First air date: October 9, 1961

Technical information
- Licensing authority: FCC
- Facility ID: 67180
- Class: D
- Power: 1,000 watts day
- Transmitter coordinates: 37°17′24.0″N 79°55′22.0″W
- Translator: 93.1 W226CN (Vinton)

Links
- Public license information: Public file; LMS

WKBA (1550 AM, "Classic Country 93.1") is a daytime only broadcast radio station licensed to Vinton, Virginia, serving Roanoke and the Roanoke Valley in Virginia. WKBA is owned and operated by Brian Sizer, through licensee Backroads Radio, LLC. It mostly simulcasts WBRF in Galax, Virginia.

Previously, WKBA was a religious station known as "The Ministry Station".

== Translator ==
WKBA also broadcasts on the following FM translator:

Broadcast translator for WKBA
Call sign	Frequency	City of license	FID	ERP (W)	Class	FCC info
W226CN	93.1 FM	Vinton, Virginia	200318	250 vertical	D	LMS

== Previous logo ==
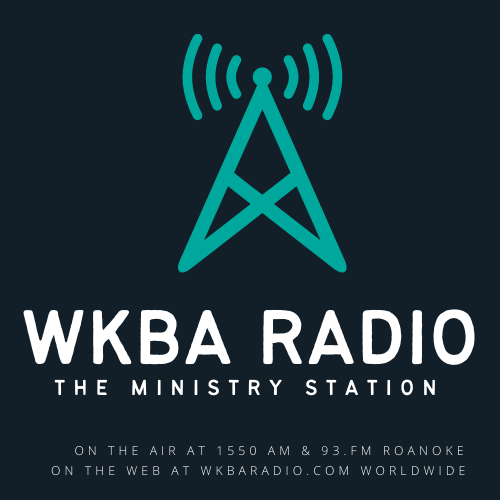
