= KUTR =

Radio station in Taylorsville–Salt Lake City, Utah

- Taylorsville, Utah; United States
- Broadcast area: Salt Lake City metropolitan area
- Frequency: 820 kHz

Programming
- Format: Contemporary Christian

Ownership
- Owner: Julie Epperson
- Sister stations: WTRU, WDRU, WCRU, WLES

History
- First air date: May 9, 2005
- Call sign meaning: K Utah Radio

Technical information
- Licensing authority: FCC
- Facility ID: 129372
- Class: B
- Power: 50,000 watts day and critical hours 2,500 watts night
- Transmitter coordinates: 40°19′48″N 112°4′9″W
- Translators: 95.3 K237FG (Pleasant Grove); 103.9 K280GX (Freeport)

Links
- Public license information: Public file; LMS
- Webcast: Listen Live
- Website: truthnetwork.com/station/kutr

KUTR (820 AM) is a Contemporary Christian formatted radio station in Salt Lake City Utah. The radio station is owned by Julie Epperson.

At its inception, KUTR was a female talk station featuring local and national talk programs. KUTR was owned by Bonneville International, who struggled to find a format for the station. Due to low ratings, Bonneville dropped the talk format and the station carried 24/7 LDS music, using the "Soft Sunday Sounds" branding of its sister-station, KSFI-FM. KUTR, when owned by Bonneville, acquired HD Radio for the station; however, the station was forced to turn HD off during the night to avoid interference with other stations. In 2008, the station was sold to Julie Epperson and began airing a Christian contemporary format, mixed with talk.

Today, KUTR under its new owner maintains the HD signal, but there have been times when it is not operating. As of November 30, 2018, KUTR is no longer broadcasting in HD.

KUTR is licensed to Taylorsville; however, the towers for the station are located outside Cedar Fort.

== Translators ==
In addition to AM 820, KUTR can be heard also on FM. The information is listed below.

Call sign	Frequency	City of license	FID	ERP (W)	HAAT	Class	FCC info
K237FG	95.3 FM	Pleasant Grove, Utah	88622	220 watts	2,849 m (9,347 ft)	D	LMS
K280GX	103.9 FM	Freeport, Utah	202843	250 watts	85.3 m (280 ft)	D	LMS
