= WMNZ =

- Montezuma, Georgia; United States
- Broadcast area: Macon County, Georgia
- Frequency: 1050 kHz

Programming
- Format: Country music

Ownership
- Owner: Buck Creek Music LLC.

History
- First air date: 1961
- Call sign meaning: Montezuma

Technical information
- Licensing authority: FCC
- Facility ID: 39558
- Class: D
- Power: 250 watts day 41 watts night
- Transmitter coordinates: (32.2979040, -84.0340356)32°17′53.00″N 84°2′2.00″W

Links
- Public license information: Public file; LMS

WMNZ (1050 AM) is a radio station broadcasting a country music format. Licensed to Montezuma, Georgia, United States. The station is currently owned by Buck Creek Music LLC.
