= WHLQ =

Radio station in Lawrenceville, Virginia

- Lawrenceville, Virginia; United States
- Broadcast area: Brunswick County, Virginia
- Frequency: 105.5 MHz
- Branding: Hot Joy Radio

Programming
- Format: Black Gospel; Urban Contemporary

Ownership
- Owner: Ilmar and Gerardo Ruiz; (Hosanna Christian Media, Inc.)

History
- First air date: September 1, 1991
- Former call signs: WLES-FM (1989); WHFD (1989–2011); WHLQ (2011–2014); WVNC (2014–2015)

Technical information
- Licensing authority: FCC
- Facility ID: 72503
- Class: A
- ERP: 6,000 Watts
- HAAT: 47 meters (154 ft)
- Transmitter coordinates: 36°45′10.0″N 77°51′49.0″W

Links
- Public license information: Public file; LMS

WHLQ (105.5 FM) is a Black Gospel and Urban Contemporary formatted broadcast radio station licensed to Lawrenceville, Virginia, serving Lawrenceville and Brunswick County, Virginia. WHLQ is owned and operated by Ilmar and Gerardo Ruiz, through licensee Hosanna Christian Media, Inc.

== History ==
=== Pre-broadcast and launch ===
William Carlton Link and Thurman Louis Hardgrove, Sr. both applied for a new FM station for Lawrenceville, Virginia, in early 1988. Link already owned an AM station, WLES, in Lawrenceville. The Federal Communications Commission (FCC) held a hearing regarding the matter on January 14, 1988. More than two months later, on March 31, Link's application was approved, with the station to broadcast at 98.9 MHz. During the week of April 20, 1989, the FCC assigned the new station the WLES-FM call sign. The station launched on September 1, 1991, airing country and bluegrass music. During the week of November 30, the station call sign changed to WHFD.

=== History since launch ===
On November 12, 1992, the FCC announced that WHFD would move from 98.9 to 105.5, where it remains. The move took place on January 15, 1993. The station added gospel music to its format in 1995.

Norfolk, Virginia-based Willis Broadcasting Corporation bought WHFD and sister station WLES from Link on March 22, 1999, for $350,000. Almost a year later, on January 10, 2000, sister-station WLES was sold to Chesapeake-Portsmouth Broadcasting Corporation for $150,000. In 2001, WHFD switched from a hybrid country/bluegrass/gospel music format to solely gospel.

WHFD and South Boston-based WHLF were to be sold to J&J Broadcasting Inc. for $250,000 on November 11, 2002, but for unknown reasons the sale did not take place. Station general manager Katrina Chase purchased WHFD, under the company name Lawrenceville Christian, for $100,000 on April 10, 2005.

On February 9, 2011, WHFD was placed into receivership due to a $200,000 debt owned to a Woodstock, Virginia-based law firm. The station fell silent on March 9, 2011, returning to the air in early 2012. Todd Fowler of Fowler Media Consulting, LLC took over operations of the station on March 30, 2011. On July 18, 2011, the station's call sign was changed from WHFD to WHLQ. WHLQ was sold by Fowler to Jimmy Johnson of North Carolina on May 16, 2012, for $75,000. The sale closed on November 7, 2012.

Once again, on April 14, 2014, the station was up for sale, this time to Lawrenceville resident Jeff Davis, who, under the company name Imperial Broadcasting Company, LLC, purchased WHLQ from Johnson for $199,000.

Johnson, while still owner of WHLQ, filed to raise the station's transmitting tower height from 47 meters to 100 meters on May 9, 2014. The station's tower will remain in the same location and the wattage will remain the same as well. On July 7, 2014, the station's call sign was again changed, from WHLQ to WVNC.

The sale from Johnson to Davis closed on July 14, 2014. Four days later, WVNC fell silent to make "changes [with] equipment and programming". A month previously, on May 20, a post on the station's new Facebook page alerted listeners that the station would take a new format of Conservative News/Talk programs.

Davis said, in an interview on August 5 with the Brunswick Times-Gazette, that he hoped to have the station on the air "by the second week of August". He also said "a morning show featuring local guests" will be featured.

WVNC returned to the air on August 19, 2014. The station, however, returned with a music format due to technical problems with the station's satellite dish. The news/talk format was delayed until the satellite dish was repaired. On September 22, 2014, the station debuted its Conservative News/Talk format. The station began streaming its programming online at December 16, 2014, but stopped four days later.

On December 20, 2014, the station began airing Christmas music. Owner Jeff Davis began the process of selling the station back to previous owner Jimmy Johnson, on January 6, 2014. Johnson will operate the station, under the Brunswick County Broadcasting, Inc., with two other persons, John Trent and Terry Suggs. Trent's law firm filed suit against the station's previous owners in 2011.

The sale represents a cancellation of debt, in the amount of $179,100, still owned by Davis to Johnson. As part of the agreement, the station's callsign will change back to WHLQ. The two companies also entered into a time brokerage agreement, allowing Brunswick to begin operating the station. The agreement went into effect on January 1, 2015. On January 13, 2015, the station's callsign changed to WHLQ. The sale of WHLQ was closed on April 9, 2015.

A little under seven months later, on October 27, 2015, Brunswick County Broadcasting, Inc. began the process to sell WHLQ. The buyer, this time around, was Chesapeake-based Ronnie D. Joyner Ministries, Inc. The station was sold for $149,000, and the translation was consummated on January 6, 2016. At this time, translator station W236AD is not included in the sale.

Effective November 7, 2019, Ronnie D. Joyner Ministries sold WHLQ to Ilmar & Gerardo Ruiz's Hosanna Christian Media, Inc. for $57,500.
