= WSMT =

- Sparta, Tennessee; United States
- Broadcast area: Cookeville
- Frequency: 1050 kHz
- Branding: 105.5 The One

Programming
- Format: Contemporary Christian

Ownership
- Owner: Peg Broadcasting, LLC

History
- First air date: April 26, 1953

Technical information
- Licensing authority: FCC
- Facility ID: 3336
- Class: D
- Power: 950 watts day 178 watts night
- Transmitter coordinates: 35°57′16.2″N 85°28′36.9″W
- Translator: 105.5 W288DO (Sparta)

Links
- Public license information: Public file; LMS
- Website: 1055theone.com

WSMT (1050 AM, "105.5 The One") is a radio station broadcasting a Contemporary Christian music format. Licensed to Sparta, Tennessee, United States, the station serves the Cookeville area. The station is currently owned by Peg Broadcasting, LLC and features programming from Salem Radio Network.

On December 26, 2025, WSMT changed their format from southern gospel to contemporary Christian, branded as "105.5 The One".
