= WTCA =

- Plymouth, Indiana; United States
- Frequency: 1050 kHz
- Branding: Giant FM

Programming
- Format: Hot adult contemporary
- Affiliations: ABC News Radio

Ownership
- Owner: Kathy Bottorff and Jim Bottorff; (Community Service Broadcasters, Inc.)
- Operator: 3 Towers Broadcasting, LLC

History
- First air date: 1964

Technical information
- Licensing authority: FCC
- Facility ID: 13002
- Class: B
- Power: 250 watts
- Transmitter coordinates: 41°19′6.16″N 86°18′41.02″W
- Translator: 106.1 W291BQ (Plymouth)

Links
- Public license information: Public file; LMS
- Webcast: Listen live
- Website: www.am1050.com

WTCA (1050 AM) is a radio station broadcasting a hot adult contemporary format. Licensed to Plymouth, Indiana, United States, the station is owned by Kathy and Jim Bottorff, through licensee Community Service Broadcasters, Inc.

== Translator ==
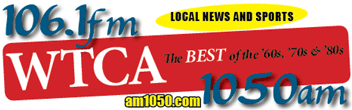
Former logo

Call sign	Frequency	City of license	FID	ERP (W)	Class	Transmitter coordinates	FCC info
W291BQ	106.1 FM	Plymouth, Indiana	147705	250	D	41°20′30.2″N 86°18′37″W	LMS
