= WTWG =

- Columbus, Mississippi; United States
- Broadcast area: Golden Triangle
- Frequency: 1050 kHz
- Branding: WTWG 1050 am

Programming
- Format: Gospel music

Ownership
- Owner: CBN Communications, LLC

History
- First air date: July 13, 1950 (first license granted)

Technical information
- Licensing authority: FCC
- Facility ID: 64363
- Class: D
- Power: 1,000 watts (day); 48 watts (night)
- Transmitter coordinates: 33°30′36.5″N 88°24′45.7″W
- Translator: (96.9 MHz) W245DM (Columbus)

Links
- Public license information: Public file; LMS
- Webcast: Listen live
- Website: http://wtwgam1050.com

WTWG (1050 AM) is a radio station licensed to Columbus, Mississippi. The station airs a Gospel music format and is owned by CBN Communications, LLC.
