= WWGB =

Spanish-language Christian radio station in Washington, D.C.

- Indian Head, Maryland; United States
- Broadcast area: Washington metropolitan area
- Frequency: 1030 kHz
- Branding: Poder 1030 (Power 1030)

Programming
- Language: Spanish
- Format: Christian radio

Ownership
- Owner: Good Body Media, LLC

History
- First air date: June 1986
- Last air date: July 17, 2026
- Former call signs: WBZE (1984–1989); WNTL (1989–1997)
- Call sign meaning: Washington Good Body

Technical information
- Licensing authority: FCC
- Facility ID: 71245
- Class: D
- Power: 50,000 watts daytime only
- Transmitter coordinates: 38°33′56.4″N 76°49′3.9″W

Links
- Public license information: Public file; LMS
- Webcast: Listen live

WWGB was a broadcast radio station licensed to Indian Head, Maryland, serving the Washington metropolitan area. WWGB was owned and operated by Good Body Media, LLC. It only operated during daytime hours, in order to protect the nighttime signal of WBZ in Boston.

== History ==
The station was first licensed as WBZE, with the call sign chosen to honor WBZ in Boston; the station's sign-off message at the time encouraged listeners to stay tuned to the frequency to continue listening to WBZ. WBZE played Black gospel music.

In 1989, the call letters were changed to WNTL ("international") and the station moved to brokered programming largely focused at an Arab-American audience. The station went bankrupt in 1996, and that spring it was recorded as playing oldies in simulcast with WINX (1600 AM). Mortenson Broadcasting purchased the station later in the year and instituted Christian programming in Spanish. In 2002, Mortenson sold to Good Body Media, a group consisting of the ownership of New York City-market television station WMBC-TV, for $2.9 million.

The station went silent on July 17, 2026, citing financial issues. The license was cancelled on August 10.
