= KSHP =

Radio station in North Las Vegas, Nevada

- North Las Vegas, Nevada; United States
- Broadcast area: Las Vegas Valley
- Frequency: 1400 kHz

Programming
- Format: Sports; brokered programming
- Affiliations: Sports Byline USA

Ownership
- Owner: William H. Pollack; (Las Vegas Broadcasting LLC)

History
- First air date: 1954
- Former call signs: KBMI (1954–1978); KVEG (1978–1986); KFMS (1986–1995); KKDD (1995–1996)
- Call sign meaning: K-Shop

Technical information
- Licensing authority: FCC
- Facility ID: 55502
- Class: C
- Power: 1,000 watts
- Transmitter coordinates: 36°12′38.9″N 115°9′50″W
- Translator: 107.1 K296HP (North Las Vegas)

Links
- Public license information: Public file; LMS
- Webcast: Listen live
- Website: www.kshp.com

KSHP (1400 AM) is a commercial radio station licensed to North Las Vegas, Nevada, broadcasting a brokered format focused on sports. It is owned by William H. Pollack, with the license held by Las Vegas Broadcasting LLC. The studios and offices are on South Jones Boulevard at West Sahara Avenue in Las Vegas.

KSHP is powered at 1,000 watts using a non-directional antenna. Programming is also heard on 99-watt FM translator K296HP at 107.1 MHz.

== History ==
The station first signed on the air in 1954. Its original call sign was KBMI, licensed to Henderson, Nevada. The station originally broadcast with 250 watts. The studios were on South First Street in Las Vegas.

On May 10, 1978, the station changed its call letters to KVEG, standing for "Vegas". It changed its city of license to North Las Vegas in 1980.

On March 10, 1986, the call sign was changed to KFMS. The call letters KRAM were assigned on February 1, 1988, but were not used.

In the mid-1990s, KFMS became a children's radio station, switching its call sign to KKDD on April 26, 1995. It joined the national children's network Aahs World Radio. It switched to KSHP on October 29, 1996. Also in 1996, the station began broadcasting from a new, less complex non-directional site amidst warehouses in North Las Vegas.

KSHP has previously been part of the radio networks for the Arizona Diamondbacks, the Las Vegas Silver Bandits, the Denver Broncos, the BYU Cougars Sports Network and the Dallas Cowboys.

KSHP formerly ran a home shopping format, known as "K-SHOP, the Radio Shopping Show". Over time, as the internet has taken larger pieces of the direct to consumer sector, the format evolved into a mixture of sports and brokered programming.

== Programming ==
KSHP carries sports shows from Sports Byline USA. It also carries play-by-play from USC Trojans football and the Los Angeles Rams.
