= Qué Pasa (newspaper) =

- Type: Weekly newspaper
- Format: Broadsheet
- Owner: Qué Pasa Media
- Publisher: Jose Isasi
- Editor: Karina Neyra
- Language: Spanish
- Headquarters: Winston-Salem, NC Raleigh, NC Charlotte, NC
- Circulation: 17,683 Research Triangle; 17,663 Piedmont; 17,065 Charlotte
- Website: quepasamedia.com

Qué Pasa (from the Spanish, what's up?) is a Spanish-language newspaper circulated in North Carolina, USA. Its primary audience is the Latino community in the state. The paper maintains distinct editions for the Piedmont, Charlotte, and Research Triangle areas of the state. This free paper is distributed mostly at restaurant and grocery locations.
