= WBIG (AM) =

Simulcast of WTOB Winston-Salem
- Greensboro, North Carolina; United States
- Broadcast area: Piedmont Triad
- Frequency: 1470 kHz
- Branding: Classic Hits WTOB

Programming
- Format: Classic hits
- Affiliations: Compass Media Networks; Premiere Networks; Westwood One; Carolina Thunderbirds; Charlotte Hornets

Ownership
- Owner: Richard Miller; (Twin City Broadcasting Company, LLC)
- Sister stations: WTOB; WCOG

History
- First air date: 1999
- Former call signs: WWBG (1999–2026)
- Call sign meaning: homage to the original WBIG

Technical information
- Licensing authority: FCC
- Facility ID: 67831
- Class: B
- Power: 10,000 watts (day); 5,000 watts (night)
- Transmitter coordinates: 36°9′1.49″N 79°54′47.13″W

Links
- Public license information: Public file; LMS
- Webcast: Listen live
- Website: www.wtob980.com

WBIG (1470 AM) is an American radio station licensed to serve Greensboro, North Carolina, United States. The station, launched in 1999 as a replacement for the original WBIG, is owned by Richard Miller's Twin City Broadcasting Company, LLC. WBIG broadcasts a classic hits music format to the Greensboro–High Point area, simulcast from co-owned WTOB in Winston-Salem.

== History of WBIG ==
The original call sign of WWBG and post-2026 call sign of WBIG are a tribute to the prior occupant of this frequency in Greensboro, WBIG, which broadcast from the city for 60 years. Established in 1925 in Charlotte and moved to Greensboro the next year by founder Wayne M. Nelson, the station became the first broadcasting property of Jefferson-Pilot in 1934 and affiliated with CBS. It continued as the most popular station in Greensboro in decades, though in later years the move of music audiences to FM and the growth of the radio market outside of Greensboro proper put it at a severe disadvantage. Jefferson-Pilot shut the station down on November 20, 1986; the land was sold five years later for the construction of a Lowe's home improvement store.

== History of WWBG ==
On December 9, 1994, Walt Cockerham announced that the former WBIG would return to the air with its old frequency, but the call sign was no longer available. (A station in Aurora, Illinois, would adopt the WBIG call sign in 1991.) During the year after WKEW changed from news/talk, Truth Broadcasting bought several stations in the Greensboro area, including the one that would be called WWBG, the call sign that the new station was assigned by the Federal Communications Commission on August 21, 1992. Truth Broadcasting planned to do what WKEW had done. This meant news, talk, sports and community affairs relating to Greensboro. On November 1, 1999, Dunn and Bray returned to 1470 AM. Dunn said, "It's like being home. We've got the old morning crew back together."

The news/talk format only lasted until January 1, 2002, because, program director David Albright said, it was not profitable and a number of Spanish-speaking people wanted a radio station of their own. "La Movidita" was already airing on WTOB (1380 AM) in Winston-Salem.

In 2003, Truth Broadcasting stopped selling time to La Movidita, which moved to its former home WSGH. Que Pasa moved from WSGH to WWBG and WTOB.

WTOB began airing separate programming in 2013.

In December 2020, WTOB 980 AM/96.7 FM began simulcasting on the 1470 AM frequency. During simulcast, the station call sign WWBG has been retained, and the transmitter power has been maintained at 10,000 watts daytime and 5,000 watts at night. WTOB currently has an oldies music format and is being simulcast on WWBG.

In 2026, WWBG's owner paid to acquire the WBIG call sign from the owner of the Illinois station.
