= WTOB (AM) =

- Winston-Salem, North Carolina; United States
- Broadcast area: Piedmont Triad
- Frequency: 980 kHz
- Branding: Classic Hits WTOB

Programming
- Format: Classic hits
- Affiliations: Compass Media Networks; Premiere Networks; Westwood One; Carolina Thunderbirds; Winston-Salem State Rams

Ownership
- Owner: Richard Miller, Robert Scarborough and Richard Parker; (Southern Broadcast Media LLC)
- Sister stations: WBIG; WCOG

History
- First air date: October 28, 1950
- Former call signs: WAAA (1950–2006); WTIX (2006–2009); WEGO (2009–2016)
- Call sign meaning: tobacco

Technical information
- Licensing authority: FCC
- Facility ID: 40996
- Class: D
- Power: 1,300 watts (day); 49 watts (night)
- Transmitter coordinates: 36°6′40.49″N 80°14′35.18″W
- Translator: 96.7 W244EM (Winston-Salem)
- Repeater: 1470 WBIG (Greensboro)

Links
- Public license information: Public file; LMS
- Webcast: Listen live
- Website: wtob980.com

WTOB (980 kHz) is an AM radio station licensed to Winston-Salem, North Carolina, United States, which serves the Piedmont Triad area. The station is owned by Richard Miller and Robert Scarborough, Ken Hauser and Richard Parker through licensee Southern Broadcast Media LLC, and airs a classic hits format. Its programming is also simulcast on WBIG (1470 AM) in Greensboro.

== History ==
=== WAAA ===
WAAA was owned by white businessman Roger Page when it first began broadcasting in 1950. This was rare at this time in the Deep South that a white owner would own and an operate a mainly black radio station. On the afternoon of October 28, 1950, Larry L. Williams, an African-American, signed on WAAA. The first program broadcast was a football game between Morgan State University and A & T State University. The game was announced from the stadium by Togo West Sr. (principal of Atkins High School) while Larry L. Williams conducted station operations. On the morning of October 29, 1950, Williams signed on WAAA for the first full day of broadcasting as the second radio station in the state (after WGIV in 1947) specifically targeting an African American audience. WAAA was believed to be the third black radio station in the United States, preceded by WDIA in Memphis and WERD in Atlanta. WAAA was also the first black-owned station in North Carolina.

Prior to becoming the General Manager of WAAA, Larry L. Williams gave play-by-play action of the Winston-Salem State University football and basketball games; becoming known as the "Voice of the Rams." Larry L. Williams went on to become General Manager of radio stations in Alabama, South Carolina, and Charlotte, North Carolina. He returned to his home in Asheville, North Carolina, in 2002 to become General Manager of WOXL-FM. Larry L. Williams, a pioneer in radio, retired in 2008 at the age of 90. Oscar "Daddy-Oh" Alexander was the station's best-known DJ. He was described as "a jive-talking hipster who radiated cool while spinning hits from Motown and Stax."

Jazz pianist Keith Byrd, who once lived near him, described Alexander this way:

He had a voice that was like gravel going through molasses. You know what I'm saying? It was smooth and sweet. He was a good spirit, a great character and he played the hottest songs. He was almost like the black Wolfman Jack in this area.

Alexander left the station in 1962 after five years. Annie Bell Bowman played gospel music on the station. Anita "Boss Lady" Dean was a DJ for six years.

Media Broadcasting Corp. bought WAAA in 1971. Mutter D. Evans bought WAAA from Media Broadcasting Corp. in 1979 for US$1.04 million (equivalent to US$461.35 million in 2025), making her the youngest and second African American woman to own a broadcast property in the United States. At the time, the station had 14 employees and was doing well financially considering its size but, in 1988, WAAA filed for Chapter 11. WAAA continued to broadcast but faced increasing competition from larger stations. But WAAA was unique in its service to the community, playing gospel music, jazz and rhythm and blues and broadcasting news, daily obituary reports, and Sunday religious programming.

On July 9, 2001, deputies locked the doors to the WAAA studios on Indiana Avenue because court documents showed rent had not been paid since 1997. Evans and the community worked to bring the station back, and a web site was introduced in January 2002. On July 5, 2002, WAAA returned to the air with new studios and a limited schedule, with Evans claiming to have solved her problems and intending to return to a full schedule as soon as possible. As recently as 2006, WAAA sponsored Martin Luther King Jr. Day celebrations.

GHB Broadcasting purchased the station. For several years WAAA, later called WTIX, aired the programming of WIST-FM, which played adult standards and then classic country. The switch to sports talk took place May 5, 2008.

=== WEGO ===
Truth Broadcasting completed its purchase of the station January 6, 2010. The call letters changed to WEGO and the format changed to Spanish Christian. Programming included syndicated shows plus local programming from Iglesia Luz Admirable Assemblies of God.

The Spanish format was short-lived however, as on July 4, 2012, new owners Ralph Epperson Broadcasting Inc. switched the format from Spanish back to English. The station now became news/talk and featured many of the same local personalities who worked at WSJS. The Eagle signed former longtime WSJS newsman Smith Patterson to be the news director and morning show host. Bill Flynn (formerly of WMAG and WPTI) joined Patterson on air on the morning show. WEGO became the flagship radio station of Wake Forest University Demon Deacons football and basketball. Syndicated hosts include Dennis Prager, Michael Savage, Laura Ingraham and Mike Gallagher. On January 5, 2015, WEGO added Bill Bennett and shortened Flynn's show, taking it off entirely on some Mondays to air Bennett and Ingraham in their entirety. WTOB Radio, a beloved station in Winston-Salem, has a rich history of transformation and revival. After being a Spanish station for several years, WTOB was leased by Jerry Holt from Davidson Media in 2012. This lease marked the beginning of significant changes, particularly with the involvement of Daniel Williard in 2013.

=== WTOB ===
At noon EST on December 18, 2015, WEGO switched to classic hits from the late 1950s to the late 1970s, with the first song "Fly Like an Eagle" by Steve Miller Band, and began calling itself "Classic Hits WTOB". After new owners changed WTOB (1380 AM) in November, employees of the former WTOB formed Southern Broadcast Media LLC to license a new station. Ingraham, Bennett and Savage have been dropped, but Wake Forest sports remain. Mark Richards, one of those in charge, said, "We’re all about live, community radio and bringing back a radio style that was almost forgotten."

Southern Broadcast Media consummated the purchase of WEGO from Truth Broadcasting effective June 6, 2016, at a price of US$164,000 (equivalent of US$220,000 in 2025). On November 15, 2016, application was made to the Federal Communications Commission for WEGO to change its callsign to WTOB. The call letter change was made effective Tuesday, November 22, 2016. On that day at 08:00 EST, announcers Mark Richards, Randy Simpson, and Bob Scarborough announced the change of callsigns. Also that morning, Richards and Scott Brand, General Manager of the Carolina Thunderbirds Hockey Club announced that WTOB would be the official broadcast partner and flagship station for the Thunderbirds Hockey team and will broadcast all 56 games of the Thunderbirds beginning in November 2017.

In response to a September 2017 format change by WSJS, WTOB began local newscasts on November 13, 2017. Former WSJS news director Ed Skurka became news director began newscasts every half-hour in the morning and at noon. Greg Rice would do afternoon newscasts. WTOB moved its studios to Trade Street.

== Translator ==
Call sign	Frequency	City of license	FID	ERP (W)	Class	Transmitter coordinates	FCC info
W244EM	96.7 FM	Winston-Salem, North Carolina	201392	65	D	36°5′53.4″N 80°14′37.1″W	LMS
