= WWNT =

- Winston-Salem, North Carolina; United States
- Broadcast area: Winston-Salem, North Carolina; Forsyth County, North Carolina
- Frequency: 1380 kHz
- Branding: Activa Network

Programming
- Format: Silent, was Spanish language

Ownership
- Owner: Delmarva Educational Association
- Sister stations: WEAL

History
- First air date: April 22, 1947
- Former call signs: WTOB (1947–2015)
- Former frequencies: 710 kHz (1947–1955)
- Call sign meaning: It was originally used from 1450 AM in Dothan, Alabama, which meant “News/Talk”

Technical information
- Licensing authority: FCC
- Facility ID: 59270
- Class: B
- Power: 5,000 watts daytime; 2,500 watts nighttime
- Transmitter coordinates: 36°8′53″N 80°19′11″W

Links
- Public license information: Public file; LMS
- Webcast: WWNT Webstream
- Website: WWNT Online

WWNT is a Spanish language formatted broadcast radio station licensed to Winston-Salem, North Carolina, United States, serving Winston-Salem and Forsyth County, North Carolina. WWNT is owned by Delmarva Educational Association. As of August 1, 2018, WWNT is silent.

== History ==
=== 1947 sign-on ===
The station began as WTOB (stands for World's Tobacco Capital), a 1,000-watt daytimer on April 22, 1947 on 710 kHz and licensed to Winston-Salem. WTOB began as an affiliate of the Mutual Broadcasting System.

=== 1950s-1970s: Top 40 days ===
By 1955, WTOB had moved to 1380 kHz and upgraded from a daytime to a full-time station with 5,000 watts days and 1,000 watts night. It also had a sister television station: WTOB-TV, which operated from 1953 to 1957.

WTOB was a Top 40 station during the 1950s, 1960s and 1970s. George Lee was one of "The Good Guys". Other popular DJs were Dick Bennick, The Flying Dutchman, and Rick Dees, who worked at WTOB, WCOG and WKIX when the stations were owned by Southern Broadcasting.

Shortly after his retirement in 2015 from WEGO, a Winston-Salem Journal story said that when Smith Patterson went to work at WTOB, his name was the same as John Johnson and he was told not to use that name. Several days later, he got behind a Patterson Smith oil truck and decided on the name he would use through his 45-year career.

=== The 1980s and 1990s: changes in formats ===
In the 1980s and 1990s, the station played adult standards in addition to airing local and regional sports events, talk programs such as Ludlow Porch and Marge at Large, and other local content such as a barbershop music program. At the end of the 1980s, most of the station's music came from Satellite Radio Networks. The station later switched to CNN radio news. Truth Broadcasting eventually purchased the station and switched it to Christian talk, later airing the same programming as WCOG.

=== The 2000s: simulcasts and Spanish ===
On January 1, 2002, WWBG began airing the same programming as WTOB.

In 2003, Truth Broadcasting stopped selling time to La Movidita, which moved back to WSGH. Que Pasa moved from WSGH to WTOB and WWBG. This was done even though the Spring 2002 Arbitron results showed WTOB had its highest ratings since the change to Spanish programming. At some point not too long after this, Davidson Media purchased WTOB.

=== 2010s: back to English and back to Spanish ===
On April 1, 2013, WTOB switched back to all-English, dropped all Spanish programming and flipped its format to Oldies (1950s-1970s and Carolina Beach Oldies). Jerry Holt leased the station from owner Davidson Media and was the general manager of WTOB as well as an on-air D.J. The station announced that it was moving its studios to 3rd Avenue in Winston-Salem. WTOB was based on the style and music that made it the top radio station in Winston-Salem in the 1960s and 1970s, and past jingles and sound effects were used. Among the disc jockeys were Curtis Lee, who was on WAIR in the 1960s.

Holt and Davidson Media could not agree on a new lease in 2014. WTOB was leased to Dan Williard, and Holt leased another station, WSMX. WTOB switched to a classic hits format on June 1. Speaking about the new format, program director Coyote Mush told the Winston-Salem Journal, "We’re the only station that does the Classic Hits format between Charlotte and Raleigh... Corporate radio has just ignored it."

In July 2015, TBLC Media purchased WTOB. In November 2015, TBLC changed the format to Spanish. The classic hits format remained on the station's website and moved first to WSMX and on December 18, 2015, at noon, to WEGO. Former WTOB employees formed Southern Broadcast Media LLC to license the new station.

On December 9, 2015, WTOB changed its callsign to WWNT. On November 15, 2016, TBLC Media consented to give the WTOB callsign to the owners of WEGO 980 AM, and as of November 22, 2016, WEGO became WTOB.

According to the FCC's Silent AM Broadcast Stations List, WWNT has been off the air since December 11, 2020.

Effective June 9, 2023, TBLC Media sold WWNT to Delmarva Educational Association for $15,000.

=== WTOB-TV ===
A sister television station, WTOB-TV, signed on the air on September 18, 1953. It was an ABC and DuMont affiliate. WTOB-TV operated on Channel 26. As with many early UHF stations, it faced signal problems and the fact that viewers had to purchase expensive UHF converters to see the signal. With the area already served by strong VHF stations like Greensboro's WFMY-TV and Winston-Salem's WSJS-TV, WTOB-TV was fighting a difficult battle. It signed off in 1957. Channel 26 now is WUNL-TV, the University of North Carolina television station serving Winston-Salem. It is not affiliated with WTOB.
