= XEG-AM =

Radio station in Monterrey, Nuevo León, Mexico

- Monterrey, Nuevo León; Mexico
- Broadcast area: Monterrey Metropolitan area
- Frequency: 1050 kHz
- Branding: La Ranchera de Monterrey

Programming
- Language: Spanish
- Format: Classic Ranchera

Ownership
- Owner: Núcleo Radio Monterrey; (La Voz de Norteamerica, S.A. de C.V.)
- Sister stations: XHCHL-FM, XHRL-FM, XECT-AM

History
- First air date: 1944

Technical information
- Licensing authority: CRT
- Class: A (clear-channel)
- Power: 100,000 watts
- Transmitter coordinates: 25°41′53.50″N 100°10′30.20″W

Links
- Website: larancherademonterrey.com.mx

XEG-AM (1050 kHz) is a Class A clear channel radio station in Monterrey, Nuevo León, Mexico. Its transmitter is atop Cerro de la Silla in Guadalupe, Nuevo León. XEG was known as a border blaster in the 1950s, 60s and 70s. It now uses the name La Ranchera de Monterrey and broadcasts a Classic Ranchera radio format.

XEG is one of a handful of North American AM stations to broadcast at 100,000 watts around the clock. No commercial AM stations in the U.S. or Canada run more than 50,000 watts. XEG is non-directional at night but uses a directional antenna by day.

== History ==
XEG received its concession on February 21, 1944. In 1950, the advertising time on XEG came under the control of Harold Schwartz of Chicago who also came to represent co-owned XERB 1090 AM in Tijuana/Rosarito, Baja California, the station made famous in the movie American Graffiti.

During the mid-and late 1970s, XEG (then at 150 kW power, directional north) was known for its nighttime English-language R&B/Soul music shows. For 4–6 hours per night, taped transcriptions from KGFJ (Los Angeles) disc jockeys made specifically for XEG were audible throughout much of the Southern, Southwestern and Midwestern U.S.

In the late 1970s, XEG's powerful nighttime signal attracted several U.S. ministries, including Billy James Hargis. But between programs, commercials occasionally offered suspicious-sounding medicines which promised to "cure cancer" and other illnesses. By 1982, XEG was known as "The Golden Gospel Giant".

The XEG mailing address announced on the air was antiquated: "Post Office Box 28, St. Louis, 66, Missouri." This was more than a decade after ZIP codes were introduced across the U.S. As of November 2014, QSL (reception report) cards were still mailed out from St. Louis.

AM radio waves are of a much lower acoustical quality than FM, but during hours of darkness the Earth’s ionosphere drops sharply, typically from an altitude of roughly 600 miles to 30 miles, and the much longer wave length of the AM transmissions causes them to be refracted off of that lowered layer so that they “skip” back to ground level several hundred miles away. Accordingly, that causes the border blaster stations like XEG to be valuable as a commercial advertising medium far from their transmitters on the south side of the US border. Depending on atmospheric conditions, multiple skips can result in acceptable night time AM reception as far north as Canada.
