= WTRU =

Radio station in Kernersville, North Carolina

Coordinates: 36°11′58″N 80°12′25″W

- Kernersville, North Carolina; United States
- Broadcast area: Piedmont Triad
- Frequency: 830 kHz
- Branding: The Truth Triad – AM 830 / FM 97.7 / 99.1

Programming
- Format: Christian talk and teaching

Ownership
- Owner: Truth Broadcasting

Technical information
- Licensing authority: FCC
- Facility ID: 63478
- Class: B
- Power: 50,000 watts (days); 10,000 watts (nights)

Links
- Public license information: Public file; LMS
- Website: www.truthnetwork.com/station/wtru/

WTRU (830 kHz) is a commercial AM radio station licensed to Kernersville, North Carolina, and serving the Piedmont Triad. It is owned by Truth Broadcasting and carries a Christian talk and teaching radio format. Truth Broadcasting is owned by Stuart Epperson, Jr., son of Stuart Epperson, founder of Salem Communications. The station is the flagship of the "Truth Network", which includes WDRU in the Research Triangle, WCRU in Charlotte, WLES in Richmond, Virginia, and KUTR in Salt Lake City.

By day, WTRU transmits with 50,000 watts, the maximum for AM stations in the U.S., but 830 AM is a clear-channel frequency reserved for Class A station WCCO in Minneapolis, so WTRU must reduce power at night to 10,000 watts to avoid interfering with WCCO's signal. WTRU programming is heard on three FM translator stations in the region (see below).

== History ==
From 1956 until 1992, the call letters WTRU were assigned to the now silenced AM 1600 in Muskegon Heights, Michigan.

The 830 AM dial position in the Piedmont Triad was first assigned to WWMO in Eden, North Carolina, which featured a Southern gospel and preaching format. In 1995, WWMO was purchased by HMW Communications. The call letters were changed to WETR, and the station moved to the old Color Tile building on High Point Road in Greensboro, North Carolina. WETR offered a mix of "entertainment radio" programming that included talk radio such as The Fabulous Sports Babe and The Dr. Laura Program as well as beach music.

New towers were built outside Walkertown, North Carolina, to improve coverage of the entire Greensboro-High Point-Winston-Salem market. In 1997, Hearst-Argyle Television, owner of area NBC affiliate WXII-TV, bought the station and changed the call letters to WXII, and a news radio format was used that included audio from some WXII-TV news broadcasts.

Truth Broadcasting bought the station in June 2000 and, after a few weeks of silence, returned it to the air with the current format and call letters.

== Translators ==
In addition to the main station on 830 AM, WTRU is relayed by three FM translators.

Call sign	Frequency	City of license	FID	ERP (W)	HAAT	Class	FCC info
W249CN	97.7 FM	Clemmons, North Carolina	142855	250 watts	73.9 m (242 ft)	D	LMS
W249BZ	97.7 FM	Greensboro, North Carolina	154301	25 watts	51 m (167 ft)	D	LMS
W256DR	99.1 FM	High Point, North Carolina	202845	250 watts	129 m (423 ft)	D	LMS
