= WKEW =

Simulcast of WPOL Winston-Salem
- Greensboro, North Carolina; United States
- Broadcast area: Piedmont Triad
- Frequency: 1400 kHz
- Branding: The Light

Programming
- Format: Gospel music

Ownership
- Owner: Truth Broadcasting Corporation
- Sister stations: WPOL; WFMO

History
- First air date: February 6, 1942 (84 years ago)

Technical information
- Licensing authority: FCC
- Facility ID: 73156
- Class: C
- Power: 760 watts
- Transmitter coordinates: 36°3′42″N 79°47′35″W
- Translator: (96.3 MHz) W242CD (Greensboro)

Links
- Public license information: Public file; LMS
- Webcast: Listen Live
- Website: lightthetriad.com

WKEW (1400 AM) is a commercial radio station broadcasting a Gospel music radio format. Licensed to Greensboro, North Carolina, US, the station is owned by Truth Broadcasting Corporation. In Greensboro and nearby communities, WKEW can also be heard on an FM translator at 96.3 MHz, for listeners who prefer FM radio. It is also simulcast on sister station 1340 kHz WPOL in Winston-Salem, North Carolina.

It runs the Erica Campbell nationally syndicated morning show as well as other syndicated and local gospel and religious shows aimed at the African-American community.

== History ==
WGBG ("We're Going to Beat Germany") signed on 10 months before the attack on Pearl Harbor in 1941, playing such artists as Glenn Miller and Artie Shaw.

John Cirt Gill, Jr., known as "Jam-A-Ditty", became the state's first African American disc jockey in 1949.

Disc jockey Rick Dees began his career at WGBG, which was called "Top Gun Radio". Another student at Grimsley High School dared him to audition, and he succeeded.

Dusty Dunn began his 44-year career at WGBG "when The Beatles were the next big thing." In the early 1980s, he returned to the station (which was WKEW by that time) to do a four-hour morning talk show. Open Line, Greensboro's first talk show hosted by Ken Karns moved to WKEW in November 1986 when WBIG 1470 signed off.

In 1980, Bill Mitchell bought WGBG and changed its callsign to WKEW. The station also became the first full-time news/talk station in Greensboro. During the 1990s WKEW was the home station to the Greensboro/Carolina Monarchs hockey team and an Anaheim Mighty Ducks radio network affiliate. WKEW broadcast many Ducks games late at night.

On September 3, 1998, WKEW changed to Radio Disney, a radio format designed for children.

Truth Broadcasting bought WKEW in 2000. In November 2000, Radio Disney moved to 1320 WCOG and WKEW began simulcasting the same programming as WPOL in Winston-Salem.

== Translators ==
In addition to the AM signal, WKEW is relayed by an FM translator.

Call sign	Frequency	City of license	FID	ERP (W)	Class	FCC info
W242CD	96.3 FM	Greensboro, North Carolina	142274	250	D	LMS
