= WPOL =

- Winston-Salem, North Carolina; United States
- Broadcast area: Piedmont Triad
- Frequency: 1340 kHz
- Branding: The Light

Programming
- Format: Gospel

Ownership
- Owner: Truth Broadcasting Corporation
- Sister stations: WKEW, WFMO

History
- First air date: March 25, 1937
- Former call signs: WAIR; WMQX (1987–1995)

Technical information
- Licensing authority: FCC
- Facility ID: 72970
- Class: C
- Power: 1,000 watts unlimited
- Transmitter coordinates: 36°4′26.00″N 80°15′19.00″W
- Translator: See § Translators
- Repeater: 1400 WKEW (Greensboro)

Links
- Public license information: Public file; LMS
- Webcast: Listen Live
- Website: lightthetriad.com

WPOL (1340 AM) is a commercial radio station broadcasting a Gospel music radio format. Licensed to Winston-Salem, North Carolina, the station is owned by Truth Broadcasting Corporation. In Winston-Salem and nearby communities, WPOL can also be heard on an FM translator at 103.5 MHz, for listeners who prefer FM radio. It is also simulcast on sister station 1400 kHz WKEW in Greensboro, North Carolina. WPOL competes its triad coverage in High Point, North Carolina on 102.5 MHz.

WPOL runs the Get Up! Mornings with Erica Campbell nationally syndicated morning show as well as other syndicated and local gospel and religious shows aimed at the African-American community.

== History ==
WAIR first signed on the air on March 25, 1937 on 1250 kHz with 250 watts during the day The tower was on North Cherry Street. Later the signal was increased to 1,000 watts during the day.

In the 1970s, WAIR aired an Urban contemporary format. In March 1985, WAIR was a simulcast of Top 40 WSEZ on 93.1 FM (now WPAW) one-third of the time, though a billboard on Interstate 40 suggested WSEZ was broadcasting both on 1340 and 93.1. Later it was three-fourths urban and one-fourth a simulcast of album rock on WSEZ.

The WKEW simulcast began at the end of 2000.

== Translators ==
In addition to the main station, WPOL is relayed by an FM translator to widen its broadcast area in the triad.

Call sign	Frequency	City of license	FID	ERP (W)	Class	FCC info
W273DH	102.5 FM	High Point, North Carolina	201317	40	D	LMS
W278BM	103.5 FM	Winston-Salem, North Carolina	139568	250	D	LMS
