= Element 14 (disambiguation) =

Element 14 is silicon, the 14th element in the periodic table of elements.

Element 14 may also refer to:

- Element 14 (company), a former developer of DSL equipment created from the restructuring of Acorn Computers
- Farnell element14, a brand and subsidiary of electronic parts distributor Premier Farnell
- Newark element14, a high-service distributor of technology products
