= First Horizon Coliseum =

Multi-purpose arena in Greensboro, NC

- The Coliseum in 2024
- Interactive map of First Horizon Coliseum
- Former names: Greensboro Memorial Coliseum (1959–1980); Greensboro Coliseum (1980–2024)
- Address: 1921 W Gate City Blvd, Greensboro, North Carolina
- Coordinates: 36°03′35″N 79°49′33″W
- Owner: City of Greensboro
- Operator: Oak View Group
- Capacity: 22,000
- Record attendance: 23,642

Construction
- Groundbreaking: January 6, 1959
- Opened: October 29, 1959
- Expanded: 1972, 1978, 1993
- Years active: 1959-present
- Cost: $4.5 million (equivalent to $49.7 million in 2025)

Tenants
- Greensboro Generals (EHL/SHL) (1959–1975); Wake Forest Demon Deacons (NCAA) (1959–1989); Carolina Cougars (ABA) (1969–1974); Greensboro Monarchs (ECHL) (1989–1995); Greensboro City Gators (GBA) (1991–1992); Carolina Monarchs (AHL) (1995–1997); Carolina Hurricanes (NHL) (1997–1999); Greensboro Generals (ECHL) (1999–2004); Greensboro Prowlers (AF2) (2000–2003); Greensboro Revolution (NIFL) (2006–2007); UNC Greensboro Spartans (NCAA) (2010–present); Carolina Cobras (NAL) (2018–2025); Carolina Cowboys (PBR) (2023–present); Greensboro Gargoyles (ECHL) (2025–present)

First Horizon Coliseum (formerly Greensboro Coliseum) is an arena in Greensboro, North Carolina. Opened in 1959 as the first building of the Greensboro Complex, the 22,000-seat arena is the home arena of the UNC Greensboro Spartans basketball team and the Greensboro Gargoyles of the ECHL.

It has a history in hosting college basketball games, having been a recurring host of the Atlantic Coast Conference (ACC) basketball tournaments, and early-round games in the NCAA tournament. As it was the largest arena in the state for a period, the Coliseum previously hosted a number of neutral site games involving North Carolina's teams; Wake Forest regularly played marquee and ACC games at the Coliseum from 1959 to 1989.

== History ==
The arena was first proposed in 1944 by Greensboro mayor W.H. Sullivan to honor the soldiers who fought in World War I and World War II. The building was approved and venue construction commenced in 1958 and was finalized by September 1959 and opened one month later. Initially named the "Greensboro Memorial Coliseum" (a title it retained until 1980), the arena welcomed its first event on October 29, 1959. At its inception, the Coliseum had a seating capacity of 7,100, making it one of the largest arenas on the East Coast. In 1993 the arena was expanded to reach a capacity of 22,000, where the arena stands today.

In October 2024, the arena announced a ten-year naming rights agreement with First Horizon Bank, under which it was renamed First Horizon Coliseum.

== Events ==
Over the years, the Coliseum has been the site of numerous sporting events, particularly basketball. Additionally, it has hosted concerts for over four decades. During the 1960s and 1970s, the venue attracted rock and R&B artists, with The Monkees being the first major act to perform there. Elvis Presley held a concert on April 14, 1972, and footage from this event was featured in his last film, titled Elvis on Tour. Presley returned to the Coliseum for another concert on April 21, 1977, shortly before his death on August 16. On April 24, 2010, Christian band Casting Crowns recorded their live album, Until the Whole World Hears... Live, at the Coliseum. The rock band Phish set the attendance record for a concert at the venue on March 1, 2003, with 23,642 fans present.

The Coliseum also hosted 102 JAMZ SuperJam from 1997 to 2014, featuring well-known artists from the hip hop scene, including LL Cool J, Soulja Boy, Ludacris, Ja Rule, Piles, Nas, Lil Jon & the East Side Boyz, Travis Porter, and the Ying Yang Twins.

Additionally, the Coliseum was the venue for American Idol auditions for season 5 on October 3, 2005. From July 8 to 10, 2012, it served as the Greensboro audition site for the second season of The X Factor.

List of concerts and events held at the coliseum
Artist	Event	Date	Opening act(s)
3 Doors Down	3 Doors Down Tour	December 17, 2008	Switchfoot & American Bang
AC/DC	Highway to Hell Tour	October 3, 1979	Blackfoot & Mother's Finest
AC/DC	Back in Black Tour	August 10, 1980	Nantucket
AC/DC	Fly on the Wall Tour	November 17, 1985	Yngwie Malmsteen
AC/DC	Blow Up Your Video World Tour	August 27, 1988	White Lion
AC/DC	Razors Edge World Tour	February 17, 1991	King's X
AC/DC	Ballbreaker World Tour	January 12, 1996	The Poor
AC/DC	Stiff Upper Lip World Tour	March 29, 2001	Wide Mouth Mason
AC/DC	Black Ice World Tour	October 25, 2009	The Answer
AC/DC	Rock or Bust World Tour	August 27, 2016	Tyler Bryant & The Shakedown
Acquire the Fire	RESILIENT Tour	March 20, 2015	—N/a
Acquire the Fire	RESILIENT Tour	March 21, 2015	—N/a
Aerosmith	Toys in the Attic Tour	October 10, 1975	REO Speedwagon & Ted Nugent
Aerosmith	Aerosmith Express Tour	May 5, 1978	Mahogany Rush
Aerosmith	Right in the Nuts Tour	December 15, 1979	—N/a
Aerosmith	Permanent Vacation Tour	March 23, 1988	white lion
Aerosmith	Nine Lives Tour	January 31, 1998	Kenny Wayne Shepherd
Aerosmith	Nine Lives Tour	April 15, 1999	The Afghan Whigs
Aerosmith	Just Push Play Tour	November 25, 2001	Fuel
Aerosmith	Rockin' the Joint Tour	January 21, 2006	Lenny Kravitz
Aerosmith & Kiss	AeroKiss Tour	November 22, 2003	Saliva
Alabama	Feels So Right Tour	November 21, 1981	Janie Fricke
Alabama	The Closer You Get... Tour	February 12, 1983	—N/a
Alabama	40-Hour Week Tour	February 8, 1985	Bill Medley
Alabama	Roll On 2 North American Tour	November 11, 2023	Grits & Glamour, Lorrie Morgan, & Pam Tillis
Alan Jackson	Drive Tour	November 8, 2002	—N/a
Alan Jackson	Last Call: One More For the Road Tour	September 10, 2022	—N/a
Alice Cooper	Killer Tour	May 13, 1972	Todd Rundgren & Free
Alice Cooper	Billion Dollar Babies Holiday Tour	December 9, 1973	ZZ Top
Alice Cooper	School's Out For Summer Tour	June 30, 1978	Sweet
Alice Cooper	Raise Your Fist and Yell Tour	January 29, 1988	Motörhead
Alicia Keys	As I Am Tour	May 30, 2008	Jordin Sparks
Alicia Keys	Set the World on Fire Tour	March 30, 2013	Miguel
The Allman Brothers Band	Brothers and Sisters Tour	May 24, 1974	—N/a
The Allman Brothers Band	Reach for the Sky Tour	August 16, 1980	Nantucket
American Idol LIVE!	American Idols LIVE! Tour 2005	July 17, 2005	—N/a
American Idol LIVE!	American Idols LIVE! Tour 2006	July 30, 2006	—N/a
American Idol LIVE!	American Idols LIVE! Tour 2007	September 11, 2007	—N/a
American Idol LIVE!	American Idols LIVE! Tour 2009	August 2, 2009	—N/a
Amy Grant	A Christmas to Remember Tour	December 4, 1999	Michael W. Smith, Point of Grace, & The Katinas
Ana Gabriel	Un Deseo Más Tour	November 17, 2024	—N/a
Andrea Bocelli	30th Anniversary Tour	October 12, 2025	—N/a
Ashford & Simpson	1982 Tour	August 20, 1982	—N/a
Avenged Sevenfold & Buckcherry	Avenged Sevenfold Tour	November 29, 2008	Shinedown & Saving Abel
The Avett Brothers	The Carpenter Tour	December 31, 2012	Amos Lee
The Avett Brothers	—N/a	December 31, 2019	Drew Holcomb and the Neighbors
The Avett Brothers	An Evening with the Avett Brothers	March 19, 2022	David Childers
Bachman–Turner Overdrive	Four Wheel Drive Tour	July 12, 1975	Bob Seger
Backstreet Boys	Into the Millennium Tour	February 20, 2000	—N/a
Backstreet Boys	Black & Blue Tour	June 17, 2001	Shaggy & Krystal Harris
Bad Company	Straight Shooter Tour	May 14, 1975	—N/a
Bad Company	Run with the Pack Tour	April 3, 1976	Kansas
The Band CAMINO	The Tour Camino	September 18, 2021	—N/a
The Bar-Kays	Nightcruising Tour	March 12, 1982	—N/a
Barry Manilow	If I Should Love Again Tour	October 31, 1981	—N/a
Barry Manilow	Singin' with the Big Bands Tour	April 27, 1994	—N/a
Barry Manilow	The Last Concert	August 10, 2026	John Heffron
The Beach Boys	The Beach Boys' Christmas Album Tour	January 1, 1965	—N/a
The Beach Boys	Summer Days (And Summer Nights!!) Tour	July 13, 1965	The Roemans
The Beach Boys	Wild Honey Tour	April 23, 1968	Buffalo Springfield & Strawberry Alarm Clock
The Beach Boys	Friends Tour	October 20, 1968	1910 Fruitgum Company & The Pickle Brothers
The Beach Boys	1975 Tour	April 5, 1975	Billy Joel
The Beach Boys	L.A. (Light Album) Tour	April 29, 1979	Ian Matthews
The Beach Boys	1982 Tour	June 2, 1982	Alliance
The Beach Boys	Still Cruisin' Tour	July 30, 1989	Chicago
Bee Gees	Spirits Having Flown Tour	October 2, 1979	Sweet Inspirations
Beyoncé, Alicia Keys & Missy Elliott	Verizon Ladies First Tour	March 21, 2004	Tamia
Beyoncé	I Am... World Tour	June 27, 2009	RichGirl
Bill Clinton	Embracing Our Common Humanity	November 30, 2010	—N/a
Billy Currington	Summer Forever Tour	February 26, 2016	Kelsea Ballerini
Billy Ray Cyrus	Shot Full of Love Tour	September 19, 1999	—N/a
Billy Joel	Turnstiles Tour	March 23, 1977	—N/a
Billy Joel	52nd Street Tour	December 3, 1978	—N/a
Billy Strings	Winter Tour 2022	February 11, 2022	—N/a
Billy Strings	Fall Tour 2023	December 6, 2023	—N/a
Billy Squier	Emotions in Motion Tour	January 21, 1983	Def Leppard
Billy Squier	Signs of Life Tour	November 1, 1984	Ratt
Black Sabbath	Master of Reality Tour	April 1, 1972	—N/a
Black Sabbath	Sabbath Bloody Sabbath Tour	February 24, 1974	Bedlam
Black Sabbath	Sabotage Tour	December 7, 1975	Savoy Brown & Grey Ghost
Black Sabbath	Mob Rules Tour	February 16, 1982	Doc Holliday
Blackfoot	Marauder Tour	September 26, 1981	Outlaws
Blake Shelton	Back to the Honkey Tonk Tour	February 23, 2023	Carly Pearce & Jackson Dean
Blake Shelton	Friends & Heroes Tour	March 1, 2025	Craig Morgan, Deanna Carter, & Trace Adkins
Blue Öyster Cult	Agents of Fortune Tour	December 28, 1976	Grinderswitch
Bob Dylan	1978 World Tour	December 7, 1978	—N/a
Bob Seger & The Silver Bullet Band	Night Moves Tour	April 1, 1977	—N/a
Bob Seger & The Silver Bullet Band	Against the Wind Tour	March 23, 1980	—N/a
Bob Seger & The Silver Bullet Band	The Distance Tour	March 11, 1983	John Hall Band
Bob Seger & The Silver Bullet Band	2011 Tour	April 23, 2011	Frankie Ballard
Bon Jovi	Slippery When Wet Tour	May 9, 1987	Cinderella
Bon Jovi	Lost Highway Tour	March 16, 2008	Daughtry
Boston	Boston Tour	May 14, 1977	Starcastle
Brad Paisley	Bonfires & Amplifiers Tour	November 9, 2007	Rodney Adkins & Taylor Swift
Brandon Lake	Tear Off the Roof Tour	May 4, 2024	DOE
Brandon Lake	King of Hearts Tour	October 17, 2025	Pat Barrett & Franni Cash
Brandy & Monica	The Boy Is Mine Tour	November 1, 2025	Muni Long, Kelly Rowland, Jamal Roberts
Brantley Gilbert	Let It Ride Tour	April 10, 2014	Thomas Rhett & Eric Paslay
Brantley Gilbert	The Devil Don't Sleep Tour	February 24, 2017	Luke Combs, Tucker Beathard, & Brian Davis
Bread	Lost Without Your Love Tour	August 26, 1977	—N/a
Britney Spears	(You Drive Me) Crazy Tour	March 29, 2000	LFO & Bosson
Britney Spears	The Circus Starring Britney Spears	September 5, 2009	Jordin Sparks & Kristinia DeBarge
Brooks & Dunn	Reboot 2023 Tour	June 17, 2023	Scotty McCreery & Megan Moroney
Bruce Springsteen	Devils & Dust Tour	July 26, 2005	—N/a
Bruce Springsteen & The E Street Band	The River Tour	February 28, 1981	—N/a
Bruce Springsteen & The E Street Band	Born in the U.S.A. Tour	January 18, 1985	—N/a
Bruce Springsteen & The E Street Band	Born in the U.S.A. Tour	January 19, 1985	—N/a
Bruce Springsteen & The E Street Band	The Rising Tour	November 16, 2002	—N/a
Bruce Springsteen & The E Street Band	Magic Tour	April 28, 2008	—N/a
Bruce Springsteen & The E Street Band	Working on a Dream Tour	May 2, 2009	—N/a
Bruce Springsteen & The E Street Band	Wrecking Ball World Tour	March 19, 2012	—N/a
Bruce Springsteen & The E Street Band	2023 Tour	March 25, 2023	—N/a
Bryan Adams	Reckless Tour	September 10, 1985	—N/a
Bryan Adams	Into the Fire Tour	May 29, 1987	—N/a
Budweiser Superfest	—	August 21, 2010	—N/a
Carrie Underwood	Play On Tour	October 29, 2010	Billy Currington & Sons of Sylvia
Carrie Underwood	Blown Away Tour	November 4, 2012	Hunter Hayes
Carrie Underwood	Storyteller Tour: Stories in the Round	February 3, 2016	The Swon Brothers & Easton Corbin
Carrie Underwood	Cry Pretty Tour 360	May 1, 2019	Maddie & Tae & Runaway June
Casting Crowns	The Altar and the Door Tour	November 17, 2007	Leeland & John Waller
Casting Crowns	Peace on Earth Tour	December 12, 2008	Natalie Grant & Denver and the Mile High Orchestra
Casting Crowns	Until the Whole World Hears Tour	April 24, 2010	Tenth Avenue North & CALEB
Casting Crowns	Come to the Well Tour	October 22, 2011	Sanctus Real, The Afters & Lindsay McCaul
Casting Crowns	Story Tour	November 24, 2012	Natalie Grant & Jeremy Camp
Casting Crowns	THRIVE Tour	November 8, 2014	Mandisa & Sidewalk Prophets
Chance the Rapper	Be Encouraged Tour	June 7, 2017	King Louie & DJ Oreo
Charlie Wilson	In It to Win It Tour	March 3, 2017	—N/a
Cheap Trick	In Color Tour	December 18, 1977	AC/DC
Cheap Trick	One on One Tour	August 22, 1982	—N/a
The Cheetah Girls	One World Tour	November 22, 2008	Clique Girlz
Cher	Living Proof: The Farewell Tour	September 7, 2002	Cyndi Lauper
The Chicks	Top of the World Tour	May 17, 2003	Joan Osborne
The Chicks	The Chicks World Tour 2023	August 8, 2023	Wild Rivers
Chris Brown & Bow Wow	UCP Exclusive Tour	December 23, 2007	Sean Kingston, Soulja Boy, Shop Boyz, Lil Mama
Chris Brown	Between The Sheets Tour	March 18, 2015	Tyga
Chris Stapleton	Chris Stapleton's All-American Road Show Tour	October 19, 2019	Brothers Osborne & Kendell Marvel
Chris Stapleton	Chris Stapleton's All-American Road Show Tour	June 18, 2025	Maggie Rose
Chris Tomlin & Hillsong United	Tomlin United Tour	June 8, 2022	Pat Barrett & Benjamin Hastings
Christian Nodal	Foraji2 Tour	November 2, 2024	—N/a
Cirque du Soleil	Delirium	May 6, 2006	—N/a
Cirque du Soleil	Delirium	May 7, 2006	—N/a
Cirque du Soleil	Saltimbanco	September 19, 2007	—N/a
Cirque du Soleil	Saltimbanco	September 20, 2007	—N/a
Cirque du Soleil	Saltimbanco	September 21, 2007	—N/a
Cirque du Soleil	Saltimbanco	September 22, 2007	—N/a
Cirque du Soleil	Saltimbanco	September 23, 2007	—N/a
Cirque du Soleil	Alegría	April 13, 2011	—N/a
Cirque du Soleil	Alegría	April 14, 2011	—N/a
Cirque du Soleil	Alegría	April 15, 2011	—N/a
Cirque du Soleil	Alegría	April 16, 2011	—N/a
Cirque du Soleil	Alegría	April 17, 2011	—N/a
Cirque du Soleil	Quidam	April 17, 2013	—N/a
Cirque du Soleil	Quidam	April 18, 2013	—N/a
Cirque du Soleil	Quidam	April 19, 2013	—N/a
Cirque du Soleil	Quidam	April 20, 2013	—N/a
Cirque du Soleil	Quidam	April 21, 2013	—N/a
Cirque du Soleil	Michael Jackson: The Immortal	April 11, 2014	—N/a
Cirque du Soleil	Michael Jackson: The Immortal	April 12, 2014	—N/a
Cirque du Soleil	Ovo	April 20, 2016	—N/a
Cirque du Soleil	Ovo	April 21, 2016	—N/a
Cirque du Soleil	Ovo	April 22, 2016	—N/a
Cirque du Soleil	Ovo	April 23, 2016	—N/a
Cirque du Soleil	Ovo	April 24, 2016	—N/a
Commodores	Natural High Tour	September 16, 1978	—N/a
Commodores	In the Pocket Tour	September 19, 1981	—N/a
Conway Twitty	Southern Comfort Tour	May 1, 1982	Ronnie McDowell
Country Shindig	—	January 25, 1970	—N/a
Country Shindig	—	July 4, 1975	—N/a
Country Shindig	—	January 25, 1976	—N/a
Country Shindig	—	January 15, 1977	—N/a
Creed	Human Clay Tour	May 3, 2000	Sevendust & Guano Apes
Crosby, Stills & Nash	CSN Tour	November 12, 1977	—N/a
Crosby, Stills & Nash	Daylight Again Tour	October 21, 1982	—N/a
Crosby, Stills, Nash & Young	CSNY Tour of America	April 16, 2002	—N/a
The Cult	Sonic Temple Tour	February 20, 1990	Bonham
The Cult	Ceremony Tour	February 12, 1992	Lenny kravitz
Dan Fogelberg	The Innocent Age Tour	January 31, 1982	—N/a
Daughtry	Leave This Town Tour	November 12, 2009	Theory of a Deadman & Cavo
Daughtry	Break the Spell Tour	April 7, 2012	SafetySuit & Mike Sanchez
Daughtry	Baptized World Tour	November 7, 2014	Drew Bordeaux
The Dave Clark Five	1965 North American Tour	July 22, 1965	—N/a
The Dave Clark Five	1965 North American Tour	December 7, 1965	—N/a
The Dave Clark Five	1966 North American Tour	July 20, 1966	—N/a
Dave Matthews Band	Before These Crowded Streets Tour	November 28, 1998	Béla Fleck and the Flecktones
David Bowie	Diamond Dogs Tour	July 6, 1974	—N/a
David Cassidy	1972 Tour	April 29, 1972	—N/a
David Lee Roth	Skyscraper Tour	January 28, 1989	Poison & Tesla
DC Talk	Supernatural Tour	March 11, 1999	The W's & Jennifer Knapp
The Dead	2009 Tour	April 12, 2009	—N/a
Dead & Company	2015 Tour	November 14, 2015	—N/a
Deep Purple	Stormbringer Tour	December 13, 1974	Electric Light Orchestra & Elf
Deep Purple	Come Taste the Band Tour	January 30, 1976	Ted Nugent & Nazareth
Def Leppard	Hysteria World Tour	December 19, 1987	Tesla
Def Leppard	Songs from the Sparkle Lounge Tour	March 27, 2008	Styx & REO Speedwagon
Demi Lovato	Demi Lovato: Live in Concert	July 29, 2009	David Archuleta, Jordan Pruitt & KSM
Dio	Dream Evil Tour	January 21, 1988	Megadeth & Savatage
Dire Straits	Communiqué Tour	September 18, 1979	—N/a
Dolly Parton	Pure and Simple Tour	June 3, 2016	—N/a
Donny & Marie Osmond	Donny & Marie Christmas Tour	December 9, 2013	—N/a
The Doobie Brothers	1974 Tour	April 27, 1974	—N/a
The Doobie Brothers	1975 Tour	October 26, 1975	—N/a
The Doobie Brothers	1978 Tour	October 7, 1978	—N/a
The Doobie Brothers	Minute by Minute Tour	September 22, 1979	—N/a
The Doobie Brothers	One Step Closer Tour	October 31, 1980	—N/a
Dr. Hook	Pleasure & Pain Tour	January 30, 1979	Sha Na Na
Drake	Light, Dreams & Nightmares Tour	October 9, 2010	Rick Ross & J. Cole
Drake & Future	Summer Sixteen Tour	August 23, 2016	Roy Wood$ & Dvsn
Duran Duran	Sing Blue Silver Tour	March 30, 1984	—N/a
Eagles	One of These Nights Tour	August 1, 1975	Seals and Crofts
Eagles	Hotel California Tour	June 27, 1977	—N/a
Eagles	The Long Run Tour	January 29, 1980	—N/a
Eagles	Hell Freezes Over Reunion Tour	June 17, 1996	—N/a
Eagles	Farewell 1 Tour	May 23, 2003	—N/a
Eagles	Long Road Out of Eden Tour	January 17, 2009	—N/a
Eagles	History of the Eagles Tour	November 16, 2013	JD & The Straight Shot
Eagles	An Evening with the Eagles	October 17, 2017	—N/a
Eagles	Hotel California Tour	April 4, 2023	—N/a
Earth, Wind & Fire	All 'n All Tour	January 6, 1978	—N/a
Earth, Wind & Fire	I Am Tour	September 21, 1979	—N/a
Earth, Wind & Fire	Raise! Tour	October 27, 1981	—N/a
Edgar Winter Group	They Only Come Out at Night Tour	August 10, 1973	Foghat
Electric Light Orchestra	On the Third Day Tour	October 27, 1973	REO Speedwagon & Foghat
Electric Light Orchestra	Face the Music Tour	March 27, 1976	Journey
Electric Light Orchestra	Out of the Blue Tour	July 11, 1978	—N/a
Electric Light Orchestra	Time Tour	October 17, 1981	Hall & Oates
Elton John	1974 North American Tour	November 8, 1974	Kiki Dee
Elton John	Louder Than Concorde Tour	July 13, 1976	—N/a
Elton John	Farewell Yellow Brick Road	April 19, 2022	—N/a
Elton John & Billy Joel	Face to Face 2001	April 28, 2001	—N/a
Elvis Presley	1972 North American Tour	April 14, 1972	—N/a
Elvis Presley	1974 North American Tour	March 13, 1974	—N/a
Elvis Presley	1975 North American Tour	July 21, 1975	—N/a
Elvis Presley	1976 North American Tour	June 30, 1976	—N/a
Elvis Presley	1977 North American Tour	April 21, 1977	—N/a
Emerson, Lake & Palmer	Works Volume 1 Tour	June 29, 1977	—N/a
Eminem	Anger Management Tour	December 13, 2000	—N/a
Eric Church	Blood, Sweat & Beers Tour	February 18, 2012	Brantley Gilbert & Sonia Leigh
Eric Church	The Outsiders Tour	September 27, 2014	Dwight Yoakam & Brothers Osborne
Eric Church	Holdin' My Own Tour	May 20, 2017	—N/a
Eric Church	Gather Again Tour	December 18, 2021	—N/a
Eric Church	Free the Machine Tour	March 6, 2026	49 Winchester
Eric Clapton	461 Ocean Boulevard Tour	August 2, 1974	Ross
Eric Clapton	There's One in Every Crowd Tour	August 29, 1975	Poco
Eric Clapton	Another Ticket Tour	May 24, 1981	—N/a
Eric Clapton	Journeyman Tour	August 2, 1990	—N/a
Feid	Ferxxocalipsis World Tour	June 21, 2024	—N/a
Five Finger Death Punch	North American Tour 2019	November 22, 2019	Three Days Grace, Bad Wolves, & Fire from the Gods
Fleetwood Mac	Rumours Tour	March 19, 1977	Firefall
Fleetwood Mac	Mirage Tour	September 1, 1982	—N/a
Fleetwood Mac	Say You Will Tour	September 10, 2003	—N/a
Fleetwood Mac	On with the Show	March 17, 2015	—N/a
Florida Georgia Line	Here's to the Good Times Tour	November 23, 2013	Colt Ford & Tyler Farr
Florida Georgia Line	Smooth Tour	March 23, 2017	Dustin Lynch, Chris Lane & Seth Ennis
Foghat	Fool for the City Tour	May 30, 1975	Blue Öyster Cult & Thee Image
Foghat	Fool for the City Tour	November 7, 1975	—N/a
Foghat	Night Shift Tour	April 10, 1976	Montrose
Foghat	Stone Blue Tour	May 19, 1978	—N/a
Foghat	Tight Shoes Tour	October 3, 1980	—N/a
Foo Fighters	Concrete and Gold Tour	October 15, 2017	The Struts
Foreigner	Head Games Tour	October 19, 1979	—N/a
Foreigner	4 Tour	March 28, 1982	Bob Welch
For King and Country	A Drummer Boy Christmas	December 11, 2022	—N/a
Fresh Music Festival	—	May 27, 2012	—N/a
Further Festival	—	September 21, 2000	—N/a
Gaither Homecoming	2001 Tour	April 20, 2001	—N/a
Gaither Homecoming	2008 Tour	July 19, 2008	—N/a
Gaither Homecoming	2009 Tour	April 25, 2009	—N/a
The Gap Band	The Gap Band Tour	August 4, 1979	Mass Production, McFadden & Whitehead; Anita Ward & Five Special
The Gap Band	Gap Band IV Tour	September 24, 1982	—N/a
Garth Brooks	The Garth Brooks World Tour with Trisha Yearwood	November 19, 2014	Trisha Yearwood
Garth Brooks	The Garth Brooks World Tour with Trisha Yearwood	November 20, 2014	Trisha Yearwood
Garth Brooks	The Garth Brooks World Tour with Trisha Yearwood	November 21, 2014	Trisha Yearwood
Garth Brooks	The Garth Brooks World Tour with Trisha Yearwood	November 22, 2014	Trisha Yearwood
Garth Brooks	The Garth Brooks World Tour with Trisha Yearwood	November 23, 2014	Trisha Yearwood
George Strait	Honkytonkville Tour	February 22, 2004	Dierks Bentley & Kellie Coffey
George Strait	It Just Comes Natural Tour	January 20, 2007	Ronnie Milsap & Taylor Swift
George Strait	The Cowboy Rides Away Tour	March 23, 2013	Martina McBride
George Strait & Reba McEntire	Twang Tour	January 23, 2010	Lee Ann Womack
Genesis	Mama Tour	December 11, 1983	—N/a
Genesis	Invisible Touch Tour	February 23, 1987	—N/a
Gladys Knight, Patti LaBelle, Chaka Khan, Stephanie Mills	The Queens: 4 Legends, 1 Stage	September 19, 2025	—N/a
Gloria Estefan	Live & Re-Wrapped Tour	September 7, 2004	—N/a
Gloria Trevi & Alejandra Guzmán	Versus World Tour	October 1, 2017	—N/a
Golden Earring	Moontan Tour	June 7, 1974	—N/a
Gordon Lightfoot	Salute Tour	March 1, 1984	—N/a
Grand Funk Railroad	Shinin' On Tour	April 6, 1974	—N/a
Grateful Dead	Go to Heaven Tour	May 1, 1980	—N/a
Grateful Dead	1981 Tour	April 30, 1981	—N/a
Grateful Dead	1981 Tour	April 31, 1981	—N/a
Grateful Dead	1983 Tour	October 9, 1983	—N/a
Grateful Dead	Built to Last Tour	March 30, 1989	—N/a
Grateful Dead	Built to Last Tour	March 31, 1989	—N/a
Grateful Dead	1991 Tour	March 31, 1991	—N/a
Grateful Dead	1991 Tour	April 1, 1991	—N/a
Greensboro Blues Festival	—	March 15, 2008	—N/a
Greensboro Blues Festival	—	February 20, 2009	—N/a
Greensboro Blues Festival	—	April 2, 2010	—N/a
Greensboro Blues Festival	—	February 13, 2011	—N/a
Guns N' Roses	Use Your Illusion Tour	June 25, 1991	Skid Row
Guns N' Roses	Chinese Democracy Tour	November 2, 2006	Papa Roach & Sebastian Bach
Hank Williams Jr.	Strong Stuff Tour	April 15, 1983	—N/a
Hank Williams Jr.	Major Moves Tour	May 11, 1984	—N/a
Hank Williams Jr.	Rowdy Frynds Tour	May 9, 2008	Lynyrd Skynyrd
Hawk Nelson	Revolve Tour	January 23, 2009	Natalie Grant & Krystal Meyers
Hawk Nelson	Revolve Tour	January 24, 2009	Natalie Grant & Krystal Meyers
Heart	Dog & Butterfly Tour	February 3, 1979	Firefall
Heart	Bebe le Strange Tour	May 14, 1980	—N/a
Heart	Private Audition Tour	November 5, 1982	—N/a
High School Musical	High School Musical: The Concert	December 27, 2006	Jordan Pruitt
Hillsong United	Aftermath Tour	August 19, 2011	—N/a
Hillsong United	Zion Tour	November 18, 2013	—N/a
Huey Lewis and the News	Fore! Tour	February 15, 1987	Robert Cray Band
Humble Pie	Smokin' Tour	July 10, 1972	Eagles
Humble Pie	Eat It Tour	July 7, 1973	—N/a
In This Moment & Ice Nine Kills	Kiss of Death Tour	November 21, 2023	Avatar & New Years Day
Iron Maiden	World Slavery Tour	February 9, 1985	Twisted Sister
Iron Maiden	Somewhere on Tour	April 5, 1987	Waysted
Iron Maiden	Legacy of the Beast World Tour	October 25, 2022	Within Temptation
J. Cole & 21 Savage	The Off-Season Tour	September 28, 2022	Druski & Morray
The Jackson 5	The Jackson 5 First National Tour	December 29, 1970	—N/a
The Jackson 5	The Jackson 5 World Tour	July 8, 1973	—N/a
Jackson Browne	Lawyers in Love Tour	August 6, 1983	—N/a
Jackson Browne	The Naked Ride Home Tour	May 21, 2002	—N/a
The Jacksons	Triumph Tour	July 24, 1981	—N/a
Jamie Foxx	Unpredictable Tour	March 17, 2007	Fantasia Barrino
Jamie Foxx	Blame It Tour	July 19, 2009	Collie Buddz
James Taylor	Before This World Tour	July 31, 2015	—N/a
James Taylor	Fall 2021 Tour	November 19, 2021	Jackson Browne
Janet Jackson	Rhythm Nation 1814 World Tour	August 14, 1990	Chuckii Booker
Janet Jackson	All for You Tour	September 9, 2001	—N/a
Jason Aldean	Wide Open Tour	May 29, 2009	Colt Ford
Jason Aldean	My Kinda Party Tour	February 4, 2011	Eric Church & The JaneDear Girls
Jason Aldean	Night Train Tour	May 18, 2013	Jake Owen & Thomas Rhett
Jason Aldean	Burn It Down Tour	February 13, 2015	Tyler Farr & Cole Swindell
Jay Z	BP3 Tour	February 28, 2010	Jeezy & Trey Songz
Jay Z	Magna Carter World Tour	January 5, 2014	—N/a
Jay Z & R. Kelly	Best of Both Worlds Tour	October 9, 2004	—N/a
Jay Z & Mary J. Blige	Heart of the City Tour	April 5, 2008	The-Dream
Jay Z & Kanye West	Watch the Throne Tour	October 30, 2011	—N/a
Jelly Roll	Backroad Baptism Tour	October 6, 2023	Yelawolf, Struggle Jennings, & Josh Adam Meyers
Jerry Lee Lewis	1969 Tour	June 28, 1969	—N/a
Jerry Lee Lewis	1971 Tour	May 22, 1971	—N/a
Jerry Lee Lewis	1971 Tour	November 27, 1971	—N/a
Jerry Lee Lewis	1973 Tour	January 28, 1973	—N/a
Jerry Lee Lewis	1975 Tour	March 9, 1975	—N/a
Jerry Lee Lewis	1977 Tour	January 15, 1977	—N/a
Jerry Lee Lewis	1981 Tour	March 6, 1981	—N/a
Jethro Tull	Aqualung Tour	November 8, 1971	—N/a
Jethro Tull	A Passion Play Tour	May 19, 1973	—N/a
Jethro Tull	Minstrel in the Gallery Tour	August 9, 1975	—N/a
Jethro Tull	Songs from the Wood Tour	November 23, 1977	—N/a
The Jimi Hendrix Experience	—	July 12, 1967	The Monkees
Jimmy Buffett	Tuesdays, Thursdays, Saturdays Tour	February 17, 2001	—N/a
Jimmy Buffett	Far Side of the World Tour	April 20, 2002	—N/a
Joan Jett and the Blackhearts	Album Tour	November 11, 1983	—N/a
John Denver	Back Home Again Tour	October 11, 1974	—N/a
John Denver	I Want to Live Tour	March 26, 1978	—N/a
John Denver	Autograph Tour	May 16, 1980	—N/a
John Denver	Seasons of the Heart Tour	May 24, 1982	—N/a
John Mayer	Battle Studies World Tour	March 15, 2010	Michael Franti & Spearhead
Johnny Winter	Still Alive and Well Tour	January 7, 1974	—N/a
Journey	Raised on Radio Tour	November 13, 1986	Glass Tiger
Journey	Revelation Tour	September 18, 2009	Cheap Trick & Night Ranger
Journey	Eclipse Tour	October 3, 2012	Pat Benatar & Loverboy
Journey	Eclipse Tour	June 12, 2017	Asia
Journey	Freedom Tour	February 11, 2023	Toto
Journey	The Final Frontier Tour	May 21, 2026	—N/a
Judas Priest	World Vengeance Tour	January 16, 1983	—N/a
Judas Priest	Mercenaries of Metal Tour	September 8, 1988	—N/a
Justin Bieber	My World Tour	December 15, 2010	Sean Kingston & Mindless Behavior
Justin Bieber	Believe Tour	January 19, 2013	Carly Rae Jepsen & Cody Simpson
Justin Bieber	Purpose World Tour	July 6, 2016	Post Malone & Moxie Raia
Justin Bieber	Justice World Tour	April 5, 2022	Jaden, Eddie Benjamin,< ¿Téo?
Justin Moore	Off the Beaten Path Tour	January 23, 2014	Randy Houser & Josh Thompson
Kamala Harris	–	September 12, 2024	—N/a
Kansas	Leftoverture Tour	February 17, 1977	Styx
Kansas	Point of Know Return Tour	November 6, 1977	Crawler
Kansas	2 For the Show Tour	July 30, 1978	Walter Egan
Kansas	Monolith Tour	October 27, 1979	Sniff 'n' the Tears
Kenny Chesney	Greatest Hits Tour	November 17, 2000	—N/a
Kenny Chesney	Greatest Hits Tour	September 14, 2001	Lee Ann Womack
Kenny Chesney	Margarita's & Senorita's Tour	February 15, 2003	Montgomery Gentry & Kellie Coffey
Kenny Chesney	Guitars, Tiki-Bars & A Whole Lotta Love Tour	April 24, 2004	Keith Urban
Kenny Chesney	Flip-Flop Summer Tour	April 19, 2007	Pat Green & Sugarland
Kenny Chesney	The Big Revival Tour	April 16, 2015	Jake Owen & Chase Rice
Kenny Chesney	I Go Back Tour	April 28, 2023	Kelsea Ballerini
Kenny Rogers	Love Will Turn You Around Tour	March 27, 1982	Larry Gatlin & The Gatlin Brothers Band
Kenny Rogers	We've Got Tonight Tour	March 20, 1983	Crystal Gayle
Kenny Rogers	The Heart of the Matter Tour	March 9, 1985	Dottie West & Sawyer Brown
Kevin Hart	What Now? Tour	April 21, 2015	—N/a
Kevin Hart	Reality Check Tour	May 17, 2023	—N/a
Keyshia Cole	The Love Hard Tour	February 23, 2024	Trey Songz, K. Michelle, & Jaheim
Keyshia Cole	The Way It Is 20th Anniversary Tour	July 16, 2025	T-Pain, Tink, Amerie, & Elijah Blake
Kid Rock	Born Free Part 1 Tour	February 22, 2011	Jamey Johnson & Ty Stone
Kid Rock	Rebel Soul Tour	February 26, 2013	Buckcherry & Hellbound Glory
KISS	Alive! Tour	September 12, 1975	Slade
KISS	Destroyer Tour	August 27, 1976	Ted Nugent, Bob Seger & Cheap Trick
KISS	Alive II Tour	December 31, 1977	Piper
KISS	Dynasty Tour	July 3, 1979	Nantucket
KISS	Asylum Tour	December 29, 1985	Black 'n Blue
KISS	Crazy Nights Tour	February 5, 1988	Ted Nugent
KISS	Hot in the Shade Tour	July 27, 1990	Slaughter
KISS	Alive/Worldwide Tour	September 28, 1996	The Verve Pipe
KISS	Kiss Farewell Tour	April 22, 2000	Ted Nugent & Skid Row
KISS	End of the Road World Tour	February 8, 2020	David Lee Roth
Koe Wetzel	Road to Hell Paso Tour	September 15, 2023	—N/a
KoЯn	Rock Is Dead Tour	March 29, 1999	Rob Zombie & Videodrone
KoЯn	Sick and Twisted Tour	April 15, 2000	Staind & Mindless Self Indulgence
KoЯn	Requiem Tour	March 11, 2022	Chevelle & Code Orange
Latto	Sugar Honey Iced Tea Tour	October 19, 2024	Mariah the Scientist & Karrahbooo
Lauren Daigle	The Kaleidoscope Tour	December 7, 2023	Victory Byrd
Led Zeppelin	North American Tour 1975	January 29, 1975	—N/a
Led Zeppelin	North American Tour 1977	May 31, 1977	—N/a
Lee Brice & Justin Moore	Made in America Tour	February 4, 2017	William Michael Morgan
Lil Baby	The Back Outside Tour	November 12, 2022	Gunna, Mooski, & 42 Dugg
Lil Wayne	I Am Music Tour	December 29, 2008	Keyshia Cole & T-Pain
Lil Wayne	I Am Music II Tour	April 8, 2011	Nicki Minaj, Rick Ross, Porcelain Black, Travis Barker, Mix Master Mike, Cory Gunz, & Birdman
Linkin Park	Meteora Tour	March 2, 2004	P.O.D., Hoobastank & Story of the Year
Lionel Richie and Earth, Wind & Fire	Sing a Song All Night Long Tour	July 18, 2016	—N/a
Little Big Town	Pain Killer Tour	October 15, 2015	Drake White & The Big Fire
Live	Songs from Black Mountain Tour	October 14, 2007	—N/a
Loggins and Messina	So Fine Tour	July 2, 1975	—N/a
The Lox	We Are the Streets Tour	March 16, 2000	DMX, Juvenile, Lil Wayne & Eve
Luis Miguel	Luis Miguel Tour 2023–24	June 11, 2024	—N/a
Luke Bryan	That's My Kind of Night Tour	February 17, 2014	Lee Brice & Kelleigh Bannen
Lynyrd Skynyrd	Nuthin' Fancy Tour	June 28, 1975	—N/a
Lynyrd Skynyrd	Street Survivors Tour	May 13, 1977	—N/a
Lynyrd Skynyrd	The Last of the Street Survivors Farewell Tour	November 13, 2021	Telsa
Lynyrd Skynyrd & ZZ Top	Sharp Dressed Simple Man Tour	March 29, 2024	Black Stone Cherry
Maluma	Papi Juancho Tour	October 3, 2022	—N/a
Marco Antonio Solís	Yla Historia Continúa Tour	September 3, 2017	Jesse and Joy
Martina McBride	Shine All Night Tour	April 30, 2010	Blake Shelton & The Lost Trailers
Mary J. Blige	Good Morning Gorgeous Tour	September 17, 2022	Ella Mai & Queen Naija
Mary J. Blige	For My Fans Tour	January 30, 2025	Mario & Ne-Yo
Matchbox Twenty	Mad Season Tour	September 20, 2000	The Jayhawks
Maxwell	The Night Tour	March 20, 2022	Anthony Hamilton
Megan Moroney	The Cloud 9 Tour	June 6, 2026	JP Saxe & Solon Holt
MercyMe	Always Only Jesus Tour	April 27, 2024	Newsboys
Metallica	Damaged Justice Tour	February 19, 1989	Queensrÿche
Metallica	Wherever We May Roam Tour	March 26, 1992	—N/a
Metallica	Poor Touring Me Tour	April 12, 1997	Corrosion of Conformity
Miley Cyrus	Best of Both Worlds Tour	November 25, 2007	Jonas Brothers
Miley Cyrus	Wonder World Tour	November 22, 2009	Metro Station
Miranda Lambert	On Fire Tour	February 19, 2012	Chris Young & Jerrod Niemann
Miranda Lambert	Roadside Bars & Pink Guitars Tour	November 23, 2019	Maren Morris & Ashley McBryde
The Monkees	North American Tour 1967	July 12, 1967	The Jimi Hendrix Experience
The Moody Blues	Octave Tour	November 15, 1978	Jimmie Spheeris
The Moody Blues	1994 Tour	March 17, 1994	—N/a
Mötley Crüe	Welcome to the Theatre of Pain Tour	December 13, 1985	—N/a
Mötley Crüe	Girls, Girls, Girls Tour	November 15, 1987	Guns N' Roses
Mötley Crüe	Mötley Crüe vs. The Earth Tour	October 28, 1997	—N/a
Mötley Crüe	Red, White & Crüe Tour	April 21, 2005	—N/a
Mötley Crüe	The Final Tour	October 22, 2014	Alice Cooper
Mountain	Avalanche Tour	June 21, 1974	—N/a
Mountain	Avalanche Tour	September 14, 1974	Wet Willie
NC A&T	Aggie Homecoming Concert 2023; Summer Walker, Lil Durk, Flo Milli, Coco Jones	November 4, 2023	—N/a
Needtobreathe	The Caves World Tour	November 17, 2023	Judah & the Lion
Neil Diamond	Beautiful Noise Tour	May 3, 1977	—N/a
Neil Diamond	You Don't Bring Me Flowers Tour	December 15, 1978	—N/a
Neil Diamond	Heartlight Tour	September 14, 1982	—N/a
New Edition	30th Anniversary Tour	February 17, 2012	—N/a
New Edition	Culture Tour	April 2, 2022	Charlie Wilson & Jodeci
New Edition	The New Edition Way Tour	February 26, 2026	Boyz II Men & Toni Braxton
Newsboys	Love Riot Tour	October 11, 2016	The Afters & Ryan Stevenson
Nickelback	Dark Horse Tour	April 17, 2010	Shinedown, Breaking Benjamin, & Sick Puppies
Nine Inch Nails	Lights in the Sky Tour	November 3, 2008	HEALTH
NKOTBSB	NKOTBSB Tour	July 21, 2011	Matthew Morrison
*NSYNC	No Strings Attached Tour	May 16, 2000	Sisqó & P!nk
The O'Jays	My Favorite Person Tour	June 18, 1982	Cameo, Atlantic Starr & One Way
The Oak Ridge Boys	Bobbie Sue Tour	February 19, 1982	T.J. Sheppard
Oliver Anthony	Out of the Woods Tour	April 26, 2024	—N/a
Orchestral Manoeuvres in the Dark	Crush Tour	December 6, 1985	Thompson Twins
The Osmonds	1971 North American Tour	August 27, 1971	—N/a
The Osmonds	1972 North American Tour	July 19, 1972	—N/a
The Osmonds	The Osmond Brothers Tour	July 6, 1982	—N/a
The Osmonds	One Way Rider Tour	April 4, 1984	—N/a
The Osmonds	One Way Rider Tour	April 5, 1984	—N/a
Ozzy Osbourne	Diary of a Madman Tour	April 30, 1982	Magnum
Ozzy Osbourne	The Ultimate Sin Tour	September 13, 1986	Queensrÿche
Ozzy Osbourne	No Rest for the Wicked Tour	November 22, 1988	Anthrax
Ozzy Osbourne	Ozzmosis Tour	May 17, 1996	—N/a
Panic! at the Disco	Death of a Bachelor Tour	April 11, 2017	MisterWives & Saint Motel
Parliament-Funkadelic	1976 Tour	November 21, 1976	—N/a
Parliament-Funkadelic	1979 Tour	February 9, 1979	The Brides of Funkenstein
Passion Pit	Campus Consciousness Tour	October 30, 2010	Black Joe Lewis & the Honeybears
Pat Benatar	Get Nervous Tour	February 13, 1983	—N/a
Paul McCartney	Out There Tour	October 30, 2014	—N/a
Pearl Jam	Binaural Tour	August 6, 2000	Sonic Youth & Lukin
Pentatonix	A Christmas Spectacular Tour	December 18, 2022	Girl Named Tom
Peso Pluma	Éxodo Tour	October 13, 2024	—N/a
Peter Frampton	I'm in You Tour	August 29, 1977	The J. Geils Band
Peter Frampton	Where I Should Be Tour	August 8, 1979	—N/a
Phil Collins	The No Jacket Required World Tour	May 22, 1985	—N/a
Phish	Round Room Tour	March 1, 2003	—N/a
The Police	Ghost in the Machine Tour	January 26, 1982	The Go-Go's & Joan Jett and the Blackhearts
The Police	Synchronicity Tour	February 10, 1984	—N/a
The Police	Synchronicity Tour	February 11, 1984	—N/a
Poison	Harder, Louder, Faster Tour	August 1, 2003	Skid Row & Vince Neil Band
Prince & The Revolution	1999 Tour	February 4, 1983	The Time & Vanity 6
Prince & The Revolution	Purple Rain Tour	November 14, 1984	Sheila E.
Prince & The Revolution	Purple Rain Tour	November 15, 1984	Sheila E.
Prince & The Revolution	Purple Rain Tour	November 16, 1984	Sheila E.
Prince & The Revolution	Lovesexy Tour	October 16, 1988	—N/a
Prince	Jam of the Year World Tour	November 8, 1997	—N/a
Prince	Welcome 2	March 26, 2011	Chaka Khan
Queen	The Game Tour	August 14, 1980	Dakota
Queensrÿche	Building Empires Tour	July 13, 1991	—N/a
R. Kelly	TP-2.com Tour	August 9, 2001	Sunshine Anderson & Syleena Johnson
Rascal Flatts	Me and My Gang Tour	February 24, 2006	Blake Shelton & Jason Aldean
Rascal Flatts	Changed Tour	February 15, 2013	The Band Perry & Kristen Kelly
Ratt	Dancing Undercover Tour	December 5, 1986	Poison, Cinderella & Loudness
RBD	Soy Rebelde Tour	September 3, 2023	—N/a
Reba McEntire	Starting Over Tour	April 1, 1996	—N/a
Reba McEntire	What If It's You Tour	April 18, 1997	Brooks & Dunn
Red Hot Chili Peppers	I'm with You World Tour	April 9, 2012	Santigold
REO Speedwagon	Hi Infidelity Tour	June 30, 1981	—N/a
REO Speedwagon	Good Trouble Tour	August 1, 1982	Survivor
REO Speedwagon	Wheels Are Turnin' Tour	March 1, 1985	Survivor
REO Speedwagon	Life as We Know It Tour	May 14, 1987	Joan Jett & The Blackhearts
REM	Green Tour	November 10, 1989	Pylon
REM	Monster Tour	November 11, 1995	Luscious Jackson
Rhett Akins	2004 Tour	June 5, 2004	—N/a
Rhythms of Triumph Concert	—	January 30, 2015	—N/a
Ricardo Montaner	Montaner Tour 2022	February 4, 2022	—N/a
Rick James	Fire It Up Tour	April 11, 1980	Prince & Kleeer
Rick James	Street Songs Tour	August 14, 1981	Teena Marie & Cameo
Rick James	Throwin' Down Tour	July 31, 1982	Dazz Band & One Day
Rick Ross	MMG Tour	December 7, 2012	Meek Mill & Wale
Rick Springfield	Success Hasn't Spoiled Me Yet Tour	May 22, 1982	—N/a
Rick Springfield	Tao Tour	July 14, 1985	—N/a
Ricky Martin	Livin' la Vida Loca Tour	June 13, 2000	—N/a
Rihanna	Loud Tour	July 16, 2011	J. Cole & CeeLo Green
Robert Plant	Now and Zen Tour	July 19, 1988	Cheap Trick
Robert Plant	Manic Nirvana Tour	October 15, 1990	The Black Crowes
Rod Stewart	Foot Loose & Fancy Free Tour	November 10, 1977	—N/a
Rod Stewart	Worth Leavin' Home For Tour	November 11, 1981	—N/a
Rod Stewart	Camouflage Tour	October 2, 1984	—N/a
Rod Stewart	Out of Order Tour	May 6, 1989	—N/a
Rod Stewart	Vagabond Heart Tour	January 12, 1992	—N/a
Rod Stewart	When We Were the New Boys Tour	March 13, 1999	—N/a
Rod Stewart	Live the Life Tour	October 17, 2013	Steve Winwood & Lucy Woodward
Roger Waters	Us + Them Tour	July 18, 2017	—N/a
The Rolling Stones	1975 Tour of the Americas	July 31, 1975	—N/a
The Rolling Stones	US Tour 1978	June 26, 1978	Peter Tosh & Etta James
Ronnie Milsap	Keyed Up Tour	November 19, 1983	Barbara Mandrell & Ricky Skaggs
Rush	A Farewell to Kings Tour	March 18, 1978	Pat Travers Band & The Babys
Rush	Hemispheres Tour	April 14, 1979	Molly Hatchet
Rush	Moving Pictures Tour	December 6, 1981	Riot
Rush	Signals Tour	March 27, 1983	Jon Butcher Axis
Rush	Power Windows Tour	April 22, 1986	Blue Öyster Cult
Rush	Time Machine Tour	April 2, 2011	—N/a
Sade	Sade Live	September 10, 2011	John Legend
Sam Hunt	Outskirts Tour	April 5, 2024	Brett Young & Lily Rose
Santana	Santana III Tour	October 21, 1971	—N/a
Santana	Caravanserai Tour	March 5, 1973	—N/a
Scorpions	Love at First Sting Tour	July 8, 1984	Bon Jovi
SCREAM	SCREAM Tour	August 2, 2002	—N/a
SCREAM	SCREAM Tour	August 29, 2003	—N/a
SCREAM	SCREAM Tour	August 27, 2005	—N/a
SCREAM	SCREAM Tour	November 24, 2006	—N/a
SGA Homecoming Concert	—	October 13, 2001	—N/a
Shania Twain	Come On Over Tour	November 20, 1999	Shane Minor
Shinedown	The Revolutions Live	May 3, 2022	The Pretty Reckless & Diamante
Sleep Token	Even in Arcadia Tour	September 20, 2025	Thornhill
Slipknot	All Hope Is Gone World Tour	February 9, 2009	Coheed and Cambria & Trivium
Slipknot	Knotfest Roadshow 2022	April 1, 2022	In This Moment & Wage War
Stevie Nicks	The Wild Heart Tour	July 10, 1983	Joe Walsh
Stevie Nicks & Rod Stewart	Heart & Soul Tour	August 1, 2012	—N/a
Stevie Ray Vaughan & Double Trouble	Couldn't Stand the Weather Tour	August 9, 1984	Huey Lewis and the News
Stevie Wonder	Sing Your Song! As We Fix Our Nation's Broken Heart Tour	October 17, 2024	—N/a
Sting	Brand New Day Tour	May 8, 2001	Jill Scott & Dominic Miller
Styx	The Grand Illusion Tour	March 12, 1978	—N/a
Styx	Pieces of Eight Tour	January 12, 1979	Cindy Bullens
Styx	Paradise Theater Tour	April 11, 1981	—N/a
Styx	Kilroy Was Here Tour	June 3, 1983	—N/a
Styx	Brave New World Tour	August 12, 1999	—N/a
Styx	Brave New World Tour	November 29, 2000	REO Speedwagon & Survivor
Superchick	ShoutFest Tour	June 11, 2007	—N/a
Tamar Braxton	Tamar Braxton Live	June 11, 2022	Monica & Tevin Campbell
Taylor Swift	Fearless Tour	June 12, 2009	Kellie Pickler & Gloriana
Taylor Swift	Speak Now World Tour	June 30, 2011	NEEDTOBREATHE & James Wesley
Taylor Swift	The Red Tour	September 12, 2013	Ed Sheeran & Casey James
Taylor Swift	The 1989 World Tour	October 21, 2015	Vance Joy; Miranda Lambert (surprise guest)
Ted Nugent	Cat Scratch Fever Tour	February 2, 1978	Sammy Hagar & Golden Earring
Teddy Pendergrass	Teddy Tour	July 13, 1979	Alton McClain and Destiny
Three Days Grace	One-X Tour	March 7, 2008	Seether & Breaking Benjamin
Three Dog Night	Harmony Tour	March 12, 1972	—N/a
Thomas Rhett	Home Team Tour	August 20, 2023	Cole Swindell
T.I. & Ciara	Screamfest '07 Tour	August 25, 2007	T-Pain & Yung Joc
T.I. & J. Cole	2013 Tour	November 2, 2013	Kelly Rowland & Juicy J
Tim McGraw	Live Like You Were Dying Tour	September 9, 2004	Big & Rich
Tim McGraw & Faith Hill	Soul2Soul Tour	October 17, 2000	The Warren Brothers
Tim McGraw & Faith Hill	Soul2Soul II Tour	July 20, 2007	Halfway to Hazard
Tim McGraw & Faith Hill	Soul2Soul: The World Tour	October 14, 2017	Steve Moakler
Tina Turner	Private Dancer Tour	November 23, 1985	—N/a
Tina Turner	Twenty Four Seven Tour	April 1, 2000	Lionel Richie & Janice Robinson
tobyMac	Awake Tonight Tour	December 9, 2010	Skillet
tobyMac	Hits Deep Tour 2025	January 25, 2025	Crowder, Cochren & Co., CAIN, Ryan Stevenson, & Terrain
Tom Jones	1979 Tour	May 18, 1979	—N/a
Toni Braxton & Kenny G	An Evening with Toni Braxton & Kenny G	February 21, 1997	—N/a
Tori Amos	On Scarlet's Walk Tour	February 26, 2003	Ben Folds
Trans-Siberian Orchestra	Christmas Eve and Other Stories	November 19, 2005	—N/a
Trans-Siberian Orchestra	Christmas Eve and Other Stories	November 15, 2006	—N/a
Trans-Siberian Orchestra	Christmas Eve and Other Stories	December 19, 2007	—N/a
Trans-Siberian Orchestra	Christmas Eve and Other Stories	November 21, 2008	—N/a
Trans-Siberian Orchestra	Christmas Eve and Other Stories	November 25, 2009	—N/a
Trans-Siberian Orchestra	Christmas Eve and Other Stories	December 8, 2010	—N/a
Trans-Siberian Orchestra	Christmas Eve and Other Stories	December 7, 2011	—N/a
Trans-Siberian Orchestra	The Lost Christmas Eve	December 2, 2012	—N/a
Trans-Siberian Orchestra	The Lost Christmas Eve	November 24, 2013	—N/a
Trans-Siberian Orchestra	The Christmas Attic	November 26, 2014	—N/a
Trans-Siberian Orchestra	The Ghosts of Christmas Eve	November 21, 2015	—N/a
Trans-Siberian Orchestra	The Ghosts of Christmas Eve	December 11, 2016	—N/a
Trans-Siberian Orchestra	The All-New Christmas Eve and Other Stories	December 11, 2019	—N/a
Trans-Siberian Orchestra	The Ghosts of Christmas Eve	November 19, 2023	—N/a
Trans-Siberian Orchestra	The Ghosts of Christmas Eve	November 20, 2025	—N/a
Twenty One Pilots	Emotional Roadshow World Tour	February 25, 2017	Judah and the Lion, Jon Bellion, & Travis Mendes
Uriah Heep	Sweet Freedom Tour	September 12, 1973	Earth, Wind & Fire
Usher	OMG Tour	December 7, 2010	Miguel & Trey Songz
Van Halen	Fair Warning Tour	August 25, 1981	—N/a
Van Halen	Hide Your Sheep Tour	July 16, 1982	After the Fire
Van Halen	1984 Tour	February 3, 1984	Autograph
Van Halen	1986 Tour	May 16, 1986	—N/a
Van Halen	OU812 Tour	October 6, 1988	—N/a
Van Halen	Van Halen Summer Tour 2004	June 11, 2004	Silvertide
Van Halen	2007–2008 North American Tour	September 29, 2007	Ky-Mani Marley
Van Halen	A Different Kind of Truth Tour	April 21, 2012	Kool & the Gang
Village People	Cruisin' Tour	May 10, 1979	Gloria Gaynor
Weird Al Yankovic	Bigger & Weirder Tour	June 5, 2026	Puddles Pity Party
Whitney Houston	Moment of Truth World Tour	August 9, 1987	Kenny G
Whitney Houston	I'm Your Baby Tonight World Tour	June 16, 1991	After 7
Whitney Houston	My Love Is Your Love World Tour	June 16, 1999	112
The Who	1975 North American Tour	November 28, 1975	Toots and the Maytals
The Who	1980 North American Tour	July 13, 1980	—N/a
The Who	Quadrophenia and More Tour	November 9, 2012	Vintage Trouble
The Wiggles	Wiggledancing! Live On Stage	August 26, 2006 (2 shows)	—N/a
Willie Nelson	The Sound in Your Mind Tour	May 14, 1976	Poco
Willie Nelson	Stardust Tour	May 11, 1979	Leon Russell
Willie Nelson	Somewhere Over the Rainbow Tour	December 12, 1981	—N/a
Winter Jam Tour Spectacular		March 2, 2003	—N/a
Winter Jam Tour Spectacular		January 9, 2004	—N/a
Winter Jam Tour Spectacular		February 10, 2005	—N/a
Winter Jam Tour Spectacular		February 25, 2006	—N/a
Winter Jam Tour Spectacular		February 18, 2007	—N/a
Winter Jam Tour Spectacular		February 12, 2008	—N/a
Winter Jam Tour Spectacular		February 21, 2009	—N/a
Winter Jam Tour Spectacular		February 6, 2010	—N/a
Winter Jam Tour Spectacular		February 5, 2011	—N/a
Winter Jam Tour Spectacular		February 4, 2012	—N/a
Winter Jam Tour Spectacular		February 16, 2013	—N/a
Winter Jam Tour Spectacular		February 15, 2014	—N/a
Winter Jam Tour Spectacular		February 14, 2015	—N/a
Winter Jam Tour Spectacular		February 27, 2016	—N/a
Winter Jam Tour Spectacular		March 26, 2017	—N/a
Winter Jam Tour Spectacular		February 24, 2018	—N/a
Winter Jam Tour Spectacular		February 23, 2019	—N/a
Winter Jam Tour Spectacular		February 26, 2022	—N/a
Winter Jam Tour Spectacular		February 25, 2023	—N/a
Winter Jam Tour Spectacular		February 15, 2025	—N/a
Winter Jam Tour Spectacular		February 14, 2026	—N/a
WJMH 102.1 JAMZ	SuperJam	June 20, 1997	—N/a
WJMH 102.1 JAMZ	SuperJam	June 19, 1998	—N/a
WJMH 102.1 JAMZ	SuperJam	June 22, 2001	—N/a
WJMH 102.1 JAMZ	SuperJam	June 21, 2002	—N/a
WJMH 102.1 JAMZ	SuperJam	June 27, 2003	—N/a
WJMH 102.1 JAMZ	SuperJam	June 24, 2005	—N/a
WJMH 102.1 JAMZ	SuperJam	June 30, 2006	—N/a
WJMH 102.1 JAMZ	SuperJam	June 29, 2007	—N/a
WJMH 102.1 JAMZ	SuperJam	June 27, 2008	—N/a
WJMH 102.1 JAMZ	SuperJam	June 19, 2009	—N/a
WJMH 102.1 JAMZ	13th Anniversary Jam	January 29, 2010	—N/a
WJMH 102.1 JAMZ	SuperJam	June 25, 2010	—N/a
WJMH 102.1 JAMZ	SuperJam	June 17, 2011	—N/a
WJMH 102.1 JAMZ	SuperJam	June 29, 2012	—N/a
WJMH 102.1 JAMZ	SuperJam	June 21, 2013	—N/a
WJMH 102.1 JAMZ	SuperJam	June 27, 2014	—N/a
Yes	Close to the Edge Tour	November 12, 1972	—N/a
Yes	Relayer Tour	November 24, 1974	—N/a
Yes	Tormato Tour	September 14, 1978	—N/a
Yes	90125 Tour	September 14, 1984	—N/a
Yes	35th Anniversary Tour	April 27, 2004	—N/a
Zac Brown Band	Uncaged Tour	January 26, 2013	Blackberry Smoke & Levi Lowrey
Zach Bryan	The Quittin' Time Tour	August 3, 2024	Matt Maeson
Zach Bryan	The Quittin' Time Tour	August 4, 2024	Levi Turner
Zach Top	Cold Beer & Country Music Tour	October 23, 2025	Andy Buckner
ZZ Top	Tres Hombres Tour	July 27, 1974	—N/a
ZZ Top	Worldwide Texas Tour	February 10, 1977	—N/a
ZZ Top	Expect No Quarter Tour	November 16, 1980	—N/a
ZZ Top	El Loco-Motion Tour	January 15, 1982	—N/a
ZZ Top	XXX Tour	September 22, 1999	Lynyrd Skynyrd & Screamin' Cheetah Wheelies

== Expansions ==
=== 1972 ===
After the Greensboro Coliseum started to get fame, in 1968, the people of Greensboro voted to increase the capacity of the Coliseum from 9,000 to 15,500 to meet the demands. It was eventually approved and the construction started in 1970. The brand-new arena was completed in 1972. When it was finished it had many more events at the venue.

=== 1978 ===
In 1978, they expanded the Coliseum and expanded the Special Events Center to connect to the Coliseum. It was called the "Exhibition Center" at the time with three new exhibition centers and eight meeting rooms. It was renamed to the Special Events Center after a new arena was made.

=== 1993 ===
In 1991, the Coliseum's manager (Jim Evans) proposed an additional expansion of the complex. The construction started two years later in 1993. This expansion would raise the seating capacity of the Coliseum an additional 8,000 (adding a third tier) to 23,000; however, this capacity would later be lowered to around 20,000 after renovations in the late 2010s.

== Sports ==
=== Basketball ===
The Carolina Cougars of the American Basketball Association played a majority of their home games at the Greensboro Coliseum during their tenure in North Carolina from 1969 to 1974, before moving to St. Louis and becoming the Spirits of St. Louis. The Greensboro City Gaters played their first and only season as a charter franchise of the Global Basketball Association minor league in 1991–1992 in the Greensboro Coliseum.

From 1959 to 1989, the Wake Forest Demon Deacons basketball team played a portion of its home schedule at the Coliseum, usually games against popular opponents that could not be accommodated in the smaller Winston-Salem Memorial Coliseum. In practice, Wake Forest played most of its ACC games during this period at the Coliseum. The opening of the much larger LJVM Coliseum on the site of the old Winston-Salem Coliseum in 1989 moved all Demon Deacon home games back to Winston-Salem. From the 1960s to the 1980s, North Carolina, Duke and North Carolina State frequently played neutral-site games at the Coliseum, as it was the state's largest arena at the time. The Tar Heels still occasionally play a neutral-site game here, as late as 2012, while the Wolfpack most recently played a game in Greensboro in 2025. Between its service as Wake Forest's de facto primary home court and its many neutral-site and postseason games, the Coliseum has hosted many of the most important basketball games in North Carolina's history.

Since 2010, the UNC Greensboro Spartans men's basketball team has played at the Coliseum, having moved there from the smaller Fleming Gymnasium on the campus of UNCG. For Spartans games, most of the upper level is curtained off; this leaves a capacity of about 7,500.

The Coliseum has played host to many college basketball tournaments. The Coliseum has hosted games during 14 NCAA Division I men's tournaments (with its most recent being first and second round games in 2023); it hosted the 1974 Final Four (where the NC State Wolfpack won the national championship in its first appearance in the game), as well as Lehigh's upset of Duke in 2012. It also hosted the NCAA Division I women's tournament in 2007 and 2008. The Atlantic Coast Conference (ACC) has held its men's basketball tournament at the Coliseum 26 times since 1967, the most of any venue. This is in part because the arena was within seven hours' drive of the conference's original footprint, and is within an hour of most of the fanbases of the conference's heartland in North Carolina. Barring one year, it also hosted the ACC women's basketball tournament from 2000 to 2025. Beginning in 2027, First Horizon Coliseum and the Spectrum Center in Charlotte will host the men's and women's tournaments on a two-year rotation; the men's tournament will be in Greensboro in odd-numbered years and the women's tournament in even-numbered years, and vice versa for Charlotte.

The Greensboro Coliseum hosted the Big Four Tournament from 1971 to 1981, and the MEAC men's basketball tournament ten times. It was also the host of the Southern Conference men's basketball tournament from 1996 to 1999.

=== Ice hockey ===
The hockey history of Greensboro began in 1959, when the Greensboro Generals of the Eastern Hockey League arrived and competed until the league folded in 1973. The team moved to the Southern Hockey League for four seasons until it too ceased operations in January 1977.

Greensboro hockey's modern era began with the establishment of the Greensboro Monarchs of the East Coast Hockey League, who played from 1989–90 to 1994–95. When the American Hockey League expanded southward in 1995, it invited Greensboro to join; the new team took the Monarchs nickname, but attempted to draw a more regional fan base by labeling themselves the Carolina Monarchs.

When the Hartford Whalers announced their move to Raleigh, North Carolina, in 1997 as the Carolina Hurricanes, they leased the Coliseum for two years while waiting for the Raleigh Entertainment and Sports Arena (now Lenovo Center) in Raleigh to be completed. Subjected to ticket price increases and unwilling to support a team that was destined for Raleigh, Greensboro hockey fans rarely filled the arena for Hurricane games. Meanwhile, Triangle fans were unwilling to make the hour-long drive across Interstate 40 to Greensboro. As a result, the Hurricanes played in front of some of the smallest NHL crowds since the 1950s. During the 1998–99 season, the team curtained off most of the upper deck for home games in an effort to artificially create scarcity in the ticket market, force would-be attendees to purchase higher-priced tickets, and hide what national media mocked as "green acres" of empty seats.

Once the Raleigh Entertainment and Sports Arena was completed and the Hurricanes moved out, the plan was that the Monarchs, who spent those two years in New Haven, Connecticut, as the Beast of New Haven, would move back into the venue as a Hurricanes affiliate. Monarchs owner Bill Black tried to bring the Monarchs back to Greensboro, but the Hurricanes refused to claim the Monarchs as their affiliate. After the deal fell through, Bill Black tried to sell shares to the public in a final attempt to bring the Monarchs back to Greensboro.

Rather than leave the Coliseum without a hockey team for the first time in more than 10 years, a new hockey team was founded, the Greensboro Generals, returning the city to the East Coast Hockey League. The Generals competed in the arena until 2004, when they were terminated by the ECHL due to poor performance and lackluster support from the community. Increased operating expenses from the ECHL Players Union and overhead costs as a result of recent Coliseum renovations significantly affected the Generals' ability to promote within the community. It was revealed that after the team folded, nearly all of the money used to support the team over and above ticket revenues, could have been covered by Coliseum advertising revenue that was purchased as a direct result of the hockey team's presence.

After the Generals folded, the complex saw a significant revenue drop in local advertising and to this day, the Coliseum operations must be supplemented with nearly $2 million a year from the city government.

On October 18, 2024, the ECHL announced that an expansion franchise had been awarded to Greensboro and that the new team would begin play at the Coliseum in the 2025-2026 season. The League would later announce on January 14, 2025 that the team would be named the Greensboro Gargoyles.

=== Arena football ===
The Coliseum first saw an arena football team when the Greensboro Prowlers of the af2 league played in the Coliseum from 1999 until 2004. The team folded due to a poor record and lack of fan support. The Greensboro Revolution of the National Indoor Football League played here in 2006 and 2007. The team ceased operations on January 23, 2008.

In 2018, the Coliseum began to host the Carolina Cobras, an expansion team of the National Arena League. The Cobras went on to win the league championship, going 10–5 in the regular season and winning their two playoff games, both hosted at the Coliseum. They defeated the Columbus Lions with a final score of 66–8. The team is still in operation today and has played for the championship in 4 of the last 5 seasons.

== Tenants ==
Some of the past and present tenants at the First Horizon Coliseum.

Tenants
Greensboro Gargoyles	ECHL	2025–present
Carolina Cowboys	PBR	2023–present
Carolina Cobras	NAL	2018–present
Greensboro Roller Derby	WFTDA	2010–present
UNC Greensboro Spartans	SoCon	2009–present
Greensboro Revolution	NIFL	2006–07
Greensboro Prowlers	AF2	2000–03
Atlantic Coast Conference	Men's basketball tournament	1967–present
Atlantic Coast Conference	Women's basketball tournament	2000–2025
Greensboro Generals	ECHL	1999–2004
Carolina Hurricanes	NHL	1997–99
Carolina Monarchs	AHL	1995–97
Greensboro City Gators	GBA	1991–92
Greensboro Monarchs	ECHL	1989–95
NCAA Final Four	NCAA	1974
Carolina Cougars	ABA	1969–74
Wake Forest Demon Deacons	ACC	1959–89
Greensboro Generals	EHL / SHL	1959–77

== See also ==
- Greensboro Complex
- List of indoor arenas by capacity
