= Avnet (disambiguation) =

Avnet may refer to:

- Avnet, Inc., American electronics distributor company
- Charles Avnet (1888–1979), American businessman and founder of Avnet, Inc.
- Jon Avnet (b. 1949), American director, writer, and producer
