= William Amelio =

American business executive

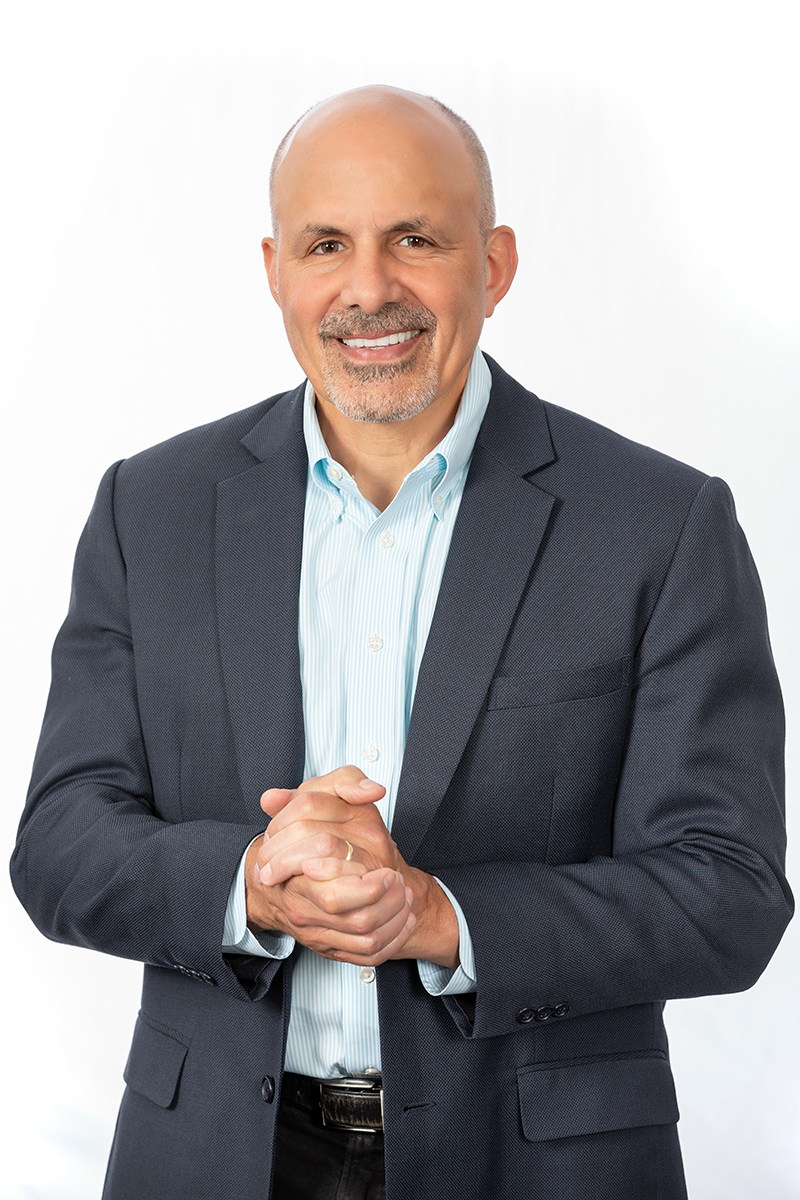
- Education: Lehigh University; Stanford University
- Occupation: Business executive
- Title: CEO
- Spouse: Jamie
- Children: 6

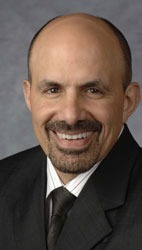
Amelio as CEO of Lenovo

William J. "Bill" Amelio is an American business executive who as CEO of Lenovo from 2005 to 2009. He also was CEO of Avnet. In April 2026, Amelio became the global CEO of Orivium, a mining technology company.

Before joining Lenovo, Amelio held senior executive positions at NCR Corporation, Honeywell, and IBM

In 2003, Amelio and his wife Jamie founded Caring for Cambodia, a non-profit organization that educates Cambodian children.

== Education ==
Amelio earned a bachelor's degree in chemical engineering from Lehigh University. He also holds a master's degree in Management from Stanford University, where he was a Sloan Fellow.

== Career ==
Amelio began his career with IBM Corporation in 1979 and worked his way up to General Manager Worldwide Operations, Distribution and Reengineering of the Personal Computer Division before leaving for AlliedSignal in 1997.

Between 2000 and 2001, Amelio was Executive President and Chief Operating Officer of NCR Corporation's Retail Solutions, Financial Solutions, Worldwide Customer Service and Systemedia businesses, responsible for $5 billion in revenue and 27,000 employees worldwide. He arrived at NCR after a stint with Honeywell International Inc. (formerly AlliedSignal). Between 1999 and 2000 he was the company's President and CEO in charge of Transportation and Power Systems. Amelio, who started with the firm in 1997, was initially responsible for Turbocharging Systems and reestablished AlliedSystems as the industry leader in the technology.

Between 2005 and 2009 he held the chief executive officer position with Chinese technology company Lenovo Group Ltd., manufacturers of personal computers, laptops, servers and other computer hardware. As Lenovo's president and CEO, he oversaw the integration of the IBM PC Division, which the company purchased in 2005 for $1.75 billion. Lenovo, with 30,000 employees, experienced an annual revenue growth increase from $13 billion to $15 billion by 2008 under his leadership. During that period the company grew its brand internationally and, for seven successive quarters, had sales profits greater than the market. Amelio's three-year contract was not renewed after Lenovo posted a 2008 fourth quarter loss of $97 million.

In August 2010, Amelio became the CEO of CHC Helicopter Service AS. In February 2015, CHC Group Ltd., the parent company of CHC Helicopter, announced that the board of directors had appointed Karl Fessenden as chief executive officer and a member of the board of directors, replacing William Amelio.

In July 2016 Amelio was appointed as Interim CEO of Avnet. Amelio was officially appointed Avnet CEO in September, 2016. As CEO of Avnet, Amelio executed the divestiture of Avnet's Technology Solutions to Tech Data in September 2016, a transaction valued close to US$2.6 billion. A month later, he led the acquisition of UK-based Premier Farnell, a distributor of technology products and solutions and also known for manufacturing and distributing more than half the world's Raspberry Pi single board computers.

In August 2020, Amelio stepped down from Avnet, with Phil Gallagher being named as Interim CEO.

In April 2026, Amelio assumed the role of global CEO of Orivium, a mining technology company that extracts copper and other critical minerals from mining waste and hard-to-process ores.

== Philanthropy ==
Amelio and his wife Jamie, through the Amelio Foundation, founded Caring for Cambodia in 2003, a non-profit organization which educates Cambodia children by building schools, training teachers and providing for basic needs. Milestones achieved by 2011 included supporting 5,300 students, training 100 teachers, managing and supporting six schools and stocking four libraries with books and resources. He also adopted two children from Cambodia.
