= Rick Hamada =

American businessman (born 1957/58)

- Born: Richard P. Hamada; 1957 or 1958 (age 68–69)
- Known for: CEO, Avnet (2011–16)
- Board member of: National University, Keysight Technologies

Richard P. Hamada (born 1957/58) is an American businessman. He was CEO of Avnet, Inc. from July 4, 2011 to July 10, 2016. On July 11, 2016, Hamada stepped down as CEO and board member William Amelio was appointed as interim CEO.
