= CPC (company) =

Combined Precision Components
- Type: Public
- Industry: Consumer Electronics
- Founded: 1967
- Headquarters: Preston, United Kingdom
- Key people: Chris Haworth, Managing Director
- Parent: Premier Farnell
- Website: cpc.farnell.com

CPC is a British end-user and business-to-business distributor of electrical and related products. Since 1995 it has been a brand of Farnell, which itself was acquired by Avnet in 2016.

== History ==
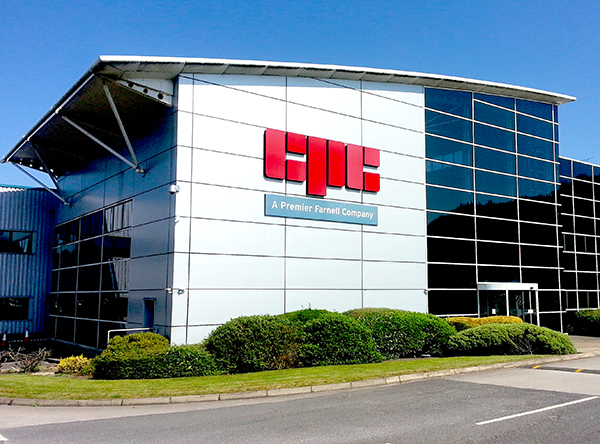

Established in 1967, Combined Precision Components Ltd was acquired by British company Farnell Electronics (later Premier Farnell) in May 1995. Premier Farnell was in turn acquired by American company Avnet in 2016.

CPC's distribution centre is at Preston, Lancashire, close to the M6 motorway.

CPC was the host of the UK's first Raspberry Pi hack day, held in Leeds in December 2012. The 24-hour event focused on programming solely using the credit card-sized computer.
