= 102 Jamz =

102 Jamz may refer to:

- WJMH, a mainstream urban radio station licensed to Reidsville, North Carolina
- WJHM, a classic hip-hop radio station at 101.9 FM licensed to Daytona Beach, Florida
