= Newark (company) =

American electronic components distributor

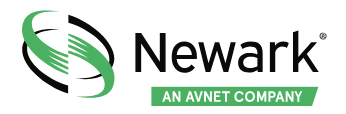
- Type: Subsidiary
- Industry: Electronic components
- Founded: 1934
- Area served: North America
- Key people: Rebeca Obregon
- Parent: Avnet
- Website: newark.com

Newark, also called Newark Electronics, Newark element14, or Newark (an Avnet Company), is an electronic components distributor serving North America and parts of Central and South America. Founded in 1934 as Newark Electric, a small Chicago shop selling radio parts, the company is the Americas division of Farnell Global (part of Avnet) and is one of the largest electronics distributors worldwide.

== History ==
The firm was first established in 1934 as Newark Electric, a small shop in Chicago that sold radio parts. The name Newark pays homage to Newark, New Jersey. The company published its first paper catalog in 1948. Over the course of the next three decades, Newark Electronic's phonebook-sized catalog grew to be a widely recognized hallmark within the electronic components industry, occasionally being likened to "the bible of the industry".

In 1968, Newark was acquired by the Premier Industrial Corporation and became the corporation's Electronics Distribution Division. In 1996 the Premier Industrial Corporation was bought by Farnell Electronics, which then changed its name to Premier Farnell.

== Operations ==
Newark markets and distributes electronic components and test equipment for engineers and maintenance professionals throughout the US, Canada and Mexico. Products include connectors, relays, switches, semiconductors, sensors, test equipment and tools from companies including Texas Instruments, 3M, Belden, Freescale and Honeywell, among others. Newark's warehouse serving customers throughout the Americas is based in Gaffney, South Carolina.

== element14 Community ==
Newark is home to the element14 Community, an online information hub and forum for electrical engineers.

== See also ==
- Premier Farnell (Farnell Global)
- Avnet
