= WQMG =

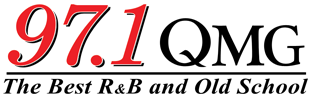
- Greensboro, North Carolina; United States
- Broadcast area: Piedmont Triad
- Frequency: 97.1 MHz
- Branding: 97.1 QMG

Programming
- Format: Urban Adult Contemporary
- Affiliations: Premiere Networks

Ownership
- Owner: Audacy, Inc.; (Audacy License, LLC)
- Sister stations: WJMH; WPAW; WSMW

History
- First air date: July 8, 1962
- Call sign meaning: "Where Quality Music Lives in Greensboro"

Technical information
- Licensing authority: FCC
- Facility ID: 47078
- Class: C0
- ERP: 100,000 watts
- HAAT: 327 meters (1,073 ft)
- Transmitter coordinates: 35°56′42.5″N 79°51′44.1″W

Links
- Public license information: Public file; LMS
- Webcast: Listen live (via Audacy)
- Website: www.audacy.com/wqmg

WQMG (97.1 FM) is a commercial radio station licensed to Greensboro, North Carolina, United States, and serves the Piedmont Triad, including High Point and Winston-Salem. It is owned by Audacy, Inc. and features an urban adult contemporary format with studios near the Piedmont Triad International Airport.

WQMG's transmitter is situated off Osbourne Road in High Point.

== History ==
=== WFMY ===
The earliest roots of this station date to 1948. An FM station with the call sign WFMY began broadcasting on 97.3 MHz. It was owned by the Greensboro News Company, publishers of the Greensboro Daily News and Daily Record (now merged as the Greensboro News & Record). One year after its founding, its owners put WFMY-TV channel 2 on the air. It was the first television station in Greensboro and the second in North Carolina.

The FM station was taken off the air in 1953 after broadcasting for five years. The Greensboro News Company decided to devote more of its resources to the television station and didn't think the FM station would become profitable.

=== WQMG ===
A new station signed on the air on July 8, 1962. It broadcast on 97.1 MHz with the call letters WQMG, which stand for "Where Quality Music lives in Greensboro." With its new 20,000-watt facility, the station was the first in the southeast to broadcast in FM stereo. WQMG played middle of the road (MOR) music and was known as "Stereo Island."

By the mid-1970s, WQMG had flipped to urban contemporary music. It was quite successful, using the slogan "Power 97 FM". By 1996, the station shifted in an adult direction with the slogan "Classic Soul...Smooth R&B". The change was due to WQMG becoming co-owned with its chief competitor, 102.1 WJMH. Management decided to make WJMH the more youthful urban station and allow WQMG to go more adult. Following the format change of competitor 105.7 WMKS, WQMG became the primary Urban AC station for the Triad radio market. In 1999, WQMG was acquired by Entercom.

=== Current and past shows ===
From March 1997 to 2015, WQMG was the Triad's home of the nationally syndicated "Tom Joyner Morning Show". Shilynne Cole and Busta Brown began hosting a local late-morning show, and Renee Vaughn, who was a local host during Joyner's show, moved to middays.

The "Steve Harvey Morning Show" began airing on WQMG on November 9, 2015. Local hosts are heard in middays and afternoons. The station also airs a "Quiet Storm" show most evenings and urban gospel on Sunday mornings.

In November–December 2021, WQMG achieved a rating of 13.0, the largest share in the history of the station. WQMG is often the top station on the Triad's radio dial.
