= WSMW =

Radio station in Greensboro, North Carolina

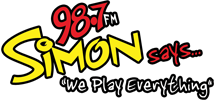
- Greensboro, North Carolina; United States
- Broadcast area: Piedmont Triad
- Frequency: 98.7 MHz (HD Radio)
- Branding: 98.7 Simon

Programming
- Language: English
- Format: Adult hits
- Subchannels: HD2: Sports gambling "The Bet"

Ownership
- Owner: Audacy, Inc.; (Audacy License, LLC)
- Sister stations: WJMH; WPAW; WQMG

History
- First air date: January 9, 1958
- Former call signs: WMDE (1958–73); WPET-FM (1973); WRQK (1973–85); WKSI (1985–2002); WOZN (2002–05)
- Former frequencies: 98.5 MHz (1958–60s)
- Call sign meaning: "Simon"

Technical information
- Licensing authority: FCC
- Facility ID: 71272
- Class: C0
- ERP: 100,000 watts
- HAAT: 375 meters (1,230 ft)
- Transmitter coordinates: 35°56′42.5″N 79°51′44.1″W

Links
- Public license information: Public file; LMS
- Webcast: Listen live (via Audacy); Listen live (via Audacy) (HD2)
- Website: www.audacy.com/987simon

WSMW (98.7 FM) is an adult hits station licensed to Greensboro, North Carolina, United States. It serves the Piedmont Triad region, including High Point and Winston-Salem. The Audacy, Inc. outlet uses the slogan "We Play Everything!"

WSMW broadcasts with an ERP of 100,000 watts at a height above average terrain of 375 meters (1230 feet). The signal provides secondary coverage as far as Charlotte to the south and Raleigh to the east. The station's studios are located near the Piedmont Triad International Airport and the transmitter site is in unincorporated south Guilford County.

== History ==
=== Early years ===
On January 9, 1958, WMDE first signed on at 98.5 MHz. Owner Hall Electronics originally used the experimental call sign W4MDE. In the early 1960s, WMDE moved to 98.7, a frequency used from 1948 to 1950 by WCTP. Early formats on WMDE included classical music, middle of the road music and jazz. In 1966, WMDE played country music and aired Tobacco Radio Network news. Suburban Broadcasting sold WMDE to Mido Broadcasting in 1973 and the station became WPET-FM, airing Southern gospel music as a sister station to AM 950 WPET.

=== The WRQK era ===
Starting in November 1973, the station increased power to 100,000 watts and went with a Top 40/Oldies format referred to as "Rock N' Gold" with the call letters WRQK. Artists included Bachman-Turner Overdrive, Parliament, General Johnson and the Chairmen of the Board. Studios for WRQK and WPET were on Meadowview Road near the Greensboro Depot. Drivers passing by could see the DJs through the three glass walls, and some even yelled their requests to the DJs. Battleground Avenue had billboards showing the DJs. At one time the station's name was K-99. WRQK leaned toward classic rock in 1980, when it was also called "Heart of Gold". Later the name became "99-RQK".

In 1982, the station switched to Top 40. The following year in 1983, rival station 99.5 WMAG made its debut, giving away a Rolls-Royce. WRQK co-owner Tom Armshaw countered by giving away a blue Corvette. WMAG significantly hurt the station's ratings, making a change necessary. A.H. Robins bought the station for $7.6 million. Beginning in the middle of 1984, the station became an affiliate of Dan Ingram's Top 40 Satellite Survey.

=== Switch to Kiss-FM ===
On June 23, 1985, WRQK became CHR WKSI "98-7 Kiss FM", changing from adult contemporary, oldies and beach music. The station was programmed during the mid/late 1980s by Big Steve Kelly and then Dale O'Brian. O'Brian was hired as the music director and night jock following the departure of Dave Denver. O'Brian later hosted mornings following the departure of Jim Quinn. Big Steve left the station for Cleveland in the late 80's, and O'Brian was named PD/Operations Manager. The station enjoyed the reputation of being one of the leading top 40 stations in the Carolinas. In 1989, O'Brian left to sign on WMXF/MIX 96 in Fayetteville, North Carolina. Other alumni include Dave Stone, Kelly Masters, Beth Ann McBride, Sammy Simpson, Scott Robbins, Sean Michaels, Ken Morrison, Robin Lambert, Skip Presson and Nancy Lee. The station would evolve to a modern rock-leaning adult top 40 by 1995 (after a brief stint as a country station "98-7 Kiss Country"). The station would also change its slogan to "The Point" in 1997, and by 2002, changed it again to "The Zone" along with the new call letters WOZN.

=== Move to adult hits ===
In 2005, the station added songs from the variety hits genre and held an online vote to see in the station should keep its Hot AC format or change to Adult Hits (even though at the time, the owners were planning to change it anyway.) Perhaps not surprisingly, Adult Hits won, with the station changing its call sign to WSMW and joining the list of stations embracing the format by introducing "Simon" to the market, not unlike the Jack FM format that was popular in many cities. The name "Simon" is a reference to the children's game "Simon Says", where Simon gets to say whatever songs he would like to hear from the music library.

The station later added a morning show hosted by Jeff Wicker, voted "best Triad radio personality" for 2007 on GoTriad.com. Wicker's co-hosts were "Skip the Prize Guy" & Carmen Brown. Currently, weekdays begin with the "Get Up! Show", hosted by Sean Sellers, a native of Henderson, North Carolina, who had been a DJ at WDCG, a top 40 station in the Raleigh market, as well as stops in the Virginia Beach and Washington D.C. markets, and Matty, a native of NH, whose resume includes WHFS in Washington DC. On several occasions, the "Get Up! Show" has started to share the famous and elusive "Secret recipe for million dollar fudge" live on the air, only to have the signal mysteriously overtaken by heavy static or the transmitter shut off.

The station originally focused on playing music of multiple genres, eras, and styles, from as far back as the 1960s to present. In recent times, the station has removed the majority of the newer music and focused mainly on 1970s and 1980s classic hits alongside some 1990s music.

On February 23, 2022, WSMW added The Bet to its HD3 subchannel.
