= 102 JAMZ SuperJam =

Annual summer concert in the United States

Coordinates: 36°3′35″N 79°49′32″W

102 JAMZ' SuperJam was an annual summer concert starring some of the hottest artists in hip hop, hosted by Urban Contemporary radio station WJMH (102 JAMZ)/Greensboro, North Carolina. The show was held at the 20,000+ seat Greensboro Coliseum each year. Since launching the event in 1997, SuperJam has attracted thousands of listeners from North Carolina with numerous annual attendees traveling from locations throughout the United States. There were eighteen consecutive SuperJam concert events.

== SuperJam performing artists ==
The station's debut summer show, SuperJam, took place Friday night, June 20, 1997, at Greensboro Coliseum in front of 20,000 fans and featured Bone Thugs-n-Harmony, Junior M.A.F.I.A., Lil' Kim, OutKast, Lost Boyz, SWV, Freak Nasty and others. Successive annual SuperJams have included artists such as Jay-Z, J. Cole, Diddy, T.I., Future, Busta Rhymes, Rick Ross, Wale, T-Pain, Jeezy, LL Cool J, Gucci Mane, Soulja Boy, Ludacris, Ja Rule, 2 Chainz, Nas, Lil Jon & the East Side Boyz, Plies, Ying Yang Twins, Cam'ron, Lloyd, Three 6 Mafia, Yo Gotti, Big Pun, Chingy, Fat Joe, Young Thug, Slick Rick, Tank, N.O.R.E., Travis Porter, Trina, Jermaine Dupri, Petey Pablo, K Camp, Doug E. Fresh, DJ Kool, The-Dream, Trick Daddy, Flo Rida, Dru Hill, Sheek Louch, Shawty Lo, Redman, Roscoe Dash, Ray-J, Da Brat, Fabolous and many more.

== SuperJam logistics ==
All SuperJam concerts took place on Friday nights in late June and have been held at the Greensboro Coliseum. Showtime has remained 7:30 PM throughout. The entire 102 JAMZ airstaff, the 102 JAMZ Mix Squad and the JAMZ Street Team actively participated in each event, hosting during the time between acts and emceeing during Mix Squad intervals. Beginning with SuperJam VII, the 102 JAMZ Dancers, led by Lady C of Sunday night's 11:00 Reggae Jamz show, performed a choreographed routine between acts during each SuperJam, through the 2011 show. The first ten 102 JAMZ SuperJam concerts were numbered consecutively, with the exception of the 1st (simply called SuperJam) and 4th (SuperJam 2000).

SuperJam ticket prices consistently remained significantly lower than those of other music concerts, from the outset. Ticket prices begin at $10 each, with mid-level tickets offered at $19.50 and $25, floor seats at $35, and some higher priced Platinum Seats available. As Program Director, Brian Douglas, explains, "From the beginning, we've seen SuperJam as the biggest opportunity we have each year to give back to our listeners. Concert ticket prices keep getting higher and higher... often $100 and more for the good shows. With SuperJam, it's all about more acts for less money. The goal is always to be sure every listener can afford a ticket and every show is one they'll remember."

== 102 JAMZ' SuperJam Block Party ==
From 1999 to 2011, each SuperJam concert was preceded by a 102 JAMZ Block Party, hosted by the station's afternoon personality (originally Boogie D, later Big Tap Money). These "party before the party" events, first held outside the coliseum, later in the Greensboro Coliseum Pavilion, and in 2010 and 2011 in the Coliseum West Wing B, feature hundreds of ticket upgrades, impromptu performances by the night's talent lineup and live, interactive artist interviews. SuperJam Block Parties were carried live on 102 JAMZ, from 3:00 to 7:00 PM, to set the stage for the show and prepare the listeners for the concert.

== SuperJam background ==
According to the programming staff, planning for each year's SuperJam began in "Jam-Uary" (January). Brian Douglas states that inspiration for the creation of the SuperJam concept arose from two sources... exposure to annual summer concerts put together by a radio station in his native Florida during his youth (WAPE, Jacksonville's Big Ape Conventions and Big Ape Shower of Stars) and 102 JAMZ' experiment with a modified summer concert in 1996. This outdoor event, billed as Busta Brown Bingo, was presented as part of a contest in which featured afternoon personality Busta Brown, skydived onto a random block in a squared-off area to award a station contestant $10,000. As an incentive for others to attend, the station assembled acts to perform, including Junior M.A.F.I.A. with Lil' Kim, 112, Bahamadia and Nonchalant. Attendance was strong and listeners responded positively to the concept, setting the stage for the original SuperJam one year later.

== Annual SuperJam Lineups ==
=== SuperJam (1997) ===
Bone Thugs-n-Harmony, Lil' Kim, SWV, OutKast, Freak Nasty, Steve Martin, Junior M.A.F.I.A. and Lost Boyz

=== SuperJam II (1998) ===
LL Cool J, Big Pun, Dru Hill, Goodie Mob, Cam'ron, Total, Charlie Baltimore and Sylk-E. Fyne

=== SuperJam III (1999) ===
Busta Rhymes, Slick Rick, Doug E. Fresh, Trina, 112, Trick Daddy, JT Money, Rare Essence, Sporty Thievz and Jermaine Dupri

=== SuperJam 2000 ===
Jay-Z, Jagged Edge, Da Brat, Donell Jones, Bow Wow, and Jermaine Dupri

=== SuperJam V (2001) ===
Ludacris, Ja Rule, Bow Wow, Petey Pablo, DJ Kool, Redman, Philly's Most Wanted, Sunshine Anderson and Tank

=== SuperJam VI (2002) ===
P Diddy and the Family, Ashanti, Ja Rule, Fat Joe, Mr. Cheeks, N.O.R.E., Nappy Roots, Charlie Baltimore and Vida

=== SuperJam VII (2003) ===
Lil’ Jon and the Eastside Boyz, Nas, Lil' Kim, Bone Crusher and Wayne Wonder

=== SuperJam VIII (2004) ===
Ying Yang Twins, Chingy, Petey Pablo, J-Kwon, Trillville, Elephant Man and Crime Family

=== SuperJam IX (2005) ===
T. I., Ying Yang Twins, Trillville, Boyz n da Hood and Young Jeezy

=== SuperJam X (2006) ===
SuperJam X took place Friday night, June 30, 2006, featuring T. I., Three 6 Mafia, Dem Franchize Boyz, Remy Ma, T-Pain, Yung Joc and Paul Wall. Celebrating 102 JAMZ' tenth anniversary, $10,000 was given away to a single winner. On stage activity included air personality/audience interaction, Mix Squad sets and the 102 JAMZ Dancers.

=== SuperJam (2007) ===
The 11th annual show took place Friday night, June 29, 2007, with Young Jeezy, Yung Joc, Crime Mob, Ricky Ruckus, Lloyd, DJ Unk, M.I.M.S., Rich Boy, and Omarion. A set of rims, cash and SuperJam shirts were given away, with talent/audience interplay, the 102 JAMZ Mix Squad and the JAMZ Dancers bridging short gaps between the acts.

=== SuperJam (2008) ===
Tickets went on sale Friday, May 16, 2008, for the June 27th show. May 31, Plies visited 102 JAMZ, announcing that he would be headlining and that The-Dream would also star at the show. He promised more to come. On subsequent Mondays, 102 JAMZ teased the announcement of additional acts to be named on the following Fridays, with advance announcements sent by email to 102 JAMZ Hard Hittaz (102JAMZ.com club members). The announced lineup featured Plies, The-Dream, Shawty Lo, Sheek Louch, Ray J, Flo Rida and 2 Pistols. Live at SuperJam, 102 JAMZ' Waleed Coyote introduced a surprise guest, Three 6 Mafia.

=== SuperJam (2009) ===
The ticket on sale took place Friday, May 15, 2009, with a Friday, June 19 show date. 102 JAMZ sent emails to 102 JAMZ Hard Hittaz listing scheduled acts, with on-air announcements on the following days. The complete 2009 lineup featured Young Jeezy, Gucci Mane, Rick Ross, Soulja Boy Tell 'Em, Fast Life Yungstaz (F. L. Y.), Yung L.A. and Lil' Ru. In addition, special surprise guests Fabolous and Ricco Barrino joined the show. SuperJam 2009 sold out the weekend before the show, with audience speculation over possible issues between Jeezy and Gucci a topic of discussion.

=== SuperJam (2010) ===
On-sale date for SuperJam (#14) was Friday, May 21. Show date was Friday, June 25. On Memorial Day (Monday, May 31), a "Breaking News" email announced "legendary emcee, movie star and Hip Hop entrepreneur with a million hit records from the year 2000 to now", Ludacris, plus Waka Flocka Flame and B.o.B. On-air confirmation followed on Tuesday morning, June 1 at 7:25 AM. Six days later, a second email announced Plies, Roscoe Dash and Party Boyz. This information was broadcast on-air, Monday morning, June 7. The 2010 lineup included Ludacris, Plies, Waka Flocka Flame, Roscoe Dash, B.o.B., Party Boyz, Sean Garrett, Cali Swag District, plus a previously unannounced "last minute surprise", Travis Porter.

=== SuperJam (2011) ===
Vague mentions of SuperJam began to be heard the week of May 2. The on-sale date was announced as Friday, May 13. May 23, Waka Flocka Flame was announced as a "SuperJam headliner", with the news leaked earlier to the station Hard Hittaz on Facebook and Twitter. A week later, both Travis Porter and Young Jeezy were confirmed, with similar advance notice given. On June 6, the remaining acts were announced. Friday night, June 17, at 7:30 PM, the SuperJam lineup featured, in order, Big Sean, YC (Yung Chris), Jeremih, Ace Hood, Lloyd, Travis Porter, Waka Flocka Flame and Young Jeezy. Two Mix Squad Battles (DJ Polo/DJ MC and DJ Deluxe/J-Flex) were featured between acts, as well.

=== SuperJam (2012) ===
102 JAMZ gave away the first SuperJam tickets in March for NCAA Tournament "Ball Bustin’ Brackets" predictions. In April, tickets to various area concerts “set up SuperJam season.” May 4, 102 JAMZ teased an upcoming announcement to occur one week later. Rick Ross, 2 Chainz, J. Cole, Wale, DJ Drama and Ca$h Out were named, with tickets to go on sale May 18. Social media leaks preceded each on-air announcement.

Ticket giveaways began earlier than usual, with listeners responding to Rick Ross’ on-air "Mic Checks" in late May. Next, the audience was encouraged to listen for a series of "Super Songs" in order to win VIP tickets in the first 5 rows, including a number of front row tickets. In June, the station began giving away pairs of tickets every hour. The week of the show, VIP tickets were given away daily, on Fifth Row Monday, Fourth Row Tuesday, etc.

The morning of the show, Friday, June 29, a record company executive called to inform the station that 2 Chainz’s father was in the hospital in critical condition and expected to pass away. Thus, 2 Chainz would not be performing at Super Jam. The radio station brought two giant sympathy cards for 2 Chainz and his family to the Greensboro Coliseum lobby, which were signed by hundreds of attendees before the show. 102 JAMZ did an on-stage tribute during the show, asking for a moment of silence in his honor. A few days later, 2 Chainz’ father died, with his son at his side. He subsequently called the station, offered his apologies for missing the show and spoke movingly about the love and support he was shown by his fans in North Carolina. Along with Rick Ross, J. Cole, Wale, DJ Drama, and Ca$h Out, SuperJam 2012 featured special mixes by J-Flex, DJ Ern's Twerk Mix and a series of on-stage contests.

=== SuperJam (2013) ===
In late March, 102 JAMZ began slipping in occasional mentions of SuperJam. The station's "Bracket Boss" won the first pair of tickets for best NCAA Tournament prediction. Preceded by leaks on Twitter, Facebook and 102JAMZ.com, 102 JAMZ announced the lineup on May 3... Future, 2 Chainz, Wale, A$AP Rocky, and Ace Hood, with an on-sale date of Friday, May 10. Promotional announcements mentioned "Starship SuperJam" with references to outer space and Future.

Back-to-back contesting ran from mid-May through the day of the show, with tickets given away as listeners were put on "Astronaut Status", Text-to-Win contesting for floor seats and "Super Songs" tied into tickets in the first five rows, including four pair in the Front Row. For almost two weeks, the station gave away pairs of tickets every hour, day and night, followed by several days of "V.I.P. Platform Seats" contesting every hour, then tickets in each of the first five rows. SuperJam Tickets and V.I.P. Platform Seats were given away on the streets, as well. DJ Lil Vegas and "Do It All" Willis created SuperJam 2013: The Mixtape.

Friday night, June 21 at 7:30, French Montana appeared as a surprise last minute replacement for A$AP Rocky.

=== SuperJam (2014) ===
May 9, promotional announcements aired introducing SuperJam as "like Christmas in June." The lineup was announced as Yo Gotti, Rick Ross, Young Thug, K Camp, Kid Ink and YG. The date of the show was announced as June 27 and referred to, variously, as SuperJam, SuperJam 2014 and #SJ14. The on-sale date was announced as Friday, May 16, with SuperJam Hard Hitta club members offered the opportunity to purchase tickets 24 hours early with a "Secret Code."

A text contest gave station listeners the chance to win Front Row Seats. "Super Songs for Platinum Seats" offered opportunities to win Floor Seats near the stage. Tickets Every Hour were given away 24/7 for two weeks, followed by "V-I-Platform Seats Every Hour"... with winners given exclusive, not-for-sale passes to join a select group on risers at the back of the floor seating area, with tables, stools and bar service. The week of the show, sets of tickets were given away daily in each of the first five rows, building to Front Row Friday.

The 18th annual SuperJam was streamed live with contesting, special Mix Squad sets and entertainment filling any downtime between acts.

=== 2015 ===
On Thursday morning, May 14, at 7:45, B-Daht of 102 JAMZ' 3 Live Crew morning show announced "some bad news"... that there would be no SuperJam in 2015. Sounding heartfelt, he said this was the worst day of his career, then reminisced about growing up in Greensboro and attending SuperJam concerts each year. He mentioned seeing Diddy and Lil' Kim, being impressed with Busta Rhymes and, as part of the on-air staff, the excitement of being at the show where "Gucci Mane and Jeezy were beefing and we had both of them in the same building at the same time."

He spoke of the difficulty of putting together a great show each year from the few acts the listeners might like to see, how some are touring or in the studio, other have prior commitments, etc. He talked about feeling that 102 JAMZ had a great show planned for 2015, then having two major acts tell the station they were not available within a few days. He spoke of how the staff had "tried everything we could to put this thing together."

Simultaneously, the station issued a statement on 102JAMZ.com, on Facebook, and through Instagram. Under the header SuperJam Cancellation Announcement, the following was posted: 102 JAMZ regrets to announce the cancellation of this year's SuperJam. Over the years, the goal has always been to put together a strong show at a low ticket price. That has become increasingly difficult, and this year, impossible. We can't tell you how sorry we are to have to share this news with you and how much we appreciate the support you've shown SuperJam over the years.
