= WPAW =

- Winston-Salem, North Carolina; United States
- Broadcast area: Piedmont Triad
- Frequency: 93.1 MHz (HD Radio)
- Branding: 93.1 The Wolf

Programming
- Language: English
- Format: Country music

Ownership
- Owner: Audacy, Inc.; (Audacy License, LLC)
- Sister stations: WJMH; WQMG; WSMW

History
- First air date: 1947
- Former call signs: WAIR-FM (1947–1979); WSEZ (1979–87); WMQX-FM (1987–2006)
- Call sign meaning: "Wolf's paw"

Technical information
- Licensing authority: FCC
- Facility ID: 40752
- Class: C
- ERP: 100,000 watts
- HAAT: 335 meters (1,099 ft)
- Transmitter coordinates: 36°16′33.5″N 79°56′25.1″W

Links
- Public license information: Public file; LMS
- Webcast: Listen live (via Audacy)
- Website: www.audacy.com/931wolfcountry

WPAW (93.1 FM "93.1 the Wolf") is a country music radio station licensed to Winston-Salem, North Carolina, and serving the Piedmont Triad region, which includes Greensboro and High Point. The Audacy, Inc. with an ERP of 100 kW. The station's studios are located near the Piedmont Triad International Airport, and a transmitter site is near Stokesdale, North Carolina.

== History ==
The station's original calls were WAIR-FM (sister station and simulcast partner to WAIR). The station signed on August 24, 1947 and the first program was a First Baptist Church service. By 1966 WAIR-FM had "adult, middle-of-the-road music" with strings and show tunes. At one time the station was known as "Fresh Air 93". In the late-1960s the station had religious during the day and beautiful music at night, with the call letters WGPL.

In 1979, the station returned to a partial simulcast of a Top-40 format with WAIR, but the 93.1 station took on the calls WSEZ and the combination was collectively known as Z-93.

In the 1980s WSEZ completely separated from WAIR, playing Top 40 and later album-oriented rock. In 1985, one-fourth of WAIR programming was a simulcast of WSEZ. Rock music on WSEZ did not last after the debut of Rock 92 On March 6, 1987, the station became WMQX "93-Mix", an adult contemporary station playing hits of the 1960s, 1970s and 1980s with "less talk, more variety". The WMQX letters stayed during the station's entire tenure as an oldies station, which began in 1990. The format change, along with a name change to Oldies 93-Point-Fun, boosted the station's popularity. Later the name changed to simply, Oldies 93.

In 1997, Kris Abrams became program director of the station & billed it as "The Triad's '60s Specialists". The station's slogan became "All Oldies, All The Time". Features on the station were "Waking Up with Jack Armstrong, "The All-request Lunch", and "The Top 5 at 5". DJs on the Station at this time were Armstrong, Abrams, Dave Solomon, Gary Ross and Max McGann.

In January 1999, Abrams left for Milwaukee to program Oldies 95.7 WZTR (now WRIT-FM) and Solomon became program director. The music started to change, leaning to more 1970s music. The station's slogan then became "Good Times & Great Oldies". A year later Solomon left to program Oldies 100.7 WTRG in Raleigh. Randle C. Bliss came in as program director about 4 months later in 2000. The station's slogan changed one last time to "Rock 'N Roll Favorites". Later Armstrong left and Max Mcgann returned to do mornings. News Director, Ed Snow was gone and the traffic reporters, Lane Closure & Rhoda Block were removed as well.

On October 3, 2006, the station began stunting with a "Wheel of Formats". The following day, WMQX flipped to country as "93.1 The Wolf". The move gave the region three country outlets taking on rival WTQR and market fringe country stations WBRF and WAKG. As of the week ending November 25, 2006, WMQX officially changed its call letters to WPAW.

== HD Radio ==
In January 2007 WPAW signed on a hybrid analog/digital transmitter, allowing the radio station to transmit an HD2 signal, with an expanded, commercial-free version of then off-air Oldies 93 format. The Oldies 93HD runs an expanded playlist with no jocks. Listeners in the Triad can listen to Oldies 93 HD if they purchase an HD Radio. The Oldies 93 HD plays more 1970s and 1980s music. The HD2 subchannel was eventually turned off.
