= The Pickle Brothers =

Comedy trio

The Pickle Brothers were a three-man comedy act which enjoyed considerable success during the late 1960s. Their madcap style, characterized by fast patter and constant motion, encompassed sketch comedy, spoofs of then-current television shows and commercials, and social and political humor.

Ron Prince, Michael Mislove, and Peter Lee met and first performed together while theatre arts majors at Hofstra University, on Long Island, New York. Originally their act was a foursome calling themselves The Uncalled Four. The fourth was the young Madeline Kahn, who went on to success as a solo comedian. The remaining trio rechristened themselves The Uncalled For Three. They worked alongside Francis Ford Coppola and Lainie Kazan. Following college, they played extensively at nightclubs and coffeehouses in the New York City area, including Bud Friedman's Improvisation.

They were soon placed under contract by Fred Weintraub, owner of The Bitter End in New York City's Greenwich Village. The Uncalled For Three made their debut at the Bitter End on May 26, 1965, appearing on the same bill with such performers as Van Morrison, Richie Havens, and the Chapins. Variety caught their 25-minute act in September 1967: "The Uncalled For Three revive a type of comedy that was popular during the speakeasy era. They bring on visions of the Yacht Club Boys and others of that epoch who worked with rapid-fire gags, slapstick, and other ancient devices. There are several plus spots. They seem to have the knack of working together and getting the most out of the hackneyed lines. There are some original touches, but the bulk of their turn is devoted to lines that people still remember from a former era." Columnist Chuck Thurston of the Detroit Free Press commented on the trio's zany approach: "The comedy side of the (Dionne Warwick) show is conducted by three energetic young men in baggy suits who wear whistles around their necks and make faces and fall down a lot."

Nevertheless, the act's emphasis on broad, hard-sell, nutty humor -- seldom seen since the heyday of The Ritz Brothers in the 1930s -- was well received by audiences. The trio performed in concert at many colleges as well as at major nightclubs including The Cellar Door in Washington, D.C., and The Troubador in Los Angeles.

== Tours and television ==
The Uncalled For Three were the opening act on three tours with The Beach Boys. They appeared on such major network TV shows as The Tonight Show Starring Johnny Carson and The Ed Sullivan Show.

By early 1966, plans were in the works for The Uncalled For Three to star in their own situation-comedy TV series. The first to propose a production deal was comedian Don Rickles; then the project was taken over by Bob Precht of Ed Sullivan Productions for broadcast by ABC-TV. The pilot, titled The Pickle Brothers, cast The Uncalled For Three in the title roles as three free-wheeling brothers accepting any job for hire. The half-hour pilot was filmed in color at MGM. It was written by Gerald Gardner and Dee Caruso of The Monkees TV series, and directed by William Friedkin, later known for The French Connection and The Exorcist. The Uncalled For Three, pinning their hopes on the pilot, officially changed the name of their act to The Pickle Brothers. The pilot did not sell and further series plans were dropped, but the trio kept going as The Pickle Brothers.

== Split ==
The Pickle Brothers disbanded in 1968, primarily over creative differences. Ron Prince joined the cast of the Laugh-In-inspired series, What's It All About, World? which ran 13 weeks during the spring of 1969.

Each former member of The Pickle Brothers continues to pursue creative and artistic interests.

The 1966 script for the Pickle Brothers TV pilot was retained by writers Gardner and Caruso. They pitched it to Screen Gems, which recast it and refilmed it in 1972. The new version, Help, Inc., featured Avery Schreiber, Ken Gilman, and Anthony Holland in the Pickle Brothers' roles as the three hired-for-anything brothers. The scripts were identical except for the character names. Again, the pilot did not sell.
