= Rod Adkins =

American businessperson (born 1958)

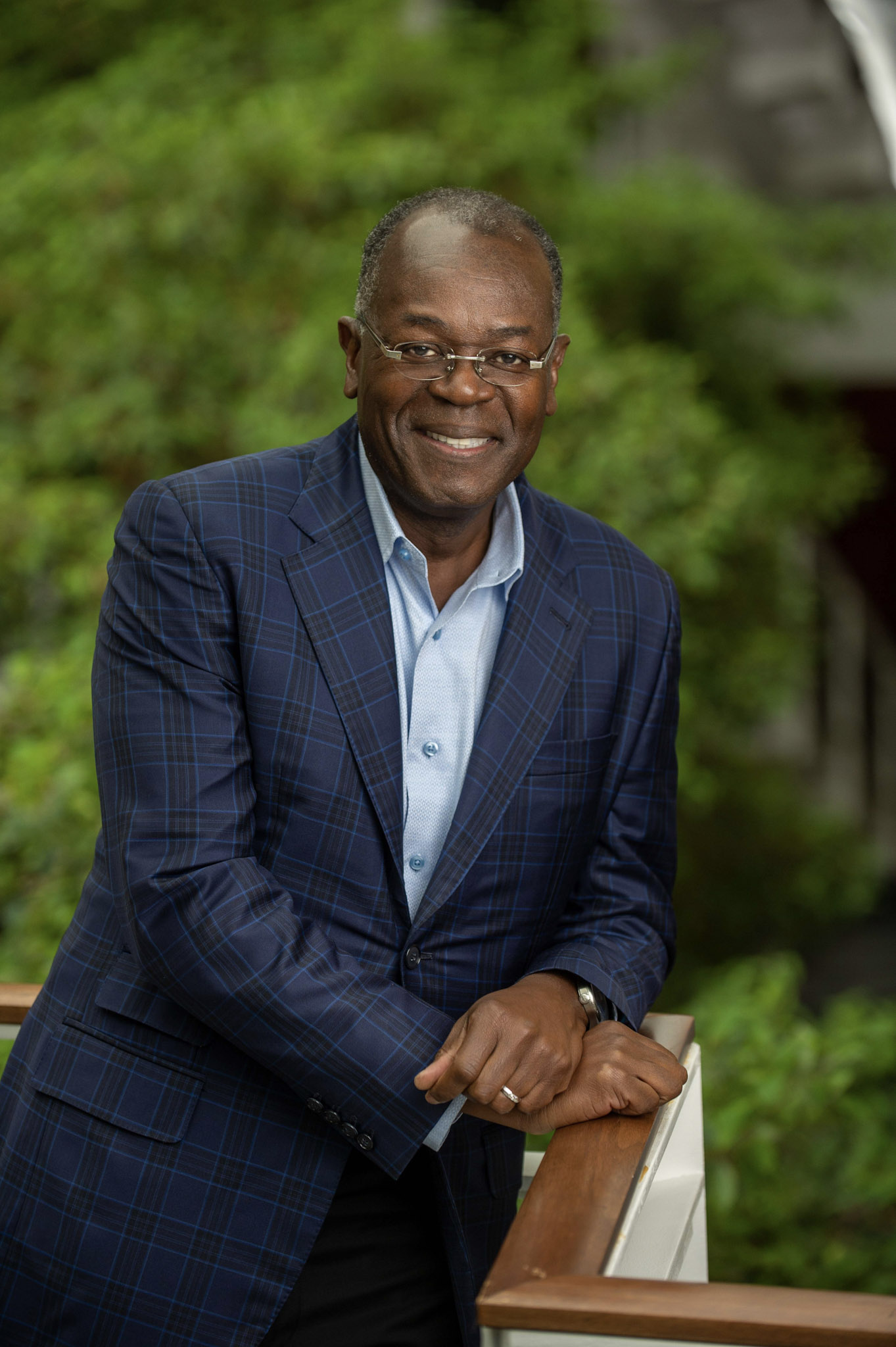
- Born: August 23, 1958 (age 68); Miami, FL
- Education: Georgia Institute of Technology (Georgia Tech) Rollins College Georgia Institute of Technology (Georgia Tech)
- Spouse: Michelle Collier Adkins
- Parent(s): Archie and Wauneta Adkins
- Website: https://www.rodneyadkins.com and https://www.3ramgroup.com

Rodney C. "Rod" Adkins (born August 23, 1958) is an electrical engineer, philanthropist and American business executive. He was a leader in solutions ranging from mobile devices to the world's largest supercomputers at International Business Machines (IBM). He currently holds the position of Chairman of the Board of Directors at Avnet. Adkins also serves on the board of directors of United Parcel Service (UPS) and W. W. Grainger.

His career includes extensive experience in emerging technologies, global business operations, product development, brand management and supply chain. Throughout his career, he has held several leadership positions, including Senior Vice President of IBM from 2007 to 2014, the company's first African American to hold the post.

== Early life and education ==
Adkins was born in Augusta, Georgia, on August 23, 1958, and grew up in Miami, Florida. His parents are Archie and Wauneta Adkins. After graduating valedictorian from Miami Jackson High School, he attended Rollins College in 1976 as a dual degree student with Georgia Institute of Technology (Georgia Tech) and graduated with a Bachelor of Science in electrical engineering from Georgia Tech in 1981 and a Bachelor of Arts degree in physics from Rollins College in 1982.

In 1983, he earned a Master of Science degree in electrical engineering from Georgia Tech.

== Career ==
Adkins began working at IBM in 1981. In 2007 he was appointed to the position of IBM Corporate Officer and Senior Vice President, the first African American to hold this position.

During his 33-year tenure at IBM, Adkins held various strategic, operational and management positions. His major contributions include advancing the Personal Computer industry through the launch of the IBM ThinkPad; leading IBM's POWER business to become the market leader in the UNIX market; and helping to pioneer what became IBM's portfolio of Internet of Things (IoT) solutions. His career highlights include leading IBM's global strategy; overseeing IBM's global supply chain including global procurement, manufacturing and customer fulfillment; leading IBM's complete portfolio of hardware systems including microelectronics, mainframe/System z, RS6000/Power Systems, AS400/System i, x-Series/System x and Enterprise Storage; leading IBM’s Pervasive Computing portfolio of “Smarter Planet” IoT software solutions; leading IBM's RS6000/Power Systems including the introduction of the industry's first multi-core system based on POWER 4 microprocessor; leading IBM's complete portfolio of desktop Personal Computers; leading global operations and technical support for the launch of IBM ThinkPad 750, IBM ThinkPad 500 and IBM PS/2 Portable (“luggable”); and delivering a full range of IBM's PS/2 desktop and server systems, including the introduction of the first processor upgradeable system; and providing test engineering support and certification for component technologies used in the IBM PC, PCjr, PC XT and PC AT.. Adkins current position is president of 3RAM Group LLC, a private company that does capital investments, business consulting, and property management.

Adkins has also been an active philanthropist throughout his career including Founding Donor of the Smithsonian National Museum of African American History and Culture (NMAAHC) and donor of the Rosa Parks sculpture titled “Continuing the Conversation,” which is prominently located at Georgia Tech. Adkins has been an advocate for increasing the number of professionals in the fields of science, technology, engineering, and mathematics (STEM). This includes a focus on minorities with the establishment of endowed, merit-based and need-based scholarships at Georgia Tech, Rollins College, UMBC and the Kappa Alpha Psi Foundation. He has published works, including "America Desperately Needs More STEM Students" in Forbes, emphasizing minority participation in STEM. In addition, the “Rodney C. Adkins Legacy Award for Business Transformation” is presented annually in recognition of a deserving industry leader for their consistent impact and contributions in the STEM fields.

Adkins serves on the board of directors of United Parcel Service (UPS), W. W. Grainger, and as Chairman of the Board of Directors at Avnet. He is a member of the Executive Leadership Council and is a trustee of Georgia Tech and Rollins College.

He previously served on the boards of Pitney Bowes, PeopleClick Inc., PPL Corporation, the National Action Council for Minorities in Engineering (NACME), the Kappa Alpha Psi Foundation, the Harlem School of the Arts and the Smithsonian National Board.

== Honors ==
Adkins is a lifetime member of the National Society of Black Engineers and in 2001 was awarded its Golden Torch Award for Lifetime Achievement in Industry.

In 1996, US Black Engineer & Information Technology magazine awarded Adkins as Black Engineer of the Year for Professional Achievement in Industry

In 2002, Fortune magazine named Adkins one of the 50 Most Powerful Black Executives in America.

In 2005, Adkins was inducted into the National Academy of Engineering.

In 2007, Adkins was awarded the title of Black Engineer of the Year by US Black Engineer & Information Technology magazine.

Black Enterprise magazine recognized Mr. Adkins as its 2011 Corporate Executive of the Year.

In 2011, he received an honorary Doctor of Science degree from the University of Maryland Baltimore County (UMBC),

In 2013, Adkins was granted an honorary Doctor of Philosophy degree from Georgia Tech.

Black Enterprise magazine recognized Mr. Adkins as its 2016 Trailblazer of the Year.

In 2017, Kappa Alpha Psi presented Adkins with the Laurel Wreath, the highest award presented to a member who demonstrates global and national groundbreaking achievements that have shaped the world.

In 2018, Adkins was inducted into the Miami Jackson High School Hall of Fame.

In 2022, Adkins was inducted into the Miami-Dade County Public Schools Alumni Hall of Fame.

In 2024, Adkins was inducted into the Georgia Tech College of Engineering Hall of Fame.

His life journey has been recorded by The HistoryMakers.

He has been featured in CBS 60 Minutes TV Special: The History Makers 2023.

As of February 2025, he has been a part of the Avnet Board of Directors for a decade.
