= Charles Avnet =

American businessman (1888–1979)

- Born: 1888; Russia
- Died: 1979 (aged 90–91)
- Known for: Founder of Avnet
- Spouse: Celia Avnet
- Children: 4
- Relatives: Jon Avnet (grandson)

Charles Avnet (1888–1979) was an American businessman who founded electronics parts distributor Avnet.

== Biography ==
Avnet was born to a Jewish family in 1888 in Russia.

In 1921, Avnet began buying surplus ham radio parts and selling them to the public on Radio Row in the lower Manhattan capitalizing on the end of the World War I era ban on the trade of radio parts in 1918. He had $85,000 in sales in his first year. With the advent of commercial radio broadcasting and factory-made radios (which did not require parts), he adjusted his distribution pipeline and began selling parts to manufacturers and dealers. In 1929, he diversified by branching out into car antenna kits and automobile assembly kits. During the Great Depression, he shifted the focus from retailing to wholesaling. During World War II, sales to the private sector were banned, so Avnet shifted to government sales with an emphasis on connectors. After the war, the market was flooded with war surplus components and Avnet flourished incorporating as Avnet Electronics Supply Co Inc in 1955 reaching $1 million in sales. In 1959, the company went public as Avnet Electronics Corporation.

== Personal life ==
He was married to Celia Avnet. They had four children: Lester Francis Avnet (1913–1970), Robert H. Avnet (1919–1964), Lillian Avnet Marks, and Dr. Norman Avnet (1928–2017). He died in 1979; services were held at Congregation Beth Sholom in Long Beach, New York. His grandson (son of Lester) is director, writer and producer Jon Avnet.
