= WJMH =

- Reidsville, North Carolina; United States
- Broadcast area: Piedmont Triad
- Frequency: 102.1 MHz (HD Radio)
- Branding: 102 JAMZ

Programming
- Format: Urban contemporary
- Subchannels: HD2: Channel Q

Ownership
- Owner: Audacy, Inc.; (Audacy License, LLC)
- Sister stations: WPAW; WQMG; WSMW

History
- First air date: 1947
- Former call signs: WREV-FM (1947–66); WWMO (1966–87); WBIG (1987–89)
- Call sign meaning: Approximation of JAMZ

Technical information
- Licensing authority: FCC
- Facility ID: 40754
- Class: C0
- ERP: 100,000 watts
- HAAT: 367 meters (1,204 ft)
- Transmitter coordinates: 36°16′33″N 79°56′25″W

Links
- Public license information: Public file; LMS
- Webcast: Listen live (via Audacy)
- Website: www.audacy.com/102jamz

WJMH (102.1 FM "102 JAMZ") is an urban contemporary radio station licensed to Reidsville, North Carolina, and serving the Piedmont Triad, including Greensboro, Winston-Salem and High Point. It is owned by Audacy, Inc., with studios near the Piedmont Triad International Airport, on National Service Road in Greensboro.

WJMH has an effective radiated power (ERP) of 100,000 watts, the maximum for most FM stations. The transmitter site is off Sylvania Road near North Carolina Highway 68 in Stokesdale. WJMH broadcasts using HD Radio technology. Its HD2 subchannel carries Audacy's LGBTQ service "Channel Q."

== Former 102 JAMZ personalities ==
Personalities over the years have included Shilynne Cole, now Program Director and mid-day host for 97.1 QMG (WQMG); Busta Brown, who spent several years with area television station WXII-TV and now hosts afternoon on 97.1 QMG; Madd Hatta, morning host at Houston's 97.9 The Boxx (KBXX); Kyle Santillian, host of "The Chicago Morning Takeover!" on WGCI-FM/107.5; Skip Dillard, Operations Manager/Program Director of New York's WBLS/107.5; Afrika Perry, afternoon talent at Miami's Power 96 (WPOW); Boogie D, former Operations Manager of St. Louis' Hot 104.1 (WHHL), and Old School 95.5 (WFUN-FM), St. Louis; Mary K, Program Director of Charlotte's 92.7 The Block, Old School 105.3 and Praise 100.9; Kendall B, morning co-host at Denver's KS 107.5 (KQKS); The Bushman, middays at Detroit's FM 98 (WJLB); Big Tap Money, Program Director of Fayetteville's Foxy 99 (WZFX); Baby J, Program Director at (WCHZ-FM) Hot 95.5/93.1, Augusta, Georgia; Waleed Coyote, Executive at EMPIRE, founder and CEO of Othaz Records and President of Slip N Slide DJs; Geronimo and Cool Breeze (Reggae Jamz). Larry Diesbach aKa "Red Neck Stuby" bought the Domain 102Jamz.com without this purchase the FL 102Jamz would have got it 1st

Several personalities ascribe their success to their work with Brian Douglas of 102 JAMZ. Terrence J was a former co-anchor of E! News and former host of BET's 106 & Park. George "Apollo" Fetherbay, owner of radio commercial production house Apollo Productions, and The Jammer, owner of Larry Davis Voiceover were both broadcast "voice-over" talents. Traci LaTrelle was air talent at WHUR-FM, Washington, D.C.. Sammy Mack was a former New York air personality and Big Lip Bandit was a morning host at Power 96 in Miami.

The late Tre Black, known as Tre Bien while with 102 JAMZ, went on to great success in New York City, Los Angeles and Detroit before his untimely death in March, 2010. Other alumni, not active in radio at this time, include Dr. Michael Lynn; Delyte; Hannah's Baby Boy Stu; Mario Devoe; Mic Foxx; and former morning show co-hosts Tanya Simmons Reid (last name formerly "James") and Amos Quick. Quick is now a Guilford County school board member, and pastor of Calvary Baptist Church in High Point.

== 102 JAMZ' SuperJam ==
Between 1997 and 2014, 102 JAMZ' annual summer concert happened each year in late June, featuring primarily hip hop artists. The station's debut summer show, SuperJam I, took place Friday night, June 20, 1997, at Greensboro Coliseum with an audience of 20,000 and featured Bone Thugs-n-Harmony, Junior M.A.F.I.A., Lil' Kim, OutKast, Lost Boyz, SWV, Freak Nasty and others. Successive annual SuperJams have included artists such as Jay-Z, Ludacris, Diddy, Young Jeezy, T-Pain, Rick Ross, Busta Rhymes, T.I., Ja Rule, Three 6 Mafia, J. Cole, LL Cool J, Fat Joe, Petey Pablo, Slick Rick and Doug E. Fresh, Lil Jon & the East Side Boyz, Nas, Wale, Cam'Ron, Trina, Big Pun, Lloyd, Redman, Omarion, Ying Yang Twins, 112, Trick Daddy, Da Brat, Dem Franchize Boyz, Dru Hill, N.O.R.E., Bow Wow, Ashanti, Elephant Man, Jermaine Dupri, DJ Kool, Chingy and Jagged Edge. SuperJam and the 102 JAMZ Birthday Bash, held each Jam-Uary, were hosted by the 102 JAMZ airstaff, with music provided by the 102 JAMZ Mix Squad.

== Early history of 102.1 (1947–1988) ==
The radio station now known as 102 JAMZ was originally located in Reidsville, North Carolina, a simulcast of sister station WREV (1220 AM). In 1947, William Manton Oliver Sr., at that time owner of the local newspaper (The Reidsville Review), applied to the FCC for a permit to construct an FM radio station under the AM's corporate name, Reidsville Broadcasting Company, Inc. After operating for a time under a Construction Permit, the station's license was granted September 6, 1948. At that time, FM was still new and somewhat experimental. Almost all radio listening was shared among AM radio stations. Mr. Oliver's primary purpose for constructing the station was a desire to provide high school football coverage to Reidsville listeners, as WREV (AM) was not allowed to remain on the air after sunset. For almost twenty years, the same programming was carried on both WREV and WREV-FM. The WREV simulcast ended in 1966, when Oliver's son, William Manton Oliver Jr. began to handle day-to-day operations. WREV-FM became a Christian radio station and assumed the new call letters, WWMO. On September 10, 1977, by chance the day of William Manton Oliver Sr.'s funeral, WREV-FM was sold to new owner George Beasley, a former high school principal.

On November 12, 1980, WWMO completed a 729-foot tower near Browns Summit, giving the station better coverage of Greensboro.

Late in 1986, Beasley began construction of a new tall tower, near the Guilford/Rockingham county line and moved the facility to new studios in Greensboro, NC. Upon completion of construction, with a new, much stronger signal in place, the former Reidsville-only station first actively attempted to reach the Greensboro-Winston-Salem-High Point metropolitan area. The new "BIG 102" took the WBIG call letters, recently abandoned by Greensboro's oldest radio station, (an AM facility that "went dark" [voluntarily turning in its broadcasting license to the FCC and leaving the air permanently]), hired some of WBIG (AM)'s personalities and debuted as a country music station, late in March, 1987. BIG 102's debut was preceded by a computerized countdown created by Dan Robins, who in 1994 was corporate product manager of Smart Computers and Software in Fayetteville, North Carolina.

WBIG's initial Arbitron ratings were fairly strong, but settled back over time. Through the four ratings "books" in 1988, the station's 12+ "shares" (a measure of the percentage of listeners aged 12 and older), were 4.9, 5.0, 4.4 and 3.8. Through that same year, competitor WTQR achieved shares of 18.6, 17.5, 18.1 and 16.8..

== Background as 102 JAMZ ==
On December 29, 1988, the station abandoned the country battle, flipping the format to "Churban" and changing the station's call letters and name. WJMH "102 JAMZ" was consulted by Jerry Clifton, who specialized in multi-ethnic programming (in Miami, Detroit, Orlando, Dallas, Philadelphia and other markets). Under original Program Director Chris Bailey, 102 JAMZ showed a 12+ Arbitron share of 7.7 in their first ratings book, as compared to rival Power 97's 4.1.

Under Bailey, and 102 JAMZ' second PD Brian Douglas, 102 JAMZ continued to outrank Power 97 in the 12+ ratings, especially with Men and Women aged 18 to 34 and with teenaged listeners (Douglas joined 102 JAMZ in September, 1990 and remains Program Director at the present time). 102 JAMZ and Power 97 continued to compete head-on until September, 1996. At that time, new owner Max Media moved WQMG in a much more adult direction, as Black-targeted Urban Adult Contemporary 97.1 QMG and 102 JAMZ began working with Steve Smith Radio and Ratings Consultants (Smith had guided Hot 97 WQHT New York's transition from dance to a more Hip Hop and R&B mix as Hot 97's Program Director in 1993 and 1994).

From its inception, 102 JAMZ featured a strong percentage of Rap and, by 1992, was perhaps the first radio station to be targeted exclusively toward 18- to 24-year-old African Americans. "Urban", or Black-targeted stations of the time, typically attempted to reach a broader demographic, concentrating focus on the lucrative 25- to 54-year-old market. Rap music was typically relegated to weekend mix shows, limited to airplay during the evenings only or, in many cases, not played at all.

The station achieved success with younger listeners across the spectrum (White, Hispanic, etc.), building on music for college-aged listeners, foreground "personalities", regular hip hop-oriented Mix Shows, interactive cash contests and activity "on the streets". Breaking lifestyle news and events in hip hop music played a key role on the station from the early days, as well.

102 JAMZ reports weekly playlist information to Mediabase as a Rhythmic CHR and to BDS as an R&B/Hip-Hop reporter. For ratings purposes, Nielsen Audio has WJMH listed as a Rhythmic in its monthly PPM books. The station's playlist is mostly focused on the Hip-Hop/Rap genre, leaving some current R&B to Urban AC sister WQMG.

On June 4, 2020, WJMH's 3 Live Crew teamed up with WKZL's Jared and Katie to discuss the continuing conflict involving police brutality against minorities, protests, and systematic racism that has spilled over into the Greensboro-High Point-Winston-Salem Metropolitan area that began with the George Floyd protests.

== Ownership history ==
The station which is now WJMH has been operated by five different owners through the years. Reidsville Broadcasting Company, Inc., founded the station in 1947. In 1977, the company which became Beasley Broadcasting took ownership, followed by Max Media in 1996, Sinclair Broadcasting in 1998 and, from late 1999 to the present, Entercom Communications Corp. (renamed Audacy, Inc. in 2021).
