= Premier Farnell =

High-service electronics components distributor

Premier Farnell Ltd.
- Type: Subsidiary
- Industry: Electronics
- Founded: 1939; 87 years ago
- Founder: Alan Farnell
- Headquarters: Leeds, Yorkshire, UK
- Key people: Rebeca Obregon (president)
- Parent: Avnet
- Website: www.farnell.com

Premier Farnell Ltd. is a distributor of products for electronic system design, maintenance and repair throughout Europe, North America and Asia Pacific, with operations in 36 countries and trading in over 100. In October 2016, the firm was purchased by Avnet in a deal valued at approximately £691 million.

== History ==
The firm was founded by Alan Farnell and Arthur Woffenden in 1939 in Leeds, England as A.C. Farnell Limited. It was first listed on the London Stock Exchange in 1966. The company was based next to Wetherby railway station, later moving into larger offices on the town's Sandbeck Industrial Estate, and in 1995, into offices in Armley.

In 1995 it acquired Combined Precision Components. As it focused on distribution, its manufacturing operations were sold the same year. In 1996 it bought the United States distributor, Premier Industrial Corporation, and changed its name to Premier Farnell.

In 2001 the firm acquired Buck & Hickman, a company which it sold in 2007. In 2006, the firm sold Kent, its specialist automotive consumables business.

In the mid-2000s, the firm developed from a catalogues and trade counter business into an e-commerce operation, under the direction of Harriet Green, CEO, who joined the business in 2006.

In 2007 the firm launched its Greater China business, Premier Electronics, with a warehouse and distribution centre in WaiGaoQiao.

Towards the end of 2008 the group began the closure of Cadillac Electric, which was part of the group's Industrial Products division. During the course of 2008 the group acquired Hynetic Electronics, an Indian distributor, and in early 2009 it acquired Microdis Electronics, an electronics distributor based in Poland. In September 2009, it announced the acquisition of CadSoft Computer GmbH, developer of EAGLE electronic design automation software, which it later sold.

In 2010, the legacy brands of Premier Electronics, Farnell and Farnell-Newark were replaced by Farnell element14 in Europe, and by Newark element14 in the US. The name was taken from silicon, the 14th element in the Periodic Table, which is widely used in electronic components such as integrated circuits and discrete semiconductors.

In March 2016, the group sold its Akron Brass subsidiary to IDEX Corporation for $224.2 million.

On 17 October 2016, American company Avnet completed its acquisition of Premier Farnell in a deal valued at approximately £691 million, leading to delisting of Premier Farnell shares. In 2019 the business was rebranded as Farnell, although the company's legal name continues to be Premier Farnell Limited.

== Structure and operations ==
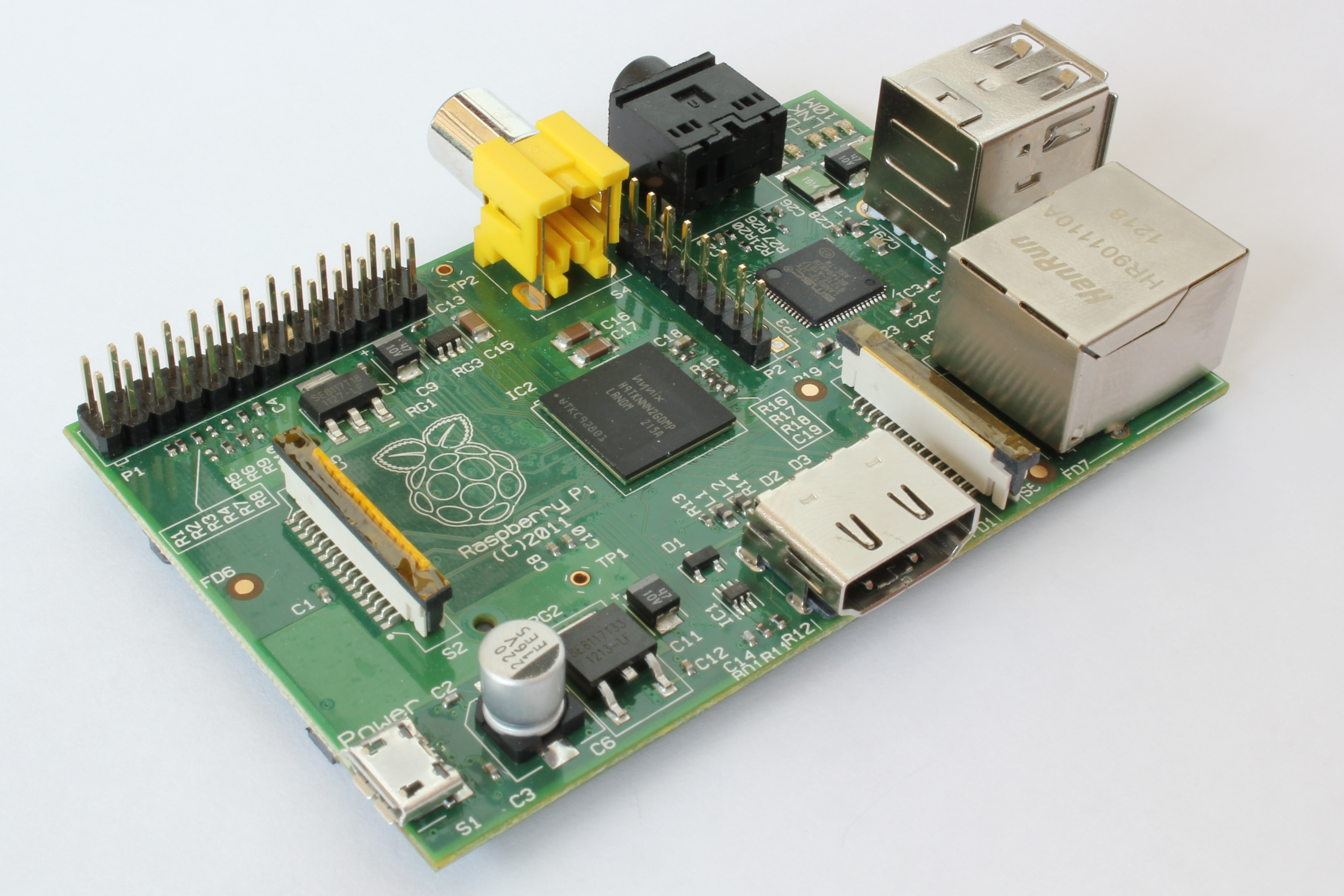
The Raspberry Pi single-board computer

Premier Farnell Limited is a holding company with numerous subsidiaries in Europe and Asia.

The group trades globally under the following names:

Farnell Global group

- Farnell in Europe / Middle East / Africa / Japan
- Farnell export served by other countries
- Newark in the Americas
- element14 in Asia Pacific
- element14 community, a global online information hub and forum for electrical engineers.

Other brands

- CPC in the UK
- Multicomp Pro / Pulse / Pro Elec / Pro Power – major own label brands sold through the Farnell Global group

== Products ==
As of 2024, Premier Farnell stocks 950,000 products from 2,000 suppliers across its regional warehouses. It also sells about half of the Raspberry Pi computers distributed worldwide.

Development kits (often called ‘dev kits’) are a major specialism of Farnell. These are hardware kits typically centred around a particular microprocessor or microcontroller and are used by design engineers to develop and prototype new products. A survey of engineers on the element14 Community identified the big areas for the market in 2014–2015 as being lighting control, sensing and wireless. Another growth area for Farnell is the Internet of Things (IoT), which was the predominant theme at its stall at the electronica fair held in Munich on 11–14 November 2014, showcasing Farnell IoT products such as the RIoTboard.

The BBC announced on 7 July 2015 that it was launching a new computer device called the micro:bit that would be given to every Year 7 school pupil in the UK (amounting to around one million computers) in October 2015 as part of its Make It Digital initiative. Farnell was named as one of the major partners in the consortium behind the micro:bit, taking responsibility for sourcing of components and overseeing the manufacturing process.

== Awards ==
- ECMOD Direct Commerce Award for the best online business B2B, 2012
- BiTC Corporate Responsibility Index – Platinum status, 2012
- Ethisphere Institute – World's Most Ethical Companies List, 2012
