= Avnet =

Electronic component distributor

Coordinates: 33°25′39″N 111°58′47″W

Avnet, Inc.
- Type: Public
- Traded as: Nasdaq: AVT; S&P 400 component
- Industry: Electronics
- Founded: 1921; 105 years ago New York City, New York, U.S.
- Founder: Charles Avnet
- Headquarters: Tempe, Arizona, U.S.
- Key people: Phil Gallagher (CEO); Rodney Adkins (chairman); Ken Jacobson (CFO)
- Revenue: ▲US$26.53 billion (2023)
- Operating income: ▲US$1.35 billion (2023)
- Net income: ▲US$1.18 billion (2023)
- Total assets: ▲US$12.47 billion (2023)
- Total equity: ▲US$4.75 billion (2023)
- Number of employees: c. 14,500 (2021)
- Website: www.avnet.com

Avnet, Inc. is a distributor of electronic components headquartered in Tempe, Arizona, named after Charles Avnet, who founded the company in 1921. After its start on Manhattan's Radio Row, the company was incorporated in 1955 and began trading on the New York Stock Exchange in 1961. On May 8, 2018, Avnet changed stock markets to Nasdaq, trading under the same ticker AVT.

== History ==
=== 1920–1930 ===
In 1921, Charles Avnet, a 33-year-old Russian-Jewish immigrant, began buying surplus radio parts and selling them to the public on the Radio Rows of United States port cities. As radio manufacturing grew, parts distribution took off. In the mid-1920s, when factory-made radios began to replace radio parts, he adjusted his distribution pipeline and began selling parts to manufacturers and dealers. In the mid-1920s, Avnet diversified by branching out into car radio kits and automobile assembly kits. During the Great Depression, he shifted the focus from retailing to wholesaling.

=== 1930–1940 ===
During World War II, Avnet made antennas for the U.S. armed forces. Charles's son, Lester, joined the business at that time. After the war was over, Avnet focused on buying and selling surplus electronic and electrical parts.

=== 1950–1960 ===
In 1955, Avnet Electronic Supply Company was incorporated with a primary business of selling capacitors, fasteners and switches. In 1956, the corporation opened a second connector assembly plant near Los Angeles specifically for the aircraft industry. Three years after it incorporated, the company changed its name to Avnet Electronics Corporation, and went public on the American Stock Exchange the following year.

=== 1960–1970 ===
In 1960, Avnet made its first acquisition, British Industries Corp. (BIC), an audio equipment company. With this acquisition, it began selling die casting machines, guitars, and television antennas, and earned a spot trading on the New York Stock Exchange. In the mid-1960s, the company briefly owned several record labels including Liberty Records and Blue Note. Avnet acquired guitar manufacturer Guild Musical Instruments in 1965; in that year a Guild Starfire 12 guitar was presented to Beatles legends John Lennon and George Harrison.

Over the course of the decade (from 1960 to 1970), Avnet expanded with several acquisitions:

- - - - - - - - - - Avnet Electronic Corporation / Avnet, Inc.
                - - Hamilton Electro Corporation
                    1962
              - - Fairmount Motor Products Co, Inc.
                  1963
            - - Valley Forge Products, Inc.
                1964
          - - Guarantee Generator & Armature Co.
              1965
        - - Channel Master Corporation
            1967
      - - Brownell Inc.
          1968
    - - Carol Wire and Cable Corporation
        1968
  - - Machiz's Time Electronic Sales
      1968

These acquisitions expanded the company into additional fields of semiconductors, relays, and potentiometers. In 1964, the company renamed itself again as Avnet, Incorporated. Founder Charles Avnet died that same year, and his son Lester became president and chairman.

=== 1970–1980 ===
In 1973, Avnet became Intel Corp.'s first distributor, solidifying Avnet's place in the computer business. Together, Avnet and supplier Intel began selling computer peripherals, complete systems, and software. In 1979, Avnet hit $1 billion in revenue for the first time.

In 1979, Lester Avnet died and was succeeded by Simon Sheib as chief executive officer. Sheib, along with Anthony Hamilton, president of the Hamilton Electro Corporation acquisition, combined the two companies to form Hamilton/Avnet, which eventually became Avnet Electronic Marketing Group, led by Hamilton. The company shifted its strategy during this time to focus on sales, warehouse and stocking facilities, product development, and expanding markets, and became the first distributor of semiconductors, integrated circuits, and microprocessors.

=== 1980–2010 ===
In 1998, Roy Vallee became CEO and chairman, the same year that the company relocated its corporate headquarters to Phoenix (from Great Neck, NY). In 2001, Avnet acquired Kent Electronics Corp., a Houston-based distributor of electronic components and installer of computer networks, for stock valued at $600 million.

=== 2010–present ===
In July 2010, the company purchased Bell Microelectronics for $631 million. In July 2011, CEO Roy Vallee retired, and then-COO Richard Hamada was appointed CEO.

In March 2012 Avnet, Inc. acquired Ascendant Technologies and in October 2012, BrightStar Partners, Inc. and BSP Software LLC. This expanded Avnet Technology Solutions.

In September 2016, Tech Data announced that it had entered into an agreement to acquire the Technology Solutions operating group from Avnet, Inc. in a stock and cash transaction valued at approximately US$2.6 billion. Under the terms of the agreement, Avnet received at closing approximately $2.4 billion in cash and 2.785 million shares of Tech Data common stock, representing an approximate 7 percent ownership position in Tech Data. In October 2016, the company purchased British components distributor Premier Farnell for £691M.

In March 2019, Avnet announced that it was working with blockchain payment provider BitPay to accept cryptocurrency as payment for products and services. Avnet stated that it had already closed "several multi-million dollar cryptocurrency transactions" in the first month of accepting Bitcoin.

== Leadership history ==
Chief Executive Officers since the 1970s for Avnet have included:

- Tony Hamilton
- Leon Machiz
- Roy Vallee
- Rick Hamada
- William Amelio
- Phil Gallagher
