= Burt Myers =

American racing driver (born 1975)

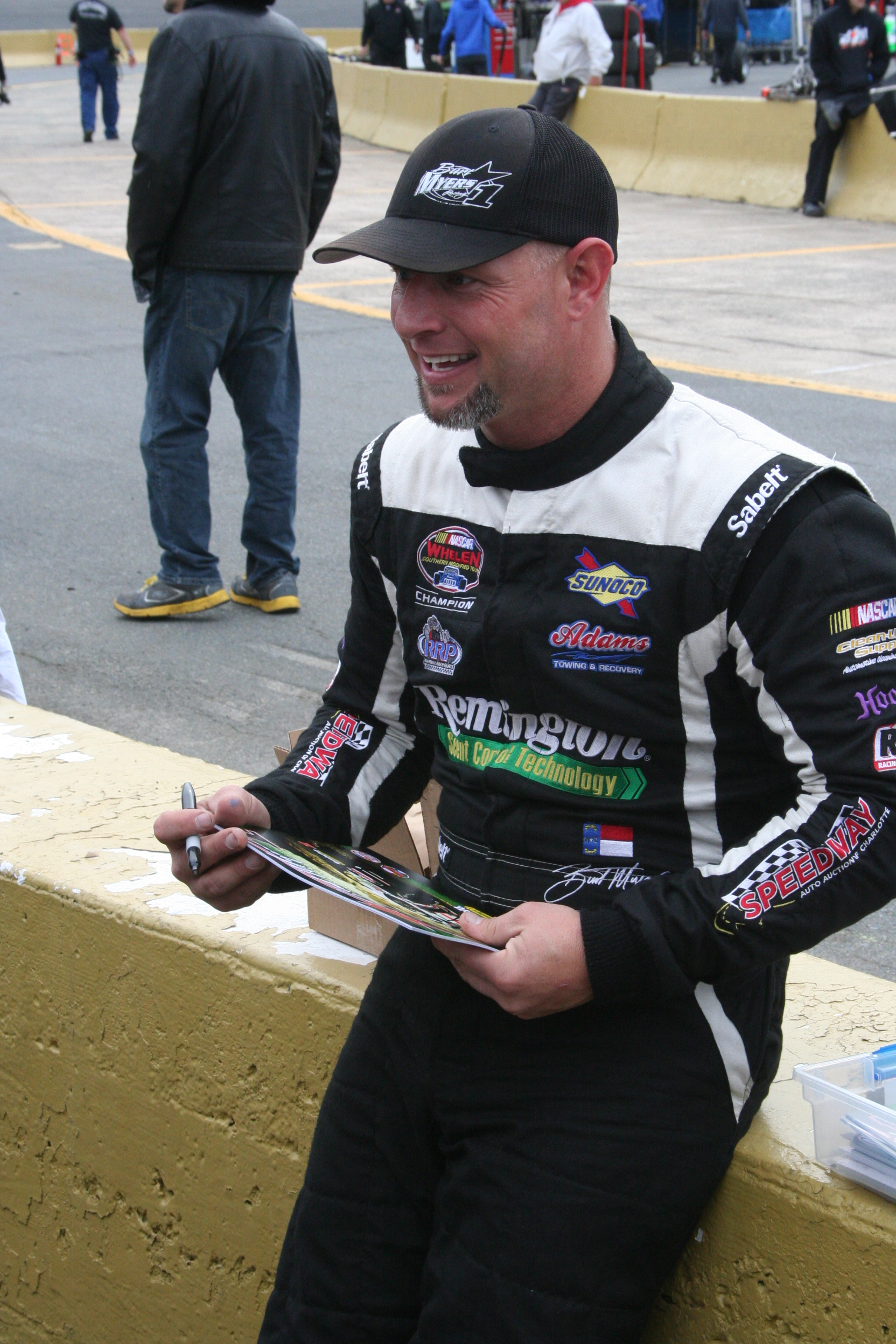
- Myers at Concord Speedway in 2015
- Born: William Burton Myers; December 30, 1975 (age 50); Walnut Cove, North Carolina, U.S.
- Achievements: 2010, 2016 NASCAR Whelen Southern Modified Tour Champion; 2002, 2021, 2023 SMART Modified Tour Champion; 1999, 2001, 2007, 2010, 2011, 2013, 2016, 2017, 2018, 2019, 2024 Bowman Gray Stadium Modified Champion; 2014, 2015 Koma Unwind Modified Madness Series Champion; 2016 Southern Modified Racing Series Champion; 2006 ASA Modified Tour Champion; 2004 Friendship Motor Speedway Modified Champion

NASCAR Cup Series career
- 1 race run over 1 year
- 2025 position: 41st
- Best finish: 41st (2025)
- First race: 2025 Cook Out 400 (Martinsville)
Wins	Top tens	Poles
0	0	0

NASCAR FedEx Freight Truck Series career
- 1 race run over 1 year
- 2009 position: 85th
- Best finish: 85th (2009)
- First race: 2009 Kroger 200 (Martinsville)
Wins	Top tens	Poles
0	0	0
- Statistics up to date as of November 6, 2025.

William Burton Myers (born December 30, 1975) is an American professional stock car racing driver who competes full-time on the SMART Modified Tour. He has previously competed in the NASCAR Cup Series, the NASCAR Camping World Truck Series, and the NASCAR Whelen Modified Tour.

Myers has nineteen career wins and won the 2010 and 2016 NASCAR Whelen Southern Modified Tour Championship, and has won more pole awards than any other driver in the Tour's history. He is also a ten-time track champion at Bowman Gray Stadium.

== History ==
In 1952, Bobby Myers, Burt's great uncle, set the record for the youngest driver ever to win a Stadium title at the age of 25. Bobby won sixteen races and one championship in 1952. Five years later, in 1957, Bobby was killed in a crash at Darlington Raceway in Darlington, South Carolina while driving for Lee Petty. Billy Myers was Burt Myers' grandfather and he ranks twentieth with 22 victories on Bowman Gray Stadium's Modified All-Time Wins List, and he has won three championships ('51,'53,'55). Billy died at Bowman Gray Stadium. In 1999, Myers broke his great uncle's record of being the youngest Bowman Gray Stadium track champion in history at the age of 23, and would go on to win ten more titles in 2001, 2007, 2010, 2011, 2013, 2016, 2017, 2018, 2019, and 2024.

Burt's father, Gary Myers, is the second generation of Myers' to compete at Bowman Gray Stadium. Gary ranks seventh on the stadium's all-time victory list with a total of thirty-eight (38) wins. In addition, he was the 1996 champion on the NASCAR Whelen Southern Modified Tour.

In 2009, Myers made his NASCAR Camping World Truck Series debut at Martinsville Speedway in the Kroger 200. He drove the No. 07 JRC Investments / Wyatt Winstead Foundation Chevrolet owned by Ken Smith. He would start seventeenth and finish nineteenth, one lap down.

Myers was put on probation by NASCAR for the 2009 racing season at Bowman Gray Stadium, along with fellow competitor Junior Miller, as result of his actions in 2008 final race.

Myers was featured in MadHouse, a History Channel television documentary series that followed the drivers at Bowman Gray Stadium for a racing season, as well as the Discovery Channel series Race Night at Bowman Gray.

In 2025, Myers competed in the Cook Out Clash, driving the No. 50 Chevrolet for Team AmeriVet. Myers did not make the main event, crashing out of the last-chance qualifier after making contact with Ricky Stenhouse Jr. On March 8, it was announced that Myers would drive for AmeriVet at the Martinsville spring race.

On January 20, 2026, it was announced that Myers would once again drive for Team AmeriVet at the Cook Out Clash.

== Motorsports career results ==
=== NASCAR ===
(key) (Bold – Pole position awarded by qualifying time. Italics – Pole position earned by points standings or practice time. * – Most laps led.)

==== Cup Series ====
NASCAR Cup Series results
Year	Team	No.	Make	1	2	3	4	5	6	7	8	9	10	11	12	13	14	15	16	17	18	19	20	21	22	23	24	25	26	27	28	29	30	31	32	33	34	35	36	NCSC	Pts	Ref
2025	Team AmeriVet	50	Chevy	DAY	ATL	COA	PHO	LVS	HOM	MAR; 36	DAR	BRI	TAL	TEX	KAN	CLT	NSH	MCH	MXC	POC	ATL	CSC	SON	DOV	IND	IOW	GLN	RCH	DAY	DAR	GTW	BRI	NHA	KAN	ROV	LVS	TAL	MAR	PHO	41st	1	

==== Camping World Truck Series ====
NASCAR Camping World Truck Series results
Year	Team	No.	Make	1	2	3	4	5	6	7	8	9	10	11	12	13	14	15	16	17	18	19	20	21	22	23	24	25	NCWTC	Pts	Ref
2009	SS-Green Light Racing	07	Chevy	DAY	CAL	ATL	MAR	KAN	CLT	DOV	TEX	MCH	MLW	MEM	KEN	IRP	NSH	BRI	CHI	IOW	GTW	NHA	LVS	MAR; 19	TAL	TEX	PHO	HOM	85th	106	

==== Whelen Modified Tour ====
NASCAR Whelen Modified Tour results
Year	Car owner	No.	Make	1	2	3	4	5	6	7	8	9	10	11	12	13	14	15	16	17	18	19	20	21	NWMTC	Pts	Ref
1999		1	Chevy	TMP	RPS	STA	RCH	STA	RIV	JEN	NHA	NZH	HOL	TMP	NHA	RIV	GLN	STA	RPS	TMP	NHA	STA	MAR; 29	TMP	-	-	
2000		01	Chevy	STA	RCH	STA	RIV	SEE	NHA	NZH	TMP	RIV	GLN	TMP	STA	WFD	NHA	STA	MAR; 14	TMP					76th	121	
2002		40	Chevy	TMP	STA	WFD	NZH	RIV	SEE	RCH	STA	BEE	NHA	RIV	TMP	STA	WFD	TMP	NHA	STA	MAR; 21	TMP			76th	100	
2010	Phillip Smith	7	Ford	TMP; 14	STA	STA											TMP; 14								38th	397	
2010	Bill Frasco	1	Ford				MAR; 5	NHA	LIM	MND	RIV	STA	TMP	BRI	NHA	STA									38th	397	
2017	Kim Myers	1	Ford	MYR; 10	TMP	STA	LGY	TMP	RIV	NHA	STA	TMP													41st	83	
2017	Kim Myers	1	Chevy										BRI; 26	SEE	OSW	RIV	NHA	STA							41st	83	
2017	Eddie Harvey	11	Chevy																TMP; 13						41st	83	
2018	Eddie Harvey	1	Chevy	MYR; 16	TMP; 13	STA	SEE	TMP; 19	LGY	RIV; 14	NHA			BRI; 9	OSW	RIV		STA; 10	TMP; 5						23rd	282	
2018	Eddie Harvey	1	Ford									STA; 26	TMP												23rd	282	
2018	Eddie Harvey	11	Chevy														NHA; 3								23rd	282	
2019	Eddie Harvey	1	Chevy	MYR; 7	SBO; 5*	TMP; 6	STA	WAL	SEE																28th	181	
2019	Judy Thilberg	36	Dodge							TMP; 4	RIV	NHA	STA	TMP	OSW	RIV									28th	181	
2019	Marty Edwards	4	Chevy														NHA; 19	STA	TMP						28th	181	
2021	Tim Thilburg	63	Chevy	MAR	STA	RIV	JEN	OSW	RIV	NHA	NRP	STA	BEE	OSW	RCH; 9	RIV	STA								50th	47	
2023	Kim Myers	1	Chevy	NSM	RCH	MON	RIV	LEE	SEE	RIV	WAL	NHA	LMP	THO	LGY	OSW	MON	RIV	NWS; 18	THO	MAR; 29				61st	41	

==== Whelen Southern Modified Tour ====
NASCAR Whelen Southern Modified Tour results
Year	Car owner	No.	Make	1	2	3	4	5	6	7	8	9	10	11	12	13	14	NSWMTC	Pts	Ref
2005	Philip Smith	1	Chevy	**CRW**; 14	CRW; 1	CRW; 2*	CRW; 11	**BGS**; 1	MAR; 12	**ACE**; 1*	ACE; 2*	CRW; 3	CRW; 3	DUB; 7	ACE; 9			2nd	1872	
2006	Philip Smith	1	Chevy	**CRW**; 3	GRE; 4	CRW; 23	DUB; 7	CRW; 5	**BGS**; 17	MAR; 4	CRW; 7	ACE; 3	CRW; 10	**HCY**; 3	**DUB**; 7	SNM; 3		4th	1913	
2007	Philip Smith	1	Chevy	**CRW**; 2	**FAI**; 8	**GRE**; 6	**CRW**; 3	**CRW**; 7	BGS; 1	MAR; 10	**ACE**; 4	CRW; 8	SNM; 5	CRW; 12	CRW; 12			3rd	1798	
2008	Philip Smith	1	Ford	CRW; 25	ACE; 3	**CRW**; 5	**BGS**; 2	CRW; 2	LAN; 6	CRW; 6			CRW; 12	CRW				9th	1355	
2008	Philip Smith	1	Chevy								SNM; 1	MAR						9th	1355	
2009	Philip Smith	1	Ford	**CON**; 4	SBO; 3	CRW; 10	LAN; 9	CRW; 9	BGS; 12	BRI; 2	CRW; 7	MBS; 11	**CRW**; 2	**CRW**; 4	MAR; 1	**ACE**; 3	CRW; 5	3rd	2138	
2010	Philip Smith	1	Ford	ATL; 17	**CRW**; 6	SBO; 8	**CRW**; 5	BGS; 2*	BRI; 2	CRW; 4	LGY; 3	TRI; 1	CLT; 1*					1st	1609	
2011	Philip Smith	1	Ford	CRW; 14*	HCY; 8	SBO	CRW	CRW; 5	BGS; 2	BRI; 6	CRW; 10	**LGY**; 4	THO; 2	TRI; 3	CRW; 8	CLT; 3	CRW; 2	9th	1854	
2012	Philip Smith	1	Ford	CRW; 8	CRW; 9	SBO; 7	CRW; 10	CRW; 15	**BGS**; 9	BRI; 13	LGY	THO; 4		CLT; 3				10th	353	
2012	Kim Myers	1	Ford										CRW; 11					10th	353	
2013	Kim Myers	1	Ford	CRW; 17	SNM; 1	SBO; 6	CRW; 7	CRW; 6	BGS; 2	BRI; 1	LGY; 7	CRW; 16	**CRW**; 8	**SNM**; 3	CLT; 1			3rd	465	
2014	Kim Myers	1	Ford	CRW; 4	SNM; 5	SBO; 6	LGY; 6	CRW; 17	BGS; 10	BRI; 3	LGY; 1	CRW; 1	SBO; 4	**SNM**; 1*	CRW; 2	CRW; 16*	CLT; 1*	3rd	560	
2015	Kim Myers	1	Ford	CRW; 6	CRW; 5	SBO; 3	LGY; 1	CRW; 16	BGS; 4	BRI; 11	LGY; 4	SBO; 6	CLT; 5					4th	384	
2016	Kim Myers	1	Ford	CRW; 1*	CON; 3	**SBO**; 2	CRW; 1*	CRW; 4	BGS; 1		**ECA**; 5*	SBO; 5	CRW; 2*	CLT; 6				1st	465	
2016	Kim Myers	1S	Ford							BRI; 9								1st	465	

=== SMART Modified Tour ===
SMART Modified Tour results
Year	Car owner	No.	Make	1	2	3	4	5	6	7	8	9	10	11	12	13	14	SMTC	Pts	Ref
1995	Gary Myers	4	N/A	SUM; 17	CRW		CRW; 14	MYB; 8		NWS; 25	PSS; 18	FCR						18th	974	
1995	N/A	41	N/A			TRI; 18			CRW; 22									18th	974	
1995	N/A	16	N/A										HCY; 14					18th	974	
1995	N/A	1	N/A											CRW; 25				18th	974	
1996	Gary Myers	4	Chevy	SUM; 17	CRW; 11	NWS; 17	FCR; 9	FCR; 7	TRI; 11	CRW; 7	MYB; 20	CRW; 9	NWS; 17	FCR; 19	CRW; 5			9th	1577	
1997	Gary Myers	4	Chevy	TRI; 6	CRW; 9	MYB; 12	CRW; 3	CRW; 5										N/A	740	
1998	Gary Myers	4	Chevy	CRW; 8	CON; 18	TRI; 15	CRW; 14	SUM; 4	MYB; 10	**TRI**; 2	CRW; 7	CRW; 7						N/A	N/A	
1999	Gary Myers	4	Chevy	SUM; 10	CRW; 5	LPS; 7	CRW; 21	CON; 3	CRW; 2	TRI; 4	MYB; 1	CRW; 21	FCR; 12	CRW; 4	CRW; 3	CRW; 24		N/A	N/A	
2000	Gary Myers	4	Chevy	CRW; 26	JAC; 4	AND; 7	CRW; 15	MYB; 10	CRW; 8	ACE; 3	CRW; 4	PUL; 5	CRW; 5	CRW; 2				4th	1675	
2001	Gary Myers	4	Chevy	CRW; 6	CRW; 3	AND; 4	LAN; 3	CRW; 8	MYB; 5	ACE; 6	CRW; 3	PUL; 10	CRW; 2	CRW; 1*	CRW; 1	SBS; 5		2nd	2156	
2002	Gary Myers	4	Chevy	SUM; 1	CRW; 2	LAN; 3	**CRW**; 5	ACE; 1	CRW; 7	PUL; 1	CRW; 14	CON; 4	CRW; 4					1st	1702	
2003	Gary Myers	4	Chevy	CRW; 21	**SUM**; 4	CRW; 7	UMP; 7	UMP; 2*	CRW; 8	MYB; 16	ACE; 3	CRW; 19	UMP; 1	CON; 5	UMP; 3			6th	1835	
2004	Gary Myers	4	Chevy	CRW; 17														5th	1885	
2004	Philip Smith	1	Chevy		UMP; 8	**CRW**; 4	CRW; 8	UMP; 1**	UMP; 2	**CRW**; 10	MYB; 10	CRW; 4	CRW; 5	PUL; 5	CON; 6	UMP; 24		5th	1885	
2021	Kim Myers	1	PSR	CRW; 2	FLO; 5	SBO; 3	FCS; 8	CRW; 11	DIL; 13	CAR; 8	CRW; 3	DOM; 2	**PUL**; 3	**HCY**; 4	ACE; 15			1st	305	
2022	Kim Myers	1	PSR	FLO; 4	SNM; 3	CRW; 2	SBO; 6	FCS; 4	CRW; 20	NWS; 5	NWS; 5	**CAR**; 2	DOM; 5	HCY; 2	TRI; DSQ	PUL; 5		5th	267	
2023	Kim Myers	1	PSR	FLO; 3	CRW; 7*	SBO; 3	HCY; 3	FCS; 1	CRW; 1*	ACE; 1	CAR; 5	PUL; 7	TRI; 5	SBO; 7	ROU; 10			1st	502	
2024	Kim Myers	1	PSR	FLO; 2	CRW; 17		**TRI**; 14	**ROU**; 4	HCY; 2	FCS; 13	CRW; 4	JAC; 9	CAR; 20	CRW; 4	DOM; 4	SBO; 1	NWS; 24	4th	517	
2024	Kim Myers	1BM	PSR			SBO; 6												4th	517	
2025	Kim Myers	1	PSR	FLO; 13	AND; 4	SBO; 13	ROU; 21	HCY; 19	FCS; 7	CRW; 10	CPS; 9	CAR; 9	CRW; 4	DOM; 11	FCS; 6	**TRI**; 2	NWS; 18	7th	429	
2026	Kim Myers	1	PSR	FLO; 6	AND; 3	SBO; 22	DOM; 8	HCY; 4	WKS; 6	FCR; 7	CRW; 3	PUL; 16	CAR; 10	ROU; 16	TRI; 7	NWS; 10		5th	605	
