= Southern Modified Race Tour =

- Category: Stock cars
- Country: United States
- Inaugural season: 2014
- Folded: 2016
- Constructors: Troyer, Chassis Dynamics, RaceWorks, Spafco, LFR
- Engine suppliers: RahMoc, Robert Yates Racing, Hutter, ECR, Bob Bruneau, Performance Engines by Billy the Kid, Performance Technology
- Tire suppliers: Hoosier
- Last Drivers' champion: Burt Myers (2015)
- Last Makes' champion: LFR (2015)
- Last Teams' champion: Myers Racing (2015)
- Official website: Southern Modified Race Tour

The Southern Modified Race Tour (formerly known as Koma Unwind Modified Madness Series in 2014 & 2015) was a modified stock car racing series that raced in the Southeastern United States. The series was formed in 2014 and is owned/operated by the Southern Modified Race Tour. The series features 2 classes of racing, the primary class (Modified) uses very similar rules package to the NASCAR Whelen Modified Tour, NASCAR Whelen Southern Modified Tour and other modified touring series in the northeastern United States. They also have a Mod Lite class that features similar rules package to the Modified Lite class at Caraway Speedway and to the Modified class at ACE Speedway and must declare their home track to 1 of those tracks. The series ceased operations following the 2016 season.

== History ==
The series was created in the winter of 2013–2014 to have more races for Modified stock car racing in the Southeastern United States and under a similar format of the old Southern Modified Auto Racing Teams tour. A lot of drivers crossover between the Koma Unwind Series, NASCAR Whelen Southern Modified Tour and the local tracks of Bowman Gray Stadium, ACE Speedway, Caraway Speedway and other tracks & series in the Northeastern United States.

The series sponsor from 2014 and 2015 is Koma Unwind a Relaxation drink produced by Bebida Beverage Company.

== Series champions ==
Year	Driver	Team	Wins	Number	Engine Make	Sponsor	Chassis Make
2014	Burt Myers	Myers Racing	2	#1	Ford	Citrusafe BBQ Grill Cleaner	LFR
2015	Burt Myers	Myers Racing	4	#1	Ford	Citrusafe BBQ Grill Cleaner	LFR
2016	Cale Gale		2	#95			

== Venues ==
- ACE Speedway – Altamahaw, North Carolina – (4/10 Mile Asphalt Oval)
- Anderson Motor Speedway – Anderson, South Carolina – (3/8 Mile Asphalt Oval)
- Carteret County Speedway – Cape Carteret, North Carolina – (4/10 Mile Asphalt Oval)
- Coastal Plains Raceway Park – Jacksonville, North Carolina – (4/10 Mile Asphalt Oval)
- Concord Speedway – Midland, North Carolina – (1/2 Mile Asphalt Oval)
- Franklin County Speedway – Callaway, Virginia – (3/8 Mile Asphalt Oval)
- Hickory Motor Speedway – Newton, North Carolina – (0.333 Mile Asphalt Oval)
- Kingsport Speedway – Kingsport, Tennessee – (4/10 Mile Asphalt Oval)
- Myrtle Beach Speedway – Myrtle Beach, South Carolina – (0.625 Mile Asphalt Oval)
- Orange County Speedway – Rougemont, North Carolina – (3/8 Mile Asphalt Oval)

== Winners list ==
=== Modified winners ===
Driver	Total
Burt Myers	6
Tim Brown	3
Cale Gale	3
Zach Brewer	2
David Calabrese	1
Andy Jankowiak	1
Jason Myers	1
Gary Putnam	1

=== Modified Lite winners ===
Driver	Total
Jimmy Wallace	7
Scott Hall	3
Drew Moffit	1
Daniel Beeson	1
Jerry Scott	1

== 2014 Drivers results ==
(key) Bold - Pole position awarded by time.

Pos	Driver	HICK	CPS	ACE	HICK	AND	ACE	OCS	MBS	Points
1	Burt Myers	3	3	**1**	2	**2**	9	**1**	**2**	1173
2	Tim Brown	1	7	4	**8**	1	1	4	12	1086
3	Jason Myers	**2**	4	2	5	5	**4**	3	5	1065
4	Bobby Sheffield	10	6	5	3	3	8	8	3	993
5	Spencer Davis	4	**2**	16	16	8	7	14	7	928
6	Jeremy Mayfield	8	9	8	7	4	16	6	13	904
7	Zach Brewer	7		7	1		6	2	1	827
8	Johnny Sutton		10	3	14	13	3	5	14	793
9	Jimmy Wallace		8	9	12	10	17		16	600
10	Mike Speeney	9			4	6		9	11	571
11	Mike Norman				11	11	10	7	17	508
12	David Calabreese		1	12	9		15			463
13	Danny Propst	11				14	18	17		408
14	Tommy Neal	13		10				10	19	388
15	Dan Speeney		5	6			5			380
16	Gary Young Jr.			14	19		13	13		375
17	Tom Buzze				7			15	8	325
18	Cale Gale	15	11		10					296
19	Scott Hall				20		11	11		284
20	Jeff Fultz				6	9				228
	Josh Nichols	5			17					
	Jimmy Zacharias	6							9	
	Gary Putnam							12	6	
	Joseph Brown	12		13						
	Renee Dupuis	14			13					
	Austin Thompson				15	12				
	Jonathan Brown					2				
	Bobby Measmer Jr.								4	
	Jason Tutterrow								10	
	Austin Pack			11						
	Matt Wentz						12			
	Brent Wentz						14			
	Willie Chilton			15						
	Frank Ruocco								15	
	Brian Weber	16								
	Mark Johnson							16		
	JR Bertuccio				18					
	Al Ermarrinio								18	
Pos	Driver	HICK	CPS	ACE	HICK	AND	ACE	OCS	MBS	Points

== 2015 Drivers results ==
(key) Bold - Pole position awarded by time.

Pos	Driver	HICK	ACE	KING	CMP	AND	HICK	OCS	CCS	Points
1	Burt Myers	1	1	8	1	1	3	5	4	1182
2	Jason Myers	3	2	1	2	10	11	2	5	1062
3	Dan Speeney		4	2	3	6	13	4	15	945
4	Jimmy Wallace	13	14	5	8	2	16	8	8	889
5	Buddy Ellis	17	8	7	10	13	19	9	10	810
6	Jeremy Mayfield	19	15		5	11	6	13	9	745
7	Mike Norman	10	11	4	12	7	20		12	731
8	Tom Buzze	15	7		16	3	9		14	645
9	Gary Putnam	5	5		6			1		540
10	Andy Jankowiak					9	1	11	3	508
11	Spencer Davis	9	6	3	9					494
12	Cale Gale						2	3	1	455
13	Zach Brewer									452
14	A.J. Winstead									445
15	Don Johnson									384
16	Brandon Ward									336
17	Drew Moffitt									317
18	Danny Propst									298
19	Jason Tutterow									298
20	Chris Pasteryak									280
21	Josh Nichols									212
22	Bobby Measmer, Jr.									212
23	Scott Hall									206
24	Daniel Yates									205
25	Bobby Sheffield									204
26	Caleb Holman									201
27	Jerry Scott									200
28	Daniel Beeson									188
29	Bryan Dauzat									188
30	Bob Summers									172
31	John Smith									135
32	Kyle Bonsignore									130
33	Ryan Preece									120
34	Dean Ward									120
35	Jamie Tomaino									116
36	Joe Ryan Osborne									112
37	Kevin Orlando									100
38	Mike Speeney									100
39	Darryl Gwynn									100
40	Brian Cranmer									92
41	Jeremy Gerstner									92
42	Chase Hunt									76
43	Danny Watts									74
44	William Smith									72
45	David Calabrese									70
46	Renee Dupuis									66
Pos	Driver	HICK	CPS	ACE	HICK	AND	ACE	OCS	MBS	Points
