= 2024 Xfinity 500 =

NASCAR Cup Series race

Race details
- Race 35 of 36 in the 2024 NASCAR Cup Series
- 2024 Xfinity 500 official program
- Date: November 3, 2024
- Location: Martinsville Speedway in Ridgeway, Virginia
- Course: Permanent racing facility
- Course length: 0.526 miles (0.847 km)
- Distance: 500 laps, 263 mi (423.5 km)
- Average speed: 75.677 miles per hour (121.790 km/h)

Pole position
| Driver | Martin Truex Jr. | Joe Gibbs Racing |
- Time: 19.686

Most laps led
| Driver | Brad Keselowski | RFK Racing |
- Laps: 170

Winner
| No. 12 | Ryan Blaney | Team Penske |

Television in the United States
- Network: NBC
- Announcers: Leigh Diffey, Jeff Burton, and Steve Letarte
- Nielsen ratings: 2.5 million

Radio in the United States
- Radio: MRN
- Booth announcers: Alex Hayden, Mike Bagley, and Todd Gordon
- Turn announcers: Dave Moody (Backstretch)

The 2024 Xfinity 500 was a NASCAR Cup Series race held on November 3, 2024, at Martinsville Speedway in Ridgeway, Virginia. Contested over 500 laps on the 0.526 mile (0.847 km) paperclip-shaped short track, it was the 35th race of the 2024 NASCAR Cup Series season, the ninth race of the Playoffs, and final race of the Round of 8. Ryan Blaney won the race. Chase Elliott finished 2nd, and Kyle Larson finished 3rd. Austin Cindric and Denny Hamlin rounded out the top five, and William Byron, Austin Dillon, Ross Chastain, Brad Keselowski, and Joey Logano rounded out the top ten.

== Report ==
=== Background ===
Martinsville Speedway, the track where the race was held.

Martinsville Speedway is a NASCAR-owned stock car racing track located in Henry County, in Ridgeway, Virginia, just to the south of Martinsville. At 0.526 miles (0.847 km) in length, it is the shortest track in the NASCAR Cup Series. The track was also one of the first paved oval tracks in NASCAR, being built in 1947 by H. Clay Earles. It is also the only remaining race track on the NASCAR circuit since its beginning in 1948.

==== Entry list ====
- (R) denotes rookie driver.
- (P) denotes playoff driver.
- (i) denotes driver who is ineligible for series driver points.

| No. | Driver | Team | Manufacturer |
|---|---|---|---|
| 1 | Ross Chastain | Trackhouse Racing | Chevrolet |
| 2 | Austin Cindric | Team Penske | Ford |
| 3 | Austin Dillon | Richard Childress Racing | Chevrolet |
| 4 | Josh Berry (R) | Stewart-Haas Racing | Ford |
| 5 | Kyle Larson (P) | Hendrick Motorsports | Chevrolet |
| 6 | Brad Keselowski | RFK Racing | Ford |
| 7 | Justin Haley | Spire Motorsports | Chevrolet |
| 8 | Kyle Busch | Richard Childress Racing | Chevrolet |
| 9 | Chase Elliott (P) | Hendrick Motorsports | Chevrolet |
| 10 | Noah Gragson | Stewart-Haas Racing | Ford |
| 11 | Denny Hamlin (P) | Joe Gibbs Racing | Toyota |
| 12 | Ryan Blaney (P) | Team Penske | Ford |
| 14 | Chase Briscoe | Stewart-Haas Racing | Ford |
| 15 | Kaz Grala | Rick Ware Racing | Ford |
| 16 | Shane van Gisbergen (i) | Kaulig Racing | Chevrolet |
| 17 | Chris Buescher | RFK Racing | Ford |
| 19 | Martin Truex Jr. | Joe Gibbs Racing | Toyota |
| 20 | Christopher Bell (P) | Joe Gibbs Racing | Toyota |
| 21 | Harrison Burton | Wood Brothers Racing | Ford |
| 22 | Joey Logano (P) | Team Penske | Ford |
| 23 | Bubba Wallace | 23XI Racing | Toyota |
| 24 | William Byron (P) | Hendrick Motorsports | Chevrolet |
| 31 | Daniel Hemric | Kaulig Racing | Chevrolet |
| 34 | Michael McDowell | Front Row Motorsports | Ford |
| 38 | Todd Gilliland | Front Row Motorsports | Ford |
| 41 | Ryan Preece | Stewart-Haas Racing | Ford |
| 42 | John Hunter Nemechek | Legacy Motor Club | Toyota |
| 43 | Erik Jones | Legacy Motor Club | Toyota |
| 45 | Tyler Reddick (P) | 23XI Racing | Toyota |
| 47 | Ricky Stenhouse Jr. | JTG Daugherty Racing | Chevrolet |
| 48 | Alex Bowman | Hendrick Motorsports | Chevrolet |
| 51 | Corey LaJoie | Rick Ware Racing | Ford |
| 54 | Ty Gibbs | Joe Gibbs Racing | Toyota |
| 66 | Josh Bilicki (i) | Power Source | Ford |
| 71 | Zane Smith (R) | Spire Motorsports | Chevrolet |
| 77 | Carson Hocevar (R) | Spire Motorsports | Chevrolet |
| 99 | Daniel Suárez | Trackhouse Racing | Chevrolet |
Official entry list

== Practice ==
Martin Truex Jr. was the fastest in the practice session with a time of 19.918 seconds and a speed of 95.070 mph (153.000 km/h).

=== Practice results ===
| Pos | No. | Driver | Team | Manufacturer | Time | Speed |
|---|---|---|---|---|---|---|
| 1 | 19 | Martin Truex Jr. | Joe Gibbs Racing | Toyota | 19.918 | 95.070 |
| 2 | 51 | Corey LaJoie | Rick Ware Racing | Ford | 19.935 | 94.989 |
| 3 | 11 | Denny Hamlin (P) | Joe Gibbs Racing | Toyota | 19.957 | 94.884 |
Official practice results

== Qualifying ==
Martin Truex Jr. scored the pole for the race with a time of 19.686 and a speed of 96.190 mph (154.803 km/h). Denny Hamlin did not set a time after crashing in Practice.

=== Qualifying results ===
| Pos | No. | Driver | Team | Manufacturer | R1 | R2 |
|---|---|---|---|---|---|---|
| 1 | 19 | Martin Truex Jr. | Joe Gibbs Racing | Toyota | 19.584 | 19.686 |
| 2 | 9 | Chase Elliott (P) | Hendrick Motorsports | Chevrolet | 19.715 | 19.758 |
| 3 | 24 | William Byron (P) | Hendrick Motorsports | Chevrolet | 19.633 | 19.735 |
| 4 | 14 | Chase Briscoe | Stewart–Haas Racing | Ford | 19.701 | 19.767 |
| 5 | 54 | Ty Gibbs | Joe Gibbs Racing | Toyota | 19.674 | 19.743 |
| 6 | 21 | Harrison Burton | Wood Brothers Racing | Ford | 19.739 | 19.807 |
| 7 | 48 | Alex Bowman | Hendrick Motorsports | Chevrolet | 19.735 | 19.744 |
| 8 | 41 | Ryan Preece | Stewart–Haas Racing | Ford | 19.706 | 19.831 |
| 9 | 5 | Kyle Larson (P) | Hendrick Motorsports | Chevrolet | 19.747 | 19.809 |
| 10 | 3 | Austin Dillon | Richard Childress Racing | Chevrolet | 19.770 | 19.856 |
| 11 | 4 | Josh Berry (R) | Stewart–Haas Racing | Ford | 19.776 | — |
| 12 | 22 | Joey Logano (P) | Team Penske | Ford | 19.795 | — |
| 13 | 38 | Todd Gilliland | Front Row Motorsports | Ford | 19.779 | — |
| 14 | 12 | Ryan Blaney (P) | Team Penske | Ford | 19.796 | — |
| 15 | 31 | Daniel Hemric | Kaulig Racing | Chevrolet | 19.793 | — |
| 16 | 20 | Christopher Bell (P) | Joe Gibbs Racing | Toyota | 19.801 | — |
| 17 | 34 | Michael McDowell | Front Row Motorsports | Ford | 19.809 | — |
| 18 | 6 | Brad Keselowski | RFK Racing | Ford | 19.803 | — |
| 19 | 23 | Bubba Wallace | 23XI Racing | Toyota | 19.830 | — |
| 20 | 99 | Daniel Suárez | Trackhouse Racing | Chevrolet | 19.805 | — |
| 21 | 43 | Erik Jones | Legacy Motor Club | Toyota | 19.831 | — |
| 22 | 1 | Ross Chastain | Trackhouse Racing | Chevrolet | 19.825 | — |
| 23 | 8 | Kyle Busch | Richard Childress Racing | Chevrolet | 19.842 | — |
| 24 | 2 | Austin Cindric | Team Penske | Ford | 19.883 | — |
| 25 | 10 | Noah Gragson | Stewart–Haas Racing | Ford | 19.857 | — |
| 26 | 17 | Chris Buescher | RFK Racing | Ford | 19.925 | — |
| 27 | 77 | Carson Hocevar (R) | Spire Motorsports | Chevrolet | 19.866 | — |
| 28 | 47 | Ricky Stenhouse Jr. | JTG Daugherty Racing | Chevrolet | 19.926 | — |
| 29 | 16 | Shane van Gisbergen (i) | Kaulig Racing | Chevrolet | 19.895 | — |
| 30 | 7 | Justin Haley | Spire Motorsports | Chevrolet | 20.000 | — |
| 31 | 45 | Tyler Reddick (P) | 23XI Racing | Toyota | 19.902 | — |
| 32 | 42 | John Hunter Nemechek | Legacy Motor Club | Toyota | 20.069 | — |
| 33 | 15 | Kaz Grala | Rick Ware Racing | Ford | 20.094 | — |
| 34 | 51 | Corey LaJoie | Rick Ware Racing | Ford | 20.110 | — |
| 35 | 66 | Josh Bilicki (i) | Power Source | Ford | 20.296 | — |
| 36 | 71 | Zane Smith (R) | Spire Motorsports | Chevrolet | 20.156 | — |
| 37 | 11 | Denny Hamlin (P) | Joe Gibbs Racing | Toyota | 0.000 | — |
Official qualifying results

== Race ==
=== Race results ===
==== Stage results ====
Stage One Laps: 130

| Pos | No | Driver | Team | Manufacturer | Points |
|---|---|---|---|---|---|
| 1 | 9 | Chase Elliott (P) | Hendrick Motorsports | Chevrolet | 10 |
| 2 | 24 | William Byron (P) | Hendrick Motorsports | Chevrolet | 9 |
| 3 | 14 | Chase Briscoe | Stewart-Haas Racing | Ford | 8 |
| 4 | 41 | Ryan Preece | Stewart-Haas Racing | Ford | 7 |
| 5 | 12 | Ryan Blaney (P) | Team Penske | Ford | 6 |
| 6 | 5 | Kyle Larson (P) | Hendrick Motorsports | Chevrolet | 5 |
| 7 | 48 | Alex Bowman | Hendrick Motorsports | Chevrolet | 4 |
| 8 | 3 | Austin Dillon | Richard Childress Racing | Chevrolet | 3 |
| 9 | 22 | Joey Logano (P) | Team Penske | Ford | 2 |
| 10 | 6 | Brad Keselowski | RFK Racing | Ford | 1 |
Official stage one results

Stage Two Laps: 130

| Pos | No | Driver | Team | Manufacturer | Points |
|---|---|---|---|---|---|
| 1 | 6 | Brad Keselowski | RFK Racing | Ford | 10 |
| 2 | 12 | Ryan Blaney (P) | Team Penske | Ford | 9 |
| 3 | 11 | Denny Hamlin (P) | Joe Gibbs Racing | Toyota | 8 |
| 4 | 5 | Kyle Larson (P) | Hendrick Motorsports | Chevrolet | 7 |
| 5 | 24 | William Byron (P) | Hendrick Motorsports | Chevrolet | 6 |
| 6 | 20 | Christopher Bell (P) | Joe Gibbs Racing | Toyota | 5 |
| 7 | 3 | Austin Dillon | Richard Childress Racing | Chevrolet | 4 |
| 8 | 48 | Alex Bowman | Hendrick Motorsports | Chevrolet | 3 |
| 9 | 10 | Noah Gragson | Stewart-Haas Racing | Ford | 2 |
| 10 | 41 | Ryan Preece | Stewart-Haas Racing | Ford | 1 |
Official stage two results

=== Final Stage results ===
Stage Three Laps: 240

| Pos | Grid | No | Driver | Team | Manufacturer | Laps | Points |
|---|---|---|---|---|---|---|---|
| 1 | 14 | 12 | Ryan Blaney (P) | Team Penske | Ford | 500 | 55 |
| 2 | 2 | 9 | Chase Elliott (P) | Hendrick Motorsports | Chevrolet | 500 | 45 |
| 3 | 9 | 5 | Kyle Larson (P) | Hendrick Motorsports | Chevrolet | 500 | 46 |
| 4 | 24 | 2 | Austin Cindric | Team Penske | Ford | 500 | 33 |
| 5 | 37 | 11 | Denny Hamlin (P) | Joe Gibbs Racing | Toyota | 500 | 40 |
| 6 | 3 | 24 | William Byron (P) | Hendrick Motorsports | Chevrolet | 500 | 46 |
| 7 | 10 | 3 | Austin Dillon | Richard Childress Racing | Chevrolet | 500 | 37 |
| 8 | 22 | 1 | Ross Chastain | Trackhouse Racing | Chevrolet | 500 | 29 |
| 9 | 18 | 6 | Brad Keselowski | RFK Racing | Ford | 500 | 39 |
| 10 | 12 | 22 | Joey Logano (P) | Team Penske | Ford | 500 | 29 |
| 11 | 25 | 10 | Noah Gragson | Stewart-Haas Racing | Ford | 500 | 28 |
| 12 | 29 | 16 | Shane van Gisbergen (i) | Kaulig Racing | Chevrolet | 500 | 0 |
| 13 | 7 | 48 | Alex Bowman | Hendrick Motorsports | Chevrolet | 500 | 31 |
| 14 | 8 | 41 | Ryan Preece | Stewart-Haas Racing | Ford | 500 | 31 |
| 15 | 4 | 14 | Chase Briscoe | Stewart-Haas Racing | Ford | 500 | 30 |
| 16 | 11 | 4 | Josh Berry (R) | Stewart-Haas Racing | Ford | 500 | 21 |
| 17 | 15 | 31 | Daniel Hemric | Kaulig Racing | Chevrolet | 500 | 20 |
| 18 | 19 | 23 | Bubba Wallace | 23XI Racing | Toyota | 499 | 19 |
| 19 | 21 | 43 | Erik Jones | Legacy Motor Club | Toyota | 499 | 18 |
| 20 | 28 | 47 | Ricky Stenhouse Jr. | JTG Daugherty Racing | Chevrolet | 499 | 17 |
| 21 | 36 | 71 | Zane Smith (R) | Spire Motorsports | Chevrolet | 499 | 16 |
| 22 | 16 | 20 | Christopher Bell (P) (Note: Bell originally finished 18th and would have advanced to the Championship 4, but he was demoted to 22nd (last car on his lap) and eliminated from championship contention after NASCAR ruled his wallride maneuver was illegal.) | Joe Gibbs Racing | Toyota | 499 | 20 |
| 23 | 20 | 99 | Daniel Suárez | Trackhouse Racing | Chevrolet | 498 | 14 |
| 24 | 1 | 19 | Martin Truex Jr. | Joe Gibbs Racing | Toyota | 498 | 13 |
| 25 | 27 | 77 | Carson Hocevar (R) | Spire Motorsports | Chevrolet | 498 | 12 |
| 26 | 13 | 38 | Todd Gilliland | Front Row Motorsports | Ford | 498 | 11 |
| 27 | 33 | 15 | Kaz Grala (R) | Rick Ware Racing | Ford | 497 | 10 |
| 28 | 23 | 8 | Kyle Busch | Richard Childress Racing | Chevrolet | 497 | 9 |
| 29 | 30 | 7 | Justin Haley | Spire Motorsports | Chevrolet | 497 | 8 |
| 30 | 26 | 17 | Chris Buescher | RFK Racing | Ford | 497 | 7 |
| 31 | 32 | 42 | John Hunter Nemechek | Legacy Motor Club | Toyota | 496 | 6 |
| 32 | 5 | 54 | Ty Gibbs | Joe Gibbs Racing | Toyota | 495 | 5 |
| 33 | 17 | 34 | Michael McDowell | Front Row Motorsports | Ford | 490 | 4 |
| 34 | 31 | 45 | Tyler Reddick (P) | 23XI Racing | Toyota | 458 | 3 |
| 35 | 34 | 51 | Corey LaJoie | Rick Ware Racing | Ford | 365 | 2 |
| 36 | 6 | 21 | Harrison Burton | Wood Brothers Racing | Ford | 347 | 1 |
| 37 | 35 | 66 | Josh Bilicki (i) | Power Source | Ford | 131 | 0 |
Official race results

=== Race statistics ===
- Lead changes: 15 among 7 different drivers
- Cautions/Laps: 6 for 66
- Red flags: 0
- Time of race: 3 hours, 28 minutes, and 31 seconds
- Average speed: 75.677 miles per hour (121.790 km/h)

== Late-race controversy ==
The ending to the race was shrouded in controversy, as Christopher Bell attempted to do a wall ride move, similar to a move Ross Chastain did in 2022's running. NASCAR however deemed the move was a safety violation (the move had been banned at the beginning of the 2023 season) and was removed from the Championship 4 in Phoenix; William Byron entered the Championship 4 as a result. The move was dubbed as "Fail Melon" by fans and media after the controversial move.

Further controversy surrounded allegations of intra-manufacturer team orders involving Austin Dillon and Chastain, both driving Chevrolets, on behalf of Byron. NASCAR would later announce that they would further investigate the actions of the No. 1, 3, and 23 teams. The investigation of the No. 23 team included the car being torn down in order to search for Wallace's car supposed late-race mechanical issues, as his car slowed down prior to Bell's wall ride.

NASCAR announced the penalties on November 5, with each driver (Dillon, Chastain, and Wallace) being fined, as well as a loss of driver points, each teams' team executives, crew chiefs and spotters being suspended from Phoenix. 2 members of RCR's team, Josh Sobecki and Michael Russell, were also suspended from next season's race at Bowman Gray.

== Media ==
=== Television ===
NBC covered the race on the television side. Leigh Diffey, 1997 race winner Jeff Burton and Steve Letarte called the race from the broadcast booth. Dave Burns, Kim Coon, Parker Kligerman and Marty Snider handled the pit road duties from pit lane.

NBC
| Booth announcers | Pit reporters |
|---|---|
| Lap-by-lap: Leigh Diffey; Color-commentator: Jeff Burton; Color-commentator: Steve Letarte | Dave Burns; Kim Coon; Parker Kligerman; Marty Snider |

=== Radio ===
MRN had the radio call for the race, which was also simulcast on Sirius XM NASCAR Radio. Alex Hayden, Mike Bagley and 7 time Martinsville winner Rusty Wallace had the call for MRN when the field raced down the front straightaway. Dave Moody covered the action for MRN when the field raced down the backstraightway into turn 3. MRN Lead Pit Reporter Steve Post, Jacklyn Drake, and Chris Wilner covered the action for MRN from pit lane.

MRN
| Booth announcers | Turn announcers | Pit reporters |
|---|---|---|
| Lead announcer: Alex Hayden; Announcer: Mike Bagley; Announcer: Rusty Wallace | Backstretch: Dave Moody | Steve Post; Jacklyn Drake; Chris Wilner |

== Standings after the race ==
Drivers' Championship standings

| | Pos | Driver | Points |
|---|---|---|---|
| 5 | 1 | Ryan Blaney | 5,000 |
| 5 | 2 | Joey Logano | 5,000 (–0) |
| 1 | 3 | Tyler Reddick | 5,000 (–0) |
| 2 | 4 | William Byron | 5,000 (–0) |
| 4 | 5 | Christopher Bell | 2,363 (–2,637) |
| 3 | 6 | Kyle Larson | 2,339 (–2,661) |
| 1 | 7 | Chase Elliott | 2,304 (–2,696) |
| 1 | 8 | Alex Bowman | 2,295 (–2,705) |
| 4 | 9 | Denny Hamlin | 2,293 (–2,707) |
| | 10 | Martin Truex Jr. | 2,226 (–2,774) |
| | 11 | Austin Cindric | 2,222 (–2,778) |
| | 12 | Daniel Suárez | 2,199 (–2,801) |
| 1 | 13 | Brad Keselowski | 2,186 (–2,814) |
| 1 | 14 | Chase Briscoe | 2,176 (–2,824) |
| 2 | 15 | Ty Gibbs | 2,168 (–2,832) |
| | 16 | Harrison Burton | 2,101 (–2,899) |
Official driver's standings

Manufacturers' Championship standings

| Pos | Manufacturer | Points |
|---|---|---|
| 1 | Chevrolet | 1,275 |
| 2 | Ford | 1,235 (–40) |
| 3 | Toyota | 1,226 (–49) |

- Note: Only the first 16 positions are included for the driver standings.

== Notes ==
| Previous race: 2024 Straight Talk Wireless 400 | NASCAR Cup Series; 2024 season | Next race: 2024 NASCAR Cup Series Championship Race |
