= MadHouse (TV series) =

- Genre: Reality
- Created by: Grant Kahler
- Starring: Junior Miller; Tim Brown; Burt Myers; Jason Myers; Chris Fleming; Jonathan Brown; Austin Pack; Gene Pack; Gray Garrison
- Country of origin: United States
- Original language: English
- No. of seasons: 1
- No. of episodes: 13

Production
- Producer: Triage Entertainment
- Running time: 43 minutes

Original release
- Network: History Channel
- Release: January 10 – March 19, 2010

MadHouse is an American television series that aired on the History Channel in 2010. It follows four teams of Modified class race car drivers through the 2009 season at Bowman Gray Stadium. The Modified Division is NASCAR's oldest division, and while the Northeast is the most popular region for this class of motorsport (NASCAR Hall of Fame member Richie Evans from Rome, NY, was a nine time Modified Division champion and won the inaugural touring series championship for Modifieds), it is a fan favorite at the Piedmont Triad's quarter-mile speedway.

Junior Miller, Tim "The Rocket" Brown, Burt and Jason Myers and Chris Fleming are the five drivers who are followed throughout the series. Later drivers Jonathan "Jon Boy" Brown, Austin Pack, and Gene Pack are introduced to the audience.

== Episodes ==
Episode #	Title	Original Air Date	Short Summary
1	Madhouse	January 10, 2010	A reality series following auto racers in Winston-Salem, N.C., during a racing season focuses on two feuding families who settle their differences on the racetrack. The opener introduces the four main racers and recaps the previous racing season.
2	Down with the King	January 17, 2010	Junior crashes and worries that his eyesight is failing; Tim throws a surprise party for his wife's birthday; and Chris decides to purchase a new pair of shocks.
3	Full Moon Madness	January 24, 2010	Tim Brown plans his strategy after losing to Burt; Jason and Burt reminisce about their grandfather's fatal crash.
4	Brother Against Brother	January 31, 2010	Jason's tired of the bullying from Junior Miller, and he decides that it's time to stand up to him; and Chris asks for advice from a local legend.
5	Vengeance is Mine	February 14, 2010	Junior wants revenge following the Myers victory, but his car has a water leak and may not be ready for the next race; and Chris Fleming causes a rift between two old friends.
6	Young Blood on the Track	February 21, 2010	Tim Brown is in the lead for the championship in mid-season; while Burt grows frustrated over persistent mechanical problems, but he hopes a double-points race will help him take the top spot.
7	Breaking Point	February 28, 2010	Burt and Jason repair damages their cars sustained in the previous race; and Melvin Swisher celebrates when rookie Jonathan Brown wins a race.
8	Wheels of Misfortune	March 7, 2010	Jason makes a tough choice between a race and his daughter's dance recital; and Junior takes his anger out on a rental trailer.
9	Lamb to the Slaughter	March 14, 2010	Burt has engine problems and Junior has health issues; a rookie's star is rising; and Tim Brown looks like he's poised to be the season champion.
10	The Rocket Explodes	March 21, 2010	Tim Brown makes rude comments to the crowd after a victory; and Chris Fleming has an accident that could end his racing career.
11	Out for Blood	March 28, 2010	Jonathan is frustrated by his sponsor's lack of support, and he tries to find needed resources to get his car in shape to compete against Burt and Tim.
12	Back in Black	April 4, 2010	Jonathan has a crisis after making enemies when he forces Tim and Burt to spin out; and deals with news of a recent tragedy.
13	Do or Die	April 11, 2010	In the first-season finale, Tim Brown seems poised to win his eighth championship, which would tie the track record; Jonathan considers racing on his own in the next season; and Jason thinks this could be his last season.

== Cancellation and possible return ==
In March 2010 The History Channel cancelled the show before the final episode of season one was aired. Subsequently, the producers of the show have indicated that there will be a season two and have been in negotiations with The Speed Channel and with The Discovery Channel as well as other yet unnamed networks about picking up Madhouse for the 2011 program line up. According to Triage Entertainment website they did have a film crew filming for a season two in mid-to-late 2010. As of December 2010 the only network that has been stated by Triage Entertainment to pick up the show has been Speed Channel but no official air date has been announced or whether the show will air as Madhouse or under a different show name. Set to air on Discovery Channel at 10 PM ET on October 29 of 2018, Race Night at Bowman Gray will be next reality show for the famous Bowman Gray Stadium.
