= Bebida Beverage Company =

Beverage company

- Koma Unwind Regular and Sugar Free 12 oz. cans
- Type: Public
- Traded as: Expert Market: BBDA
- ISIN: US07557Q4010
- Industry: Beverage
- Founded: May 27, 2003; 23 years ago
- Founder: Brian Weber
- Headquarters: Statesville, North Carolina, U.S.
- Area served: United States
- Products: Koma Unwind

Bebida Beverage Company is a company which manufactures Koma Unwind, a carbonated, berry flavored relaxation drink with melatonin, milk thistle, rose hips and valerian root as ingredients.

== Products ==
Koma Unwind is made in several varieties: Regular, Sugar Free, Zero, and Shots. Regular and Sugar Free come in 12 oz cans, and contain valerian root, rose hips, and melatonin. Zero contains a combination of valerian root, milk thistle, rose hips, vitamin B_{12}, chamomile, L-theanine and passion flower. In addition to Koma Unwinde, the company also makes Potencia Energy (drinks and shots), Relax 5 shots, and Piranha Water.

On June 6, 2013, Bloomberg Businessweek reported that Koma Unwind was one of the six biggest sellers in the relaxation beverage industry.

In March 2015 the Food and Drug Administration (FDA) issued a Warning Letter to Bebida over labeling and inclusion of the neurohormone melatonin. Melatonin can be included in supplements, but is not approved as a food additive, and is therefore considered an adulterant. The FDA contends that Koma is described as a supplement, but is sold and marketed as a beverage. As of August 13, 2015, the FDA has put a halt to selling Koma Unwind until the company fixes its labeling.

== Marketing ==
=== United States ===
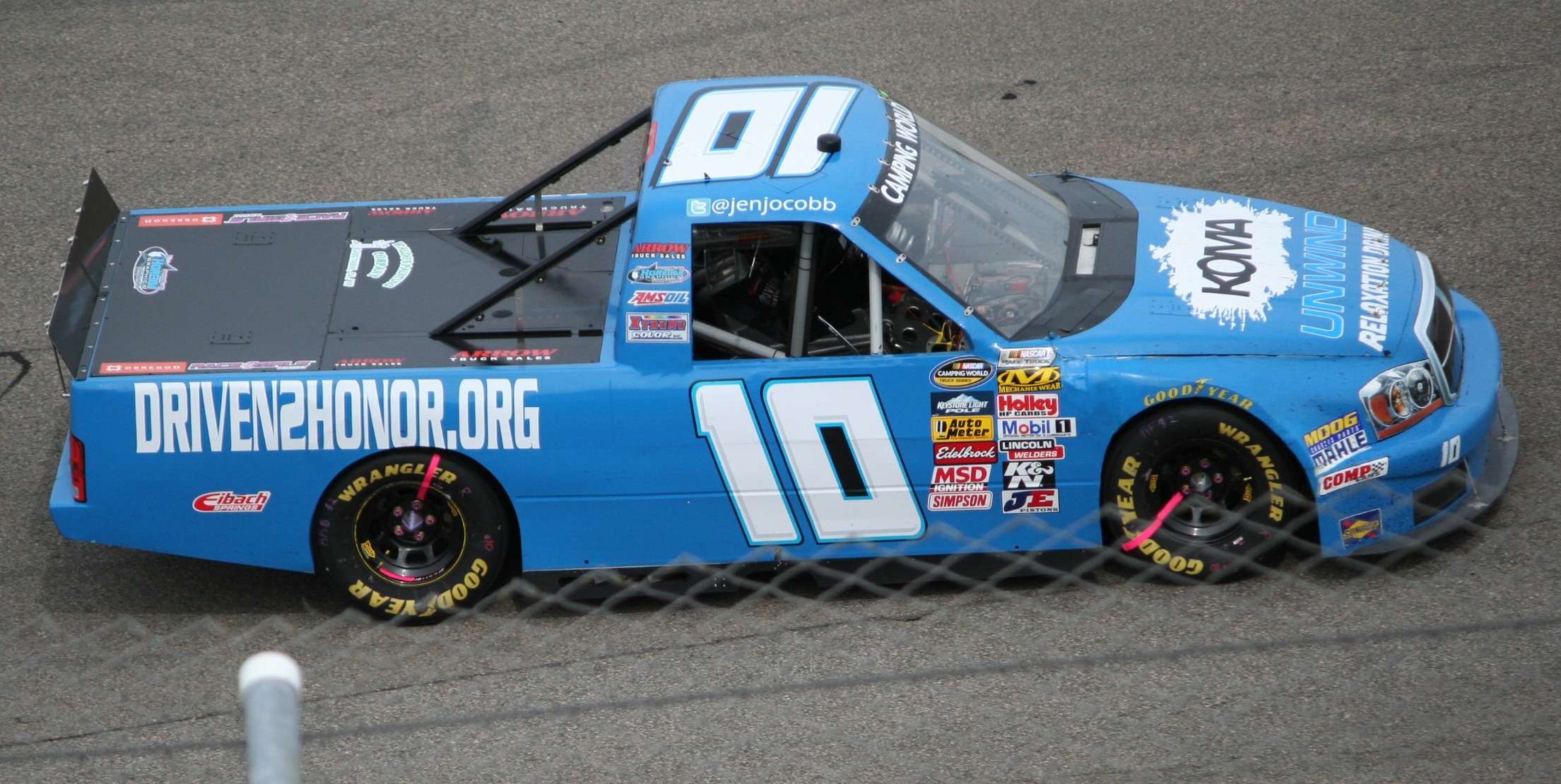
Jennifer Jo Cobb in the Koma Unwind No. 10 Chevrolet Silverado

Koma Unwind advertises in such sports such as NASCAR, hydroplane racing, and competitive fishing.

==== Stock car racing ====
In October 2009 Koma Unwind sponsored NASCAR Driver Steve Park in Camping World Truck race at Talladega, Alabama.

In 2011, Koma Unwind sponsored the Frank Stoddard-owned team for the Pure Michigan 400 at Michigan International Speedway with driver Ken Schrader. The company has also sponsored driver Jennifer Jo Cobb.

On February 19, 2013, Koma Unwind sponsored former two-time NASCAR Sprint Cup Series champion Terry Labonte at the helm for the Daytona 500. The event was the first time the product has backed Labonte.

The company is the sponsor of Koma Unwind Modified Madness Series, which began in 2014.

==== Hydroplane Racing ====
Koma Unwind was the primary sponsor of Shameless Racing, a hydroplane racing team, for the 2013 American Canadian Hydroplane Association season.

==== Pro Angler ====
Koma Unwind sponsored competitive fisher David Cooke for five events in 2013.
