= 2025 Cook Out Clash =

Non-points exhibition NASCAR race

Race details
- Race 1 of 2 exhibition races in the 2025 NASCAR Cup Series
- 2025 Cook Out Clash official program.
- Date: February 2, 2025
- Location: Bowman Gray Stadium in Winston-Salem, North Carolina
- Distance: 200 laps, 50.6 mi (81.4 km)
- Weather: Sunny with a temperature around 48 °F (9 °C).
- Average speed: 40.956 miles per hour (65.912 km/h)

Pole position
| Driver | Chase Elliott | Hendrick Motorsports |

Most laps led
| Driver | Chase Elliott | Hendrick Motorsports |
- Laps: 171

Winner
| No. 9 | Chase Elliott | Hendrick Motorsports |

Television in the United States
- Network: Fox
- Announcers: Mike Joy, Clint Bowyer, and Kevin Harvick
- Nielsen ratings: 1.55 (3.08 million)

Radio in the United States
- Radio: MRN
- Booth announcers: Alex Hayden and Mike Bagley
- Turn announcers: Dave Moody (Backstretch)

The 2025 Cook Out Clash was a non-championship exhibition NASCAR Cup Series race that was held on February 2, 2025, at Bowman Gray Stadium in Winston-Salem, North Carolina. Contested over 200 laps, it was the first exhibition race of the 2025 NASCAR Cup Series season.

== Report ==
=== Background ===
Bowman Gray Stadium, the layout of track where the race was held.

Bowman Gray Stadium is a NASCAR sanctioned 1/4-mile (0.40 km) asphalt flat oval short track and longstanding football stadium located in Winston-Salem, North Carolina. It is one of stock car racing's most legendary venues, and is referred to as "NASCAR's longest-running weekly race track". Bowman Gray Stadium is part of the Winston-Salem Sports and Entertainment Complex and is home of the Winston-Salem State University Rams football team. It was also the home of the Wake Forest University football team from 1956 until Groves Stadium (later BB&T Field) opened in 1968.

On August 17, 2024, NASCAR announced that the Clash would be moved to Bowman Gray Stadium, becoming the first NASCAR-sanctioned race at the track since 1971.

Scrutineering took place at Charlotte Motor Speedway on January 30. Post-race inspection would take place in both Winston-Salem and also at NASCAR facilities in Charlotte.

==== Entry list ====
- (R) denotes rookie driver.
- (i) denotes driver who is ineligible for series driver points.

| No. | Driver | Team | Manufacturer |
|---|---|---|---|
| 1 | Ross Chastain | Trackhouse Racing | Chevrolet |
| 2 | Austin Cindric | Team Penske | Ford |
| 3 | Austin Dillon | Richard Childress Racing | Chevrolet |
| 4 | Noah Gragson | Front Row Motorsports | Ford |
| 5 | Kyle Larson | Hendrick Motorsports | Chevrolet |
| 6 | Brad Keselowski | RFK Racing | Ford |
| 7 | Justin Haley | Spire Motorsports | Chevrolet |
| 8 | Kyle Busch | Richard Childress Racing | Chevrolet |
| 9 | Chase Elliott | Hendrick Motorsports | Chevrolet |
| 10 | Ty Dillon | Kaulig Racing | Chevrolet |
| 11 | Denny Hamlin | Joe Gibbs Racing | Toyota |
| 12 | Ryan Blaney | Team Penske | Ford |
| 15 | Tim Brown | Rick Ware Racing | Ford |
| 16 | A. J. Allmendinger | Kaulig Racing | Chevrolet |
| 17 | Chris Buescher | RFK Racing | Ford |
| 19 | Chase Briscoe | Joe Gibbs Racing | Toyota |
| 20 | Christopher Bell | Joe Gibbs Racing | Toyota |
| 21 | Josh Berry | Wood Brothers Racing | Ford |
| 22 | Joey Logano | Team Penske | Ford |
| 23 | Bubba Wallace | 23XI Racing | Toyota |
| 24 | William Byron | Hendrick Motorsports | Chevrolet |
| 34 | Todd Gilliland | Front Row Motorsports | Ford |
| 35 | Riley Herbst (R) | 23XI Racing | Toyota |
| 38 | Zane Smith | Front Row Motorsports | Ford |
| 41 | Cole Custer | Haas Factory Team | Ford |
| 42 | John Hunter Nemechek | Legacy Motor Club | Toyota |
| 43 | Erik Jones | Legacy Motor Club | Toyota |
| 45 | Tyler Reddick | 23XI Racing | Toyota |
| 47 | Ricky Stenhouse Jr. | Hyak Motorsports | Chevrolet |
| 48 | Alex Bowman | Hendrick Motorsports | Chevrolet |
| 50 | Burt Myers | Team AmeriVet | Chevrolet |
| 51 | Cody Ware | Rick Ware Racing | Ford |
| 54 | Ty Gibbs | Joe Gibbs Racing | Toyota |
| 60 | Ryan Preece | RFK Racing | Ford |
| 66 | Garrett Smithley (i) | Garage 66 | Ford |
| 71 | Michael McDowell | Spire Motorsports | Chevrolet |
| 77 | Carson Hocevar | Spire Motorsports | Chevrolet |
| 88 | Shane van Gisbergen (R) | Trackhouse Racing | Chevrolet |
| 99 | Daniel Suárez | Trackhouse Racing | Chevrolet |
Official entry list

== Practice ==
Ty Gibbs was the fastest in the practice session with a time of 14.019 with an average speed of 64.199 mph (103.318 km/h).

=== Practice results ===
| Pos | No. | Driver | Team | Manufacturer | Time | Speed |
|---|---|---|---|---|---|---|
| 1 | 54 | Ty Gibbs | Joe Gibbs Racing | Toyota | 14.019 | 64.199 |
| 2 | 60 | Ryan Preece | RFK Racing | Ford | 14.133 | 63.681 |
| 3 | 10 | Ty Dillon | Kaulig Racing | Chevrolet | 14.172 | 63.506 |
Official practice results

== Qualifying ==
Chase Elliott scored the pole for the first heat race with a time of 14.115 and a speed of 63.762 mph (102.615 km/h).

=== Qualifying results ===
| Pos | No. | Driver | Team | Manufacturer | Time |
|---|---|---|---|---|---|
| 1 | 9 | Chase Elliott | Hendrick Motorsports | Chevrolet | 14.115 |
| 2 | 17 | Chris Buescher | RFK Racing | Ford | 14.146 |
| 3 | 11 | Denny Hamlin | Joe Gibbs Racing | Toyota | 14.151 |
| 4 | 45 | Tyler Reddick | 23XI Racing | Toyota | 14.163 |
| 5 | 6 | Brad Keselowski | RFK Racing | Ford | 14.170 |
| 6 | 19 | Chase Briscoe | Joe Gibbs Racing | Toyota | 14.173 |
| 7 | 22 | Joey Logano | Team Penske | Ford | 14.194 |
| 8 | 20 | Christopher Bell | Joe Gibbs Racing | Toyota | 14.194 |
| 9 | 12 | Ryan Blaney | Team Penske | Ford | 14.215 |
| 10 | 88 | Shane van Gisbergen (R) | Trackhouse Racing | Chevrolet | 14.217 |
| 11 | 24 | William Byron | Hendrick Motorsports | Chevrolet | 14.226 |
| 12 | 2 | Austin Cindric | Team Penske | Ford | 14.232 |
| 13 | 7 | Justin Haley | Spire Motorsports | Chevrolet | 14.236 |
| 14 | 38 | Zane Smith | Front Row Motorsports | Ford | 14.245 |
| 15 | 48 | Alex Bowman | Hendrick Motorsports | Chevrolet | 14.246 |
| 16 | 41 | Cole Custer | Haas Factory Team | Ford | 14.247 |
| 17 | 1 | Ross Chastain | Trackhouse Racing | Chevrolet | 14.248 |
| 18 | 23 | Bubba Wallace | 23XI Racing | Toyota | 14.261 |
| 19 | 77 | Carson Hocevar | Spire Motorsports | Chevrolet | 14.274 |
| 20 | 34 | Todd Gilliland | Front Row Motorsports | Ford | 14.281 |
| 21 | 21 | Josh Berry | Wood Brothers Racing | Ford | 14.283 |
| 22 | 5 | Kyle Larson | Hendrick Motorsports | Chevrolet | 14.285 |
| 23 | 54 | Ty Gibbs | Joe Gibbs Racing | Toyota | 14.287 |
| 24 | 60 | Ryan Preece | RFK Racing | Ford | 14.287 |
| 25 | 4 | Noah Gragson | Front Row Motorsports | Ford | 14.292 |
| 26 | 99 | Daniel Suárez | Trackhouse Racing | Chevrolet | 14.294 |
| 27 | 47 | Ricky Stenhouse Jr. | Hyak Motorsports | Chevrolet | 14.318 |
| 28 | 16 | A. J. Allmendinger | Kaulig Racing | Chevrolet | 14.318 |
| 29 | 8 | Kyle Busch | Richard Childress Racing | Chevrolet | 14.319 |
| 30 | 43 | Erik Jones | Legacy Motor Club | Toyota | 14.335 |
| 31 | 35 | Riley Herbst (R) | 23XI Racing | Toyota | 14.338 |
| 32 | 42 | John Hunter Nemechek | Legacy Motor Club | Toyota | 14.362 |
| 33 | 3 | Austin Dillon | Richard Childress Racing | Chevrolet | 14.382 |
| 34 | 51 | Cody Ware | Rick Ware Racing | Ford | 14.401 |
| 35 | 15 | Tim Brown | Rick Ware Racing | Ford | 14.446 |
| 36 | 71 | Michael McDowell | Spire Motorsports | Chevrolet | 14.468 |
| 37 | 10 | Ty Dillon | Kaulig Racing | Chevrolet | 14.593 |
| 38 | 66 | Garrett Smithley (i) | MBM Motorsports | Ford | 14.602 |
| 39 | 50 | Burt Myers | Team AmeriVet | Chevrolet | 14.604 |
Official qualifying results

== Qualifying heat races ==
Chase Elliott scored the pole for the race after winning the first qualifying heat race.

=== Race 1 ===
| Pos | Grid | No | Driver | Team | Manufacturer | Laps |
|---|---|---|---|---|---|---|
| 1 | 1 | 9 | Chase Elliott | Hendrick Motorsports | Chevrolet | 25 |
| 2 | 2 | 6 | Brad Keselowski | RFK Racing | Ford | 25 |
| 3 | 7 | 4 | Noah Gragson | Front Row Motorsports | Ford | 25 |
| 4 | 8 | 8 | Kyle Busch | Richard Childress Racing | Chevrolet | 25 |
| 5 | 5 | 1 | Ross Chastain | Trackhouse Racing | Chevrolet | 25 |
| 6 | 10 | 10 | Ty Dillon | Kaulig Racing | Chevrolet | 25 |
| 7 | 9 | 3 | Austin Dillon | Richard Childress Racing | Chevrolet | 25 |
| 8 | 6 | 21 | Josh Berry | Wood Brothers Racing | Ford | 25 |
| 9 | 4 | 7 | Justin Haley | Spire Motorsports | Chevrolet | 25 |
| 10 | 3 | 12 | Ryan Blaney | Team Penske | Ford | 25 |
Official heat race 1 results

=== Race 2 ===
| Pos | Grid | No | Driver | Team | Manufacturer | Laps |
|---|---|---|---|---|---|---|
| 1 | 1 | 17 | Chris Buescher | RFK Racing | Ford | 25 |
| 2 | 2 | 19 | Chase Briscoe | Joe Gibbs Racing | Toyota | 25 |
| 3 | 3 | 88 | Shane van Gisbergen (R) | Trackhouse Racing | Chevrolet | 25 |
| 4 | 5 | 23 | Bubba Wallace | 23XI Racing | Toyota | 25 |
| 5 | 7 | 99 | Daniel Suárez | Trackhouse Racing | Chevrolet | 25 |
| 6 | 8 | 43 | Erik Jones | Legacy Motor Club | Toyota | 25 |
| 7 | 4 | 38 | Zane Smith | Front Row Motorsports | Ford | 25 |
| 8 | 6 | 5 | Kyle Larson | Hendrick Motorsports | Chevrolet | 25 |
| 9 | 9 | 51 | Cody Ware | Rick Ware Racing | Ford | 25 |
| 10 | 10 | 66 | Garrett Smithley (i) | Garage 66 | Ford | 25 |
Official heat race 2 results

=== Race 3 ===
| Pos | Grid | No | Driver | Team | Manufacturer | Laps |
|---|---|---|---|---|---|---|
| 1 | 1 | 11 | Denny Hamlin | Joe Gibbs Racing | Toyota | 25 |
| 2 | 2 | 22 | Joey Logano | Team Penske | Ford | 25 |
| 3 | 3 | 24 | William Byron | Hendrick Motorsports | Chevrolet | 25 |
| 4 | 5 | 77 | Carson Hocevar | Spire Motorsports | Chevrolet | 25 |
| 5 | 4 | 48 | Alex Bowman | Hendrick Motorsports | Chevrolet | 25 |
| 6 | 6 | 54 | Ty Gibbs | Joe Gibbs Racing | Toyota | 25 |
| 7 | 8 | 35 | Riley Herbst (R) | 23XI Racing | Toyota | 25 |
| 8 | 7 | 47 | Ricky Stenhouse Jr. | Hyak Motorsports | Chevrolet | 25 |
| 9 | 10 | 50 | Burt Myers | Team AmeriVet | Chevrolet | 25 |
| 10 | 9 | 15 | Tim Brown | Rick Ware Racing | Ford | 24 |
Official heat race 3 results

=== Race 4 ===
| Pos | Grid | No | Driver | Team | Manufacturer | Laps |
|---|---|---|---|---|---|---|
| 1 | 1 | 45 | Tyler Reddick | 23XI Racing | Toyota | 25 |
| 2 | 2 | 20 | Christopher Bell | Joe Gibbs Racing | Toyota | 25 |
| 3 | 6 | 60 | Ryan Preece | RFK Racing | Ford | 25 |
| 4 | 3 | 2 | Austin Cindric | Team Penske | Ford | 25 |
| 5 | 5 | 34 | Todd Gilliland | Front Row Motorsports | Ford | 25 |
| 6 | 9 | 71 | Michael McDowell | Spire Motorsports | Chevrolet | 25 |
| 7 | 7 | 16 | A. J. Allmendinger | Kaulig Racing | Chevrolet | 25 |
| 8 | 8 | 42 | John Hunter Nemechek | Legacy Motor Club | Toyota | 25 |
| 9 | 4 | 41 | Cole Custer | Haas Factory Team | Ford | 25 |
Official heat race 4 results

=== B Main (Top two advance) ===
| Pos | Grid | No | Driver | Team | Manufacturer | Laps |
|---|---|---|---|---|---|---|
| 1 | 10 | 5 | Kyle Larson | Hendrick Motorsports | Chevrolet | 75 |
| 2 | 9 | 21 | Josh Berry | Wood Brothers Racing | Ford | 75 |
| 3 | 5 | 3 | Austin Dillon | Richard Childress Racing | Chevrolet | 75 |
| 4 | 12 | 42 | John Hunter Nemechek | Legacy Motor Club | Toyota | 75 |
| 5 | 4 | 71 | Michael McDowell | Spire Motorsports | Chevrolet | 75 |
| 6 | 6 | 38 | Zane Smith | Front Row Motorsports | Ford | 75 |
| 7 | 11 | 47 | Ricky Stenhouse Jr. | Hyak Motorsports | Chevrolet | 75 |
| 8 | 1 | 10 | Ty Dillon | Kaulig Racing | Chevrolet | 75 |
| 9 | 19 | 15 | Tim Brown | Rick Ware Racing | Ford | 75 |
| 10 | 14 | 51 | Cody Ware | Rick Ware Racing | Ford | 75 |
| 11 | 16 | 41 | Cole Custer | Haas Factory Team | Ford | 75 |
| 12 | 18 | 66 | Garrett Smithley (i) | Garage 66 | Ford | 75 |
| 13 | 13 | 7 | Justin Haley | Spire Motorsports | Chevrolet | 75 |
| 14 | 3 | 54 | Ty Gibbs | Joe Gibbs Racing | Toyota | 73 |
| 15 | 8 | 16 | A. J. Allmendinger | Kaulig Racing | Chevrolet | 68 |
| 16 | 2 | 43 | Erik Jones | Legacy Motor Club | Toyota | 65 |
| 17 | 7 | 35 | Riley Herbst (R) | 23XI Racing | Toyota | 65 |
| 18 | 15 | 50 | Burt Myers | Team AmeriVet | Chevrolet | 61 |
| 19 | 17 | 12 | Ryan Blaney | Team Penske | Ford | 23 |
Official last chance race results

NOTE: Blaney advances to feature on account of highest in 2024 championship points of all unqualified drivers.

=== Starting lineup ===
| Pos | No. | Driver | Team | Manufacturer |
|---|---|---|---|---|
| 1 | 9 | Chase Elliott | Hendrick Motorsports | Chevrolet |
| 2 | 17 | Chris Buescher | RFK Racing | Ford |
| 3 | 11 | Denny Hamlin | Joe Gibbs Racing | Toyota |
| 4 | 45 | Tyler Reddick | 23XI Racing | Toyota |
| 5 | 6 | Brad Keselowski | RFK Racing | Ford |
| 6 | 19 | Chase Briscoe | Joe Gibbs Racing | Toyota |
| 7 | 22 | Joey Logano | Team Penske | Ford |
| 8 | 20 | Christopher Bell | Joe Gibbs Racing | Toyota |
| 9 | 4 | Noah Gragson | Front Row Motorsports | Ford |
| 10 | 88 | Shane van Gisbergen (R) | Trackhouse Racing | Chevrolet |
| 11 | 24 | William Byron | Hendrick Motorsports | Chevrolet |
| 12 | 60 | Ryan Preece | RFK Racing | Ford |
| 13 | 8 | Kyle Busch | Richard Childress Racing | Chevrolet |
| 14 | 23 | Bubba Wallace | 23XI Racing | Toyota |
| 15 | 77 | Carson Hocevar | Spire Motorsports | Chevrolet |
| 16 | 2 | Austin Cindric | Team Penske | Ford |
| 17 | 1 | Ross Chastain | Trackhouse Racing | Chevrolet |
| 18 | 99 | Daniel Suárez | Trackhouse Racing | Chevrolet |
| 19 | 48 | Alex Bowman | Hendrick Motorsports | Chevrolet |
| 20 | 34 | Todd Gilliland | Front Row Motorsports | Ford |
| 21 | 5 | Kyle Larson | Hendrick Motorsports | Chevrolet |
| 22 | 21 | Josh Berry | Wood Brothers Racing | Ford |
| 23 | 12 | Ryan Blaney | Team Penske | Ford |
Official starting lineup

== Race ==
=== Race results ===
| Pos | Grid | No | Driver | Team | Manufacturer | Laps |
|---|---|---|---|---|---|---|
| 1 | 1 | 9 | Chase Elliott | Hendrick Motorsports | Chevrolet | 200 |
| 2 | 23 | 12 | Ryan Blaney | Team Penske | Ford | 200 |
| 3 | 3 | 11 | Denny Hamlin | Joe Gibbs Racing | Toyota | 200 |
| 4 | 7 | 22 | Joey Logano | Team Penske | Ford | 200 |
| 5 | 14 | 23 | Bubba Wallace | 23XI Racing | Toyota | 200 |
| 6 | 17 | 1 | Ross Chastain | Trackhouse Racing | Chevrolet | 200 |
| 7 | 16 | 2 | Austin Cindric | Team Penske | Ford | 200 |
| 8 | 4 | 45 | Tyler Reddick | 23XI Racing | Toyota | 200 |
| 9 | 10 | 88 | Shane van Gisbergen (R) | Trackhouse Racing | Chevrolet | 200 |
| 10 | 2 | 17 | Chris Buescher | RFK Racing | Ford | 200 |
| 11 | 12 | 60 | Ryan Preece | RFK Racing | Ford | 200 |
| 12 | 8 | 20 | Christopher Bell | Joe Gibbs Racing | Toyota | 199 |
| 13 | 22 | 21 | Josh Berry | Wood Brothers Racing | Ford | 199 |
| 14 | 20 | 34 | Todd Gilliland | Front Row Motorsports | Ford | 199 |
| 15 | 13 | 8 | Kyle Busch | Richard Childress Racing | Chevrolet | 199 |
| 16 | 15 | 77 | Carson Hocevar | Spire Motorsports | Chevrolet | 199 |
| 17 | 21 | 5 | Kyle Larson | Hendrick Motorsports | Chevrolet | 199 |
| 18 | 11 | 24 | William Byron | Hendrick Motorsports | Chevrolet | 199 |
| 19 | 19 | 48 | Alex Bowman | Hendrick Motorsports | Chevrolet | 199 |
| 20 | 9 | 4 | Noah Gragson | Front Row Motorsports | Ford | 199 |
| 21 | 5 | 6 | Brad Keselowski | RFK Racing | Ford | 199 |
| 22 | 18 | 99 | Daniel Suárez | Trackhouse Racing | Chevrolet | 198 |
| 23 | 6 | 19 | Chase Briscoe | Joe Gibbs Racing | Toyota | 120 |
Official race results

== Media ==
=== Television ===
Fox covered the race on the television side. Mike Joy, Clint Bowyer, and three-time Clash winner Kevin Harvick handled the call in the booth for the race. Jamie Little and Regan Smith handled the pit road duties, and Larry McReynolds provided insight on-site during the race.

Fox
| Booth announcers | Pit reporters | In-race analyst |
|---|---|---|
| Lap-by-lap: Mike Joy; Color-commentator: Clint Bowyer; Color-commentator: Kevin Harvick | Jamie Little; Regan Smith | Larry McReynolds |

=== Radio ===
MRN covered the radio call for the race, which was also simulcast on Sirius XM NASCAR Radio. Alex Hayden and Mike Bagley called the action from the broadcast booth when the field raced down the front straightaway. Lead Turn Announcer Dave Moody called the action for MRN when the field raced down the backstretch. Lead Pit Reporter for MRN Steve Post, Chris Wilner, Brienne Pedigo, and Jacklyn Drake covered the action for MRN on pit lane.

MRN Radio
| Booth announcers | Turn announcers | Pit reporters |
|---|---|---|
| Lead announcer: Alex Hayden; Announcer: Mike Bagley | Backstretch: Dave Moody | Steve Post; Chris Wilner; Brienne Pedigo; Jacklyn Drake |
