= Bowman Gray Stadium =

Multi-use sports facility

The Madhouse

- Auto racing oval (1939–present)
- Location: 1250 South Martin Luther King Drive; Winston-Salem, North Carolina
- Coordinates: 36°4′58″N 80°13′20″W
- Capacity: 17,000
- Owner: City of Winston-Salem (1938–present)
- Operator: NASCAR (auto racing); Winston-Salem State University (gridiron football)
- Broke ground: February 23, 1937; 89 years ago
- Opened: May 1, 1938; 88 years ago
- Major events: Current: NASCAR Cup Series; Cook Out Clash (2025–2026); Myers Brothers 250 (1958–1971); Future: NASCAR Truck Series; NASCAR Truck Series at Bowman Gray Stadium (2027)
- Website: bowmangrayracing.com

Oval (1937–present)
- Surface: Asphalt
- Length: 0.250 mi (0.402 km)
- Turns: 4
- Race lap record: 0:14.161 ( (United States) Chase Elliott, Chevrolet Camaro ZL1, 2025, NASCAR Cup)
Bowman Gray Stadium
- Interactive map of Bowman Gray Stadium
- Surface: Grass
Tenants
- Winston-Salem State Rams (NCAA) (1956–present); Wake Forest Demon Deacons (NCAA) (1956–1967)

Bowman Gray Stadium is a multi-use sports facility in Winston-Salem, North Carolina. The complex consists of a 0.250 mi (0.402 km) paved oval short track and a gridiron football field. The complex has held various events since its opening in 1938, including motorsports events sanctioned by NASCAR and college football games for the Wake Forest Demon Deacons and the Winston-Salem State Rams. Bowman Gray Stadium is owned by the city of Winston-Salem and operated by both NASCAR and Winston-Salem State University for events.

Built during the Great Depression, Bowman Gray Stadium opened in 1938, hosting football games and festivals in its first year. Auto racing made its first appearance the year after. After a short-lived attempt, racing was revived in 1947 when the dirt track around the football field was paved under promoter Lou Franco. Two years later, businessmen Bill France Sr. and Alvin Hawkins took over the stadium's racing promotions under the sanctioning body of NASCAR, with racing becoming a mainstay after NASCAR's rise in popularity. Over the following decades, the stadium's condition declined steadily. In 1990s and 2000s, a series of renovations were made to the stadium, improving its amenities and condition. In the 2020s, further renovations to the stadium were made, leading to the return of the NASCAR Cup Series after over 50 years of absence.

== Description ==
=== Amenities ===
Bowman Gray Stadium (BGS) is located in Winston-Salem, North Carolina, and served by U.S. Route 52 and U.S. Route 421. As of 2024, the stadium has a capacity of 17,000 according to The Athletic. The stadium's football field, currently named the "Bill Hayes Field" in honor of former Winston-Salem State football coach Bill Hayes, is made out of grass according to the Winston-Salem Journal.

=== Racetrack configuration ===
The racing track in its current form is measured at 0.25 mi (0.40 km) with completely flat banking throughout the track.

== Stadium history ==
=== Early years ===
==== Planning and construction ====
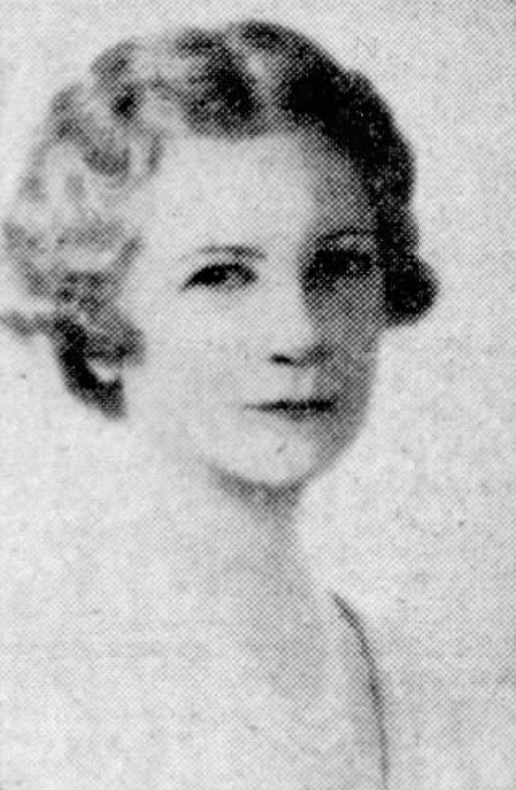
Nathalie Gray Bernard (pictured in 1943), the widow of Bowman Gray Sr., partially funded the construction of Bowman Gray Stadium.

In November 1936 and in the midst of the Great Depression, plans were filed by Winston-Salem, North Carolina, mayor W. T. Wilson to the Works Progress Administration (WPA) for a potential 10,000-seat, $100,000 (adjusted for inflation, $2,000,000) horseshoe stadium funded by the city and Nathalie Gray Bernard, the widow of Bowman Gray Sr. who was a former president of the R. J. Reynolds Tobacco Company. The project was approved by the state WPA branch within the month; however, work on the project was delayed until the following year for the United States Congress to finalize funding for the WPA's 1937 budget. In January 1937, further plans were released for the facility, with the full stadium plans revealed to be a 11,500-seat football stadium on a 42-acre (17 ha) plot of land.

After Gray promised to invest $35,000 (adjusted for inflation, $784,000) into the project, the WPA approved the project in February. Construction began on the now-named "Bowman Gray Stadium" (BGS) on February 23, with an initial scheduled completion date of June 30. However, by July, although "steady progress" was made, only parts of the grandstand were completed. In August, $54,000 in additional funding was approved to expand parking space and add other amenities to the stadium. By January 1938, all major construction work was completed on the stadium. Within the month, the first event for the facility was announced: a gridiron football game between the Duke Blue Devils and the Wake Forest Demon Deacons in October of that year. In March, the stadium itself was completed. At the end of the stadium's construction, the project costed $200,000 (adjusted for inflation, $4,600,000), twice over the original budget.

==== First events and short-lived auto racing promotions ====
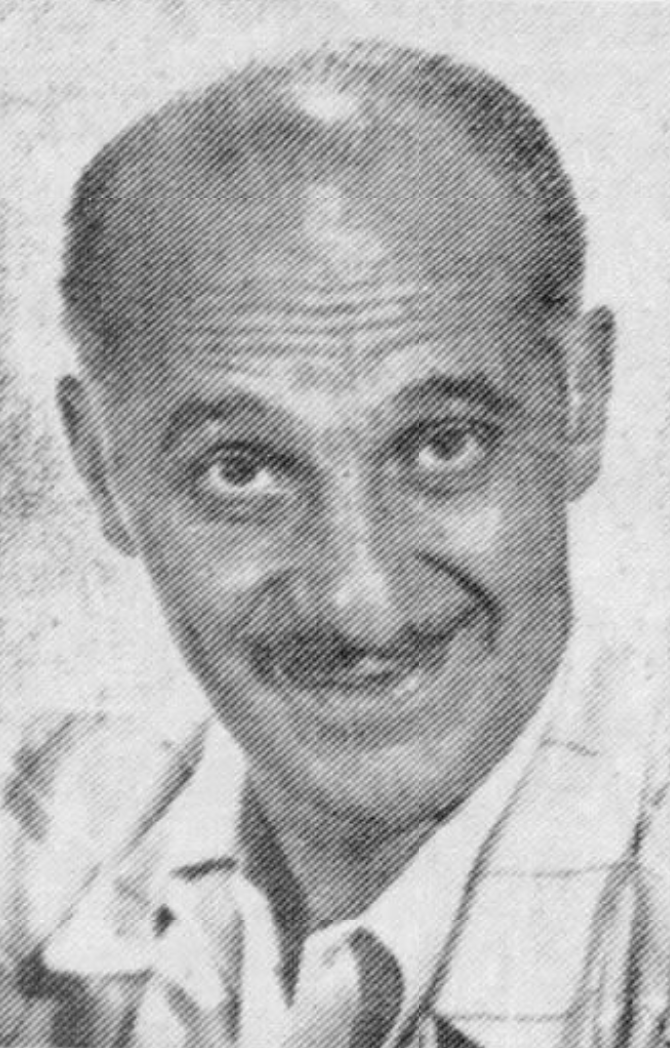
Lou Franco (pictured in 1947) and his company National Sports Syndicate organized the first paved auto races at Bowman Gray Stadium in 1947. Franco's tenure was short; he failed to pay debts to the city of Winston-Salem and eventually fled the city.

BGS officially opened on May 1, 1938, for a Christian music festival. The first college football game occurred on October 22 of that year, with Duke winning against Wake Forest in a 7-0 score. The first auto racing events, a midget car program organized by promoter J. C. Calhoun, occurred a year later on September 1 on a dirt track surrounding the football field, with the first race being won by Johnny Wohlfiel. In 1947, another set of midget programs were scheduled and organized by a group named the National Sports Syndicate (NSS) and its director Lou Franco. Under NSS' control, an agreement between the city and Franco was made to pave the dirt track and set up with protective guardrail by June. Both the races and Franco received heavy scrutiny for lackluster attendance and a lack of safety measures leading to accidents causing severe injuries, including a crash that killed driver Bernie Fox. In August, with Franco facing a combined debt of approximately $1,400 (adjusted for inflation, $20,200) to multiple companies, he left the city, failing to pay any of his debts. Four months later, the city was reported to have lost $1,700 from NSS failing to pay rent.

==== France Sr.–Hawkins partnership, subsequent financial recovery ====
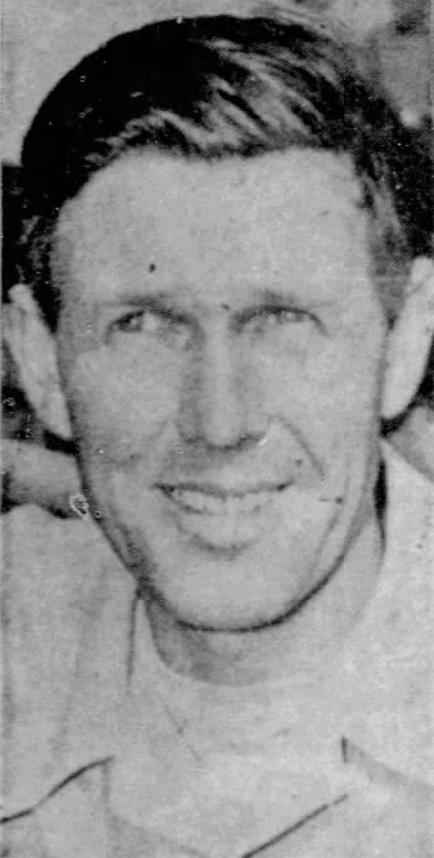
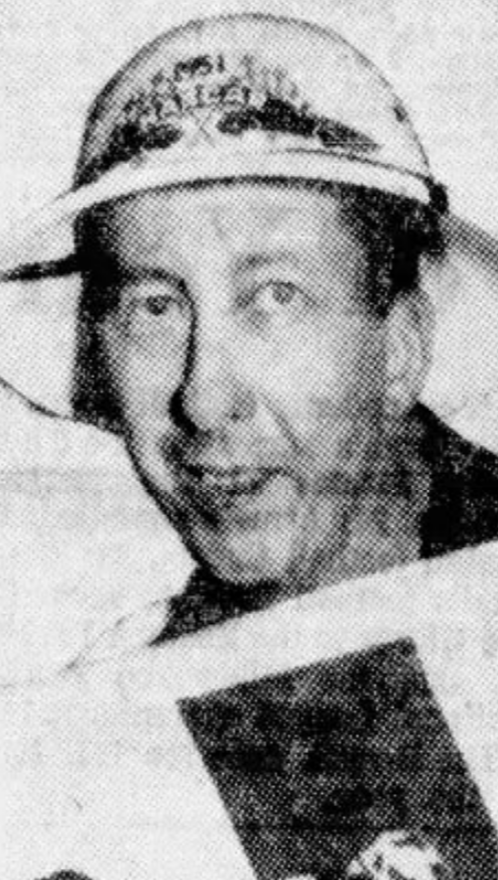
In 1949, NASCAR founder Bill France Sr. (left) and promoter Alvin Hawkins (right) took over BGS' auto racing lease. The duo's races were successful, and Hawkins and his descendants continued to lease the track until 2024.

After a brief auto racing period under promoter Red Crise that also failed due to low attendance, in 1949, racing promoters Bill France Sr. and Alvin Hawkins took over the stadium's racing lease to host stock car races under the newly formed sanctioning body of NASCAR. In a 1956 Twin City Sentinel interview, Hawkins stated that France Sr. was hesitant to host races at the stadium until he convinced him otherwise. As part of the agreement, they agreed to pay off Franco's debts for paving the track according to former BGS publicist Hank Schoolfield. The duo's programs were successful in their first year, and they agreed to continue their lease for the following year. In 1950, driver William Justice was burned to death in a crash, becoming the stadium's second fatality. Due to Justice's death, BGS mandated fuel cells in order to prevent fires. By the fourth year of the duo's tenure, with auto races becoming increasingly popular, BGS was able to get out of financial debt and "white elephant" status, earning increasing annual profits and making subsequent renovations to the stadium's scoreboard and lighting system. In 1954, expansions were made to the stadium's field house and seating capacity at a cost of approximately $100,000, in the process increasing capacity to 17,970. In 1958, the stadium experienced its third fatality after driver Billy Myers collapsed during a race, most likely dying from a heart attack.

=== Slow period of improvements, brief Cup Series period, first failed WSSU sale proposal ===
BGS hosted its first NASCAR Cup Series race on May 24, 1958, with Bob Welborn winning the event. In 1966, the oval track was repaved with a "slight banking"; the first complete repave since the track's initial paving. Starting in the early 1970s, BGS racing officials briefly hosted motorcycle races on a temporary sand and dirt surface that was placed on top of the paved track surface. In 1971, the racing oval hosted its last Cup Series race at the stadium until 2025. The race ended with winner Bobby Allison being disqualified for running a smaller Grand American car instead of a larger Grand National car despite the race being a "combination" race where both styles of cars could compete. The decision stood until 2024 when NASCAR awarded the victory back to Allison. Two years later, the track was again completely repaved, this time with widened turn exits and straightaways.

By 1978, the stadium's condition was declining. In a Winston-Salem Journal interview, Alvin Hawkins' son who took over auto racing promoting duties after Alvin's death, Joe, stated that after former track general manager Ivan Basch's departure in 1967, "it's just kinda hard to get [the city] to do anything at the stadium anymore." In 1979, Winston-Salem State University (WSSU) chancellor Douglas Covington expressed interest at purchasing the stadium for $125,000, with support coming from the city's Recreation and Parks Commission. The following year, WSSU increased their offer to $450,000 in the wake of the city investing $100,000 in renovations; however, the vote for approval of the purchase from the city's board of aldermen was delayed extensively and eventually died due to a lack of support from the board.

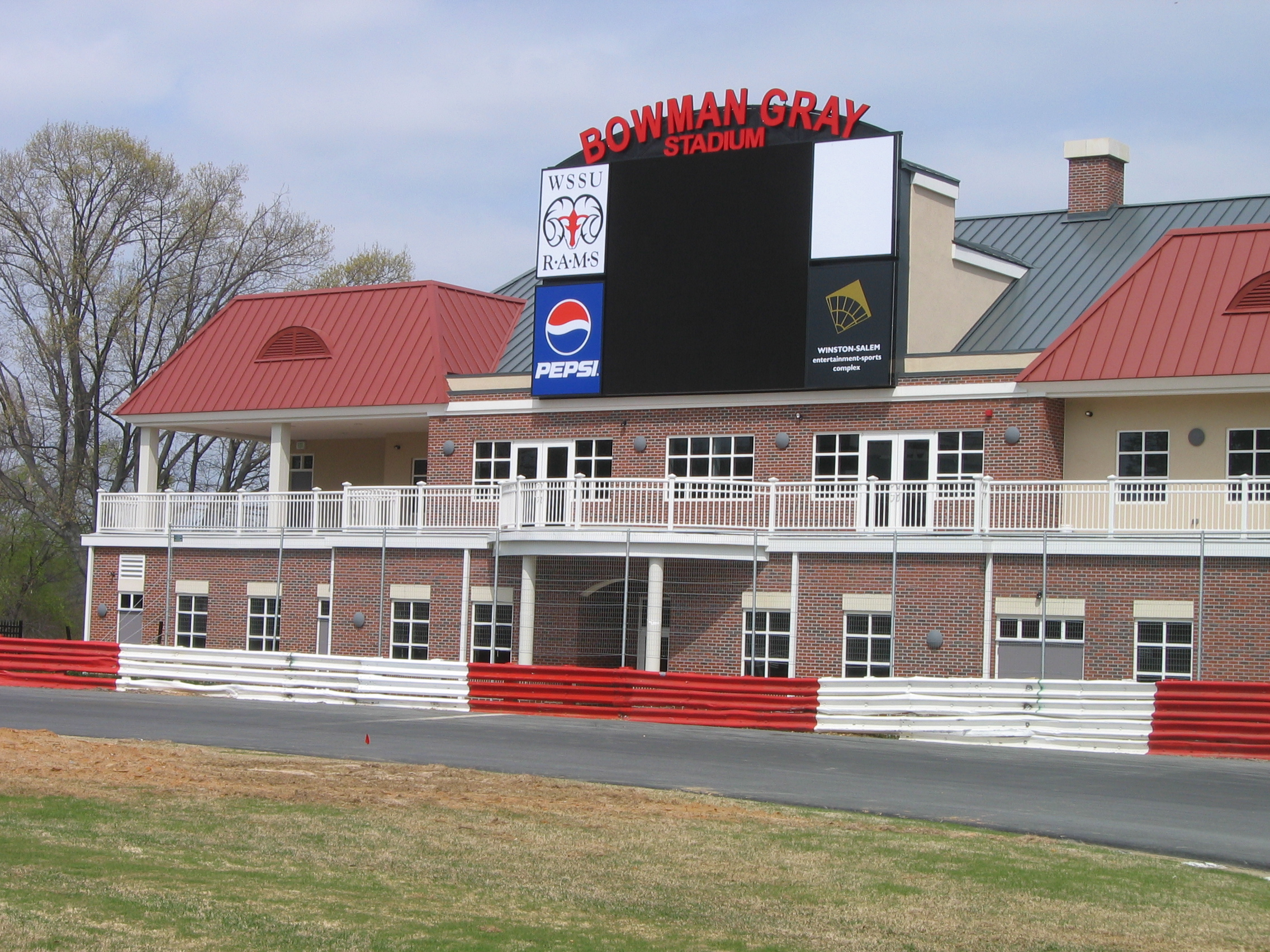
BGS' fieldhouse in 2008. The fieldhouse was built and finished the year prior after efforts from WSSU athletic director Percy Caldwell to build a new fieldhouse.

In 1997, the city of Winston-Salem proposed to invest $1.15 million in bonds to renovate the stadium by the raising of taxes. However, the plan was killed in a vote amongst the city's residents. Two years later, the city pushed efforts to rebuild the stadium's press box, which was infested with termites; the plans were approved in October of that year. In 2001, WSSU athletic director Percy Caldwell began negotiating with the city to renovate the stadium's field house. After four years, the renovation was approved. After a year in delays, the old field house was demolished in April 2006, with construction on the new field house starting four months later. The $5.1 million, 21,000 sq ft (2,000 m^{2}) field house was completed in late 2007, which included a new scoreboard.

=== Second failed WSSU sale, renovations, return of NASCAR Cup Series ===
With the city of Winston-Salem facing heavy budget deficits in the early 2010s, plans were first drafted in March 2012 to sell Bowman Gray Stadium to WSSU. WSSU initially attempted to borrow $7.5 million from the North Carolina state government in order to purchase the facility, but it was rejected by state lawmakers in June. WSSU again attempted to place efforts into purchasing the stadium in the following year with additional support from NASCAR team owner Richard Childress. With the purchase price of $7.1 million being set, the sale was proposed to the North Carolina General Assembly under bill S.B. 480. The General Assembly approved S.B. 480 on July 26. However, by April 2014, "no firm word" was given on when the university would officially purchase the stadium, with city officials waiting for a state estimate. After a state approval on a price of $7.3 million in June, news on the potential sale stayed largely dormant until 2017, when it was revealed that the purchase was awaiting environmental approval from the state's Department of Environmental Quality.

In November 2018, Winston-Salem city officials announced a $9 million renovation project focusing on the resurfacing of the auto racing track and other improvements to stadium amenities, in the process keeping the site under the city's control; by this point, WSSU officials pulled out of purchasing the facility. The plan was approved by the Winston-Salem City Council in April 2019, with construction starting on the project in November 2020, with the project now expanding to include the regrading of the stadium's football field. Both the repave and the regrading were completed in 2021, and the overall project was completed in April 2022. Within the month of April, an additional $530,020 grant was given from the North Carolina state government was awarded for additional renovations. Five months later, another repave of the track surface was made due after it experienced unusual levels of deterioration during the 2022 racing season.

In March 2024, the sanctioning body of NASCAR took over the auto racing operations lease from the Hawkins family-owned Winston-Salem Speedway, Inc., ending a 75-year lease. Five months after NASCAR's takeover, NASCAR executive vice president Ben Kennedy announced the Cup Series' return for 2025 to the facility, moving the exhibition and non-points paying race known as the Clash from the Los Angeles Memorial Coliseum to Bowman Gray Stadium. In preparation for the event, numerous renovations were made. By January 2025, a new lighting system was installed and the surrounding guardrails were removed and replaced by SAFER barriers and protective catchfence. The first Clash at the facility was run on February 2; the first Cup Series race at the stadium since 1971. In June 2025, the Winston-Salem City Council approved funding for a new $1,000,000 scoreboard if NASCAR continued to host any of its top three series at the facility over the following five years; the scoreboard, planned as a digital LED video board, was officially announced on December 8. On August 10, Robbie Brewer became the fifth driver to die at Bowman Gray Stadium after suffering a heart attack and slamming head-on into the outside barrier during a Sportsman division race; the first fatality at the track since driver Bubba Beck's death in 2002 after he also experienced a heart attack during a race.

== Events and uses ==
=== Sports ===
==== Auto racing ====
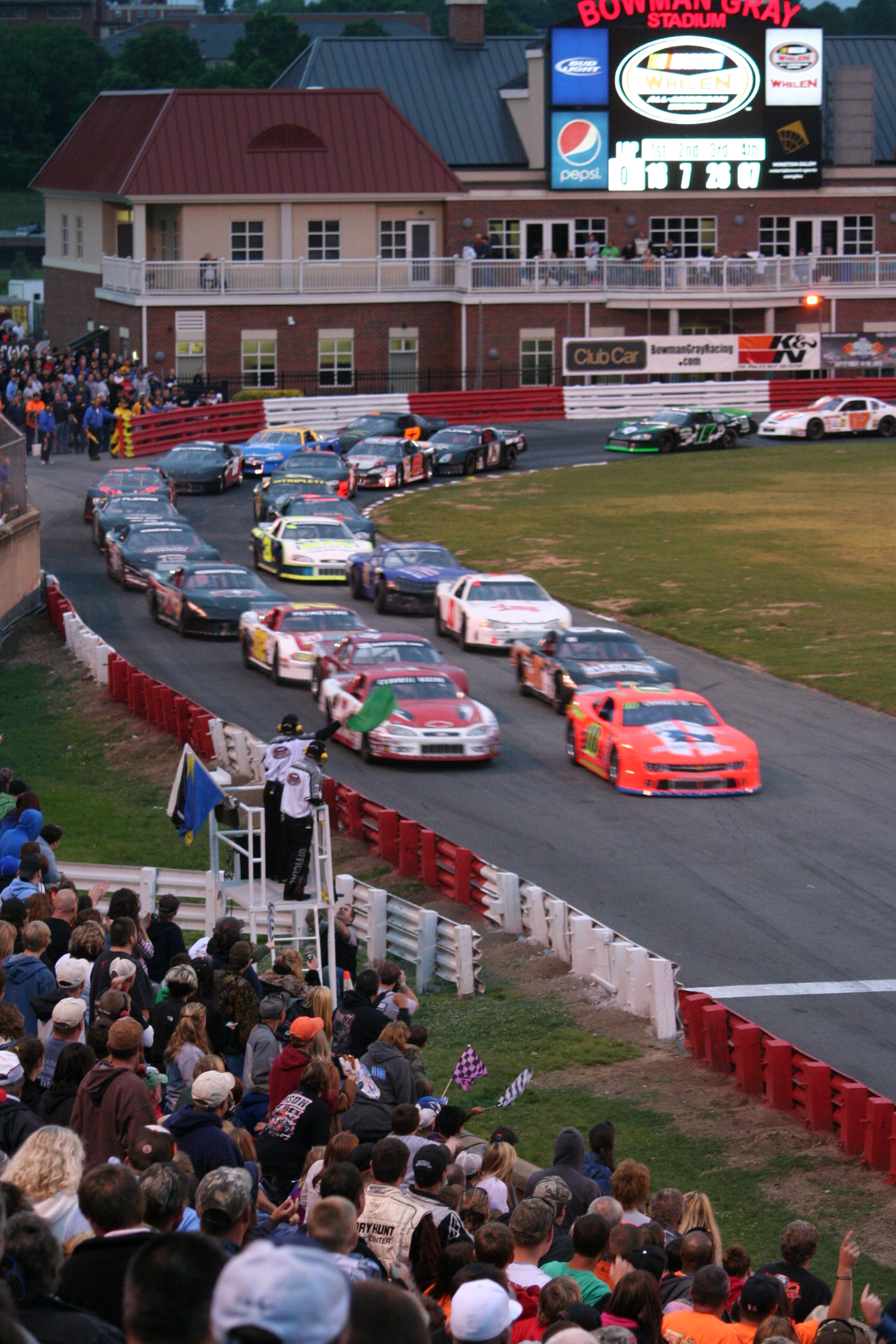
A local NASCAR Weekly Series race at Bowman Gray Stadium in 2011. Since 1949, the stadium's auto racing oval has held NASCAR-sanctioned events.

Bowman Gray Stadium's auto racing track formerly hosted the Clash, a NASCAR Cup Series exhibition and non-points paying event from 2025 to 2026. From 1958 until 1971, the track held points-paying Cup Series races. The stadium currently hosts local NASCAR Weekly Series races across four divisions, including modified, sportsman, street stock, and stadium stock. The weekly races are known for a wild and rowdy reputation, with fights amongst drivers being commonplace.

==== Gridiron football ====
BGS currently serves as the tenant for the Winston-Salem State Rams football team, with the university's lease running until 2037. The stadium previously hosted multiple tenants for gridiron football, including the collegiate Wake Forest Demon Deacons football team from 1956 to 1967 alongside several North Carolina high schools "from the early 1950s until 1994" according to the Winston-Salem Journal. From 1955 to 1960, the stadium hosted an annual National Football League (NFL) exhibition game between the Green Bay Packers and the Washington Redskins.

==== Other sports events ====
- In July 2023, BGS hosted its first baseball game, with the minor league team Carolina Disco Turkeys hosting as tenants.

=== Filming production ===
BGS has been featured in multiple television series. BGS and its NASCAR Weekly Series races were the focus of a 2010 History Channel mini-series titled MadHouse, airing for one 13-episode season. Another mini-series titled Race Night at Bowman Gray produced by the Discovery Channel was produced and released in 2018 for an eight-episode season; however, after three episodes were aired, the series was pulled from television broadcasts and moved to Discovery Channel's streaming app.
