= 1798 =

1798 in various calendars
- Gregorian calendar: 1798; MDCCXCVIII
- French Republican calendar: 6–7; VI–VII
- Ab urbe condita: 2551
- Armenian calendar: 1247; ԹՎ ՌՄԽԷ
- Assyrian calendar: 6548
- Balinese saka calendar: 1719–1720
- Bengali calendar: 1204–1205
- Berber calendar: 2748
- British Regnal year: 38 Geo. 3 – 39 Geo. 3
- Buddhist calendar: 2342
- Burmese calendar: 1160
- Byzantine calendar: 7306–7307
- Chinese calendar: 丁巳年 (Fire Snake); 4495 or 4288 — to — 戊午年 (Earth Horse); 4496 or 4289
- Coptic calendar: 1514–1515
- Discordian calendar: 2964
- Ethiopian calendar: 1790–1791
- Hebrew calendar: 5558–5559
- Hindu calendars
- Vikram Samvat: 1854–1855
- Shaka Samvat: 1719–1720
- Kali Yuga: 4898–4899
- Holocene calendar: 11798
- Igbo calendar: 798–799
- Iranian calendar: 1176–1177
- Islamic calendar: 1212–1213
- Japanese calendar: Kansei 10 (寛政１０年)
- Javanese calendar: 1724–1725
- Julian calendar: Gregorian minus 11 days
- Korean calendar: 4131
- Minguo calendar: 114 before ROC 民前114年
- Nanakshahi calendar: 330
- Thai solar calendar: 2340–2341
- Tibetan calendar: མེ་མོ་སྦྲུལ་ལོ་ (female Fire-Snake); 1924 or 1543 or 771 — to — ས་ཕོ་རྟ་ལོ་ (male Earth-Horse); 1925 or 1544 or 772

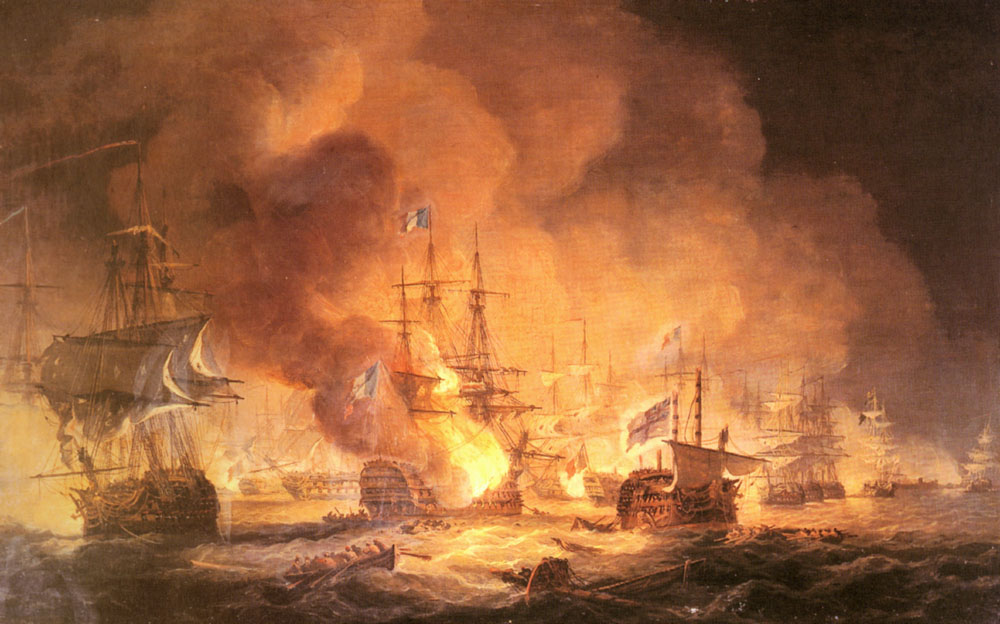
August 1: Britain's Royal Navy, led by Lord Nelson, defeats French in the Battle of the Nile.

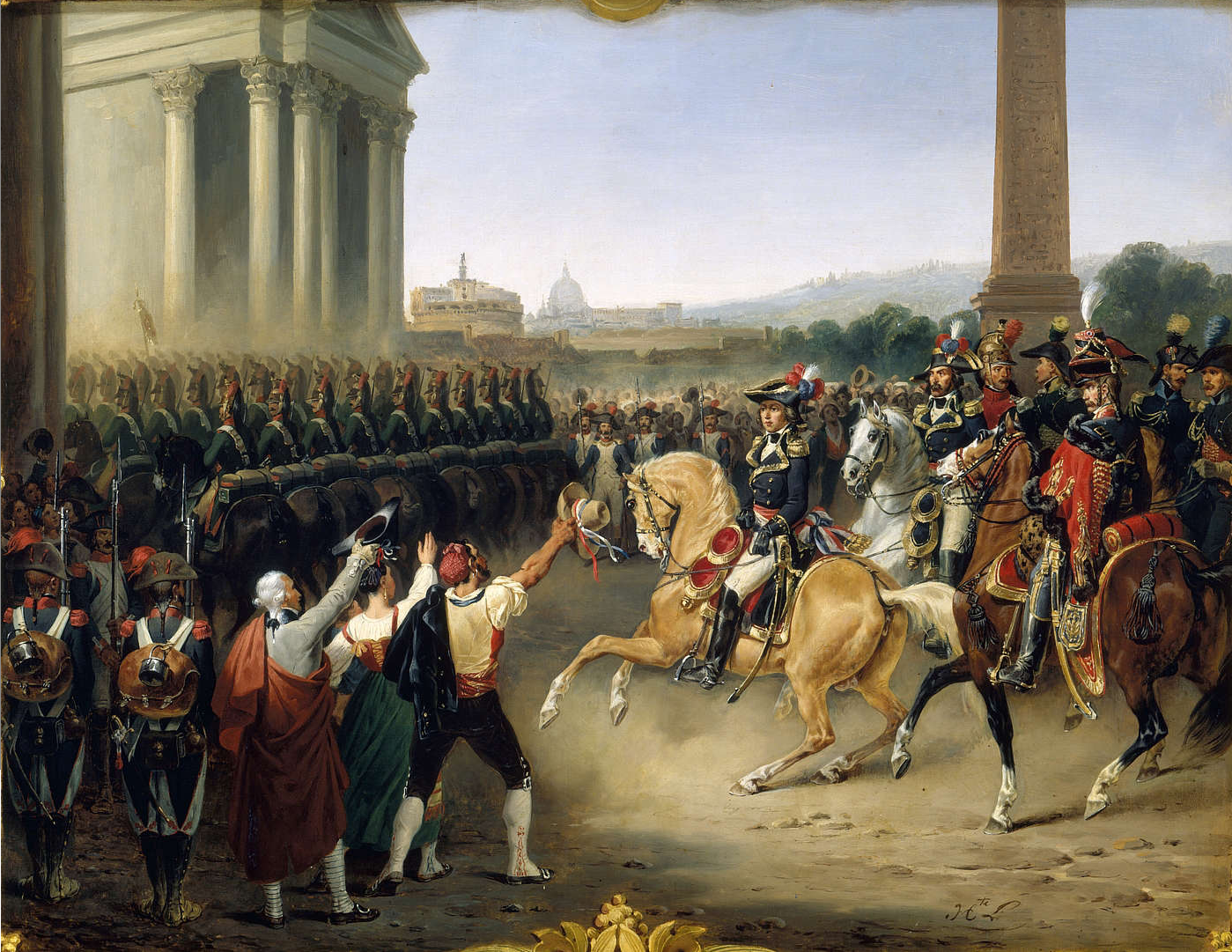
February 15: French troops enter Rome.

1798 (MDCCXCVIII) was a common year starting on Monday of the Gregorian calendar and a common year starting on Friday of the Julian calendar, the 1798th year of the Common Era (CE) and Anno Domini (AD) designations, the 798th year of the 2nd millennium, the 98th year of the 18th century, and the 9th year of the 1790s decade. As of the start of 1798, the Gregorian calendar was 11 days ahead of the Julian calendar, which remained in localized use until 1923.

== Events ==
=== January–June ===
- January – Eli Whitney contracts with the U.S. federal government for 10,000 muskets, which he produces with interchangeable parts.
- January 4 – Constantine Hangerli enters Bucharest, as Prince of Wallachia.
- January 22 – A coup d'état is staged in the Netherlands (Batavian Republic). Unitarian Democrat Pieter Vreede ends the power of the parliament (with a conservative-moderate majority).
- February 10 – The Pope is taken captive, and the Papacy is removed from power, by French General Louis-Alexandre Berthier.
- February 15 – U.S. Representative Roger Griswold (Fed-CT) beats Congressman Matthew Lyon (Dem-Rep-VT) with a cane, after the House declines to censure Lyon for earlier spitting in Griswold's face; the House declines to discipline either man.
- March – the Irish Rebellion of 1798 begins when the Irish Militia arrest the leadership of the Society of United Irishmen, a group unique amongst Irish republican and nationalist movements in that it unifies Catholics and Protestants (Anglican, Presbyterian, Methodist, Baptist and others) around republican ideals. This month, Lord Castlereagh is appointed Acting Chief Secretary for Ireland and on March 30 martial law is proclaimed here. The first battles in the rebellion are fought on May 24, and it continues through September, but the rebels receive much less than the expected support from France, which sends only 1,100 men.
- March 5 – French troops enter Bern.
- March 7 – French forces invade the Papal States and establish the Roman Republic.
- April 7 – The Mississippi Territory is organized by the United States, from territory ceded by Georgia and South Carolina; later it is twice expanded, to include disputed territory claimed by both the U.S. and Spain (which acquired territory in trade with Great Britain).
- April 12 – The Helvetic Republic, a French client republic, is proclaimed following the collapse of the Old Swiss Confederacy after the French invasion; Aarau becomes the republic's temporary capital.
- April 26 – France annexes Geneva.
- April 30 – The United States Department of the Navy is established as a cabinet-level department. Benjamin Stoddert, a civilian businessman, is appointed as the first Navy Secretary by President Adams.
- May 7 – French Revolutionary Wars: A French force attempting to dislodge a small British garrison on the Îles Saint-Marcouf is repulsed with heavy losses.
- May 9 – Napoleon sets off for Toulon, sailing aboard Vice-Admiral Brueys's flagship L'Orient; his squadron is part of a larger fleet of over 300 vessels, carrying almost 37,000 troops.
- May 27 – Pitt–Tierney duel takes place on Putney Heath. British Prime Minister William Pitt the Younger fights a duel against opposition politician George Tierney
- June 12
  - French invasion of Malta: French forces under Napoleon Bonaparte capture the island fortress of Malta on the way to Egypt.
  - A moderate coup d'état in the Netherlands (Batavian Republic) deposes Pieter Vreede.
- June 13 – Mission San Luis Rey de Francia is founded in California.
- June 18 – The first of the four Alien and Sedition Acts, the Naturalization Act of 1798, is signed into law by U.S. President Adams, requiring immigrants to wait 14 years rather than five years to become naturalized citizens of the United States. On June 25, another law is signed authorizing the imprisonment and deportation of any non-citizens deemed to be dangerous.

=== July–December ===
- July 1 – Egyptian Campaign: Napoleon Bonaparte disembarks his French army in Marabout Bay near Alexandria.
- July 7
  - Quasi-War: The United States Congress rescinds treaties with France, sparking the war.
  - In the action of USS Delaware vs La Croyable, the newly-formed United States Navy makes its first capture.
- July 11 – The United States Marine Corps is re-established under its present name.
- July 12 – Battle of Shubra Khit: French troops defeat the Mamelukes, during Napoleon's march from Alexandria to take Cairo.
- July 14 – The fourth of the Alien and Sedition Acts, the Sedition Act of 1798 is signed into law, making it a federal crime to write, publish, or utter false or malicious statements about the United States government.
- July 16 – The Relief of Sick and Disabled Seamen Act is signed into law, creating the Marine Hospital Service, the forerunner to the current United States Public Health Service Commissioned Corps.
- July 21 – Battle of the Pyramids: Napoleon Bonaparte defeats the Ottoman forces near the Pyramids. French forces claim control over Egypt's political center.
- July 24 – Napoleon Bonaparte enters Cairo. The occupation turns the campaign into an experiment in rule, science, and military control.
- July 31 – A second round of elections are held in the Netherlands (Batavian Republic); no general elections this time.
- August 1 – Battle of the Nile (near Abu Qir): Lord Nelson defeats the French navy under Admiral Brueys. 11 of the 13 French battleships are captured or destroyed, including the flagship Orient whose magazine explodes; Nelson himself is wounded in the head.
- August 22 – French troops land at Kilcummin in County Mayo to assist the Irish Rebellion.
- September – Charles Brockden Brown publishes the first significant American novel, the Gothic fiction Wieland: or, The Transformation; an American Tale.
- September 5 – Conscription is made mandatory in France by the Jourdan Law.
- September 10
  - The Piedmontese Republic is declared in the territory of Piedmont.
  - Battle of St. George's Caye: Off the coast of British Honduras (modern-day Belize), a group of European settlers and Africans defeats a Spanish force sent from Mexico to drive them out.
- September 18 – Lyrical Ballads is published anonymously by Samuel Taylor Coleridge and William Wordsworth, inaugurating the English Romantic movement in literature.
- September 23 – Battle of Killala: in the last land battle of the Irish Rebellion of 1798, British troops defeat the remaining rebel Irish and French forces at Killala.
- October 2 – The Cherokee nation signs a treaty with the United States allowing free passage through Cherokee lands in Tennessee through the Cumberland Gap through the Appalachian Mountains from Virginia into Kentucky.
- October 7 – U.S. Representative Matthew Lyon of Vermont becomes the first member of Congress to be put on trial for violating the new Sedition Act of 1798.
- October 12
  - Battle of Tory Island: A British Royal Navy squadron, under Sir John Borlase Warren, prevents French Republican ships, commanded by Jean-Baptiste-François Bompart, from landing reinforcements for the Society of United Irishmen on the County Donegal coast; Irish leader Wolfe Tone is captured and later dies of his wounds. This ends the Irish Rebellion of 1798.
  - Peasants War against the French occupiers of the Southern Netherlands begins in Overmere.
- October 21–22 – Revolt of Cairo: Napoleon Bonaparte suppresses a revolt in Cairo. French occupation survives but becomes more dependent on force and administration.
- October 22 – Capitulation of the French garrison at Hyderabad to East India Company troops under James Kirkpatrick, British Resident.
- October 23 – The Ottoman–Albanian forces of Ali Pasha of Janina defeat the French and capture the town of Preveza in the Battle of Nicopolis.
- October 25 – The Ottoman–Albanian forces of Ali Pasha of Janina capture Butrint from the French after a week-long siege.
- November 4 – The Russo-Ottoman siege of Corfu, held by the French, begins.
- November 8 – British whaler John Fearn becomes the first European to land on Nauru.
- November 28 – Trade between the United States and modern-day Uruguay begins when John Leamy's frigate John arrives in Montevideo.
- December 5 – Peasants War in the Southern Netherlands: The revolt is crushed in Hasselt; during the uprising it is estimated that 5,000 to 10,000 people have been killed.
- December 6 – General Joubert of the Piedmontese Republic occupies the Sardinian capital of Turin.

=== Date unknown ===
- Edward Jenner publishes An Inquiry into the Causes and Effects of the Variolæ Vaccinæ, describing the smallpox vaccine, in London.
- Thomas Malthus publishes An Essay on the Principle of Population (anonymously) in London.
- Nathan Mayer Rothschild moves from Frankfurt in the Holy Roman Empire to England, settling up in business as a textile trader and financier in Manchester.
- Alois Senefelder invents lithography.
- The first census in Brazil counts 2 million blacks in a total population of 3.25 million.
- The Ayrshire (Earl of Carrick's Own) Yeomanry, a British Army Yeomanry Cavalry Regiment, formed by The Earl of Cassillis at Culzean Castle, Ayrshire in 1794, is adopted onto the British Army List.
- The platypus is first discovered by Europeans.

== Births ==
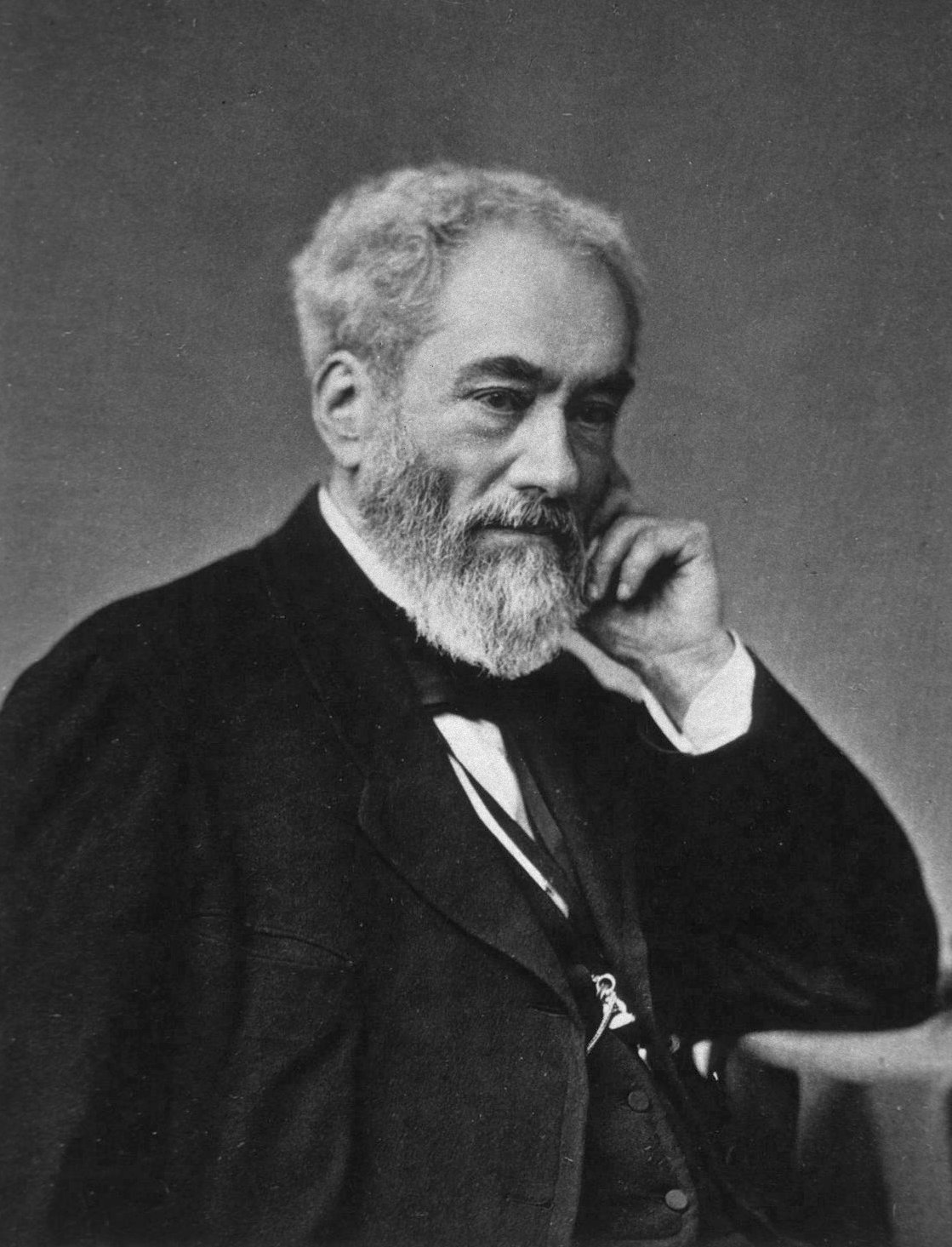
Robley Dunglison born 4 January

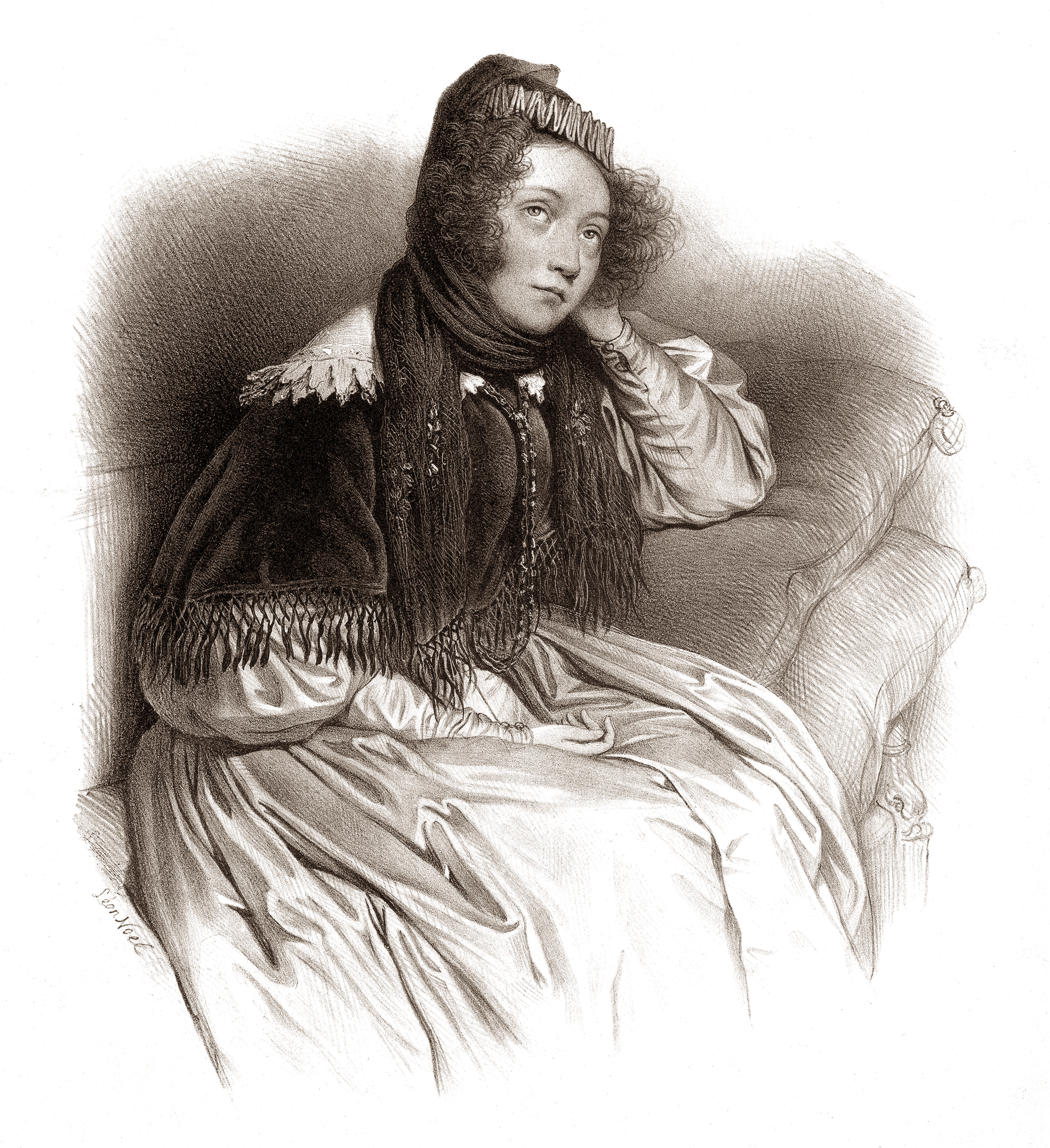
Marie Dorval born 6 January

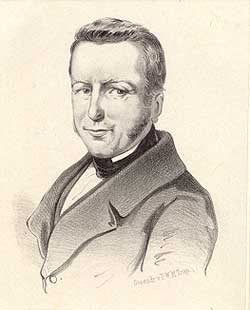
Isaac da Costa born 14 January

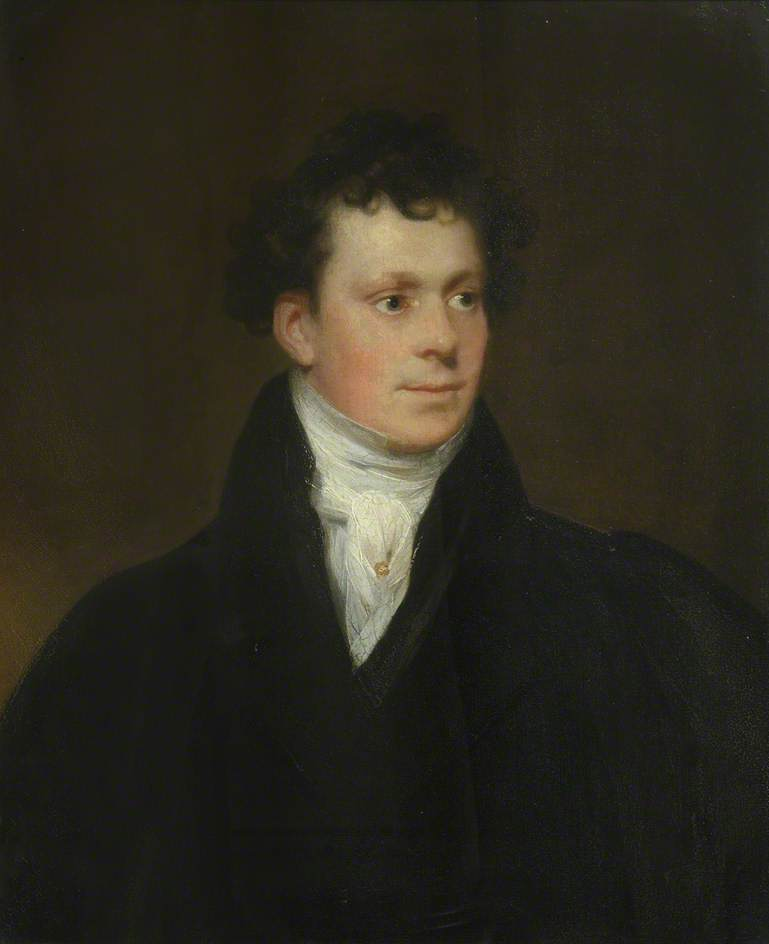
Joshua King born 16 January

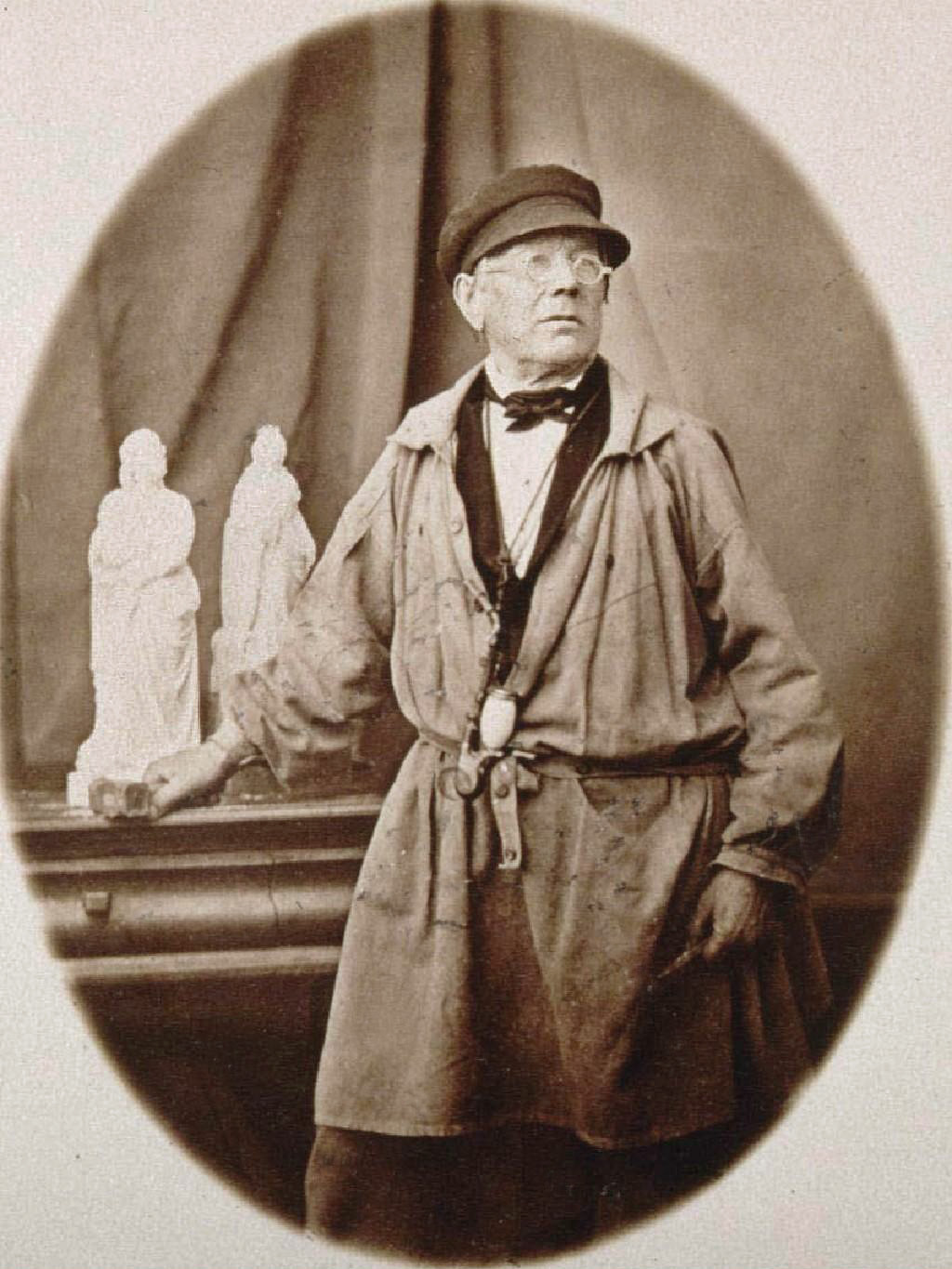
André Friedrich born 17 January

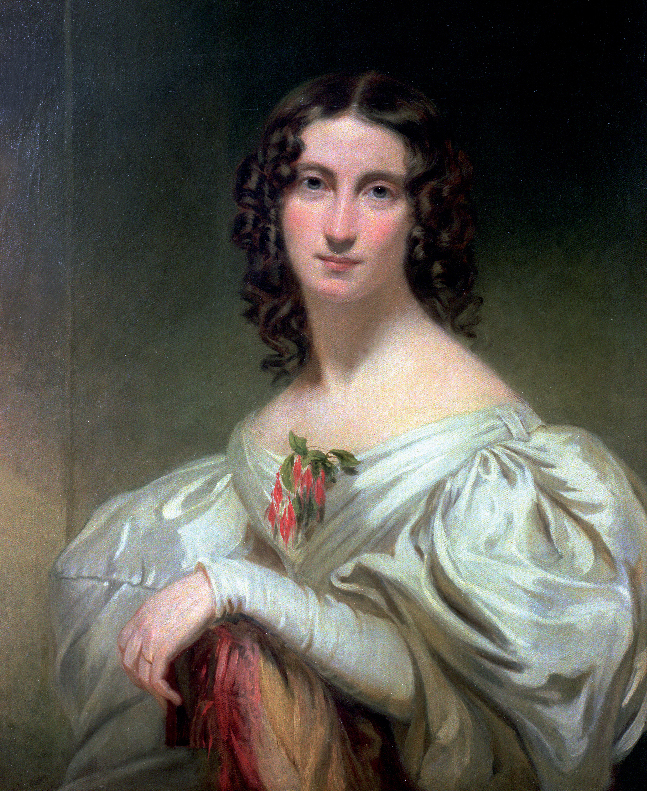
Jane Williams born 21 January

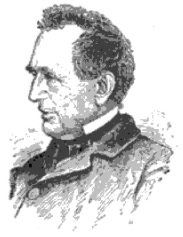
Charles Davies (professor) born 22 January

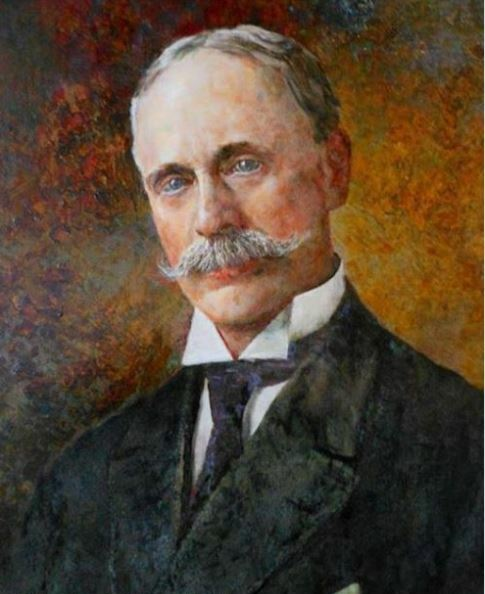
Henry Addison (mayor) born 24 January

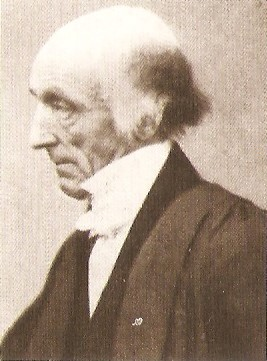
Richard William Jelf born 25 January

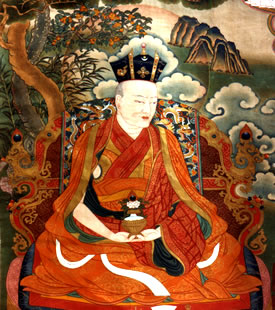
Thekchok Dorje, 14th Karmapa Lama born 27 January

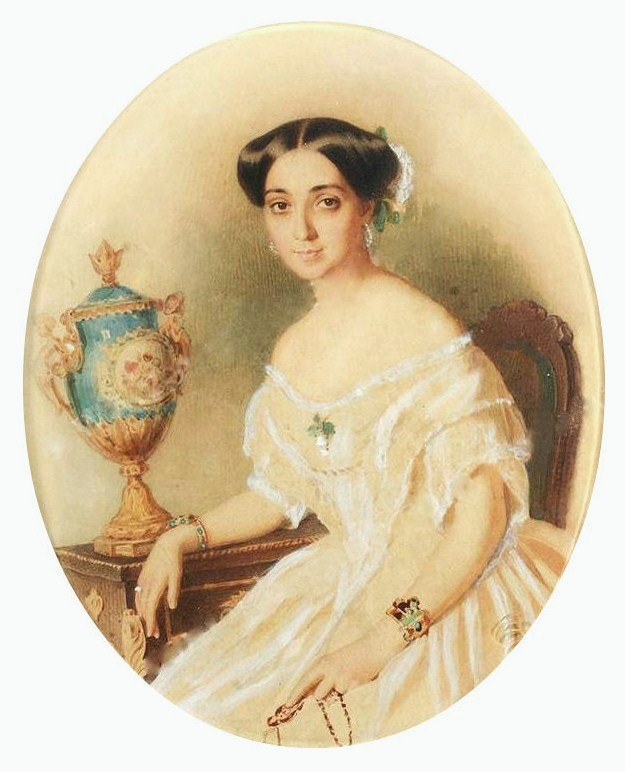
Ana Gruzinskaya Tolstaya born 31 January

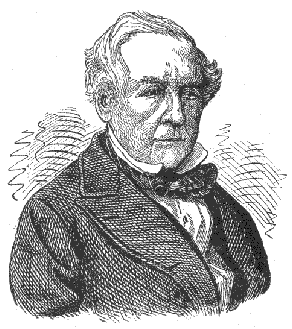
John Cochrane (chess player) born 4 February

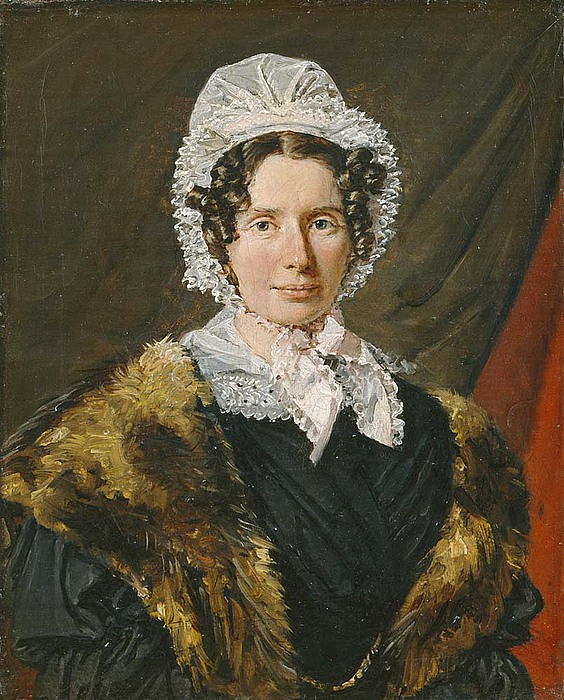
Bolette Puggaard born 7 February

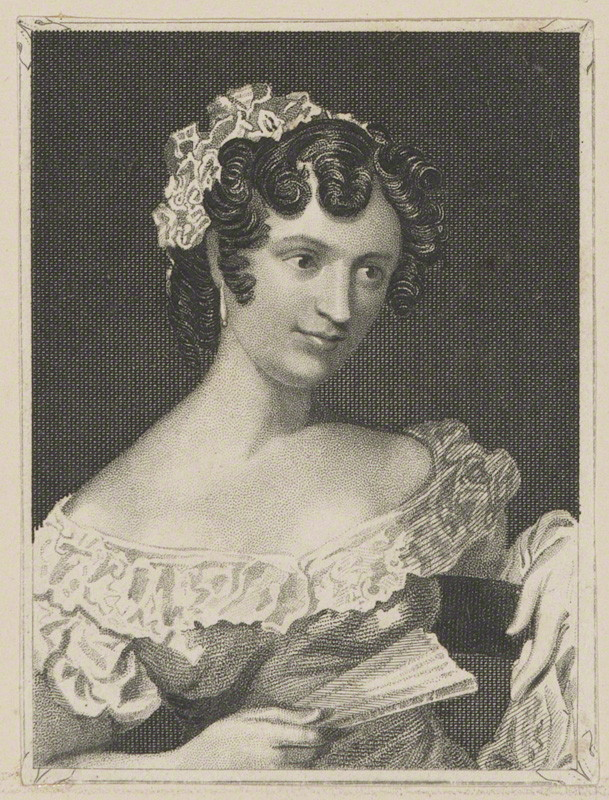
Harriet Waylett born 7 February

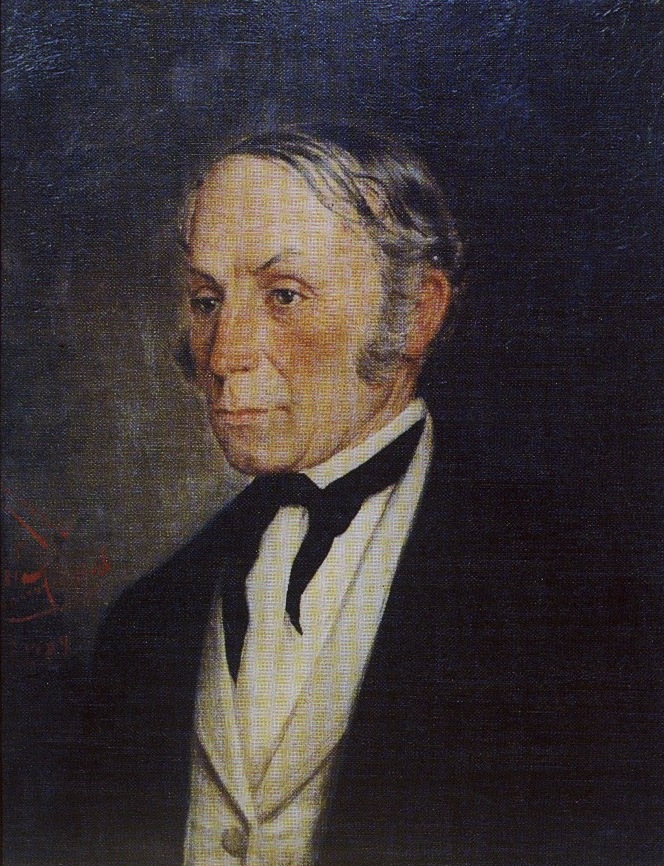
Johann Schroth born 11 February

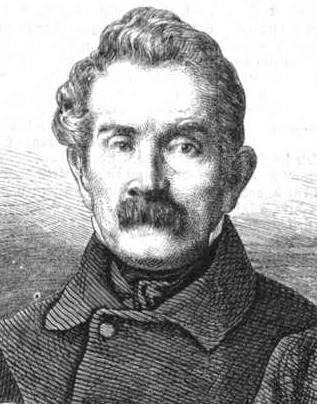
Heinrich Beitzke born 15 February

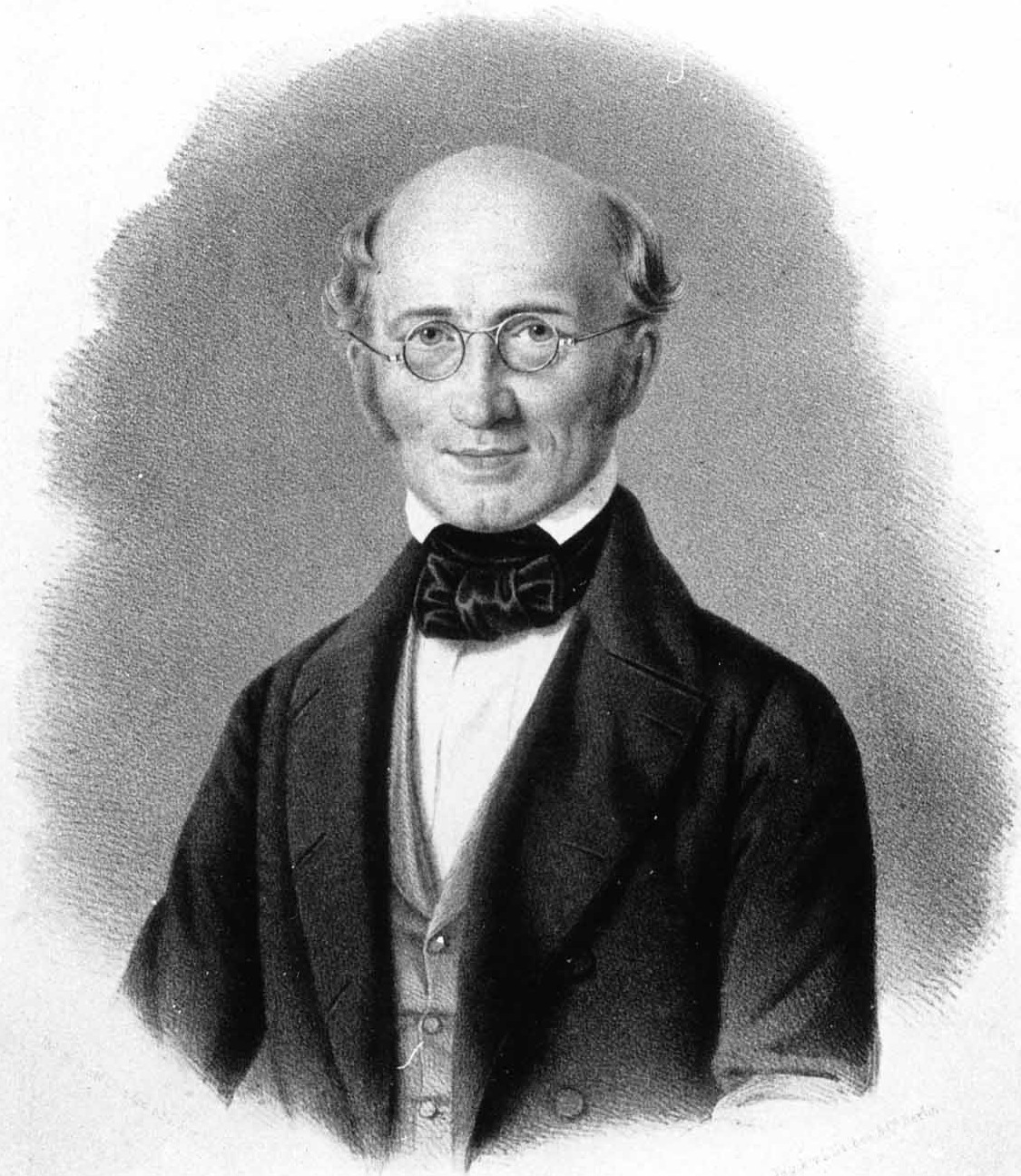
Friedrich Eduard Beneke born 17 February

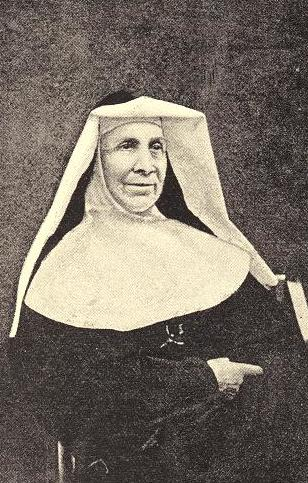
Ann Agnes Trail born 17 February

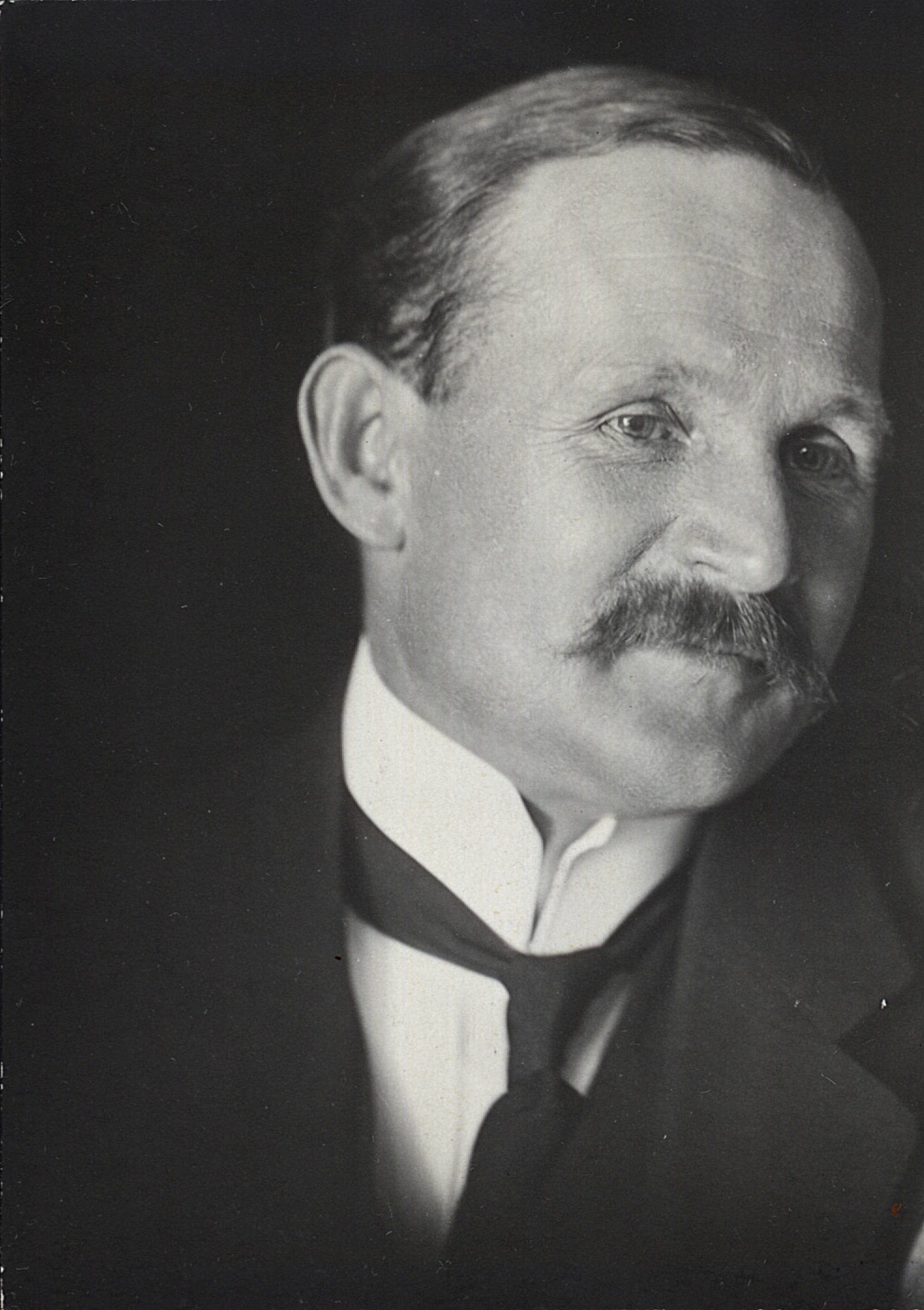
Johann Jakob Ulrich born 28 February

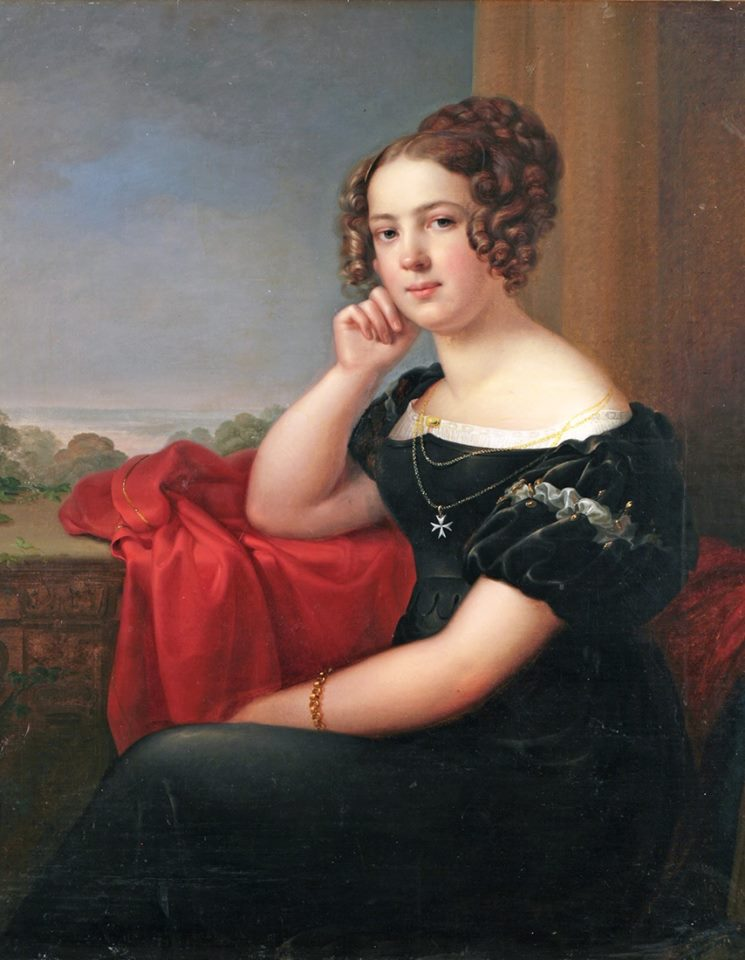
Princess Louise of Anhalt-Dessau born 1 March

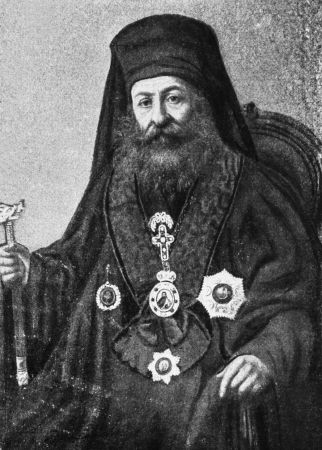
Gregory VI of Constantinople born 1 March

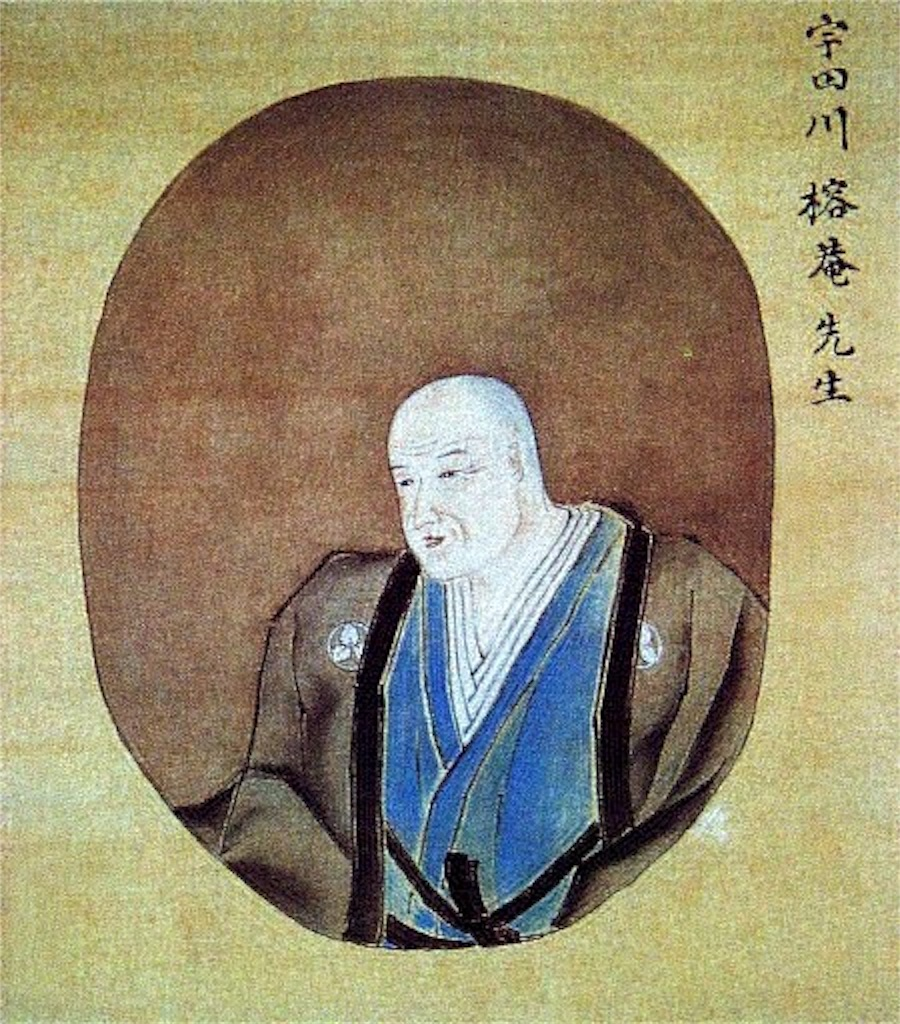
Udagawa Yōan born 9 March

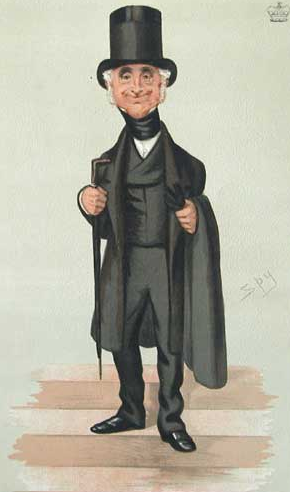
Thomas Fremantle, 1st Baron Cottesloe born 11 March

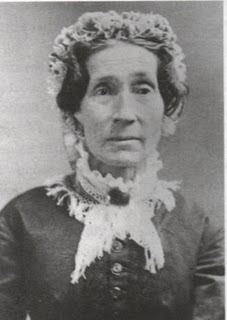
Elizabeth Goodridge born 12 March

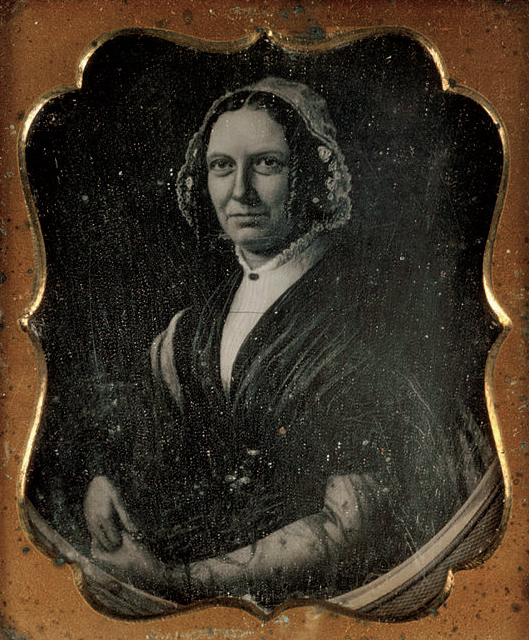
Abigail Fillmore born 13 March

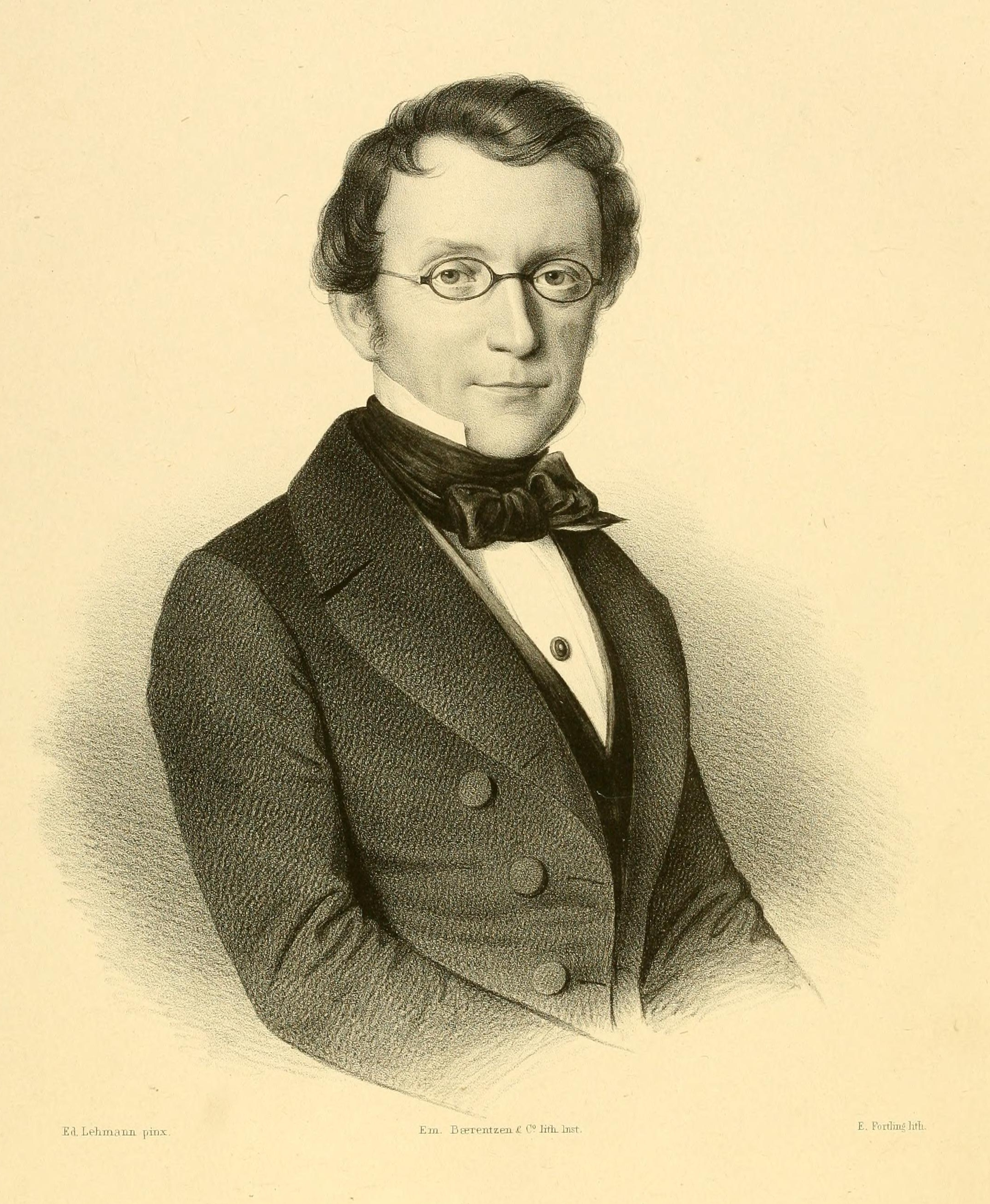
Daniel Frederik Eschricht born 18 March

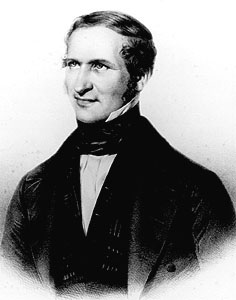
Gustav Rose born 18 March

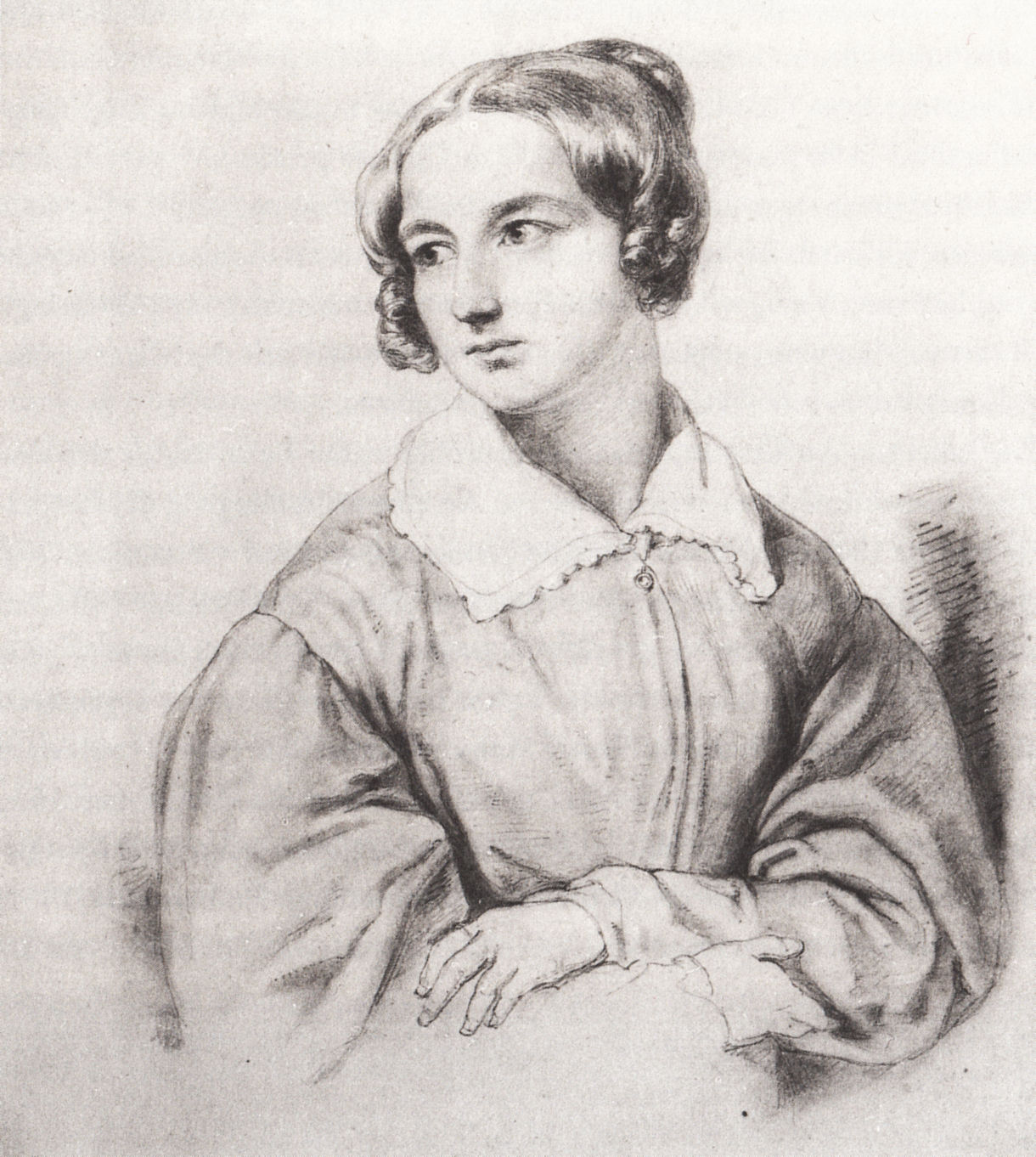
Luise Hensel born 30 March

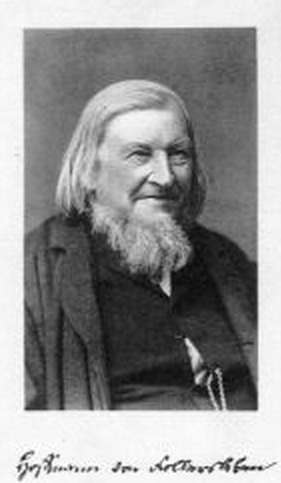
August Heinrich Hoffmann von Fallersleben born 2 April

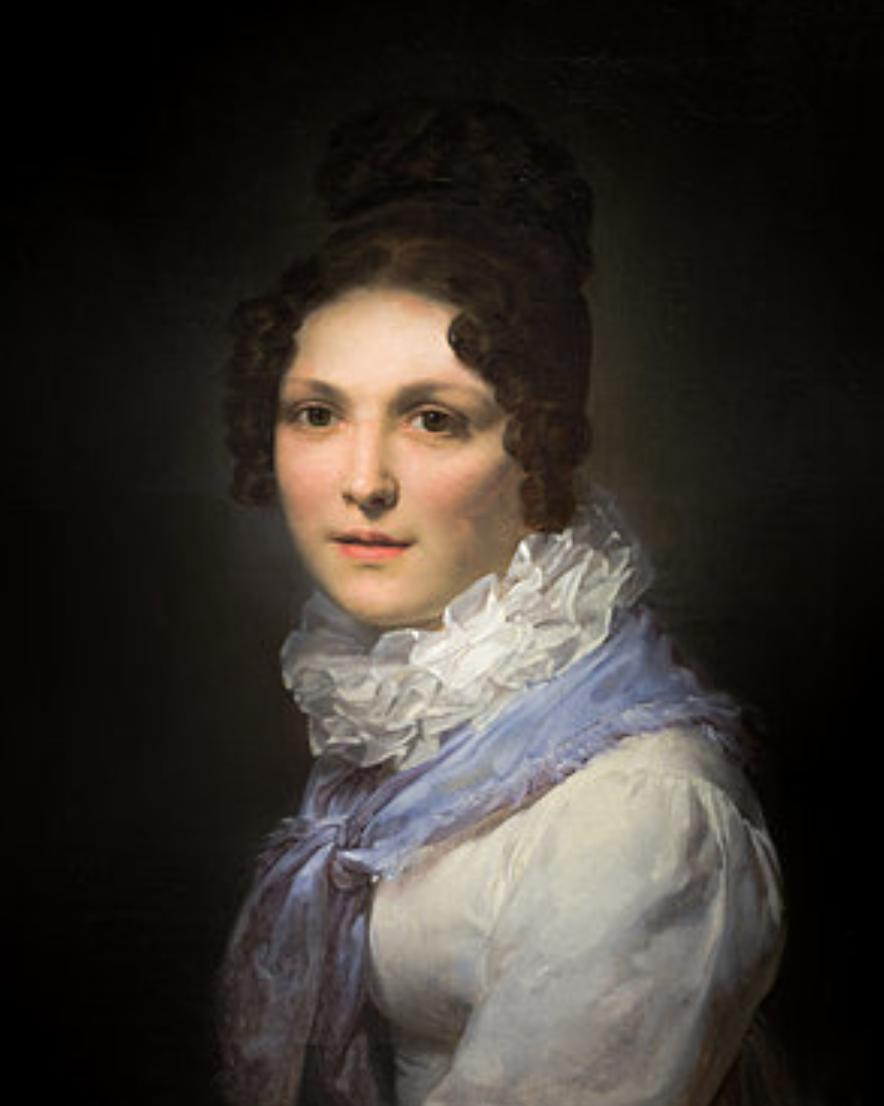
Marie Amélie Cogniet born 5 April

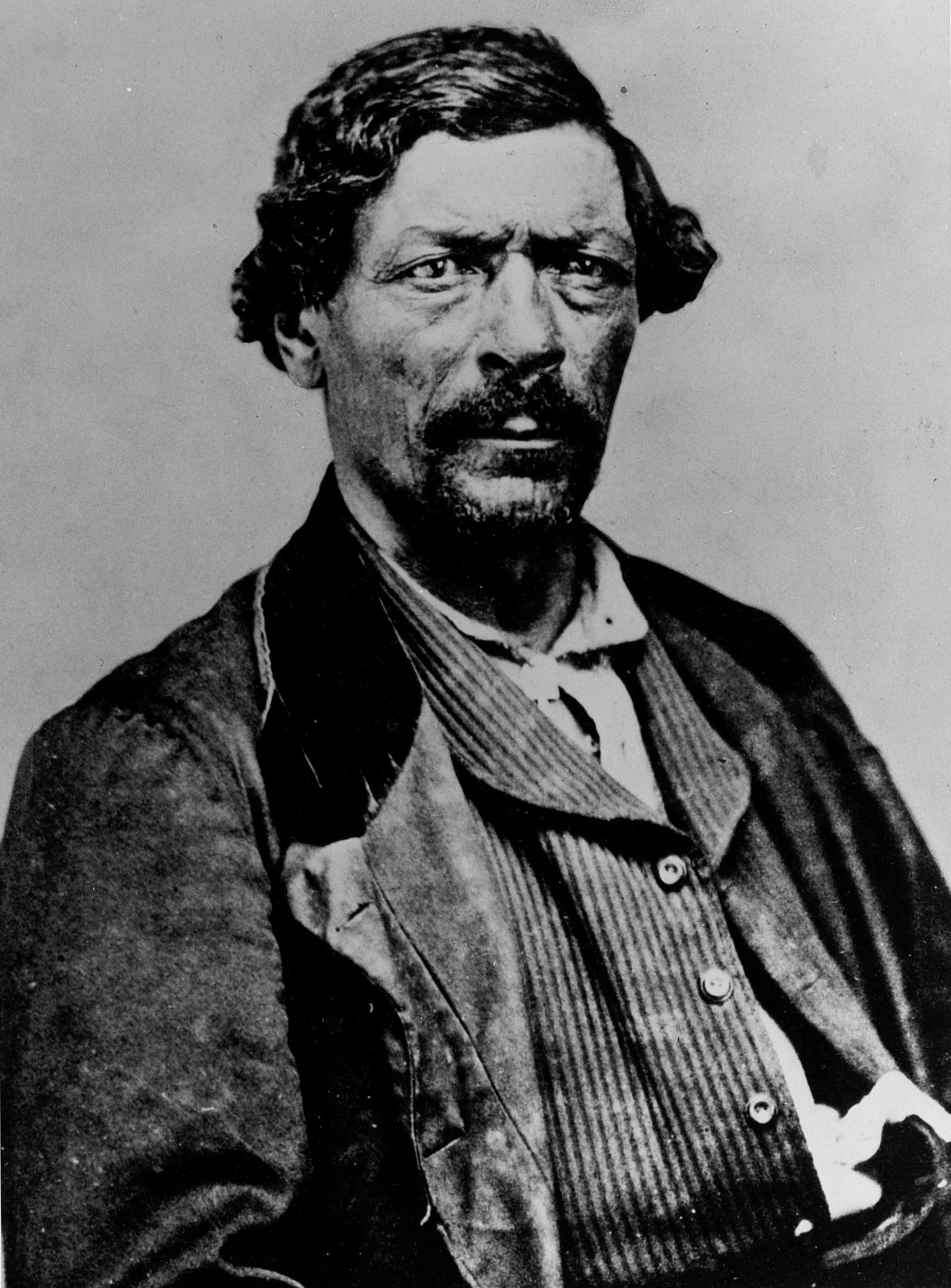
James Beckwourth born 6 April

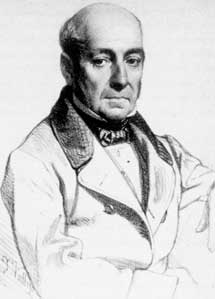
Ramón de la Sagra born 8 April

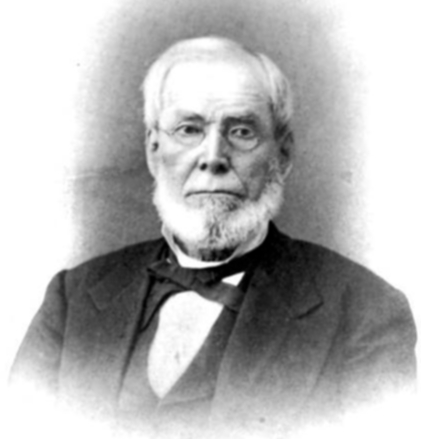
Arphaxed Loomis born 9 April

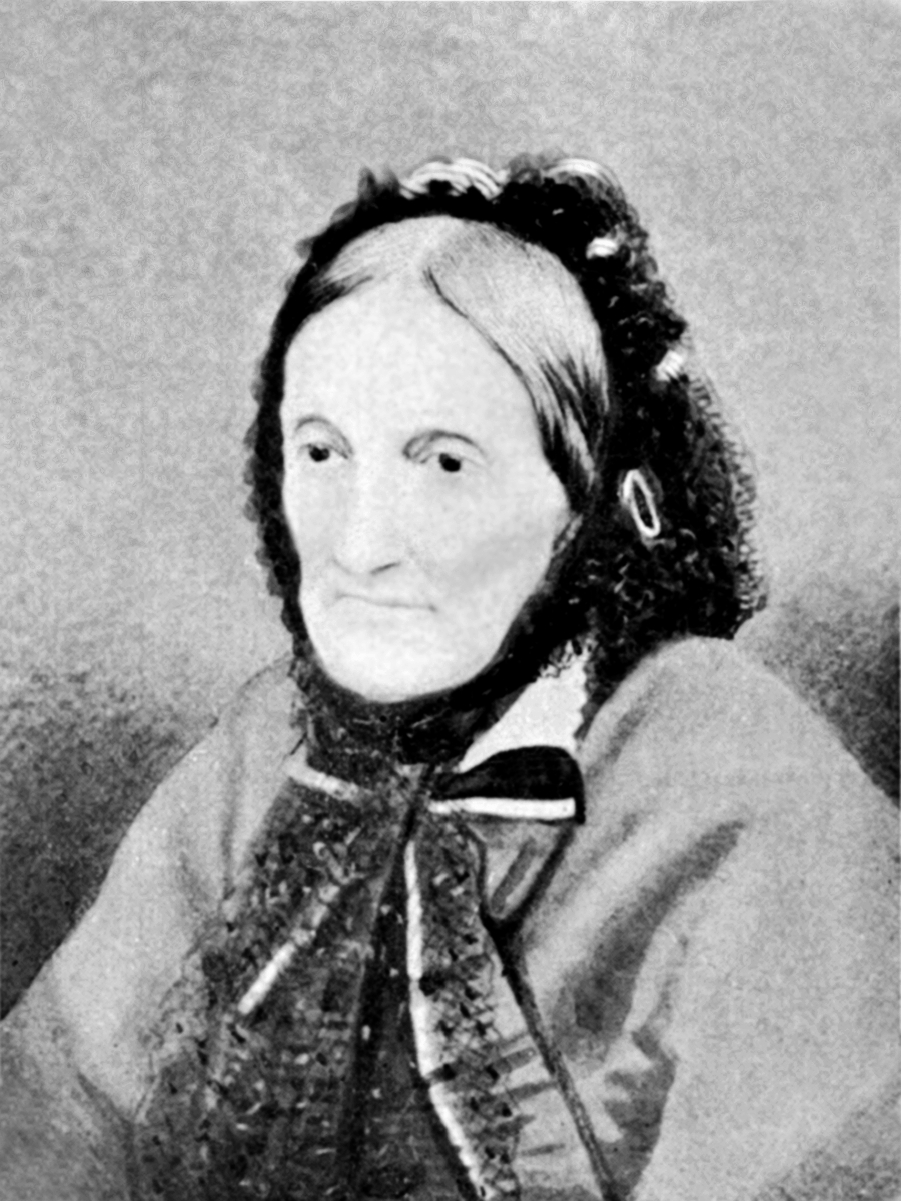
Fanny Gulick born 16 April

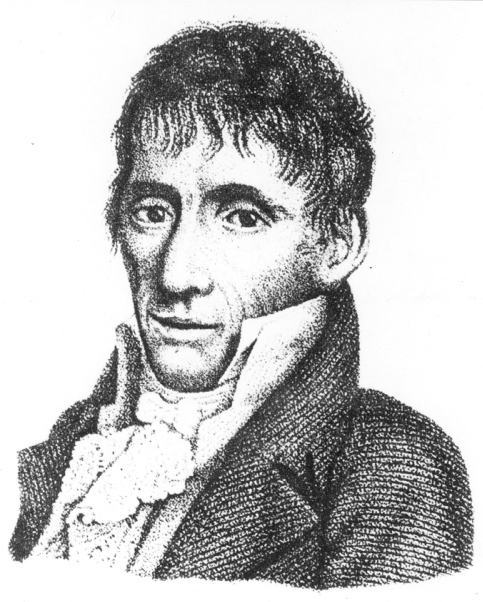
Antonio Rolla born 18 April

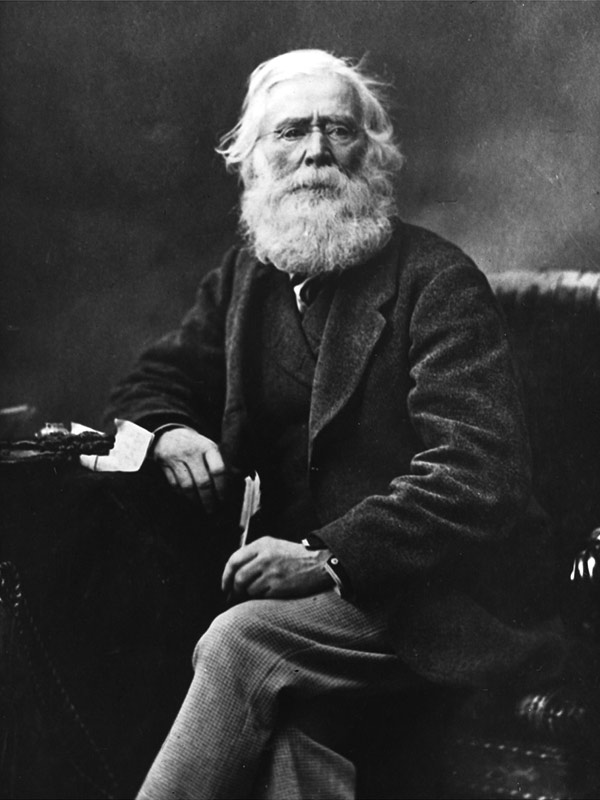
William Edmond Logan born 20 April

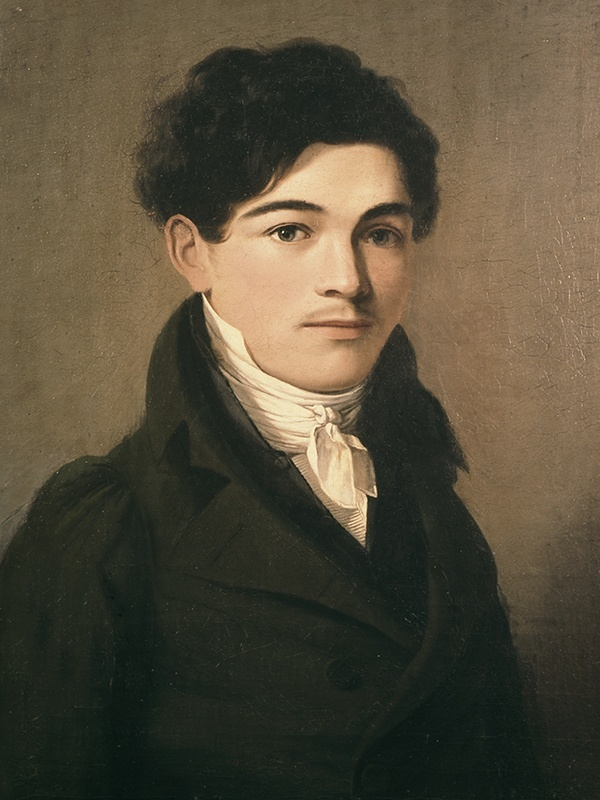
Adolf von Rauch born 22 April

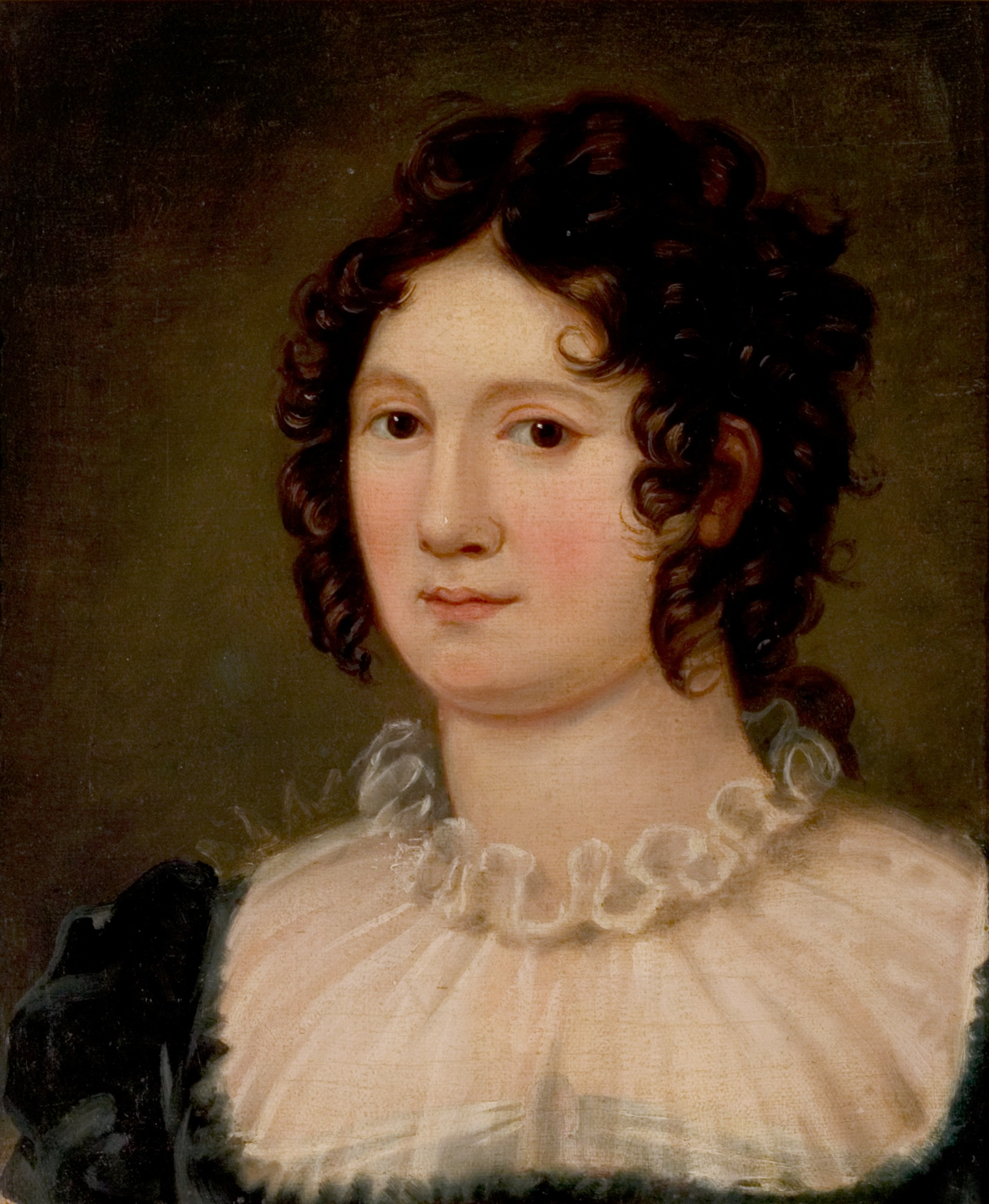
Claire Clairmont born 27 April

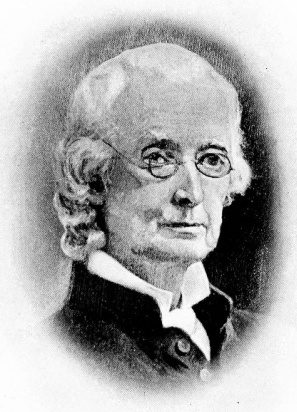
William Mercer Green born 2 May

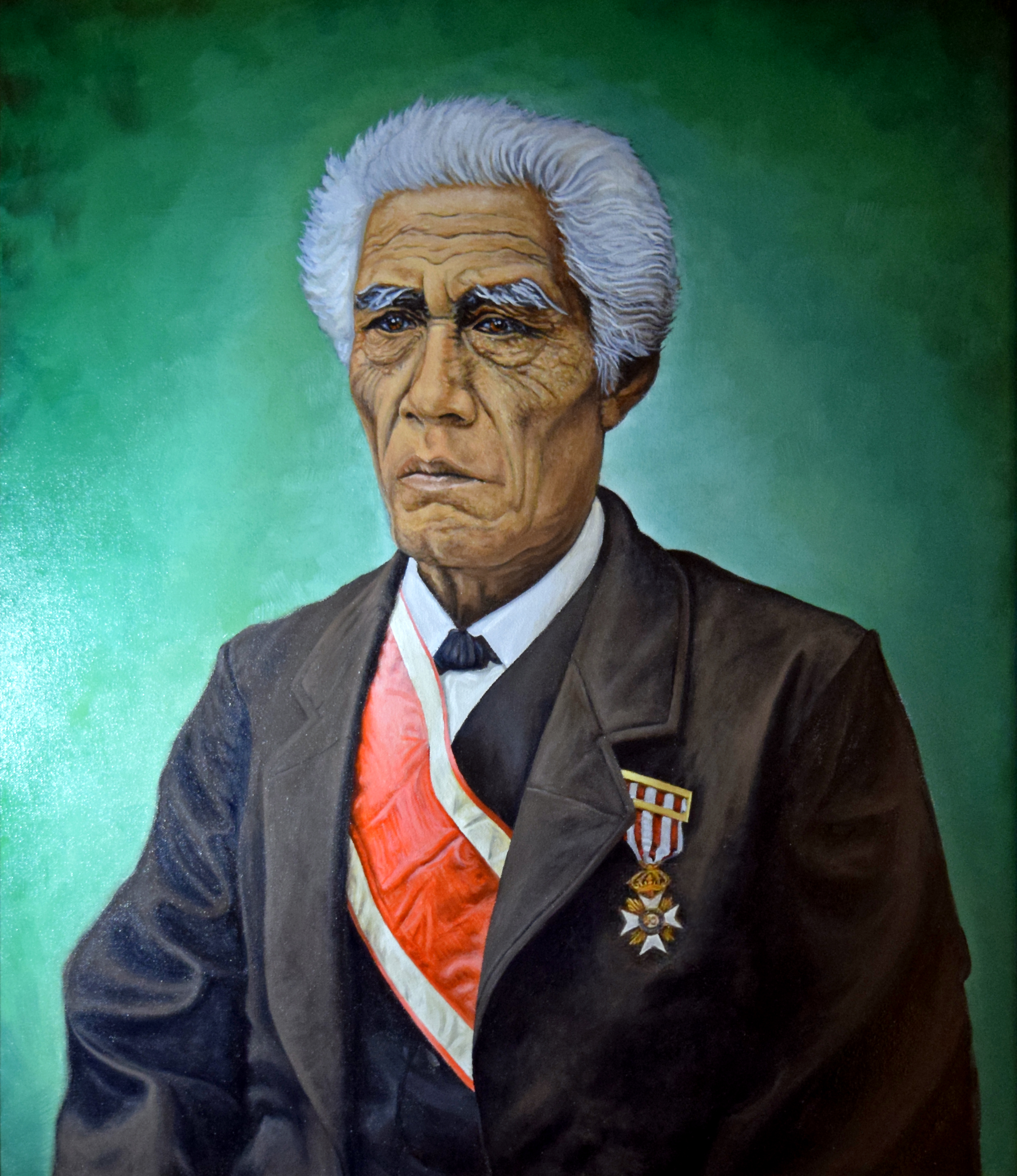
Charles Kanaʻina born 4 May

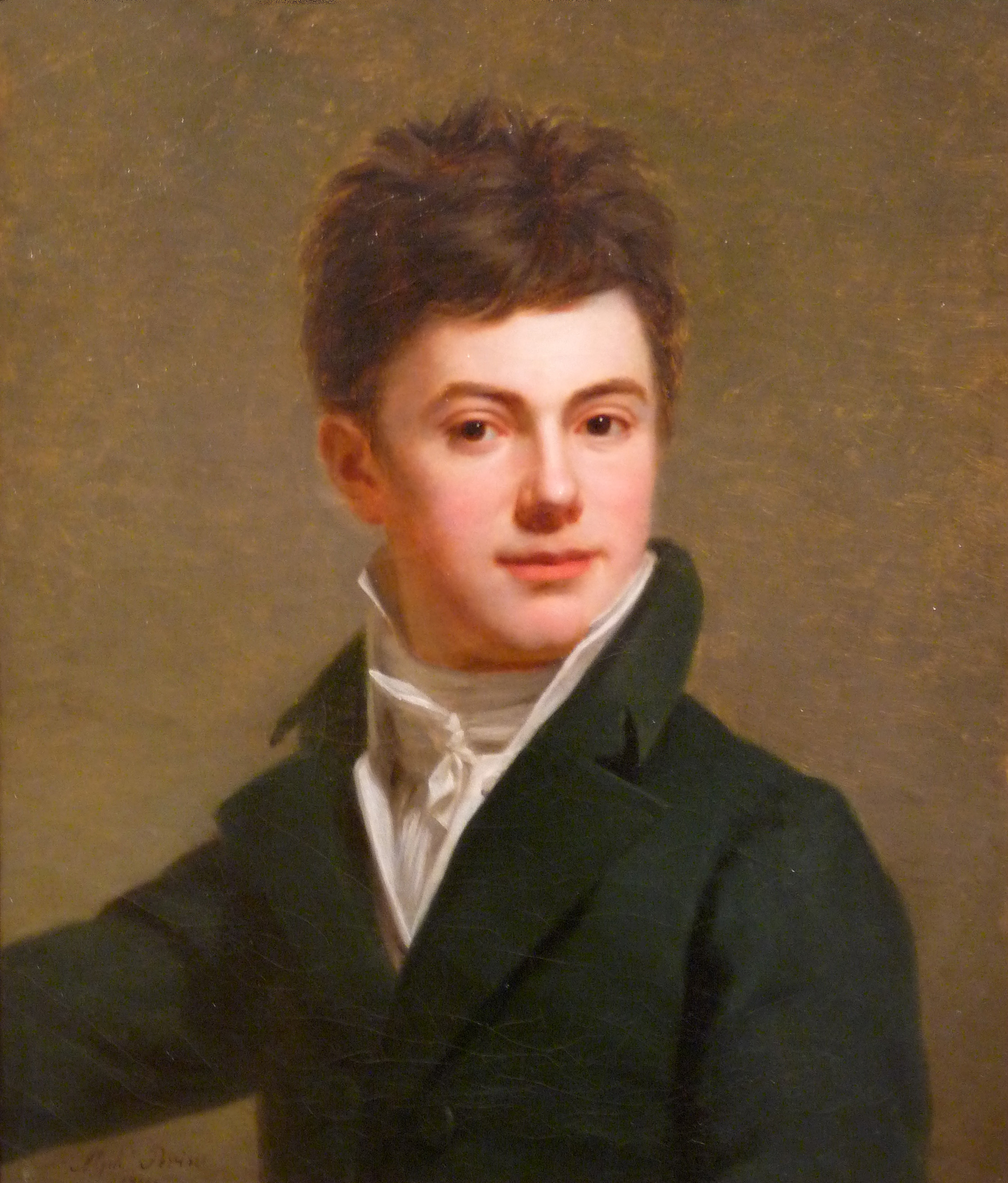
Alphonse Périn born 12 May

Ellis Lewis born 16 May

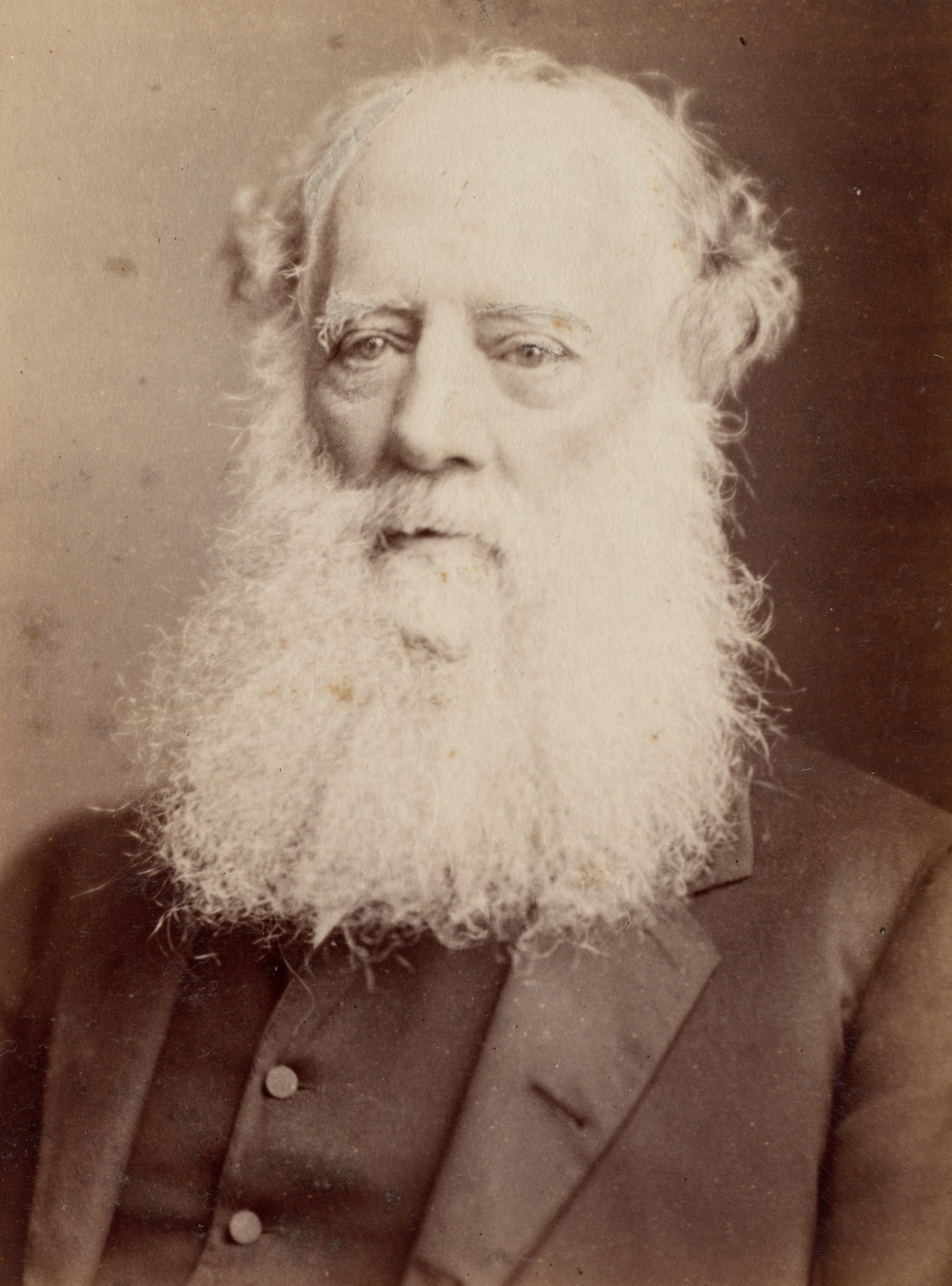
William Branwhite Clarke born 2 June

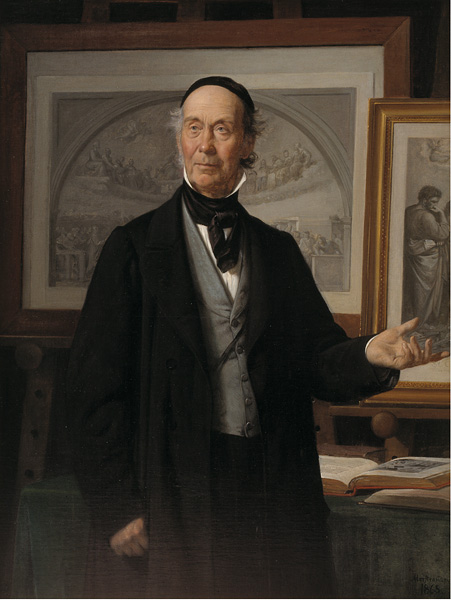
Niels Laurits Høyen born 4 June

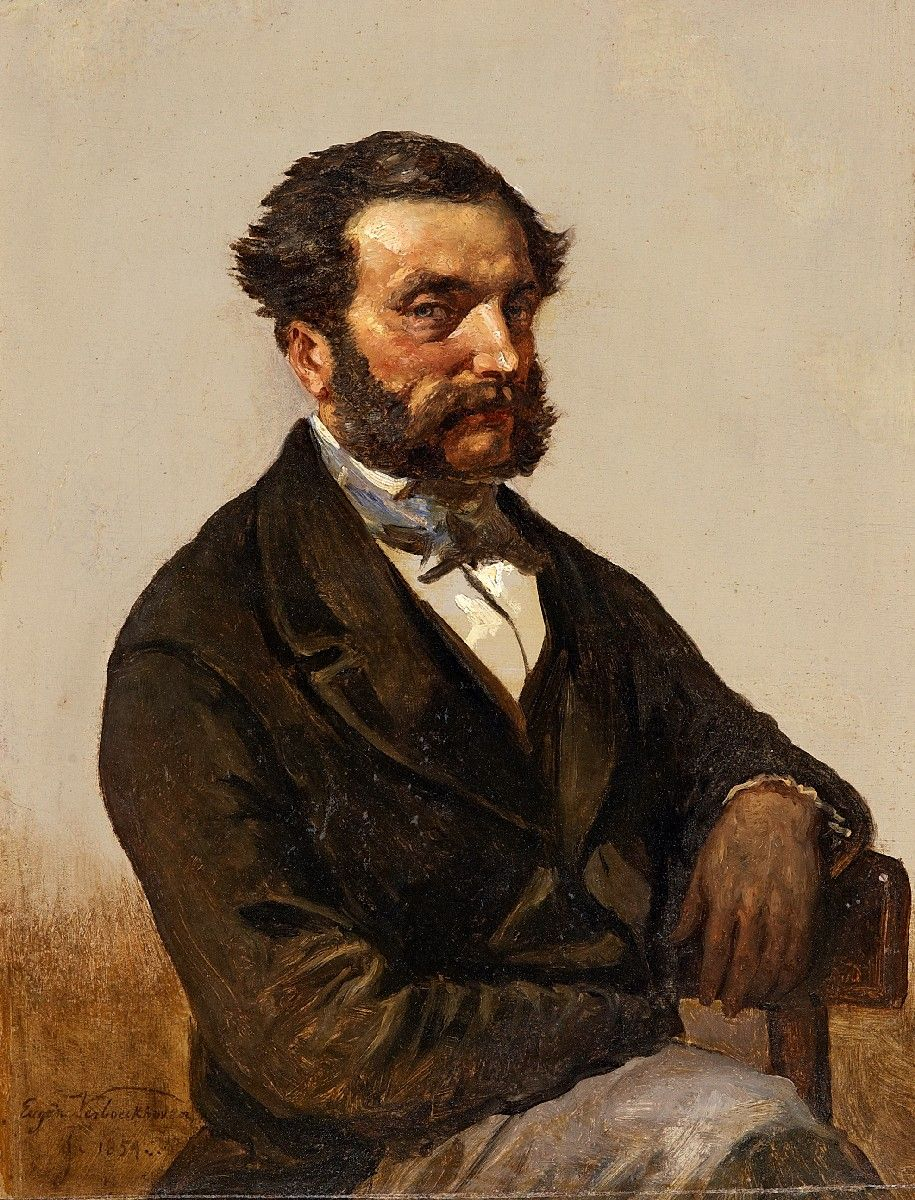
Eugène Joseph Verboeckhoven born 9 June

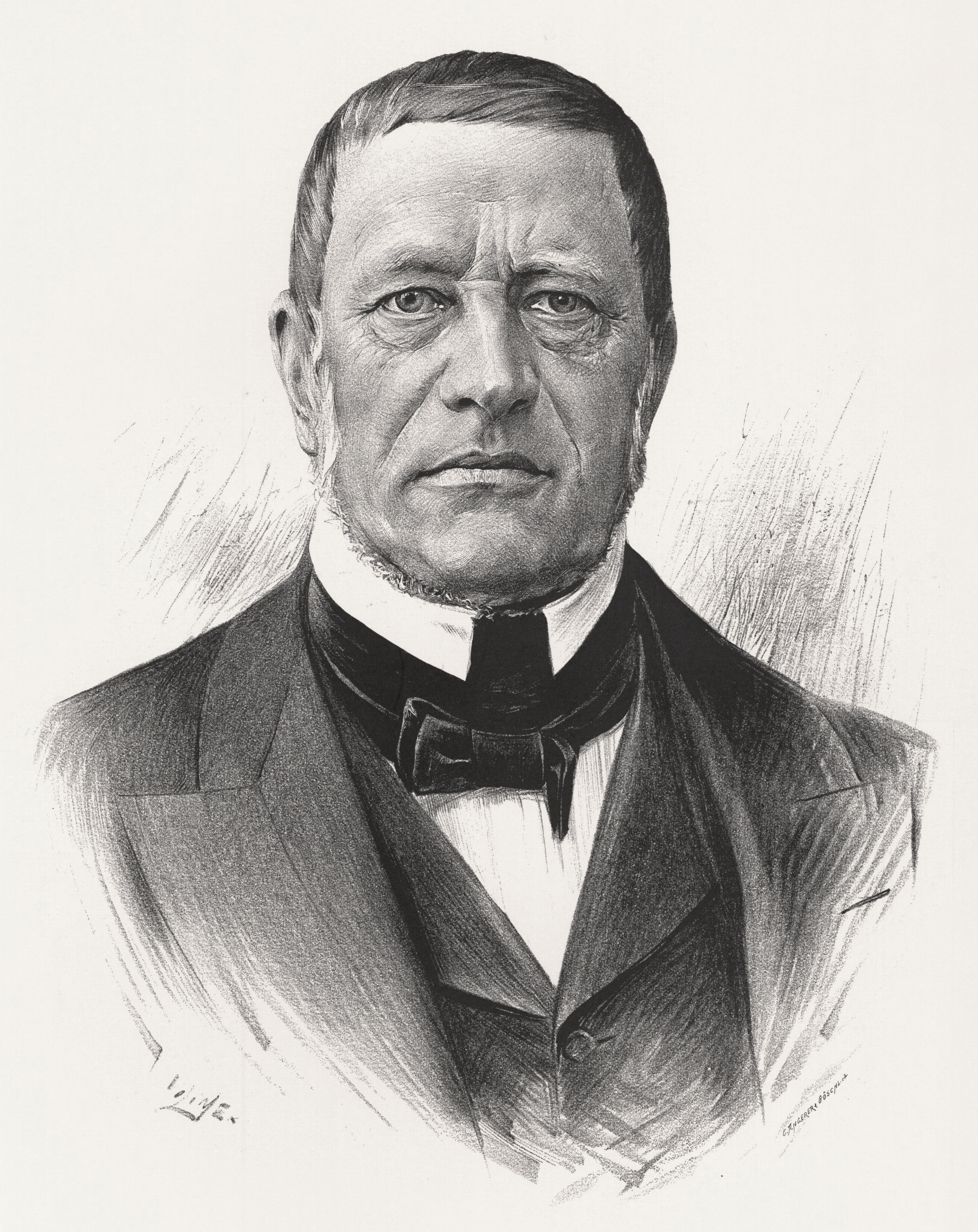
František Palacký born 14 June

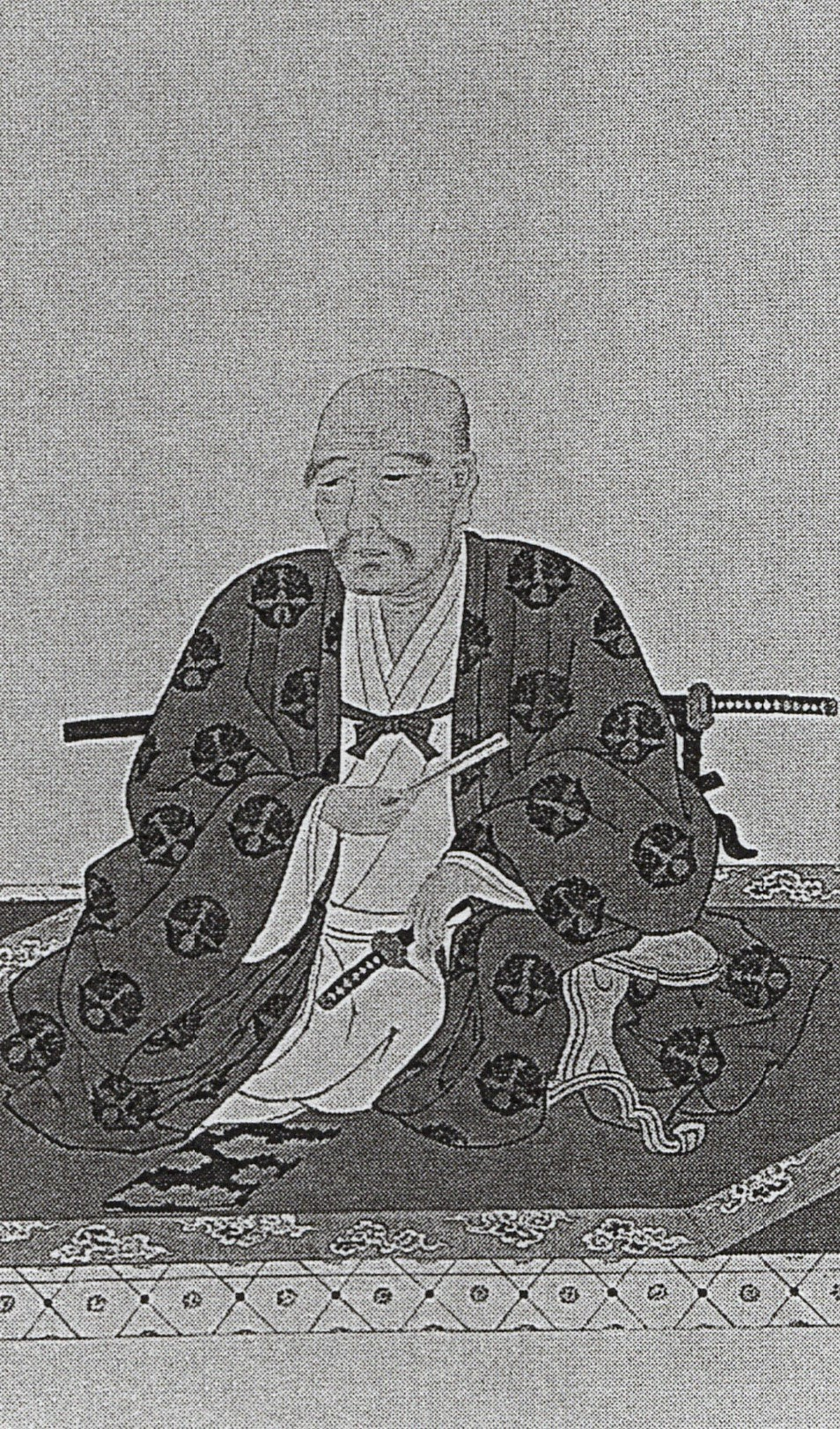
Nabeshima Naotomo born 16 June

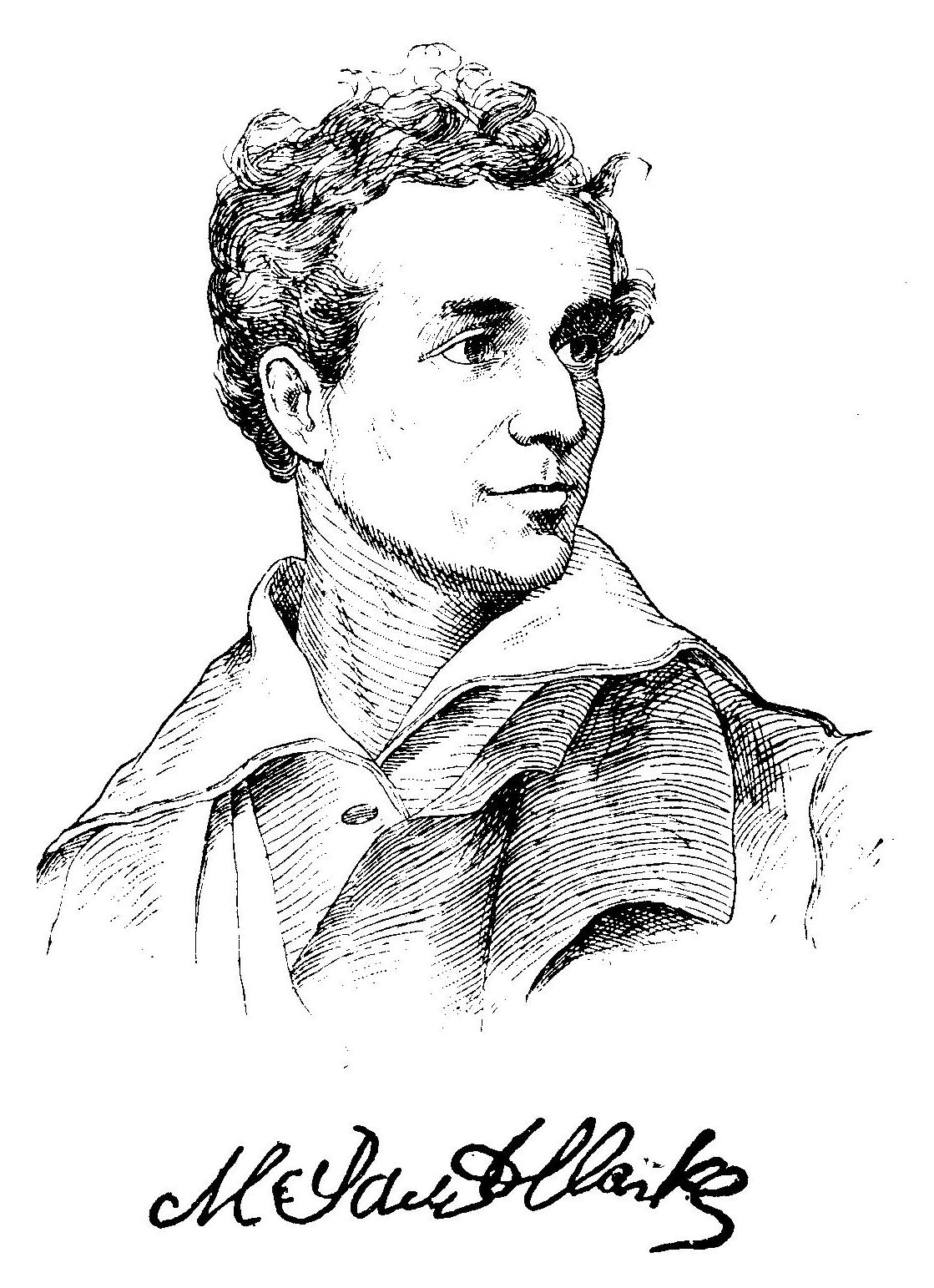
McDonald Clarke born 18 June

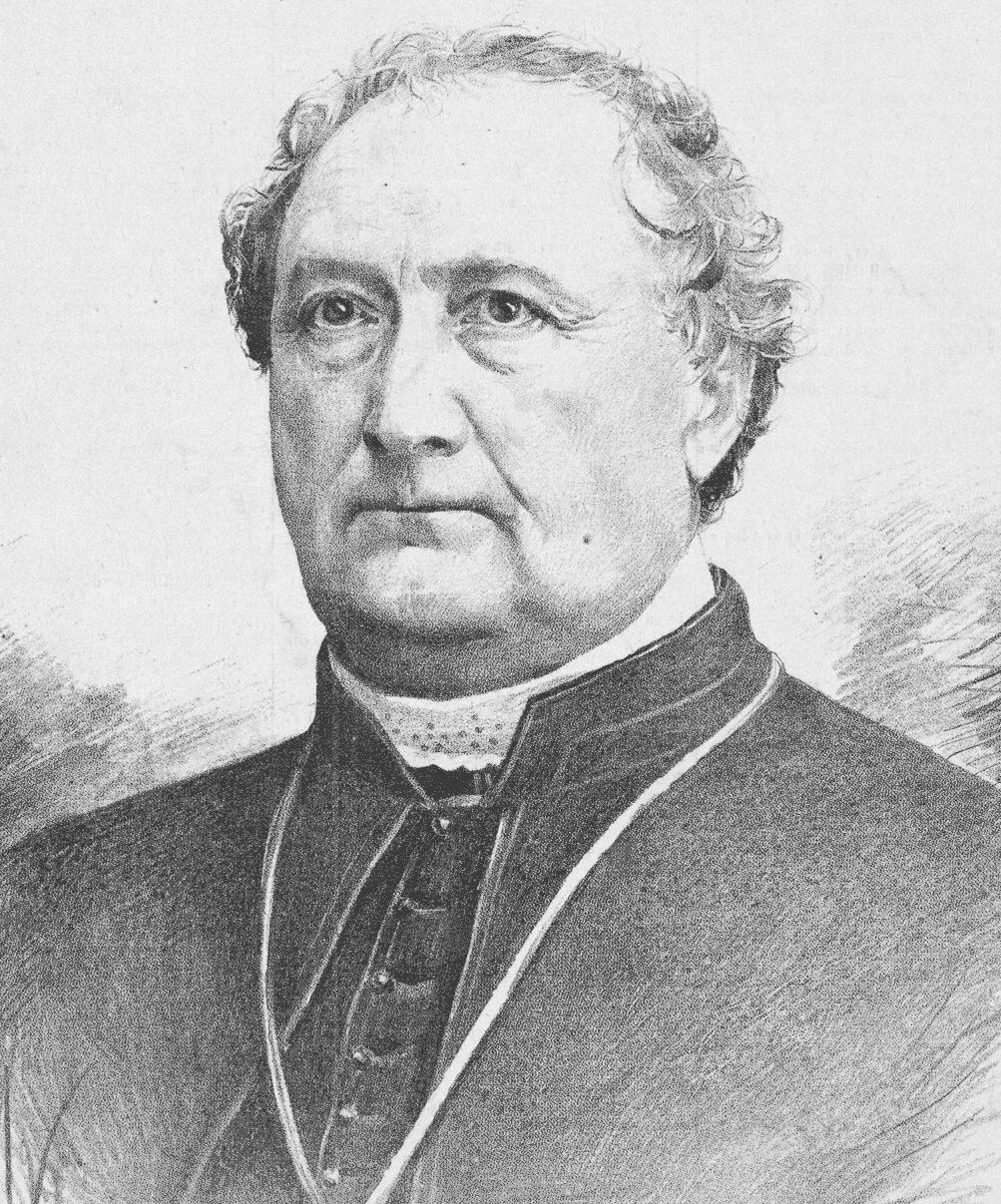
Jan Valerián Jirsík born 19 June

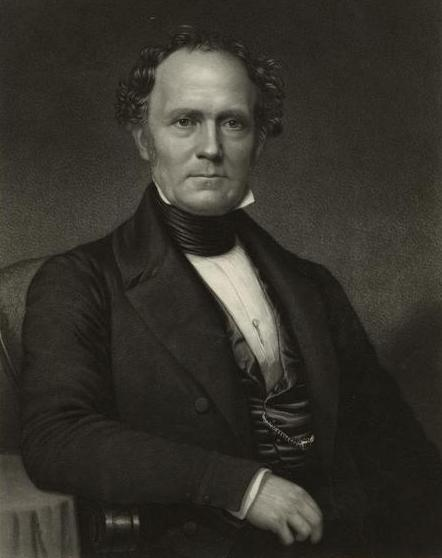
Walter Hilliard Bidwell born 21 June

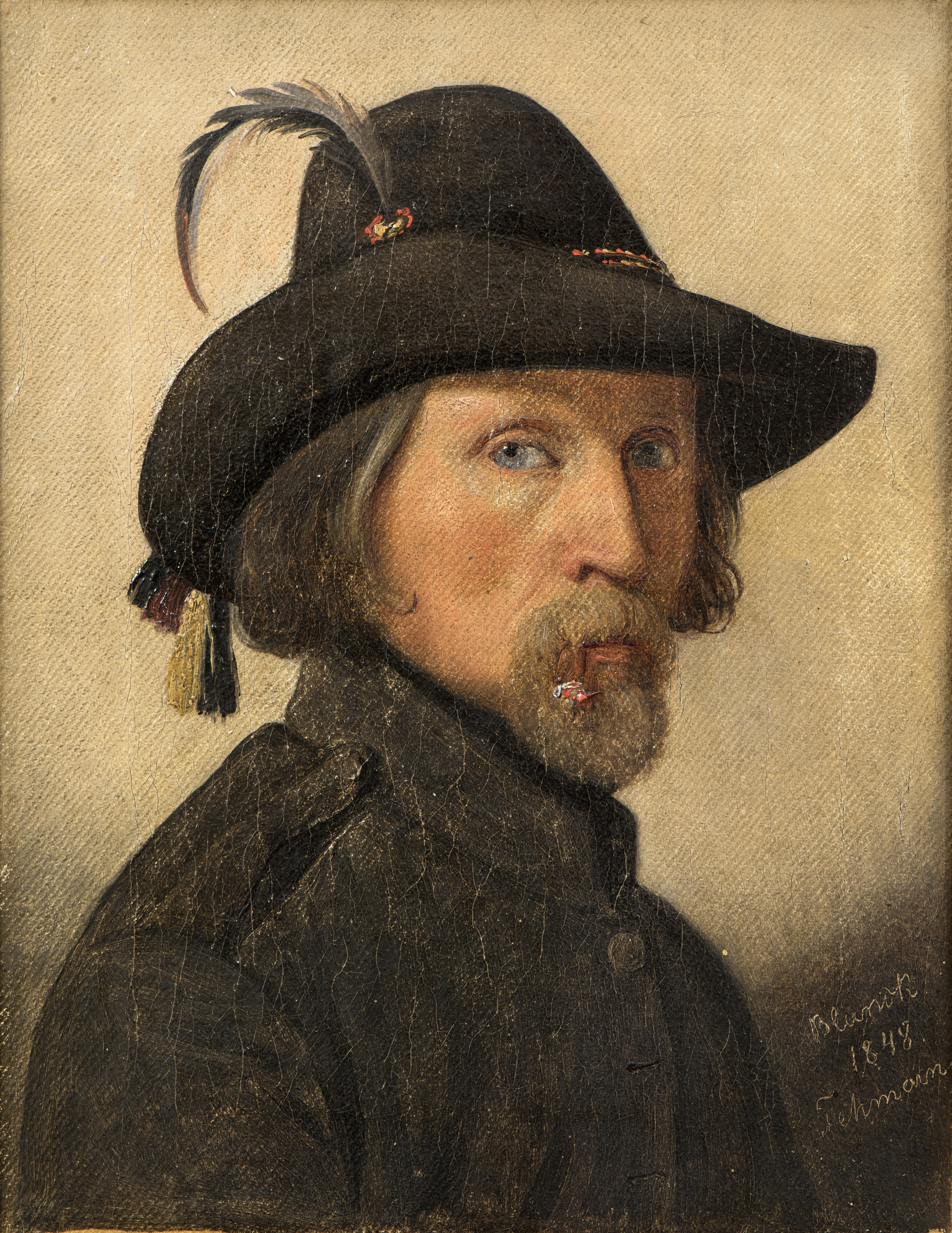
Ditlev Blunck born 22 June

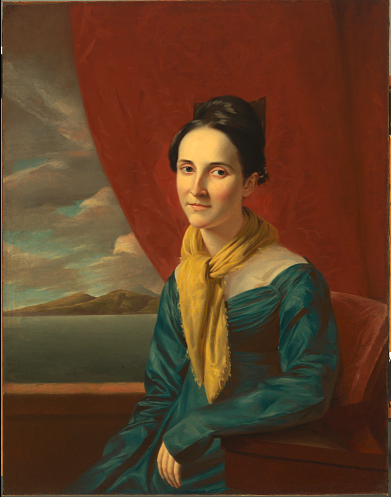
Harriet Bradford Tiffany Stewart born 24 June

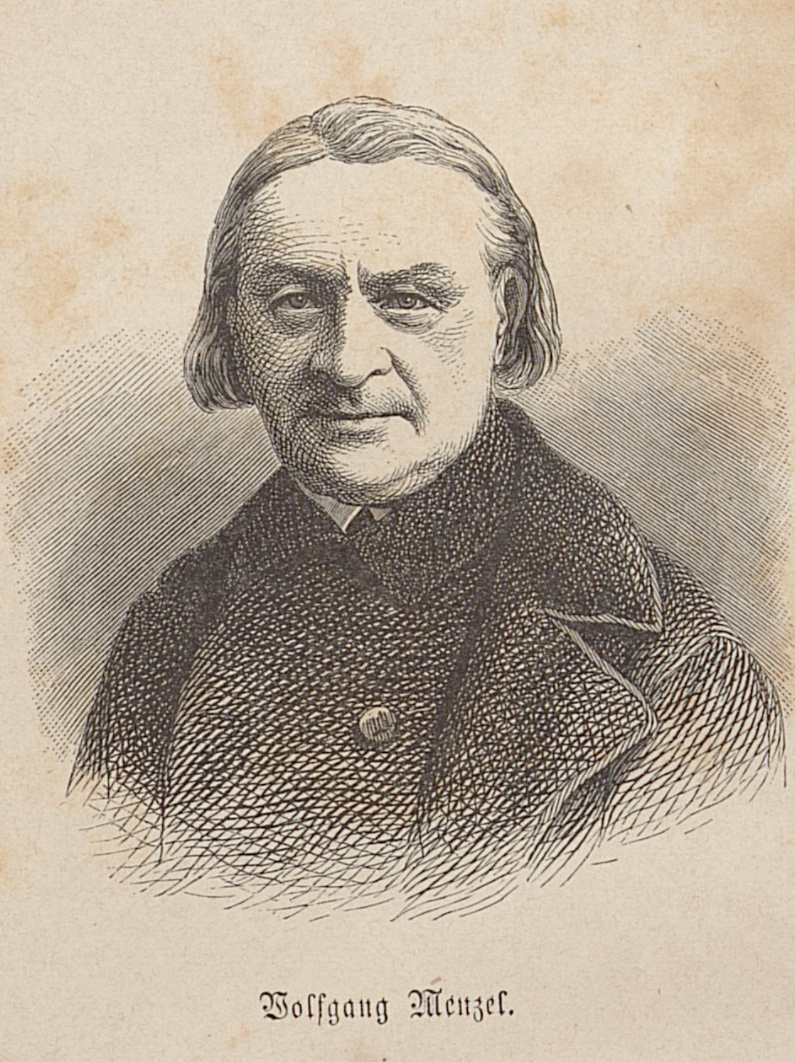
Wolfgang Menzel born 26 June

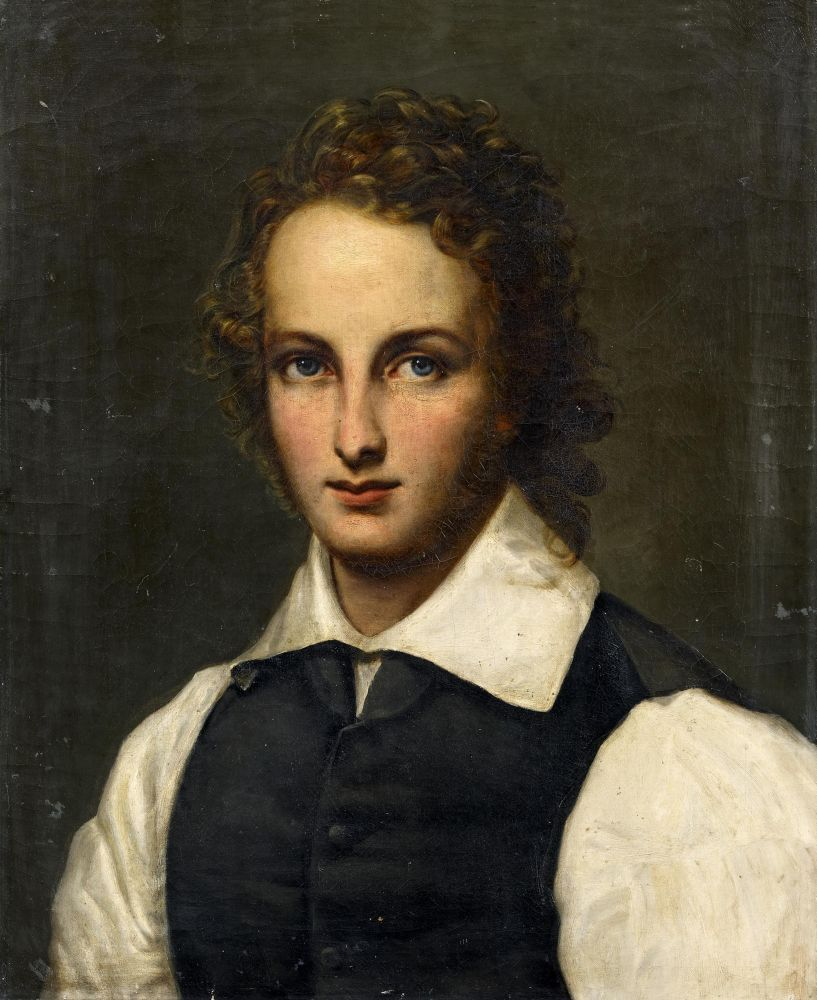
Gustav Adolf Michaelis born 9 July

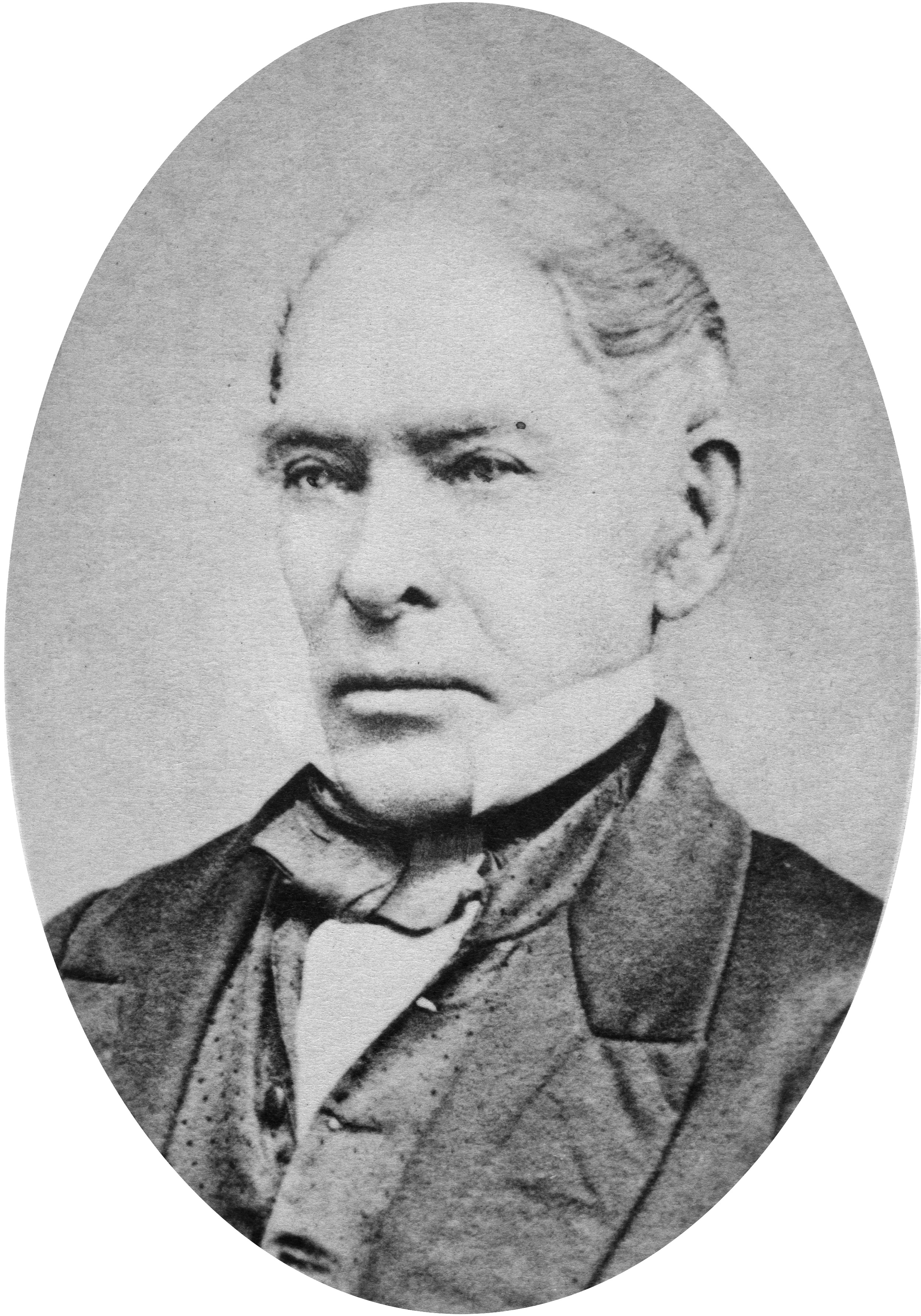
Cyrus Bryant born 12 July

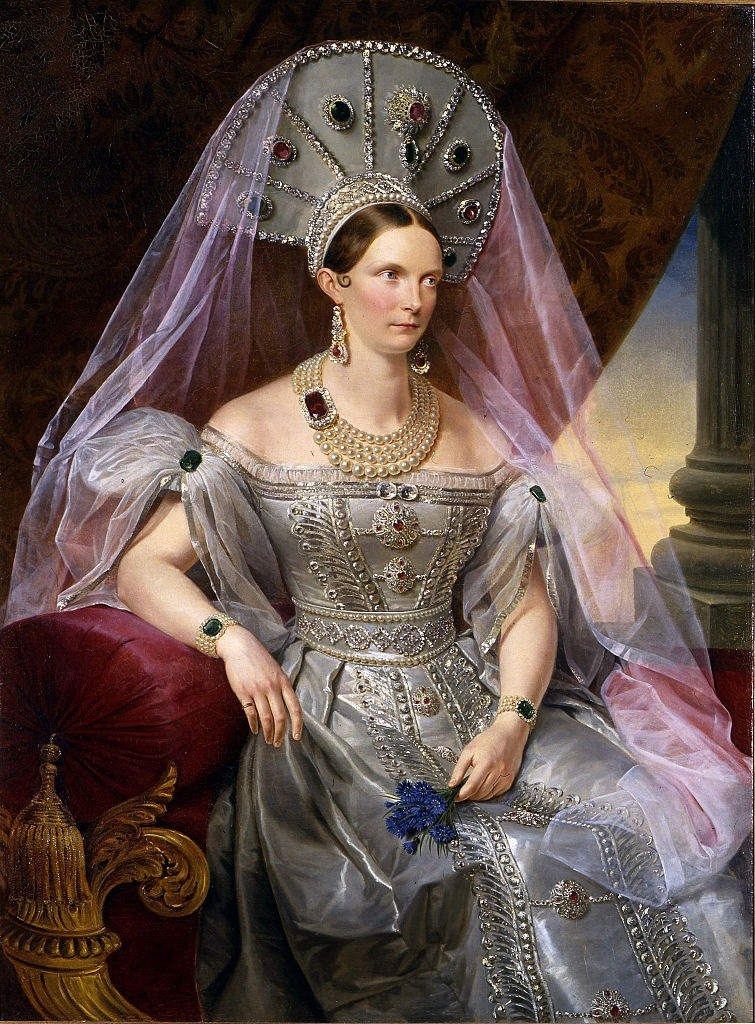
Alexandra Feodorovna (Charlotte of Prussia) born 13 July

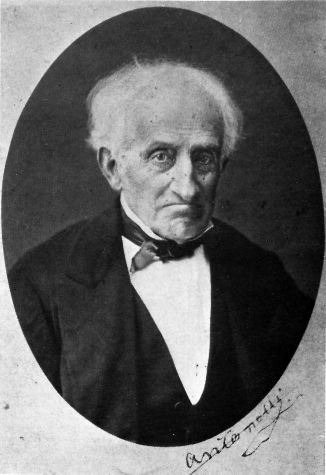
Alessandro Antonelli born 14 July

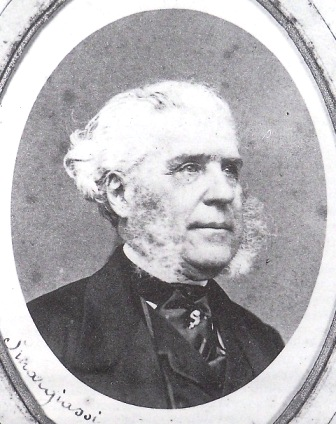
Gabriele Smargiassi born 22 July

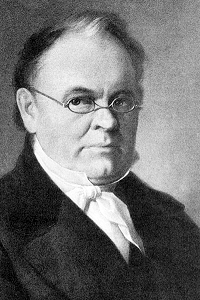
Albert Knapp born 25 July

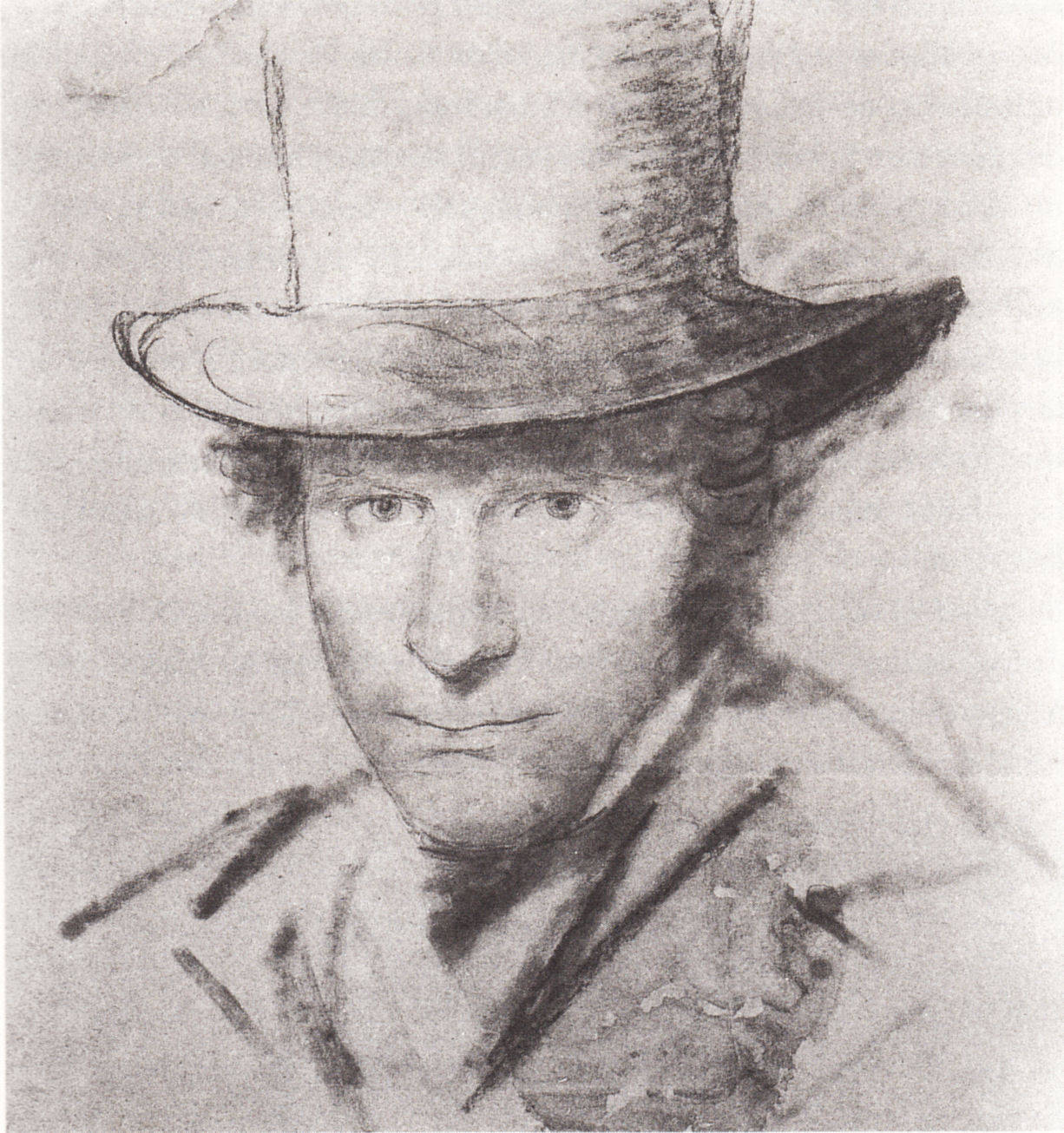
Carl Blechen born 29 July

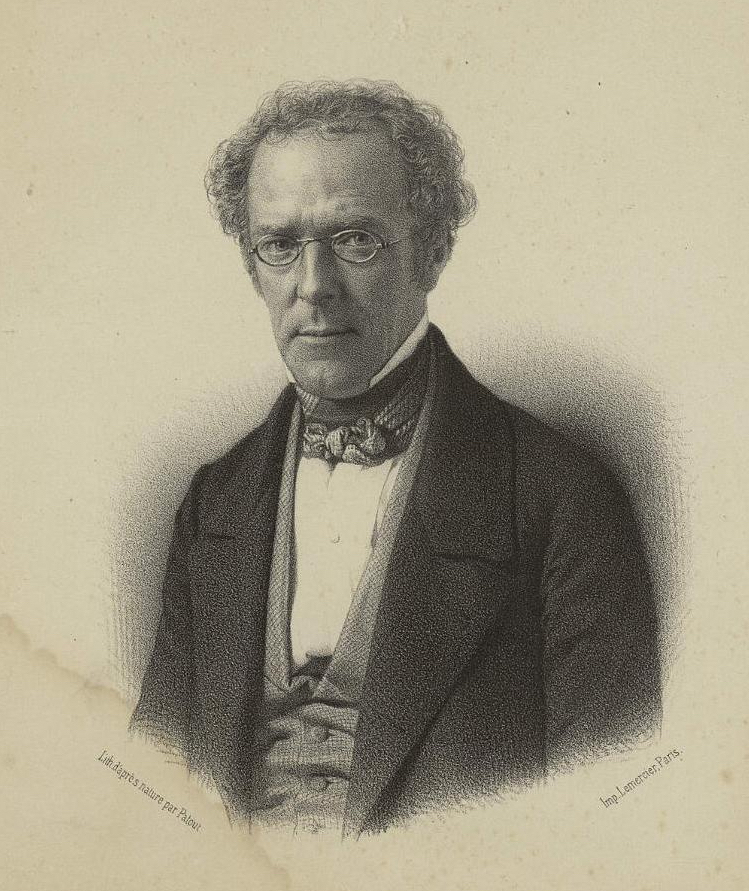
Prosper Duvergier de Hauranne born 3 August

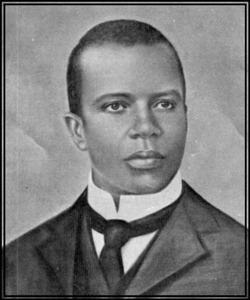
Walker Lewis born 3 August

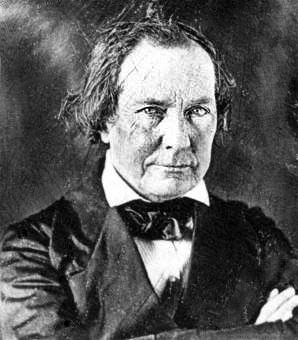
Mirabeau B. Lamar born 16 August

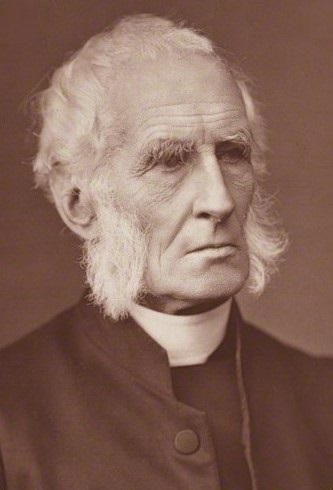
Alfred Ollivant (bishop) born 16 August

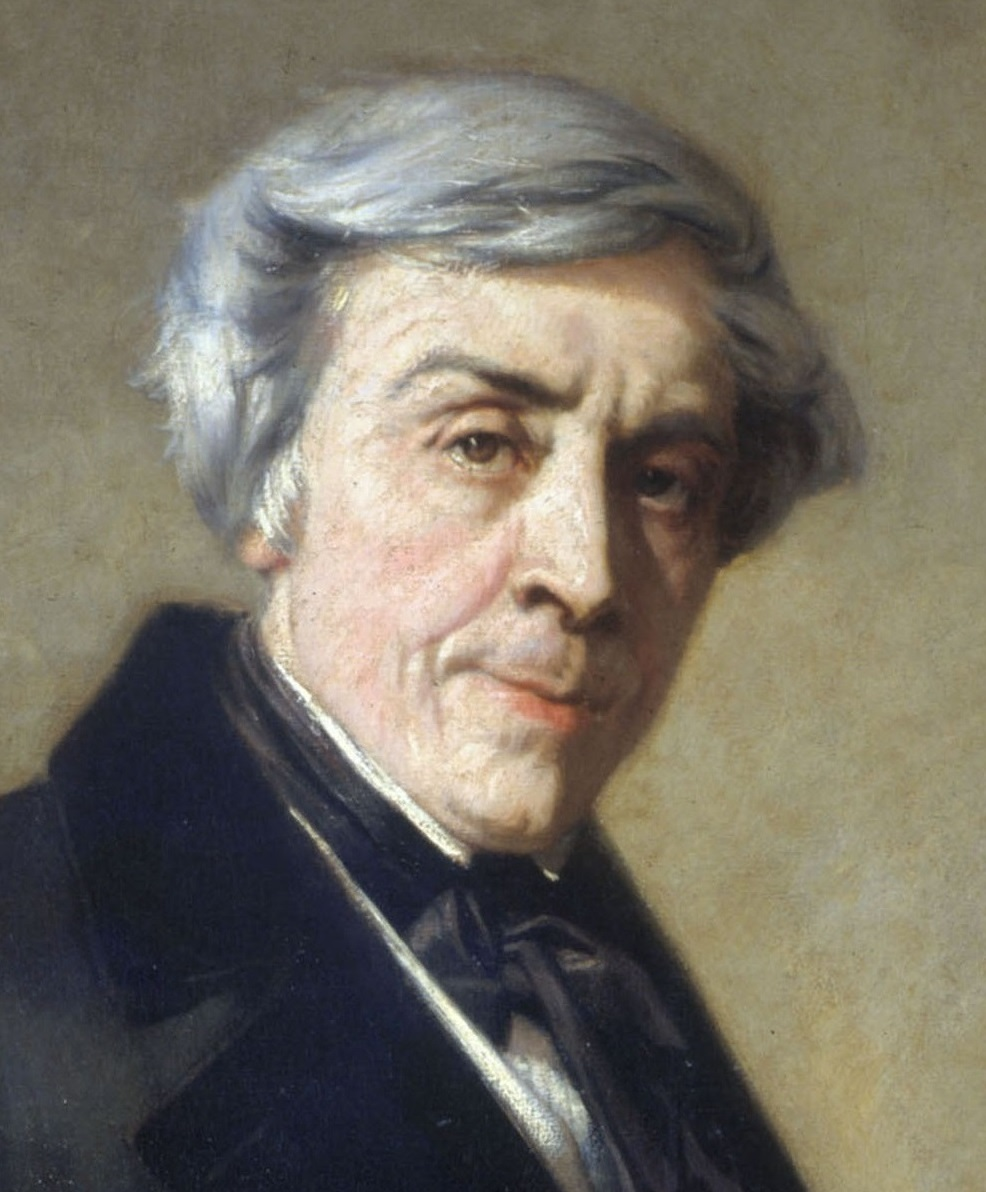
Jules Michelet born 21 August

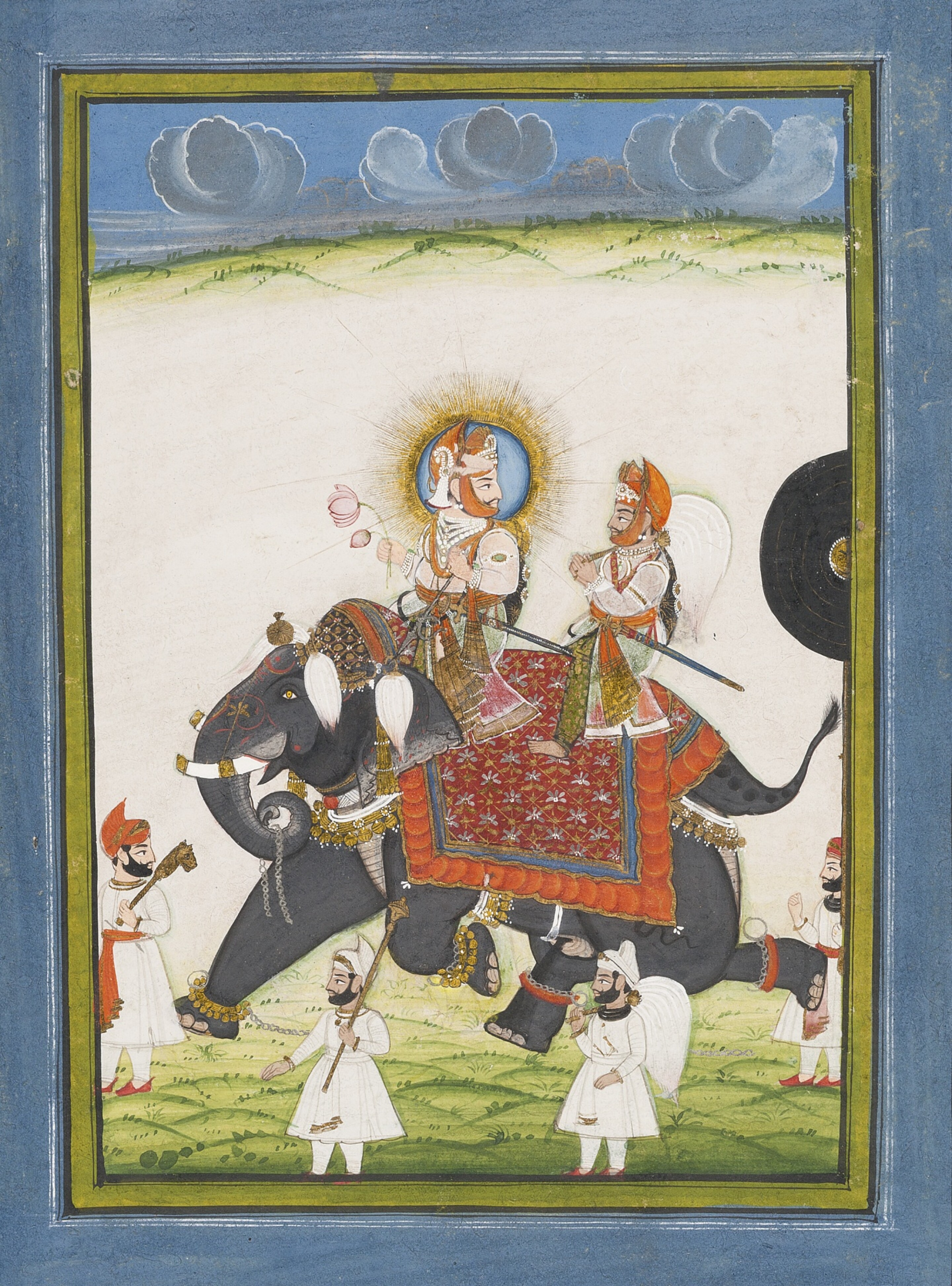
Sardar Singh of Udaipur born 29 August

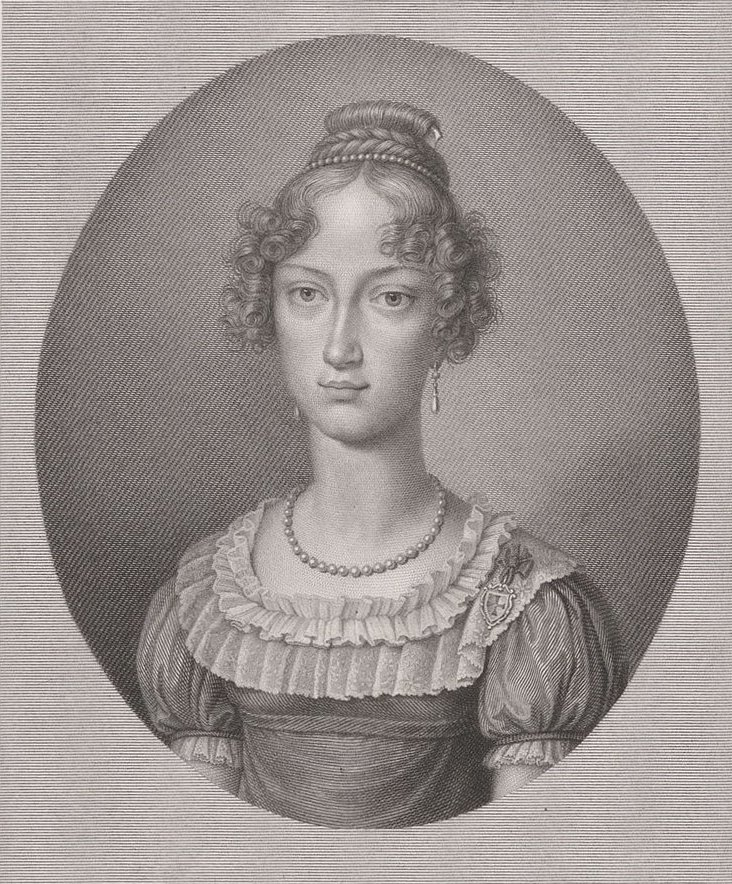
Archduchess Maria Luisa of Austria born 30 August

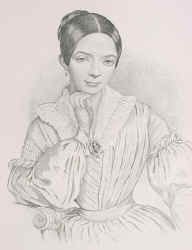
Virginie Déjazet born 30 August

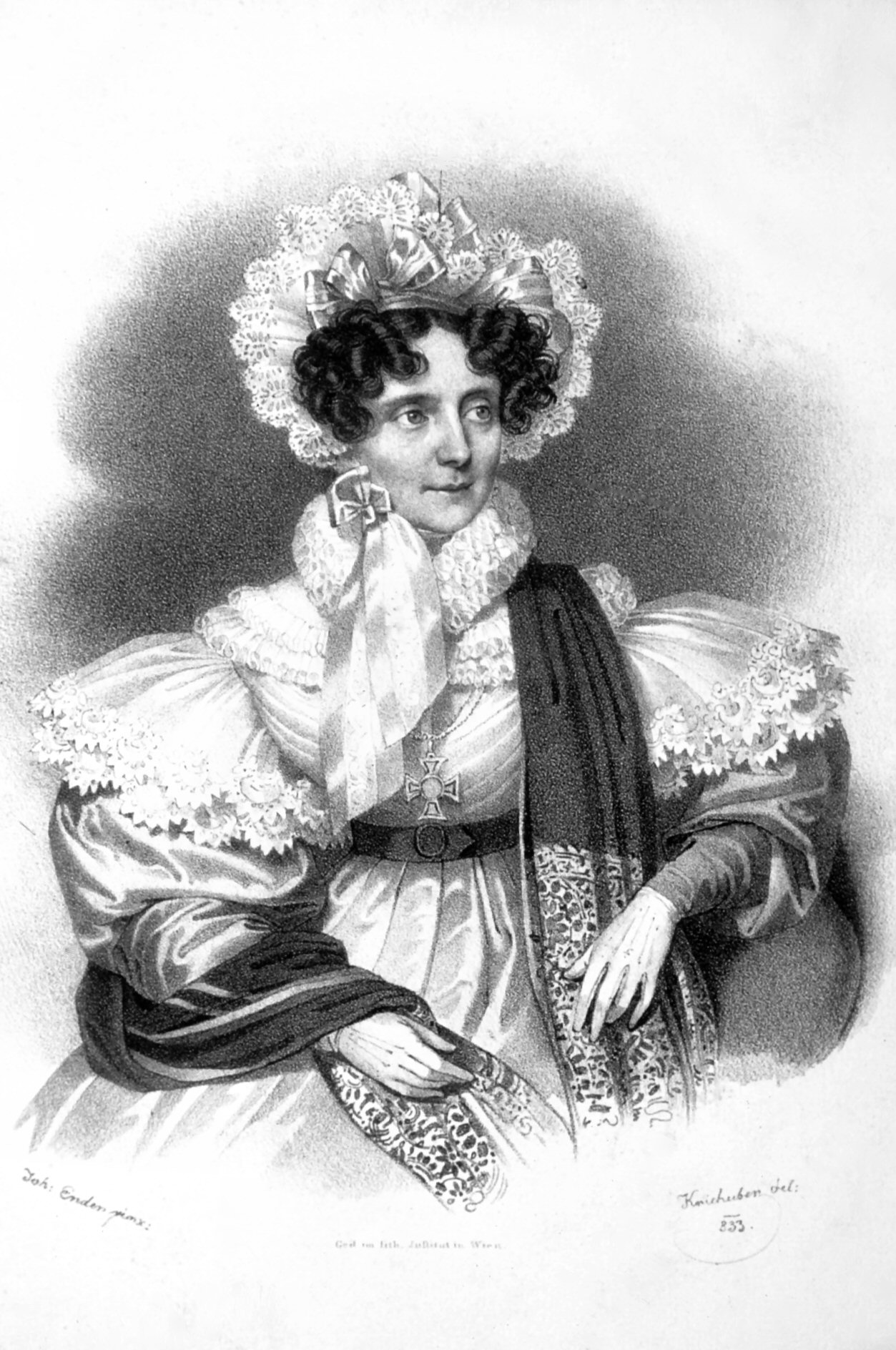
Sophie Esterházy born 5 September

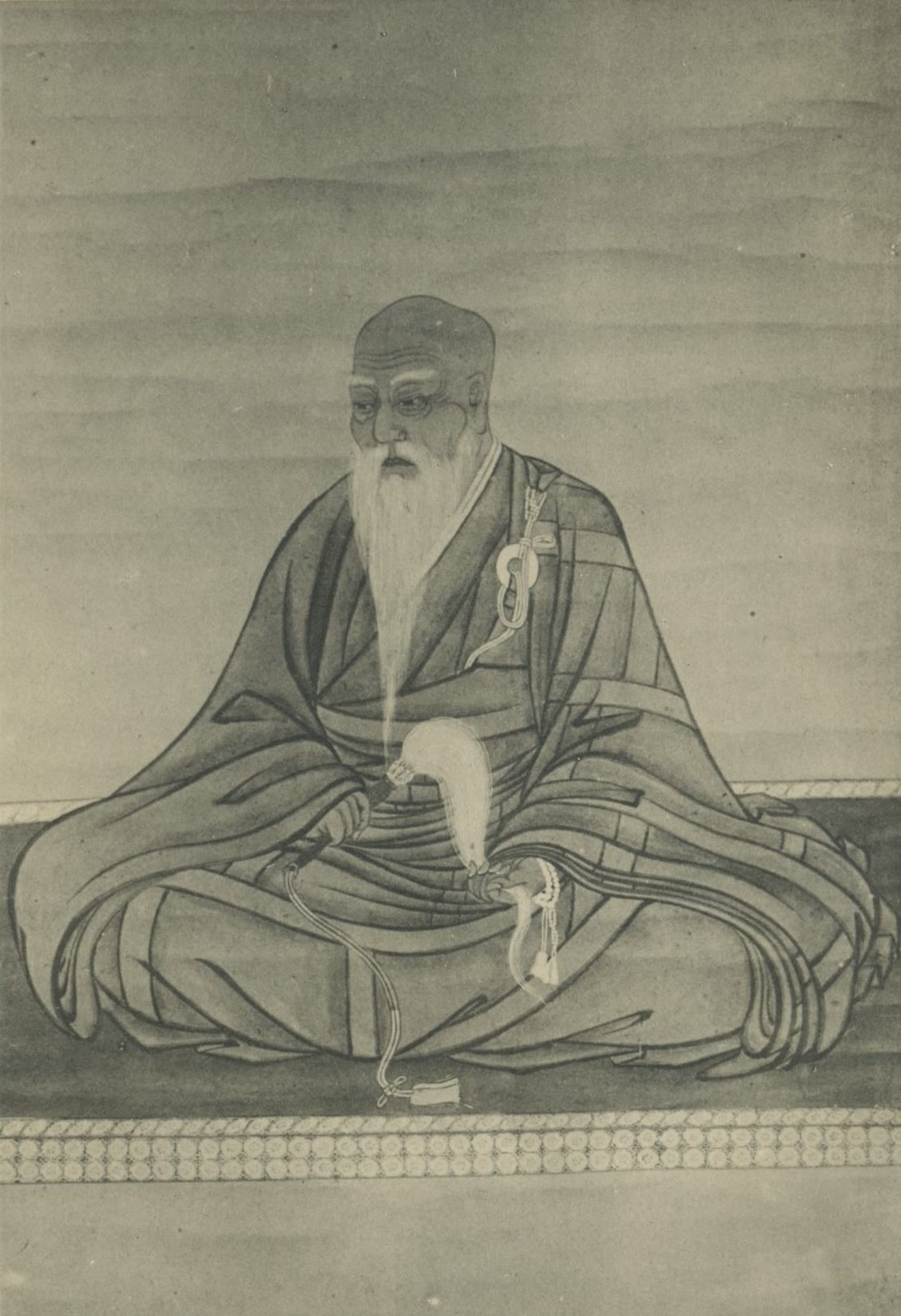
Kujō Hisatada born 5 September

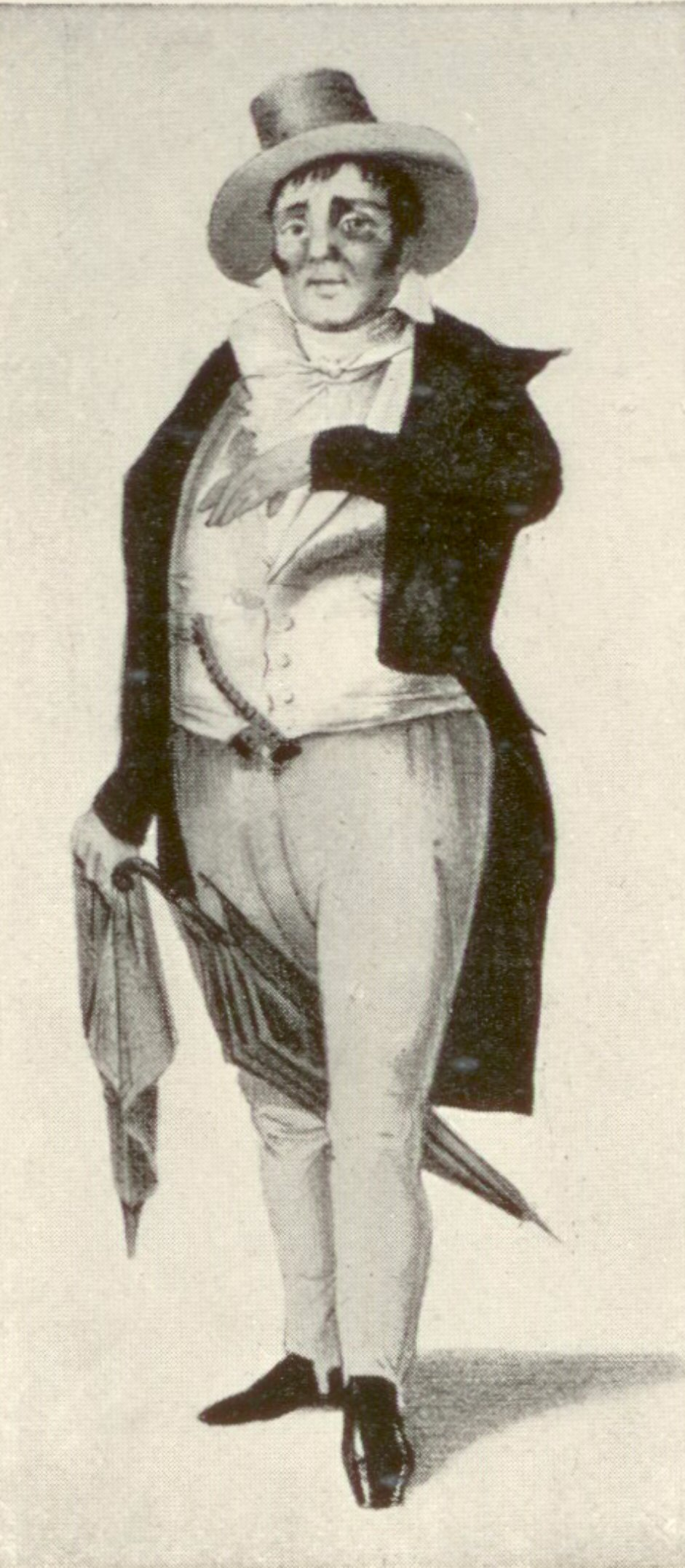
Samuel Friedrich Hassel born 9 September

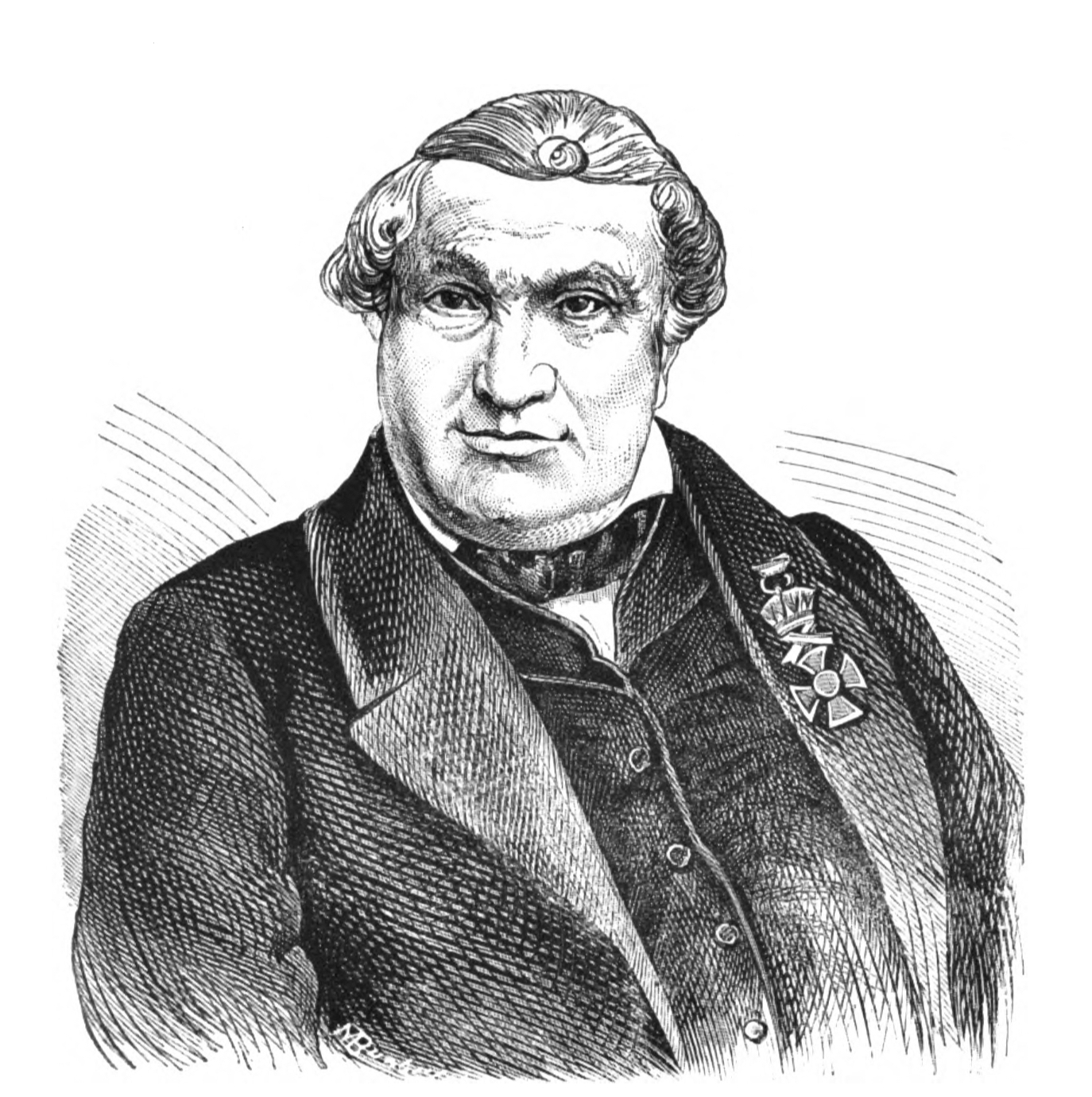
Philipp Schey von Koromla born 20 September

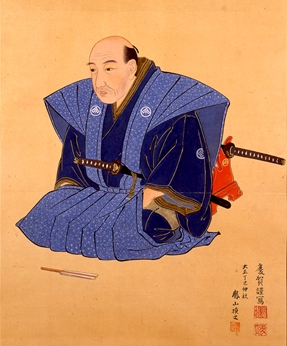
Takashima Shūhan born 24 September

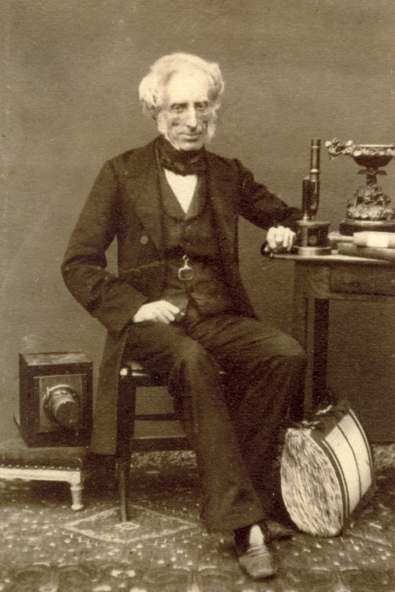
Louis Alphonse de Brébisson born 25 September

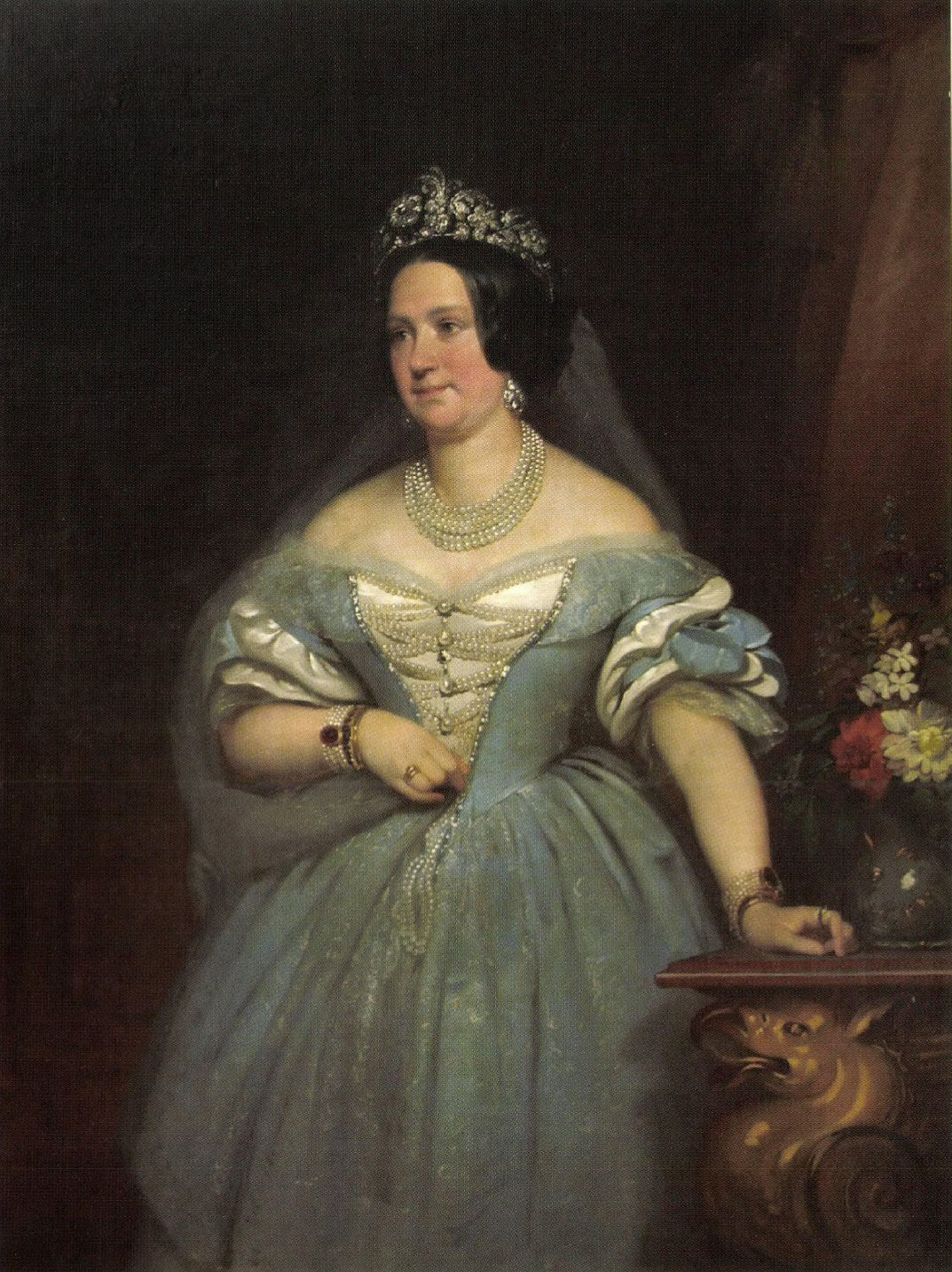
Etelka Szapáry born 26 September

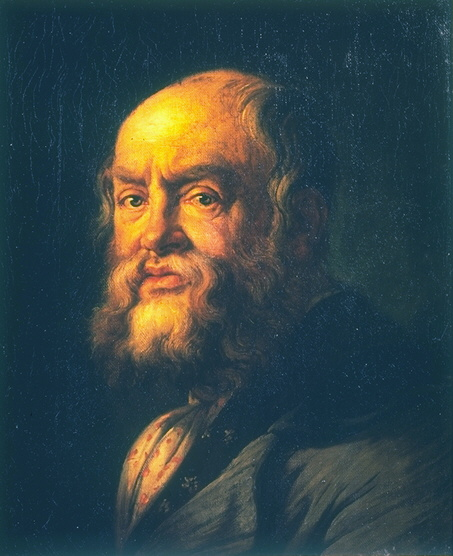
Bonaventura Genelli born 28 September

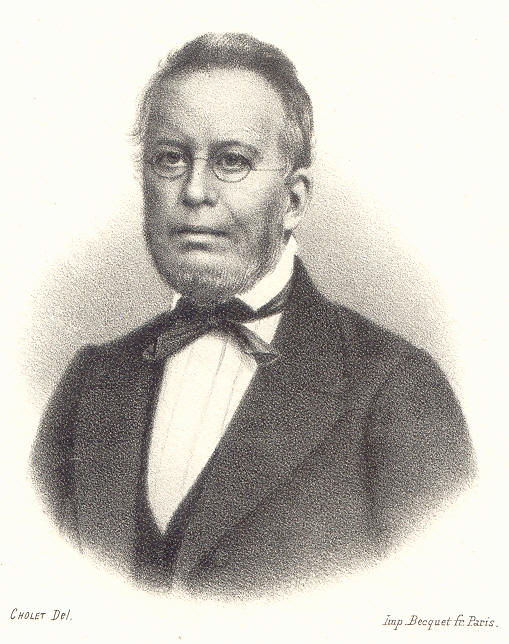
Ange Paulin Terver born 4 October

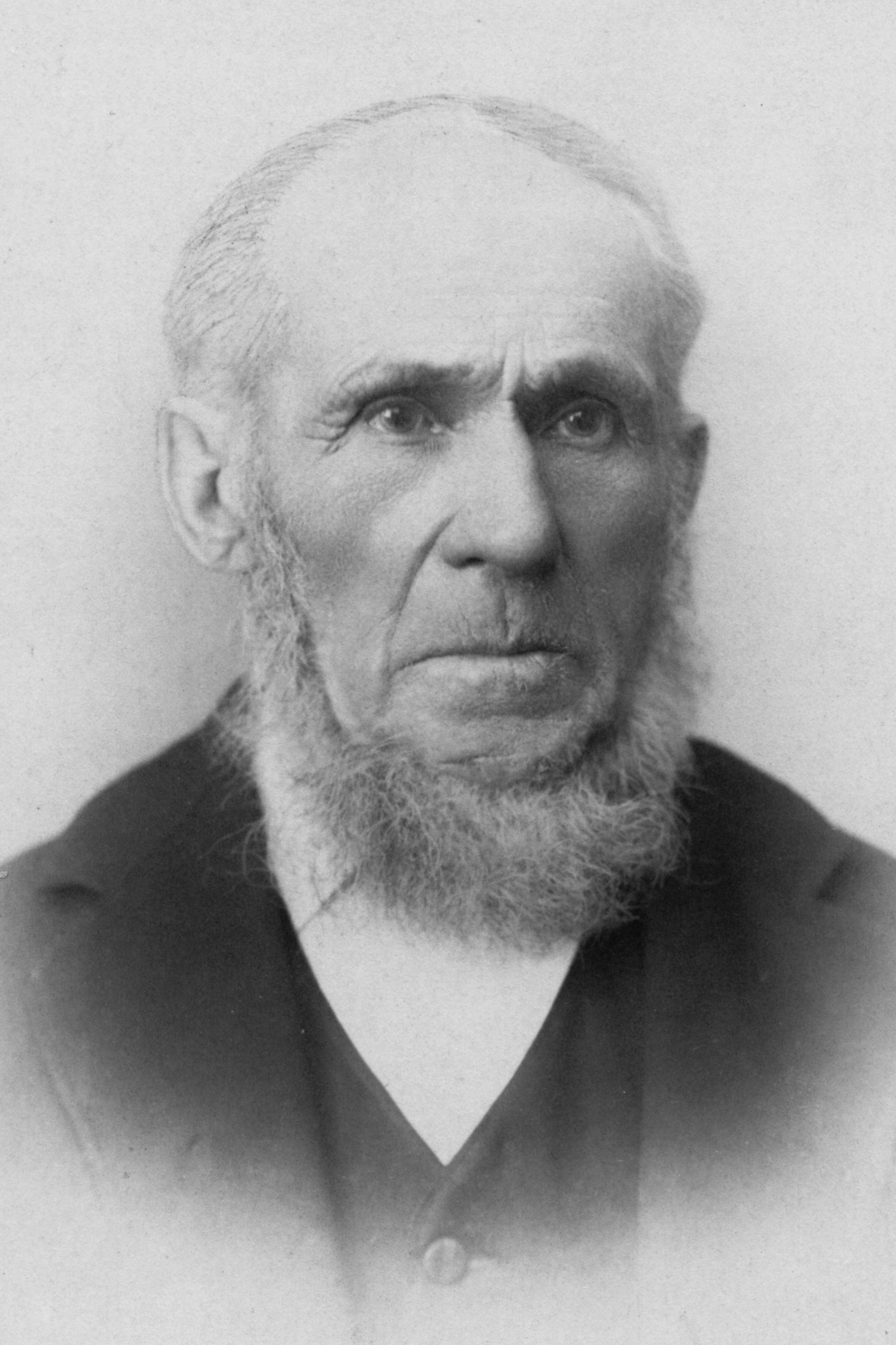
John Byington born 8 October

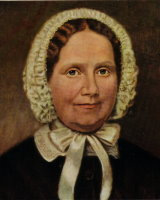
Ida Arenhold born 11 October

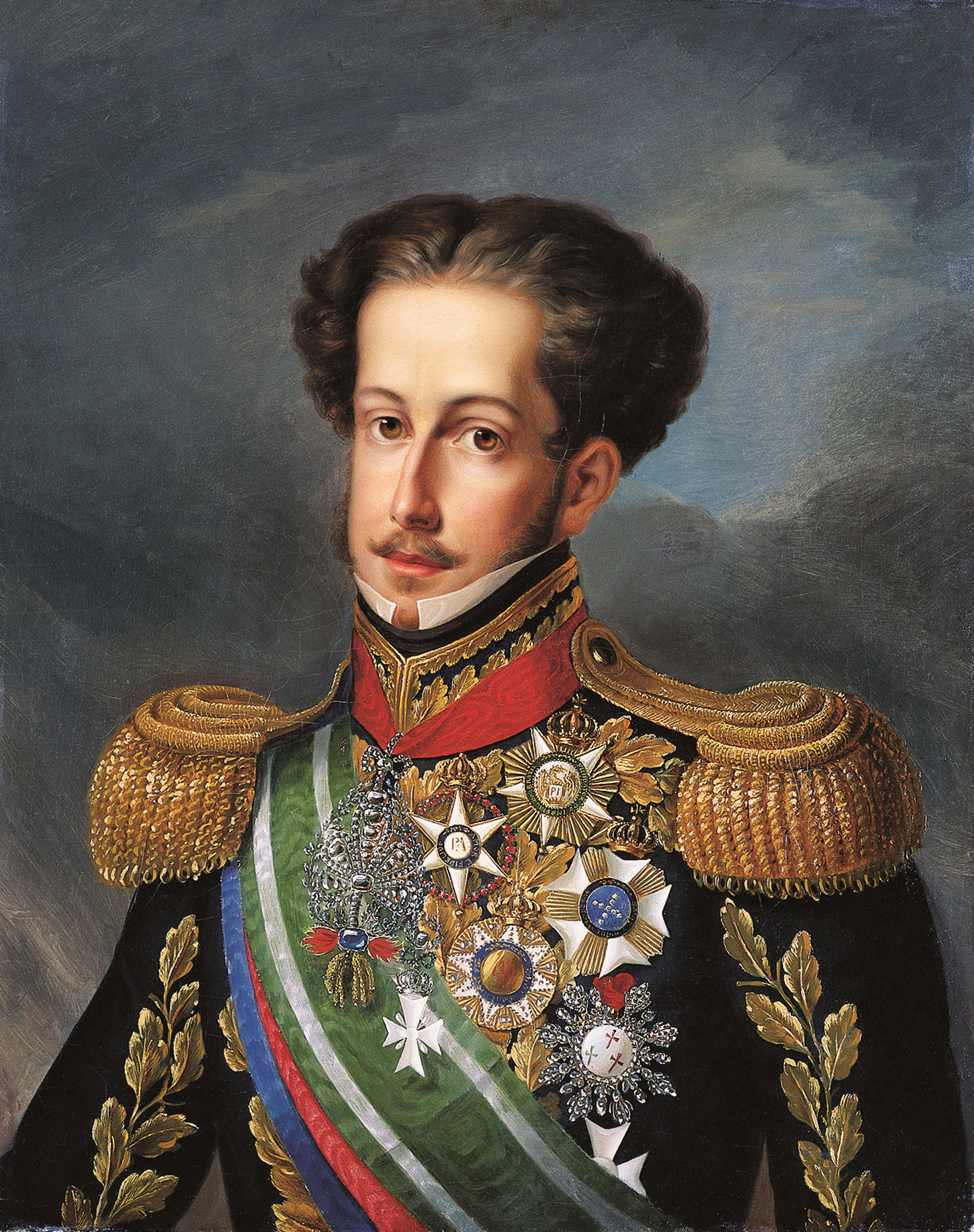
Pedro I of Brazil born 12 October

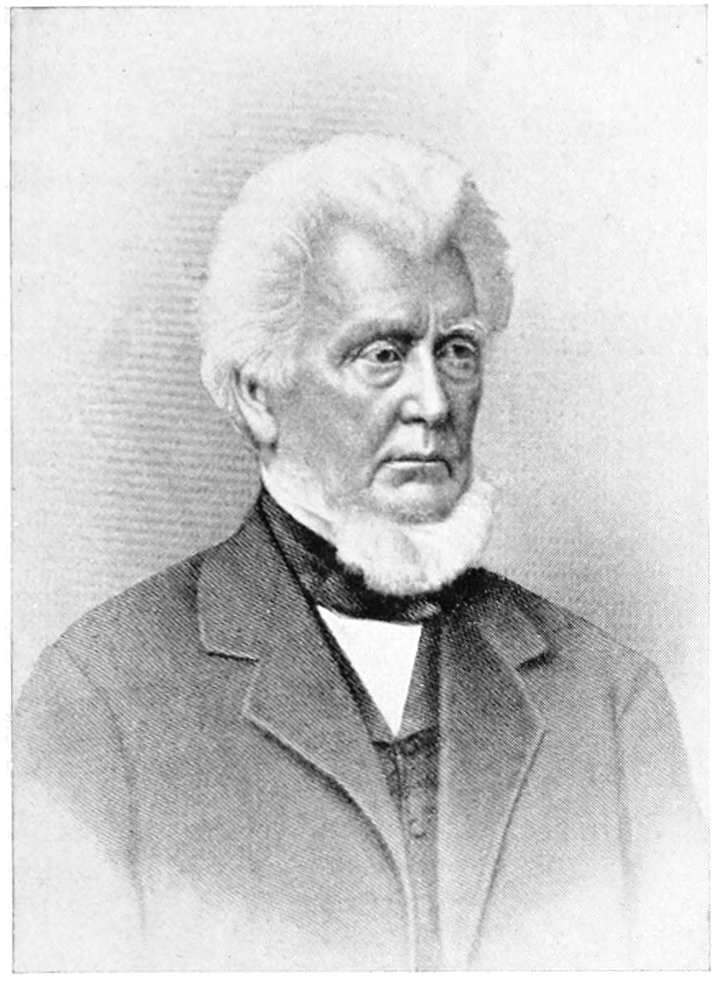
Jesse Olney born 12 October

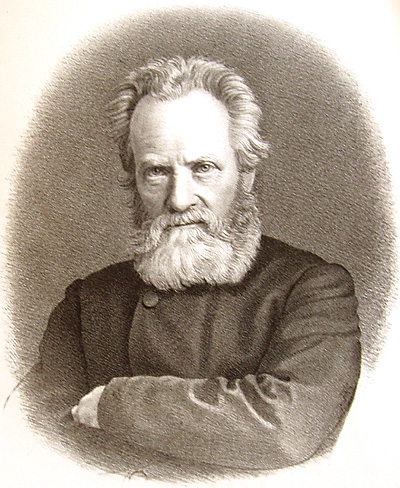
Herman Wilhelm Bissen born 13 October

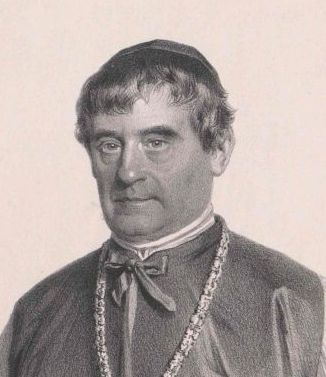
Łukasz Baraniecki born 14 October

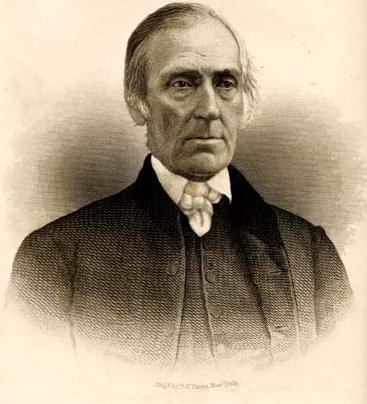
Levi Coffin born 28 October

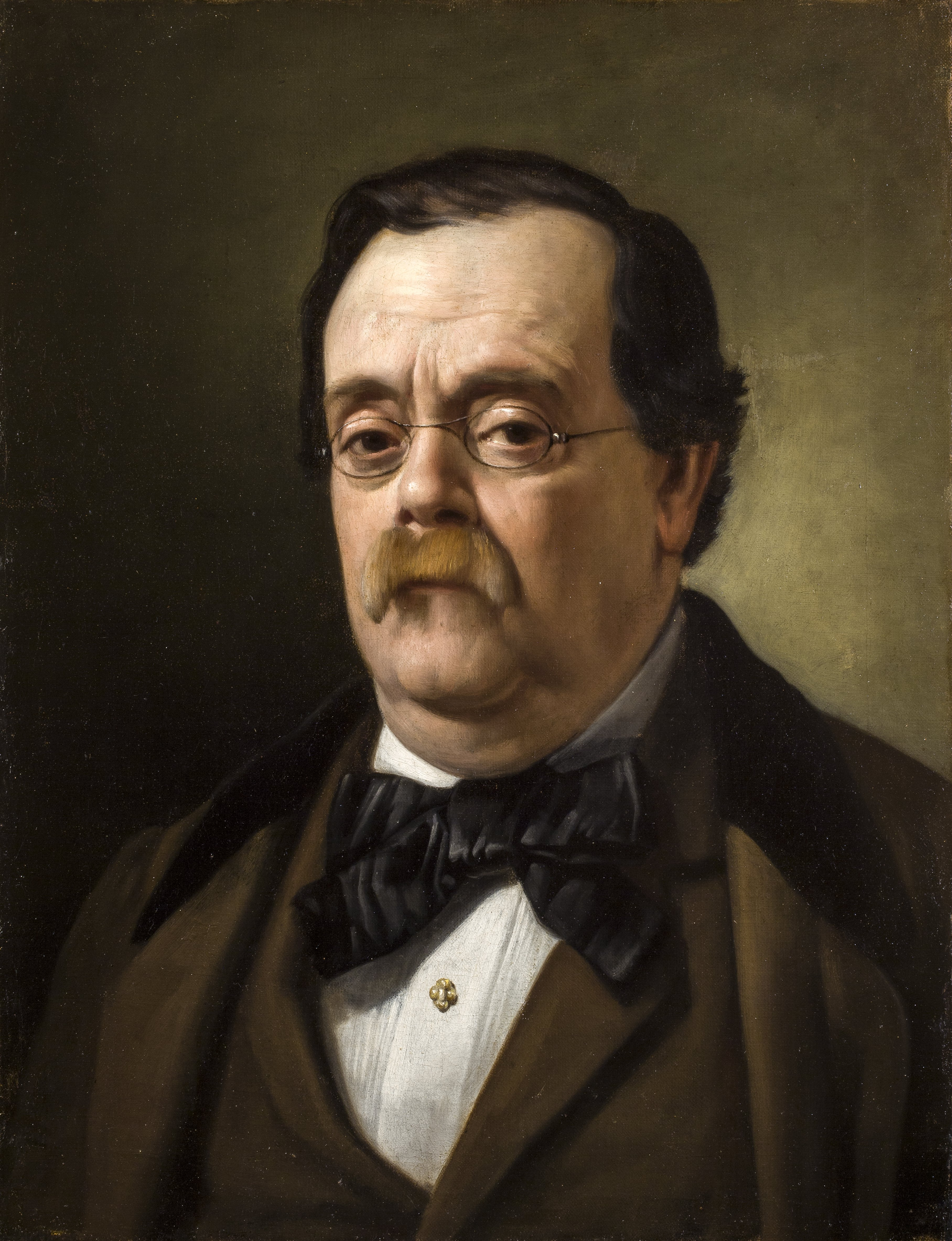
Antonio Cabral Bejarano born 31 October

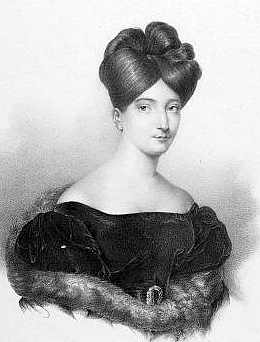
Henriette Méric-Lalande born 4 November

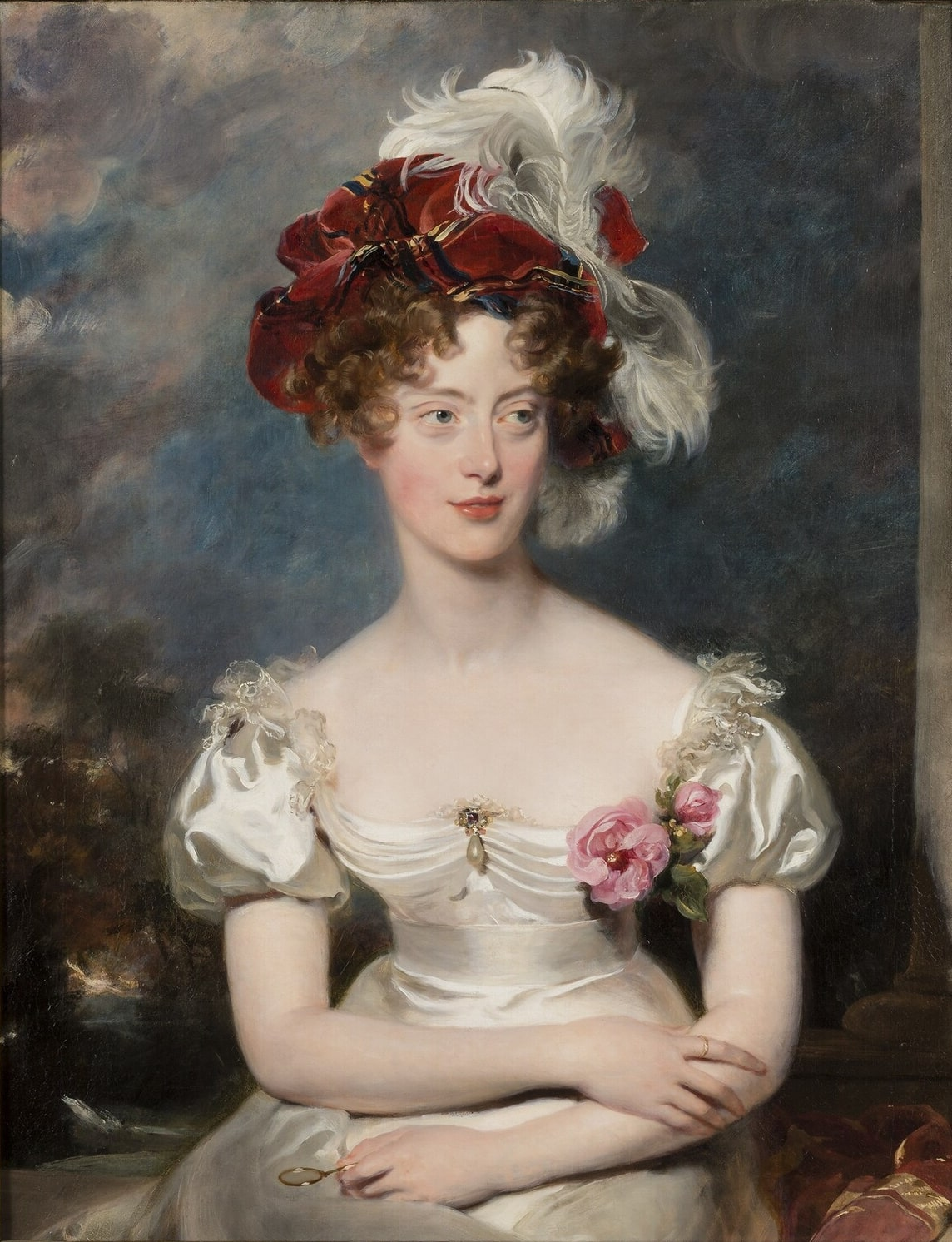
Marie-Caroline of Bourbon-Two Sicilies, Duchess of Berry born 5 November

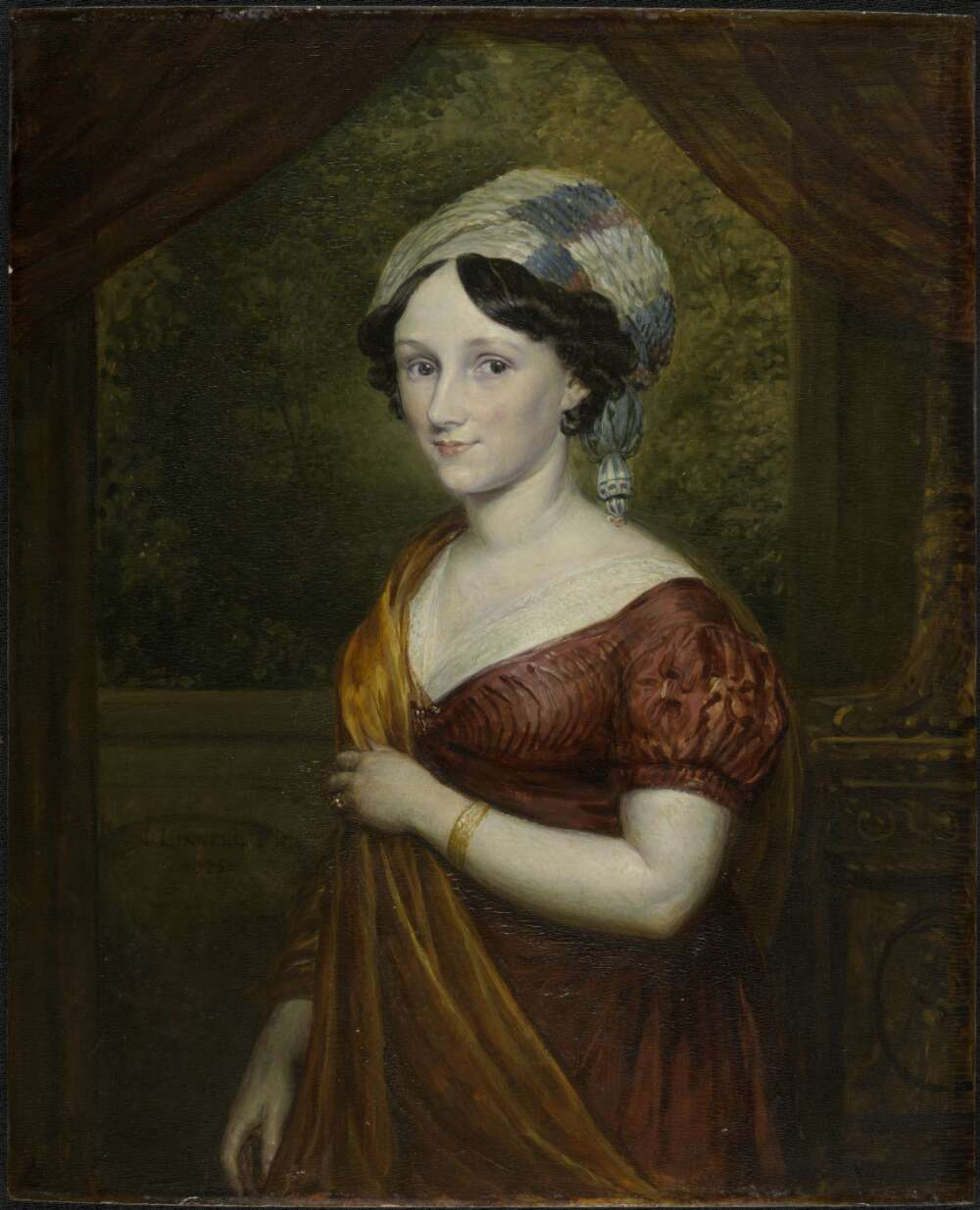
Eliza, Lady Darling born 10 November

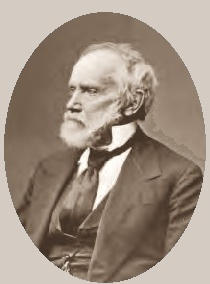
John Amory Lowell born 11 November

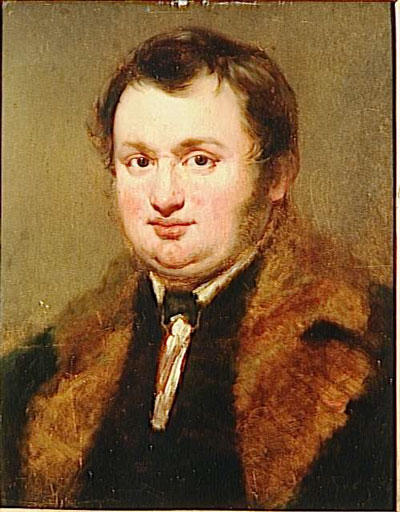
Abel Hugo born 15 November

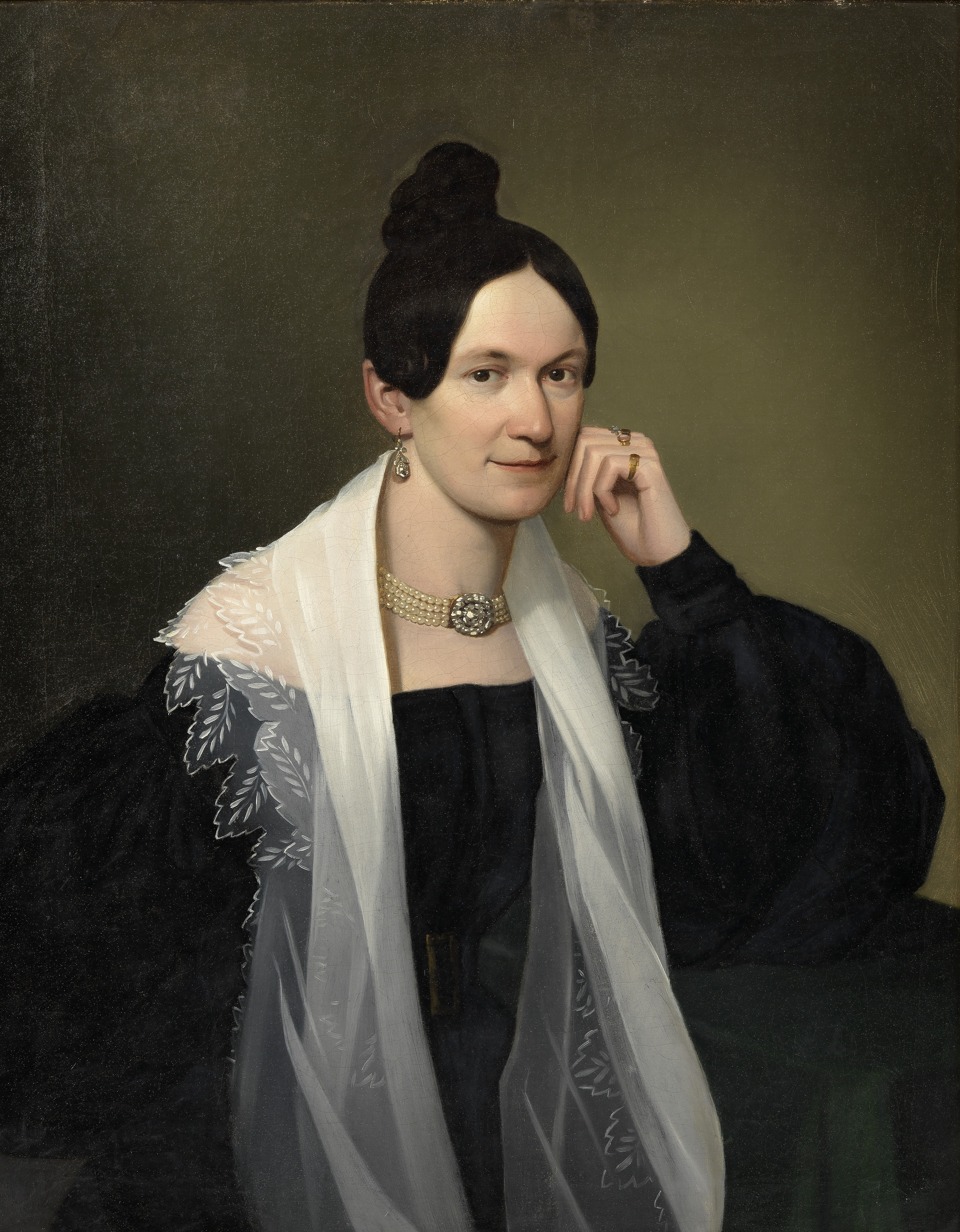
Therese Grob born 16 November

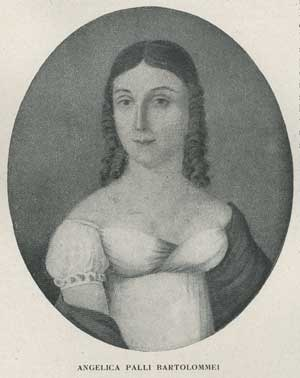
Angeliki Palli born 22 November

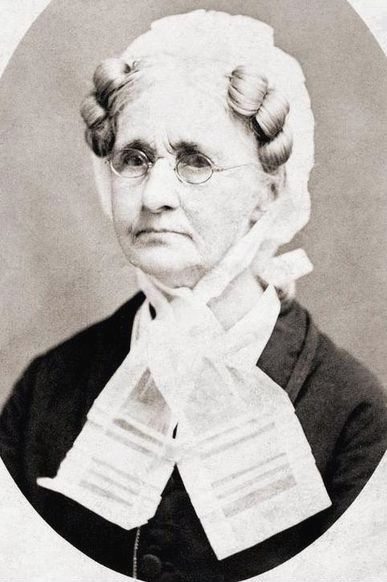
Hannah Simpson Grant born 23 November

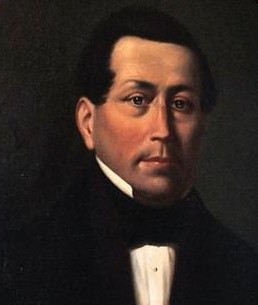
Alonzo Morphy born 23 November

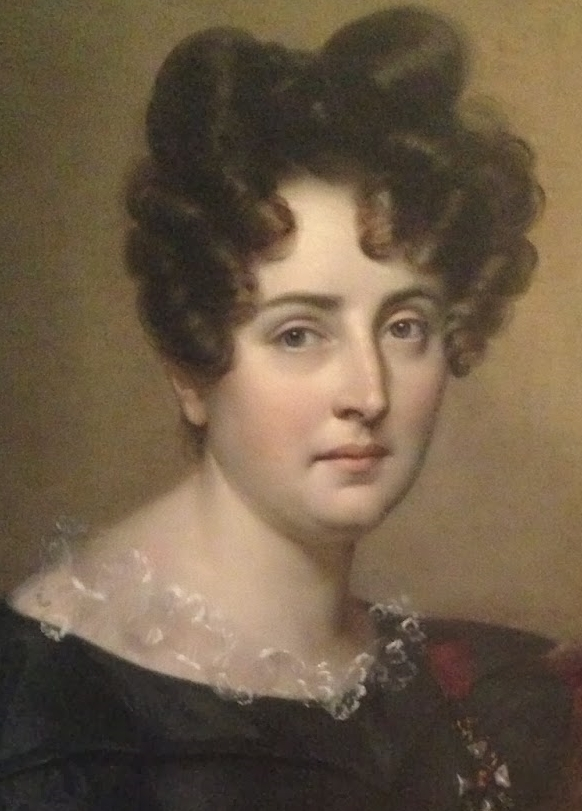
Cora Millet-Robinet born 28 November

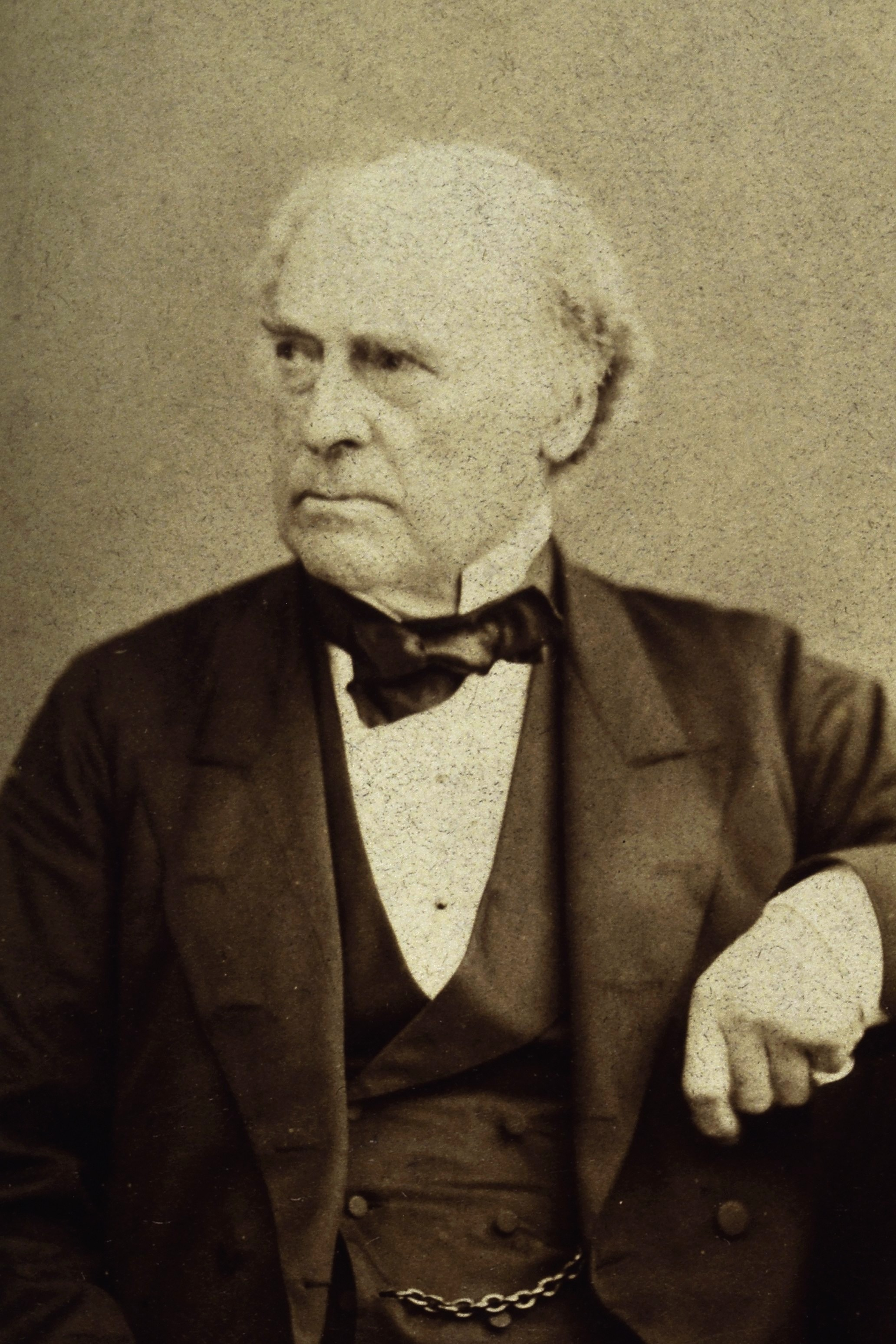
Frederic Carpenter Skey born 1 December

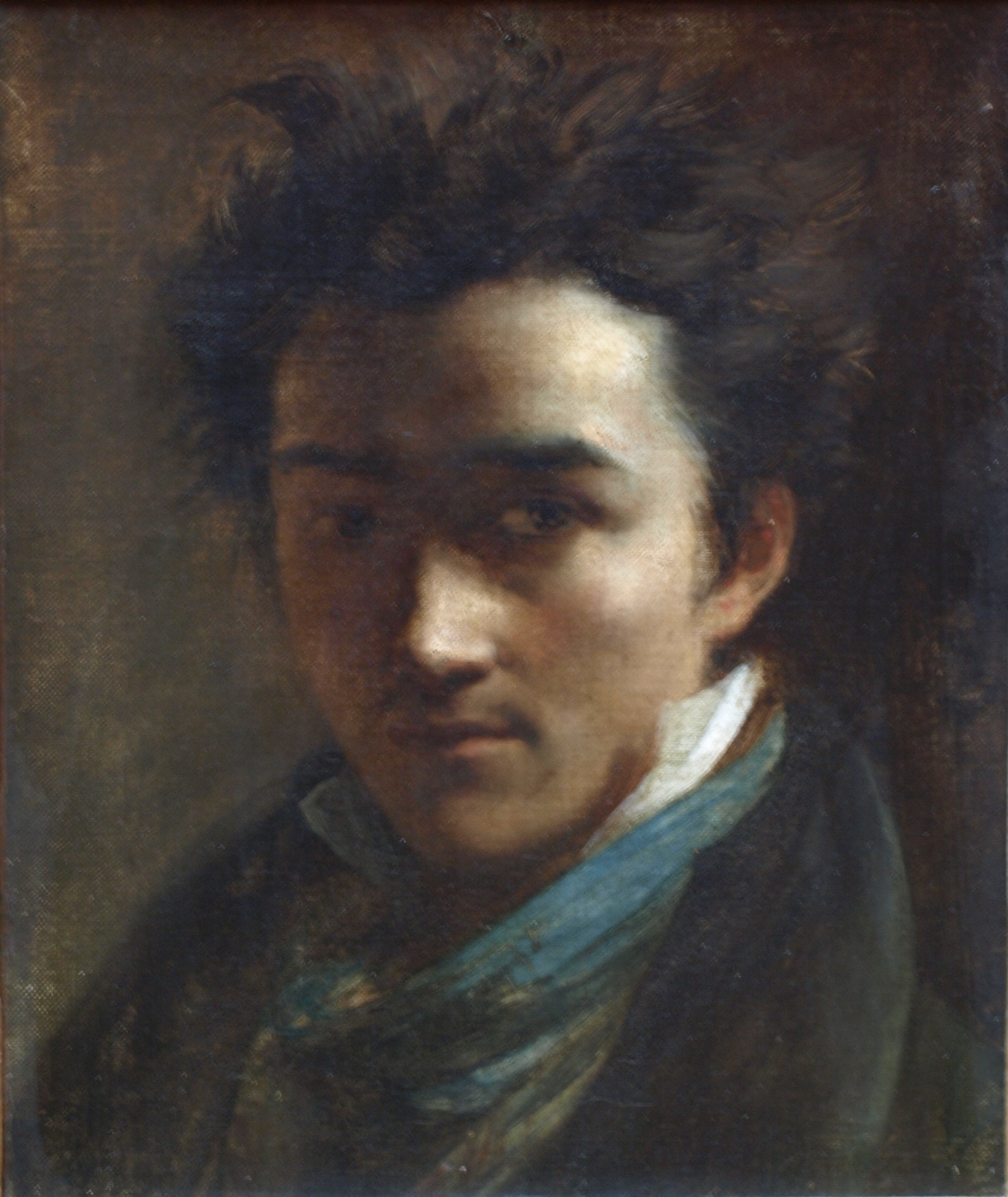
Alexandre-Marie Colin born 5 December

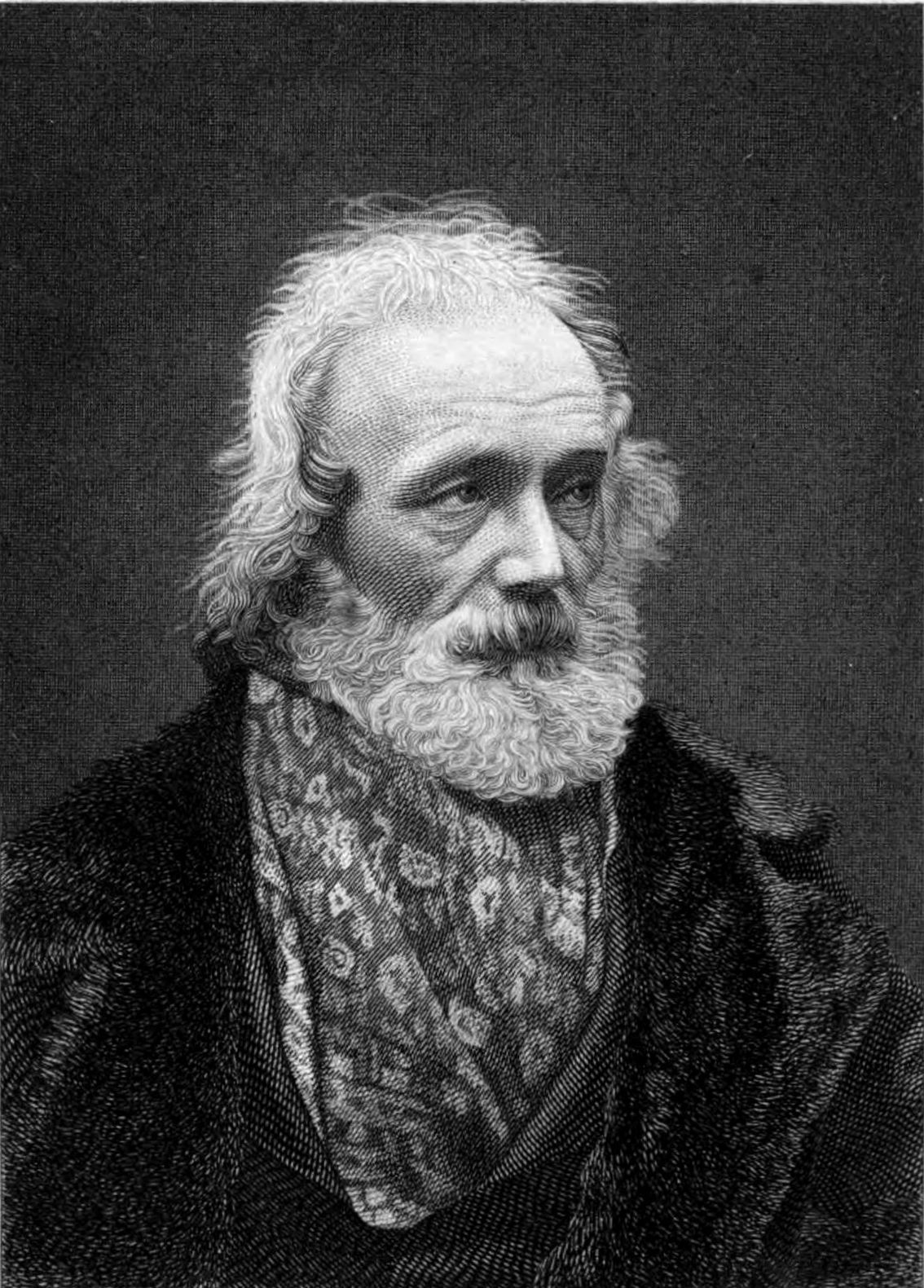
James Henry (poet) born 13 December

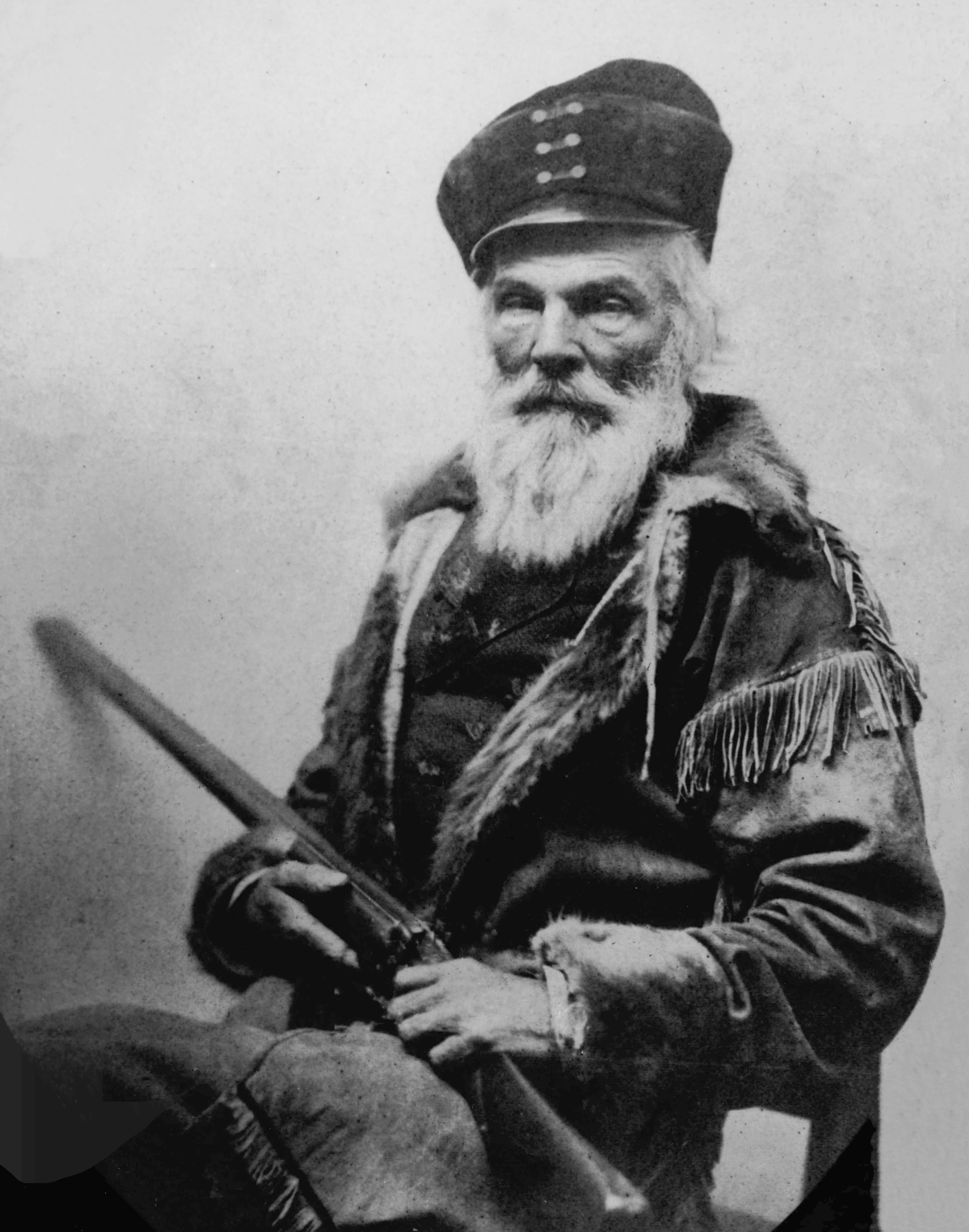
Joseph R. Walker born 13 December

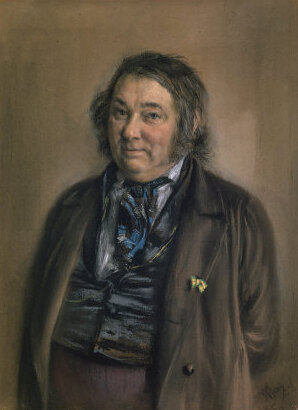
Heinrich Smidt born 18 December

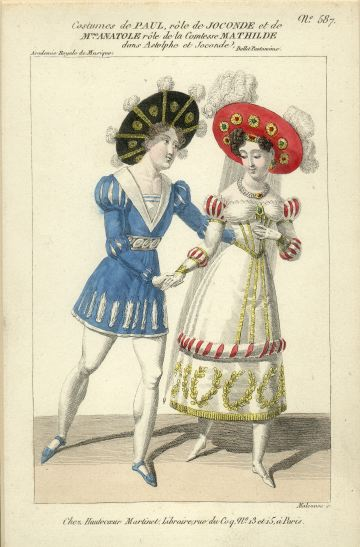
Paul (dancer) born 21 December

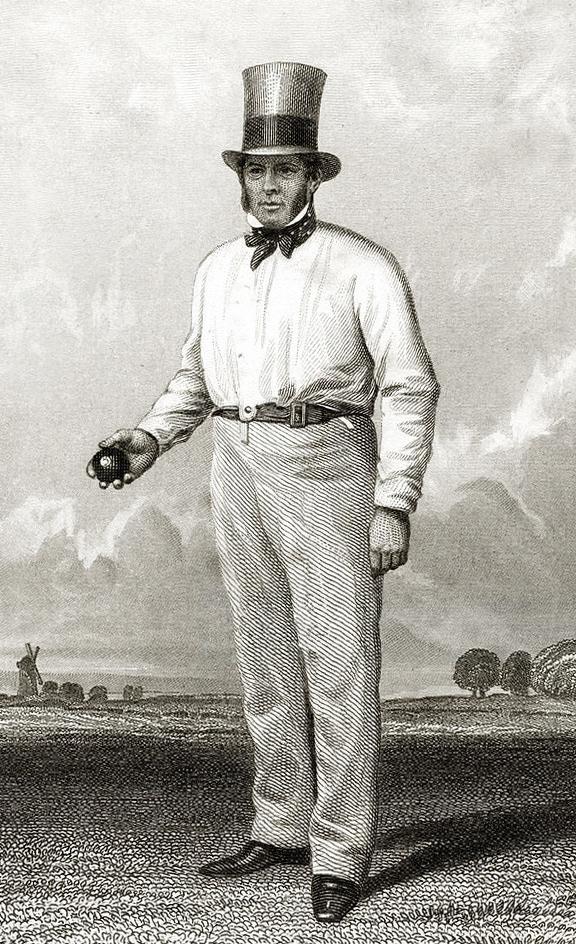
William Clarke born 24 December

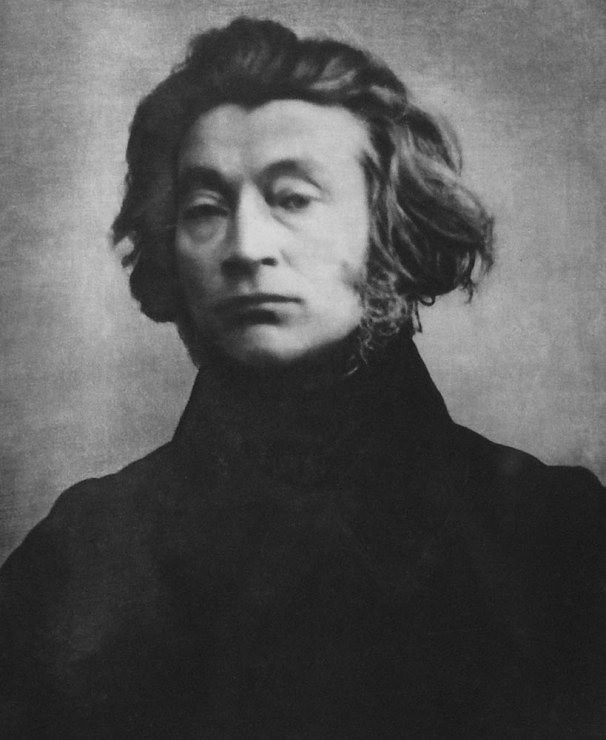
Adam Mickiewicz born 24 December

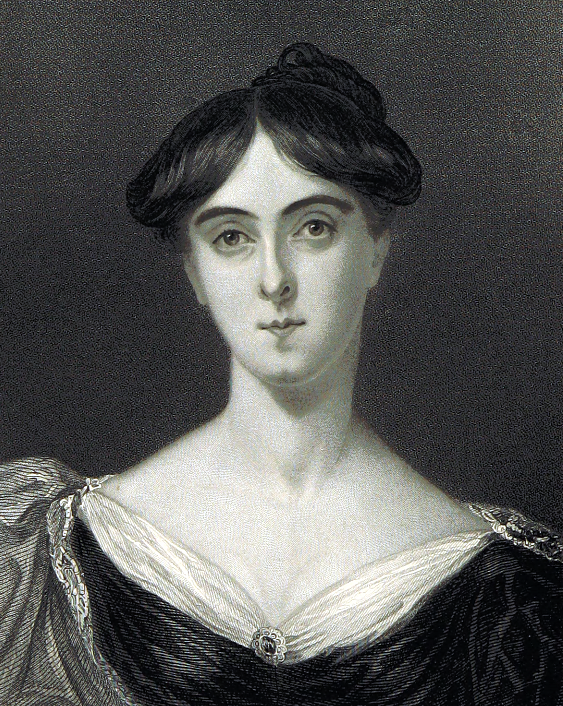
Catherine Grace Godwin born 25 December

=== January ===
- January 1
  - Ryan Brenan, Australian politician, magistrate and coroner (d. 1868)
  - Benjamin Bull, American lawyer and politician (d. 1879)
  - Utagawa Kuniyoshi, Japanese artist (d. 1861)
  - James Macarthur, pastoralist and politician in New South Wales, Australia (d. 1867)
  - Ângelo Carlos Muniz, Brazilian politician (d. 1863)
- January 2 – Désiré-Alexandre Batton, French composer (d. 1855)
- January 4
  - Paul-Adrien Bourdaloue, French civil engineer (d. 1868)
  - William C. Dawson, American politician (d. 1856)
  - Robley Dunglison, physician (d. 1869)
- January 5
  - David Macbeth Moir, Scottish physician and writer (d. 1851)
  - James Semple, American politician from Illinois (d. 1866)
- January 6
  - Melchior von Diepenbrock, Catholic cardinal (d. 1853)
  - Marie Dorval, French actress (d. 1849)
  - Frederick Thellusson, 4th Baron Rendlesham, British politician (d. 1852)
- January 7
  - Giovanni Marghinotti, Italian painter (d. 1865)
  - Marijan Šunjić, Bosnian Franciscan Catholic bishop, writer, scientific and political worker (d. 1860)
- January 8
  - Waddy Thompson Jr., American politician (d. 1868)
  - Giuseppe Rosi, Italian poet and patriot (d. 1891)
  - Robert Meadows White, English priest (d. 1865)
- January 9 – Philippe Joseph Henri Lemaire, French sculptor (d. 1880)
- January 10
  - Carl Heinrich Hertwig, German veterinarian (d. 1881)
  - David P. Mapes, American politician (d. 1890)
  - Federico Sclopis, Italian judge and politician (d. 1878)
- January 14
  - Isaac da Costa, Dutch writer, Jewish poet (d. 1860)
  - William Duncombe, 2nd Baron Feversham, British politician (d. 1867)
  - John Christian Wiltberger Jr., American silversmith and religious activist (d. 1855)
  - Robert N. Martin, American politician (d. 1870)
  - James Swaby, Jamaican man of colour, one of the first non-white commissioned officers in the British Army (d. 1863)
  - Johan Rudolph Thorbecke, Dutch statesman (d. 1872)
- January 15
  - Ammon Brown, American politician (d. 1882)
  - Thomas Crofton Croker, Irish antiquary and artist (d. 1854)
  - Johann Gottlob von Kurr, German pharmacist, botanist and mineralogist (d. 1870)
  - Calvary Morris, American politician (d. 1871)
  - Samuel Stutchbury, British naturalist (d. 1859)
- January 16
  - Chauncey Bulkley, American lawyer (d. 1860)
  - Joshua King, British mathematician (d. 1857)
- January 17
  - Lea Birch, English cricketer (d. 1868)
  - Sir Theodore Brinckman, 1st Baronet, British politician (d. 1880)
  - André Friedrich, French sculptor (d. 1877)
  - Jean-Baptiste Masui, Belgian engineer (d. 1860)
- January 18
  - Augustus Seymour Porter, American politician (d. 1872)
  - William Bennett Webster, Canadian politician (d. 1861)
  - Christian Whitmer, Book of Mormon witness (d. 1835)
- January 19
  - Auguste Comte, French philosopher, pioneer of positivism (d. 1857)
  - Samuel Worcester, Christian missionary to Cherokee, civil rights advocate (d. 1859)
- January 20
  - Anson Jones, 5th and last President of the Republic of Texas (d. 1858)
  - Charles Varin, French writer (d. 1869)
- January 21 – Jane Williams, Shelley's muse (d. 1884)
- January 22
  - Charles Davies, American mathematician (d. 1876)
  - Robert Unwin Harwood, Canadian politician (d. 1863)
  - Ciro Menotti, Italian patriot (d. 1831)
- January 23 – Joan Cornelis Reynst, Dutch politician (d. 1871)
- January 24
  - Henry Addison, American mayor (d. 1870)
  - Théodore Caruelle d'Aligny, French painter (d. 1871)
  - Karl von Holtei, German actor (d. 1880)
  - Karl Georg Christian von Staudt, German geometer (d. 1867)
- January 25 – Richard William Jelf, British academic (d. 1871)
- January 27
  - George Clarke, New Zealand missionary, teacher, public servant, politician, judge (d. 1875)
  - Thekchok Dorje, 14th Karmapa Lama, Tibetan Lama (d. 1868)
  - Darius Mead, American politician (d. 1859)
- January 28
  - Henry J. Ripley, American baptist clergyman and biblical scholar (d. 1875)
  - Marcus Sandys, 3rd Baron Sandys, British politician (d. 1863)
  - Basil Manly Sr., American minister (d. 1868)
- January 29
  - Patrick Bellew, 1st Baron Bellew, British politician (d. 1866)
  - Simeon Borden, American civil engineer (d. 1856)
  - Henry Neele, poet (d. 1828)
- January 30
  - Manuel Francisco Pavón Aycinena, conservative Guatemalan politician (d. 1855)
  - Barker Burnell, American politician (d. 1843)
  - Daniel Bailey Ryall, American politician (d. 1864)
- January 31
  - Hans Ernst Krøyer, Danish composer (d. 1879)
  - Carl Gottlieb Reissiger, German musician (d. 1859)
  - John Summerfield, Methodist evangelist, co-founder American Tract Society (d. 1825)
  - Ana Gruzinskaya Tolstaya, Georgian princess (d. 1889)

=== February ===
- February 1
  - Hannah Bevan, English philanthropist (d. 1874)
  - Willard Chase, American treasure hunter (d. 1871)
- February 2
  - John Warner Barber, American historian (d. 1885)
  - John Brogden, British railway contractor and promoter (d. 1869)
  - Stephen Mack Jr., American pioneer (d. 1850)
  - Bernard Jullien, linguist (d. 1881)
  - Henry Robinson-Montagu, 6th Baron Rokeby, British Army general (d. 1883)
- February 3
  - William Hill, Irish architect (d. 1844)
  - Nathaniel Morren, Church of Scotland minister and church historian (d. 1847)
  - Daniel Sandford, Scottish politician and Greek scholar (d. 1838)
  - Christian Julius Wilhelm Schiede, German botanist (d. 1836)
- February 4
  - John Cochrane, Scottish lawyer and chess player (d. 1878)
  - Calvin Fletcher, American judge (d. 1866)
  - Adrian Janes, American businessman (d. 1869)
  - Otani Nobutomo, Japanese martial artist (d. 1864)
- February 5
  - Olympe-Philippe Gerbet, French bishop (d. 1864)
  - Pierre-Gustave Joly de Lotbinière, French businessman and photographer (d. 1865)
  - George James Turner, English judge and politician (d. 1867)
- February 6
  - Charles Dupeuty, French librettist and playwright (d. 1865)
  - James Saurin, Anglican priest, Archdeacon of Dromore (d. 1879)
- February 7
  - Eugène Goyet, French painter (d. 1857)
  - Bolette Puggaard, Danish painter (d. 1847)
  - William Tite, British architect and politician (d. 1873)
  - Harriet Waylett, English actress and theatre manager (d. 1851)
- February 8 – Grand Duke Michael Pavlovich of Russia, Russian Grand Duke (d. 1849)
- February 9
  - John Farmer, American educator and cartographer (d. 1859)
  - Christian Friedrich Koch, German writer (d. 1872)
  - Abel Stearns, American mayor (d. 1871)
- February 10 – Niels Nielsen Vogt, Norwegian politician (d. 1869)
- February 11
  - James Bacon, British judge (d. 1895)
  - Johann Schroth, Austrian physician (d. 1856)
  - Alvin Smith, Later Day Saints Smith family member (d. 1823)
  - Joseph Vann, Cherokee leader and businessman (d. 1844)
- February 12 – Edward John Carlos, English writer on architecture (d. 1851)
- February 13
  - Heinrich Alexander von Arnim, Prussian statesman (d. 1861)
  - Samuel Dunn, British minister (d. 1882)
  - Jules Renouard, French publisher and private banker (d. 1854)
- February 14
  - Benjamin Tett, politician (d. 1878)
  - Prosper Wetmore, author (d. 1876)
  - Searles Valentine Wood, English palaeontologist (d. 1880)
- February 15
  - Heinrich Beitzke, German historian (d. 1867)
  - Marie-Guillaume-Alphonse Devergie, French dermatologist (d. 1879)
  - Jean Étienne Duby, Swiss clergyman and botanist (d. 1885)
- February 16 – Richard Mills, English cricketer (d. 1882)
- February 17
  - Friedrich Eduard Beneke, German psychologist & scholar (d. 1854)
  - Charles Macalester, American businessman, banker and philanthropist (d. 1873)
  - Josef Matěj Navrátil, Czech painter (d. 1865)
  - Ann Agnes Trail, Roman Catholic nun and artist (d. 1872)
- February 18
  - Adalbert von Ladenberg, Prussian politician (d. 1855)
  - José Hilario López, President of Colombia (d. 1869)
- February 19
  - William Best, 2nd Baron Wynford, British Baron and politician (d. 1869)
  - Allan MacNab, Canadian politician (d. 1862)
- February 20
  - Adolf Ferdinand Wenceslaus Brix, German mathematician (d. 1870)
  - Richard M. Young, American politician (d. 1861)
- February 21
  - John William Bowden, British minister (d. 1844)
  - Wilhelm Esser, German philosopher, classical philologist, university teacher (d. 1854)
  - Lubize, French playwright (d. 1863)
- February 22
  - Samuel Price Carson, American politician and farmer (d. 1838)
  - Gustave Drouineau, French playwright (d. 1878)
  - Charles Émile Seurre, French artist (d. 1858)
  - Charles Mynn Thruston, Union Army general (d. 1873)
- February 23 – Ichabod Spencer, American minister (d. 1854)
- February 24 – Daniel Massey, blacksmith, businessman (d. 1856)
- February 25
  - William Claiborne Dunlap, American politician (d. 1872)
  - Thomas Napier Thomson, Scottish minister and writer (d. 1869)
- February 26 – Amy and Isaac Post, Hicksite Quakers from New York (d. 1872)
- February 27
  - Marshall Chapin, American mayor (d. 1836)
  - Daniel Wakefield, judge in New Zealand (d. 1858)
- February 28
  - Étienne Rouchouze, Missionary and bishop (d. 1843)
  - Johann Jakob Ulrich, painter from Switzerland (d. 1877)

=== March ===
- March 1
  - Princess Louise of Anhalt-Dessau (d. 1858)
  - Archduchess Clementina of Austria (d. 1881)
  - Gregory VI of Constantinople, patriarch of Constantinople (d. 1881)
- March 2
  - Robert Fox, British antiquarian (d. 1843)
  - William Ketchum, 14th mayor of Buffalo, NY (d. 1876)
- March 3 – Daniel Eliott, British translator (d. 1872)
- March 4
  - John Joseph Abercrombie, Union Army general (d. 1877)
  - Sigurður Breiðfjörð, Icelandic poet (d. 1846)
  - John Nicholson Campbell, Chaplain of the US House of Representatives (d. 1864)
  - Charles Dezobry, French writer and historian (d. 1871)
  - Giovanni Inchindi, opera singer (d. 1876)
- March 5
  - Richard Bond, American architect (d. 1861)
  - Samuel Atkins Eliot, US politician (d. 1862)
  - William Greenway, English cricketer (d. 1868)
- March 6
  - Gottlieb Göttlich, German intersex man (d. 1832)
  - Jacques Jasmin, Occitan poet (d. 1864)
  - George R. Noyes, American scholar (d. 1868)
- March 8
  - Mathew Caldwell, Texan settler (d. 1842)
  - Heinrich Wilhelm Ferdinand Wackenroder, German chemist (d. 1854)
- March 9
  - Mathilda Berwald, Finnish and Swedish concert singer (d. 1877)
  - Udagawa Yōan, Japanese scientist (d. 1846)
- March 10
  - John Holladay, American Mormon pioneer (d. 1862)
  - Pierre Frédéric Sarrus, French mathematician (d. 1861)
- March 11
  - Thomas Fremantle, 1st Baron Cottesloe, British politician (d. 1890)
  - Jan Gaykema Jacobsz., Dutch painter and draughtsman of plants (d. 1875)
- March 12
  - Charles Abbot, 2nd Baron Colchester, British Royal Navy admiral (d. 1867)
  - Elizabeth Goodridge, American artist (d. 1882)
  - Ivan Sherwood Verny, Russian Imperial Army officer of English descent (d. 1867)
- March 13
  - Abigail Fillmore, wife of US President Millard Fillmore (d. 1853)
  - Walter Hook, English cleric, Dean of Chichester (d. 1875)
  - Robert Clark Morgan, British missionary (d. 1864)
  - Charles des Moulins, French botanist and malacologist (d. 1875)
  - Friedrich Christian Gregor Wernekinck, German anatomist (d. 1835)
- March 15
  - Michael Pease Calvert, British painter (d. 1875)
  - William Pickering, Governor of Washington territory (d. 1873)
- March 17
  - John Samuel Blunt, American painter (d. 1835)
  - John Bennett Dawson, American politician (d. 1845)
  - Jacob Ettlinger, German rabbi (d. 1871)
  - John Lofland, American writer (d. 1849)
- March 18
  - Henry B. Cowles, American politician (d. 1873)
  - Robert Milner Echols, American politician, soldier (d. 1847)
  - Daniel Frederik Eschricht, Danish physician and zoologist (d. 1863)
  - Francis Lieber, German-American jurist, gymnast and political philosopher (d. 1872)
  - Mubarez-ud-Daulah, member of the Asaf Jahi dynasty of Hyderabad State (d. 1854)
  - Gustav Rose, German mineralogist and university teacher (d. 1873)
  - William Wheelwright, American businessman (d. 1873)
- March 20
  - Anna Bondra, Austrian soprano (d. 1836)
  - Thomas Crimble, English cricketer (d. 1873)
  - Sophia Fowler Gallaudet, deaf educator and wife of Thomas Hopkins Gallaudet (d. 1877)
  - James De La Montanya, American politician (d. 1849)
- March 21 – Chester P. Butler, American politician (d. 1850)
- March 22
  - Richard McDonald Caunter, British soldier and Church of England clergyman (d. 1879)
  - Joachim Otto Voigt, German-Danish botanist and surgeon (d. 1843)
- March 23 – Christiane Bøcher, Norwegian actress (d. 1874)
- March 24
  - Epaphroditus Ransom, American politician (d. 1859)
  - Richard F. Simpson, American politician (d. 1882)
- March 25
  - Corvo Attano, fictional character, Royal Protector, assassin (d. unknown)
  - Christoph Gudermann, German mathematician (d. 1852)
- March 26 – Robert Handyside, Lord Handyside, Scottish lawyer, judge, Solicitor General for Scotland (d. 1858)
- March 27
  - Charles Joseph, comte Bresson, French diplomat (d. 1847)
  - Juana María de los Dolores de León Smith, Spanish noble (d. 1872)
- March 28
  - Joseph Franz, Prince of Dietrichstein, German prince (d. 1858)
  - John Townshend, 4th Marquess Townshend, British Royal Navy admiral (d. 1863)
- March 29
  - Jane Spencer-Churchill, Duchess of Marlborough, 1st wife of George Spencer, 6th Duke (d. 1897)
  - Isaac J. Ullman, American politician (d. 1866)
- March 30
  - Luise Hensel, German writer (d. 1876)
  - Torsten Rudenschöld, Swedish educator and social reformer (d. 1859)
- March 31
  - Charles Anthony, legislative leader and politician in Ohio (d. 1862)
  - Ernesto Capocci, Italian mathematician, astronomer and politician (d. 1864)
  - Lewis Cary, American silversmith (d. 1834)
  - François-Romain Lhérisson, Haitian poet and educator (d. 1859)
  - Carl Gottlieb Peschel, German painter (d. 1879)
  - Jakub Tatarkiewicz, Polish sculptor (d. 1854)
  - John Westenra, politician (d. 1874)

=== April ===
- April 1
  - Jean-Baptiste Glaire, French academic (d. 1879)
  - George Gilliam Steele, American architect (d. 1855)
- April 2
  - John Green Chambers, American physician, pharmacist, politician (d. 1884)
  - August Heinrich Hoffmann von Fallersleben, German scholar and poet (d. 1874)
  - Alexander De Witt, American politician (d. 1879)
- April 3
  - John Banim, Irish writer (d. 1842)
  - Louis Lacoste, Canadian politician (d. 1878)
  - Charles Wilkes, US naval officer and explorer (d. 1877)
- April 4 – Charles Symmes, Canadian politician (d. 1868)
- April 5
  - Jonas Chickering, US piano manufacturer (d. 1853)
  - Marie Amélie Cogniet, French painter (d. 1869)
  - Jean-Jacques-Joseph Leroy d'Etiolles, French surgeon (d. 1860)
  - John Harfield Tredgold, British pharmacist (d. 1842)
  - Louis-Désiré Véron, French politician and opera director (d. 1867)
- April 6
  - James Beckwourth, American mountain man (d. 1866)
  - Jonas Wallström, Swedish decorative painter (d. 1862)
- April 7 – Félix Chadenet, French politician (d. 1874)
- April 8
  - Joel Hayden, American lieutenant governor of Massachusetts (d. 1873)
  - Levin M. Powell, American military officer (d. 1885)
  - Ramón de la Sagra, Spanish economist, sociologist, botanist, political writer (d. 1871)
  - Dionysios Solomos, Greek poet (d. 1857)
- April 9
  - Arphaxed Loomis, American politician (d. 1885)
  - Frederik Thorkildsen Wexschall, Classical violinist (d. 1845)
- April 10
  - Walter Frederick Campbell, British politician (d. 1855)
  - William Greenwood, cricketer (d. 1872)
  - Amasa Sprague, American businessman and politician (d. 1843)
  - John Lewis Wolfe, architect (d. 1881)
- April 11
  - Pierce Mason Butler, American politician (d. 1846)
  - Joseph N. Chambers, American politician and Army officer (d. 1874)
  - Macedonio Melloni, English army officer and politician (d. 1847)
  - Alfred V. du Pont, American chemist and industrialist (d. 1856)
- April 12
  - Elijah Fordham, American missionary (d. 1879)
  - Ambrogio Frangiolli, Italian painter (d. 1870)
  - Caleb S. Layton, American politician (d. 1882)
  - Baron du Potet, French writer (d. 1881)
- April 13 – Cornelius Gilliam, American politician (d. 1848)
- April 14
  - William Clark Jr., American politician (d. 1871)
  - Frederick Spencer, 4th Earl Spencer, British Royal Navy admiral (d. 1857)
- April 15 – Jacques Bernard Hombron, French naval surgeon and naturalist (d. 1852)
- April 16
  - Fanny Gulick, American missionary (d. 1883)
  - Oswald Houston, American pioneer (d. 1861)
  - Georg Klindworth, Diplomat and intelligence agent (d. 1882)
- April 17
  - Étienne Bobillier, French mathematician (d. 1840)
  - Harriet Byron McAllister, American philanthropist (d. 1888)
- April 18 – Antonio Rolla, Italian musician (d. 1837)
- April 19
  - Darius Clark, musician (d. 1871)
  - Franz Joseph Glæser, Czech conductor and composer (d. 1861)
  - Heinrich Maria von Hess, German painter (d. 1863)
  - Andrea Maffei, Italian poet, translator and librettist (d. 1885)
- April 20
  - Frederick Crowder, English cricketer (d. 1894)
  - Dermide Leclerc, French nobility (d. 1804)
  - William Edmond Logan, British-Canadian geologist (d. 1875)
  - Chauncy Hare Townshend, English poet (d. 1868)
- April 22
  - Date Nariyoshi, Daimyo (d. 1828)
  - Adolf von Rauch, German paper manufacturer (d. 1882)
- April 23
  - Édouard Alletz, French diplomat (d. 1850)
  - Richard M. Blatchford, banking and trust lawyer, politician (d. 1875)
- April 24
  - Paul Duport, French playwright (d. 1866)
  - William Edward Petty Hartnell, California pioneer (d. 1854)
- April 26
  - Charles-François Baillargeon, Catholic archbishop (d. 1870)
  - Eugène Delacroix, French painter (d. 1863)
- April 27
  - Claire Clairmont, British writer, mother of Lord Byron's daughter (d. 1879)
  - Peder Christian Holst, Norwegian politician (d. 1873)
  - Pieter Barbiers IV, Dutch painter (d. 1848)
  - Lars Bastian Ridder Stabell, Norwegian politician (d. 1860)
  - François Thomas Tréhouart, French admiral (d. 1873)
- April 28
  - Duncan Forbes, Scottish linguist (d. 1868)
  - William Russell, educator and elocutionist (d. 1873)
- April 29 – Carlo Yvon, Italian oboist and composer (d. 1854)
- April 30
  - Albert, Prince of Schwarzburg-Rudolstadt (d. 1869)
  - Charles-Auguste van den Berghe, painter from France (d. 1853)

=== May ===
- May 1
  - Edward Joshua Cooper, Landowner, politician and astronomer (d. 1863)
  - William Ewart, British politician 1798–1869 (d. 1869)
  - Prince Clemens of Saxony, prince of Saxony (d. 1822)
  - Henri de Tully, French playwright, writer and librettist (d. 1846)
- May 2
  - William Mercer Green, American bishop, first Bishop of Mississippi (d. 1887)
  - Atanasio de Urioste, Bolivian merchant and magnate (d. 1864)
  - Claude Verpilleux, French engineer (d. 1875)
- May 3
  - Thomas Dickens Arnold, American politician (d. 1870)
  - Célestin Guynemer de la Hailandière, French-born bishop in the US (d. 1882)
  - Frederik van Rappard, Dutch politician (d. 1862)
  - Rufus P. Spalding, American politician (d. 1886)
- May 4 – Charles Kanaʻina, Hawaiian noble, father of King Lunalilo (d. 1877)
- May 5 – Jonathan Edwards Ryland, British writer (d. 1866)
- May 6
  - Louis La Caze, French physician and art collector (d. 1869)
  - Adolphus Goldsmith, Australian politician (d. 1876)
  - Eyre Massey, 3rd Baron Clarina, Anglo-Irish peer (d. 1872)
  - Joseph Welland, architect (d. 1860)
  - Aleksander Zawadzki, naturalist (d. 1868)
- May 7 – Emil Wilhelm Krummacher, German clergyman (d. 1886)
- May 8
  - Sir William Hanham, 8th Baronet, British Royal Navy officer (d. 1877)
  - Joanna Belfrage Picken, Scottish poet and teacher (d. 1859)
- May 10
  - Patrick Gaines Goode, American politician (d. 1862)
  - Christodoulos Hatzipetros, Greek military leader (d. 1869)
  - John Forbes Royle, British botanist (d. 1858)
  - Asher Tyler, American politician (d. 1875)
- May 11 – Trinidad Guevara, Uruguayan actor (d. 1873)
- May 12
  - John Kearsley Mitchell, American writer and physician (d. 1858)
  - Alphonse Périn, French painter (d. 1874)
- May 13
  - John Broadwood, English folk song collector (d. 1864)
  - John Payne Elwes, British politician (d. 1849)
- May 14 – Julius Christopher Hammer, Norwegian politician (d. 1877)
- May 15
  - Delino Dexter Calvin, Canadian politician (d. 1884)
  - Ivan Pushchin, Russian writer and judge (d. 1859)
- May 16 – Ellis Lewis, American judge (d. 1871)
- May 17 – George Don, Scottish botanist (d. 1856)
- May 18
  - Ethan A. Hitchcock, Union Army general (d. 1870)
  - James Lowe, English inventor of a screw propeller (d. 1866)
  - Firmin Marbeau, French philanthropist (d. 1875)
  - Anthelme Trimolet, French painter (d. 1866)
- May 19 – Dudley Ryder, 2nd Earl of Harrowby, British politician (d. 1882)
- May 20
  - Jean-Baptiste Chollet, French singer (d. 1892)
  - Theodor Amadeus Müller, German musician (d. 1846)
- May 21
  - Prosper Barbot, French painter (d. 1878)
  - Francis D'Arcy-Osborne, 7th Duke of Leeds, British politician (d. 1859)
  - Moses H. Kirby, American politician in Ohio (d. 1889)
  - Rufus Parks, American politician (d. 1878)
- May 22
  - Thomas Crook, American politician (d. 1879)
  - Alexander McDonnell, Irish chess master (d. 1835)
- May 24 – Walker King, priest (d. 1859)
- May 25 – Antoine-Olivier Berthelet, businessman, philanthropist, politician in Lower Canada (d. 1872)
- May 27
  - Édouard Monnais, French journalist, theater director, playwright, librettist (d. 1868)
  - John Walbanke-Childers, politician (d. 1886)
- May 28
  - Roland Bauchery, French playwright and chansonnier (d. 1863)
  - John Campbell, Scottish advocate and politician (d. 1830)
  - Josef Dessauer, Czech composer (d. 1876)
  - Edward Hughes Ball Hughes, English dandy (d. 1863)
  - Alexander Workman, Canadian politician (d. 1891)
- May 29
  - Walter Forbes, 18th Lord Forbes, British noble (d. 1868)
  - Edward Nevil Macready, British Army officer (d. 1848)
- May 31 – Robert Nugent Dunbar, British poet (d. 1866)

=== June ===
- June 1 – John Hollins, British artist (d. 1855)
- June 2
  - William Branwhite Clarke, British geologist, clergyman (d. 1878)
  - Nakayama Miki, founder of Tenrikyo (d. 1887)
  - Heinrich Gustav Mühlenbeck, Alsatian bryologist (d. 1845)
- June 3 – William Soden Hastings, American politician (d. 1842)
- June 4
  - Filippo Bigioli, Italian painter (d. 1878)
  - William Henry Chase, Florida militia colonel (d. 1870)
  - Alexander Gorchakov, Russian diplomat, minister, chancellor (d. 1883)
  - Niels Laurits Høyen, Danish art historian and critic (d. 1870)
- June 5 – Alexei Lvov, Russian composer (d. 1870)
- June 6 – James White McClung, American lawyer and politician (d. 1848)
- June 7
  - Barnabas Kelet Henagan, Governor of South Carolina (d. 1855)
  - John D. McCarty, Episcopal Missionary Priest (d. 1881)
- June 8
  - Johann Friedrich Riedel, German missionary (d. 1860)
- June 9
  - Eber D. Howe, American newspaper founder (d. 1884)
  - Adrien Recurt, French politician (d. 1872)
  - Eugène Joseph Verboeckhoven, Belgian romantic painter (d. 1881)
- June 10
  - Francis L. Hawks, American politician (d. 1866)
  - Frederick Richard Lee, British artist (d. 1879)
- June 12
  - William Abbot, English actor (d. 1843)
  - Samuel Cooper, Adjutant and Inspector General of the armies of the Confederate States (d. 1876)
- June 13
  - Johann Christian Felix Baehr, German classical philologist and librarian (d. 1872)
  - John Edgar, Irish activist (d. 1866)
  - David Hodgson, English painter (d. 1864)
- June 14 – František Palacký, Czech philosopher, historian, publicist and writer (d. 1876)
- June 16
  - Nabeshima Naotomo, daimyo (d. 1864)
  - Johan Henrik Thomander, Swedish translator, priest and theologian (d. 1865)
- June 18
  - McDonald Clarke, American writer (d. 1842)
  - Mary Martha Pearson, English portrait painter (d. 1871)
- June 19
  - Jan Valerián Jirsík, Czech member of Czech council (d. 1883)
  - Aimé Paris, French music educator, inventor of writing system (d. 1866)
  - Ammi B. Young, American architect (d. 1874)
- June 20
  - John Griesbach, English musician and composer (d. 1875)
  - Daniel McCook, Union Army officer (d. 1863)
- June 21
  - Walter Hilliard Bidwell, American Congregationalist minister, magazine editor (d. 1881)
  - Eduard Daniel Leopold van Ingen, Dutch colonial administrator on the Gold Coast (d. 1833)
  - Anthony Raymond, American architect (d. 1879)
- June 22 – Ditlev Blunck, Danish artist (d. 1853)
- June 23 – Thomas Church, colonial Administrator (d. 1860)
- June 24
  - Harriet Bradford Tiffany Stewart, missionary, writer (d. 1830)
  - Edward Turner, British chemist (d. 1837)
- June 25
  - Alexander Baxter, barrister (d. 1836)
  - Sophia Dallas, wife of US vice president George Mifflin Dallas (d. 1869)
- June 26
  - Wolfgang Menzel, German poet (d. 1873)
  - Josiah Warren, American social reformer, philosopher, inventor, musician, author (d. 1874)
- June 29
  - Willibald Alexis, German historical novelist (d. 1871)
  - Giacomo Leopardi, Italian poet, philosopher and writer (d. 1837)
- June 30
  - Alexander Dyce, Scottish literary editor and historian (d. 1869)
  - Ernst March, German manufacturer (d. 1847)

=== July ===
- July 1
  - Daniel Avery, American Mormon leader (d. 1851)
  - Shah Fazle Rasool Badayuni, former Grand Mufti of India (d. 1872)
  - Edward Curr, English-born pastoralist and politician in Australia (d. 1850)
  - Thomas Nicoll, British cricketer (d. 1883)
- July 2
  - Angelina Eberly, Texan hero (d. 1860)
  - John Forman, Canadian politician (d. 1832)
  - Frederick Polhill, politician (d. 1848)
- July 4 – Ely Moore, American congressman for New York (d. 1860)
- July 5
  - John G. Chapman, American politician (d. 1856)
  - John Gardiner, Australian settler (d. 1878)
  - Hannah Mary Rathbone, novelist and poet (d. 1878)
  - Alphonse Salin, French playwright (d. 1878)
- July 6 – Joseph Bowles, British cricketer (d. 1879)
- July 7
  - John Southerden Burn, English solicitor and antiquary (d. 1870)
  - Robert Gilfillan, British poet and songwriter (d. 1850)
- July 8
  - Abner M. Bradbury, American politician (d. 1885)
  - William Brodrick, 7th Viscount Midleton, Irish Visount (d. 1870)
  - Henry Dundas Campbell, British Governor of Sierra Leone (d. 1872)
  - Ralph Ingersoll Lockwood, American novelist (d. 1858)
  - Thomas Burr Osborne, American politician (d. 1869)
  - Carl Heinrich "Schultzenstein" Schultz, German botanist (d. 1871)
- July 9
  - John Bancker Aycrigg, Member of the US House of Representatives (d. 1856)
  - Gustav Adolf Michaelis, German obstetrician (d. 1848)
- July 10
  - Rudolph Friedrich Hohenacker, Swiss-German missionary, botanist (d. 1874)
  - John Jones, Ojibwa priest (d. 1847)
  - Henry G. Lamar, American politician (d. 1861)
  - X. B. Saintine, French dramatist and novelist (d. 1865)
- July 11 – Paolo Savi, Italian geologist and ornithologist (d. 1871)
- July 12
  - Cyrus Bryant, American educator (d. 1865)
  - William L. Sharkey, American politician (d. 1873)
- July 13
  - Warder Cresson, American diplomat (d. 1860)
  - Alexandra Feodorovna, wife of Nicholas I of Russia (d. 1860)
- July 14
  - Alessandro Antonelli, Italian architect (d. 1888)
  - François Mêlier, academic, member of the Accademia delle Scienze di Torino (d. 1866)
- July 15
  - Alexander Gorchakov, Russian politician (d. 1883)
  - James Kennedy, British politician, barrister, judge, writer (d. 1859)
  - Thomas Stinson, Canadian businessman (d. 1864)
- July 16
  - Georges Oberhaeuser, German physicist (d. 1868)
  - Eduard Friedrich Poeppig, German naturalist (d. 1868)
  - Abbondio Sangiorgio, Italian sculptor (d. 1879)
- July 17 – Aslak Reiersson Midhassel, Norwegian politician (d. 1882)
- July 19
  - Guillaume Louis DeBuys, American politician (d. 1856)
  - Christian August II, Duke of Schleswig-Holstein-Sonderburg-Augustenburg (d. 1869)
  - René de Thorigny, French lawyer and politician (d. 1869)
- July 20 – Andrew Cowie, Canadian politician (d. 1890)
- July 21 – William Wilberforce, English politician (d. 1879)
- July 22
  - Côme-Séraphin Cherrier, Canadian politician (d. 1885)
  - Josef Anton Henne, Swiss historian (d. 1870)
  - Léon Rousseau, Canadian politician (d. 1869)
  - Gabriele Smargiassi, Italian painter (d. 1882)
- July 23
  - James Hyslop, Scottish poet (d. 1827)
  - Jane Herbert Wilkinson Long, "Mother of Texas" (d. 1880)
- July 24
  - Antonio Bresciani, Italian writer (d. 1862)
  - John Adams Dix, Union Army General (d. 1879)
  - James Gallier, Irish-American architect (d. 1866)
  - Mark Napier, Scottish lawyer, biographer and historical author (d. 1879)
- July 25 – Albert Knapp, German poet (d. 1864)
- July 26
  - John Campbell-Wyndham, politician (d. 1869)
  - George W. Lay, American politician (d. 1860)
- July 28
  - William Hope-Johnstone, British Royal Navy admiral (d. 1878)
  - Asahel Huntington, American politician (d. 1870)
  - Hezekiah Williams, American politician (d. 1856)
- July 29
  - Carl Blechen, German painter (d. 1840)
  - Thomas Clap Perkins, American lawyer and politician (d. 1870)
- July 30 – Thomas Chilton, American politician (d. 1854)

=== August ===
- August 2
  - Gabrio Casati, Italian politician (d. 1873)
  - Luis Fernández de Córdova, Spanish general and diplomat (d. 1840)
- August 3
  - Wilhelm Ludwig Deichmann, German banker (d. 1876)
  - Prosper Duvergier de Hauranne, French journalist and politician (d. 1881)
  - Llewelyn Lewellin, British priest (d. 1878)
  - Walker Lewis, African American abolitionist, Freemason, Mormon elder (d. 1856)
- August 4
  - John Gregg, Church of Ireland bishop of Cork (d. 1878)
  - Louis Schwabe, manufacturer of silk and artificial silk fabrics in Manchester (d. 1845)
  - Matsudaira Yorihiro, Japanese daimyo, 9th lord of Takamatsu (d. 1842)
- August 5
  - Salvador María del Carril, Argentine politician (d. 1883)
  - Benjamin Thompson, US Representative from Massachusetts (d. 1852)
  - John Wrottesley, 2nd Baron Wrottesley, British astronomer (d. 1867)
- August 6
  - William Alcott, American physician and author (d. 1859)
  - Anton Delvig, Russian journalist and poet (d. 1831)
  - Pavel Nikolaievich Demidov, Russian nobleman (d. 1840)
  - Pierre Letuaire, French painter (d. 1885)
- August 8
  - Nathan Goodell, American mayor (d. 1883)
  - John Johnson Jr., Chancellor of Maryland (d. 1856)
- August 9
  - Louis-Florentin Calmeil, French psychiatrist (d. 1895)
  - Justus Friedrich Kritz, German classical philologist and high school teacher (d. 1869)
- August 10 – George Vivian, English painter and draughtsman (d. 1873)
- August 11
  - John Marshall Clemens, father of Mark Twain (d. 1847)
  - Dominick Daly, Governor of Prince Edward Island & South Australia (d. 1868)
- August 12 – Abraham Rencher, American politician (d. 1883)
- August 15
  - Charles H. Bell, United States admiral (d. 1875)
  - Henry Labouchere, 1st Baron Taunton, English politician (d. 1869)
  - Joaquín María López y López, Spanish politician, writer, journalist (d. 1855)
- August 16
  - Mirabeau B. Lamar, American politician and poet (d. 1859)
  - Alfred Ollivant, British bishop (d. 1882)
- August 17
  - Lydia Neal Dennett, abolitionist and suffragist from Portland (d. 1881)
  - Thomas Hodgkin, British physician, pathologist (d. 1866)
  - Richard Laming, British chemist (d. 1879)
- August 19
  - Charles Beck, German-born American classical scholar (d. 1866)
  - Asa Lansford Foster, Pennsylvanian geologist, merchant, coal mine owner (d. 1868)
  - Bryan Owsley, American politician (d. 1849)
  - James Shipton, British politician, Merchant (d. 1865)
- August 20 – Jacques Leroy de Saint-Arnaud, French general, Marshal of France, Minister of War (d. 1854)
- August 21
  - François-Antoine Bossuet, Belgian artist (d. 1889)
  - Jules Michelet, French historian, popularized the concept of the Renaissance (d. 1874)
- August 22
  - Richard Robert Madden, Irish doctor, writer, abolitionist and historian (d. 1886)
  - John Peel, British priest (d. 1875)
  - Ignatius A. Reynolds, Catholic bishop (d. 1855)
  - William Gottlieb Schauffler, German missionary (d. 1883)
- August 23
  - Antonio Novasconi, Catholic bishop (d. 1867)
  - William Patton, American pastor and abolitionist (d. 1879)
- August 24 – José María Imbert, Dominican politician (d. 1847)
- August 25 – Joseph von Auffenberg, German dramatist (d. 1857)
- August 26 – John McClintock, 1st Baron Rathdonnell, British politician (d. 1879)
- August 27
  - Ernst Heinrich Kneschke, German writer (d. 1869)
  - Charles Clay Trabue, American banker and Whig politician (d. 1851)
- August 28
  - Gershom Jacques Van Brunt, US Naval Officer during the American Civil War (d. 1818)
  - Harro Harring, German-Danish revolutionary and writer (d. 1870)
  - John W. A. Sanford, American politician and farmer (d. 1870)
- August 29
  - Edward Eliot, 3rd Earl of St Germans, British politician and diplomat (d. 1877)
  - Sardar Singh of Udaipur, Maharaja of Udaipur (d. 1842)
- August 30
  - Archduchess Maria Luisa of Austria, Austro-Tuscan nobility (d. 1857)
  - Virginie Déjazet, French actress (d. 1875)
- August 31
  - William C. Crain, American politician (d. 1865)
  - Johann Mannhardt, German clockmaker (d. 1878)
  - Michael Neher, German artist (d. 1876)
  - Georg Friedrich Puchta, German jurist (d. 1846)
  - Peter Grayson Washington, American Assistant Secretary of the Treasury (d. 1872)

=== September ===
- September 1
  - Richard Delafield, Union Army general (d. 1873)
  - Jean-Augustin Franquelin, French painter (d. 1839)
  - John Horatio Lloyd, English barrister and politician (d. 1884)
  - John A. Quitman, American politician (d. 1858)
- September 2
  - Friedrich Wilhelm Heidenreich, German physician (d. 1857)
  - Thomas Holliday Hicks, American politician (d. 1865)
  - James Scott Howard, first postmaster in Toronto (d. 1866)
- September 3
  - Hartman Bache, American engineer (d. 1872)
  - August Kavel, Australian settler (d. 1860)
- September 4
  - Albert Clinton Horton, American politician (d. 1865)
  - Raynold Kaufgetz, Swiss academic (d. 1869)
  - Francis Julius LeMoyne, American physician (d. 1879)
  - Costantino Patrizi Naro, Catholic cardinal (d. 1876)
- September 5
  - Christian Peder Bianco Boeck, Norwegian medical doctor, zoologist, mountain climber (d. 1877)
  - William Thomas Buckland, British auctioneer (d. 1870)
  - Sophie Esterházy, Austrian courtier (d. 1869)
  - Kujō Hisatada, kuge (d. 1871)
- September 6 – Nathalie Elma d'Esménard, French artist and botanical illustrator (d. 1872)
- September 7 – Karl Schnaase, German art historian (d. 1875)
- September 8
  - George Edmondson, British educator (d. 1863)
  - James D. Green, American politician (d. 1882)
  - Perley B. Johnson, American politician (d. 1870)
  - Robert Hall Morrison, American academic (d. 1889)
- September 9
  - Zechariah Buck, British musician (d. 1879)
  - Joseph Anselm Feuerbach, German archaeologist (d. 1851)
  - Samuel Friedrich Hassel, German actor and singer (d. 1876)
  - Cosmo Innes, British academic (d. 1874)
  - John Pennefather, British Army general (d. 1872)
- September 10 – Adam Johan Frederik Poulsen Trampe, Norwegian jurist (d. 1876)
- September 11
  - Paschal Dumais, Canadian politician (d. 1873)
  - Sarah D. Fish, American suffragist, abolitionist (d. 1868)
  - Franz Ernst Neumann, German mineralogist, physicist, mathematician (d. 1895)
- September 12 – Janez Vesel, Slovenian writer and lawyer (d. 1884)
- September 13 – Robert Hodgson, Canadian lawyer, politician, judge (d. 1880)
- September 14
  - Alexandre Barbié du Bocage, French geographer (d. 1834)
  - Charlotte-Adélaïde Dard, French author (d. 1862)
  - Andreas Nicolai Hansen, Danish merchant (d. 1873)
  - Henry Melvill, British Anglican priest (d. 1871)
- September 16
  - William Goode, American politician and lawyer (d. 1859)
  - Robert Schuyler, American railroad magnate (d. 1855)
- September 18
  - Rufus Babcock, American college president (d. 1875)
  - Edvard Bergenheim, Finnish archbishop (d. 1884)
  - Seymour Brunson, American Mormon leader (d. 1840)
- September 19 – Caesar Hawkins, British surgeon (d. 1884)
- September 20
  - Samuel Henry Dickson, American poet, physician, writer, educator (d. 1872)
  - Micajah W. Kirby, American politician (d. 1882)
  - Philipp Schey von Koromla, Austro-Hungarian merchant & philanthropist (d. 1881)
- September 22
  - Antonio Paulino Limpo de Abreu, Viscount of Abaeté, Brazilian politician & judge (d. 1883)
  - Cornelius P. Lott, American Mormon leader (d. 1850)
  - Joseph C. Noyes, American politician (d. 1868)
  - Marshall Pinckney Wilder, American politician (d. 1886)
- September 23
  - John Collicott, Australian settler and auctioneer (d. 1840)
  - Henry Riddell, Scottish poet and songwriter (d. 1870)
- September 24 – Takashima Shūhan, samurai and military engineer (d. 1866)
- September 25
  - Jean-Baptiste Élie de Beaumont, French geologist (d. 1874)
  - Louis Alphonse de Brébisson, French photographer and botanist (d. 1872)
  - Hendrik Scheffer, Dutch painter (d. 1862)
- September 26
  - Tomás Cipriano de Mosquera, Colombian general and political figure (d. 1878)
  - Heinrich Wilhelm von Pabst, German agronomist and secretary (d. 1868)
  - Etelka Szapáry, Hungarian noblewoman (d. 1876)
  - Mira Sharpless Townsend, Quaker activist and reformer (d. 1859)
- September 27
  - William Blades, American politician and preacher (d. 1877)
  - Jonathan Edwards, American lawyer and politician from New York (d. 1875)
- September 28
  - Bonaventura Genelli, German artist (d. 1868)
  - Charles-Philippe Larivière, French painter (d. 1876)
  - Johann Friedrich Laurer, German botanist, anatomist, pharmacologist (d. 1873)
  - Johann Heinrich Schilbach, German painter (d. 1851)
  - James G. Taliaferro, American judge (d. 1876)
- September 29
  - Dwight Baldwin, American Christian missionary on Maui during the Kingdom of Hawaii (d. 1886)
  - Edwyn Burnaby, English landowner (d. 1867)
  - Toma Jederlinić, Croatian prelate, Catholic bishop of Dubrovnik, apostolic administrator of Trebinje-Mrkan (d. 1855)
  - Michele Viale-Prelà, aristocratic Catholic priest from Corsica, France (d. 1860)
  - Charles Henry Warren, American politician (d. 1874)
- September 30 – John Wilkinson, lawyer and Postmaster (d. 1862)

=== October ===
- October 1 – James Wentworth Buller, British politician (d. 1865)
- October 2
  - Michael James Robert Dillon, 12th Earl of Roscommon, Irish Earl (d. 1850)
  - Théodore Guérin, Catholic saint and nun from France (d. 1856)
  - Gazaway Bugg Lamar, steamboat pioneer, banker, Confederate supporter (d. 1874)
  - King Charles Albert of Sardinia, King of Sardinia (d. 1849)
  - James Beaty Sr., Canadian politician (d. 1892)
  - Emmanuel Vincent, English cricketer (d. 1860)
- October 3
  - John Parker, English cleric and architect (d. 1860)
  - Morris Jacob Raphall, British-born American rabbi (d. 1868)
  - Louis Vasquez, Spanish mountain man (d. 1868)
- October 4
  - Lewis Caleb Beck, United States naturalist (d. 1853)
  - Phineas W. Leland, American politician (d. 1870)
  - Ange Paulin Terver, French malacologist (d. 1875)
  - Constantin Wesmael, Belgian entomologist (d. 1872)
- October 5
  - Michael Zittle Jr., novelist (d. 1877)
  - Joseph Power, librarian of the University of Cambridge (d. 1868)
- October 6
  - Robert Baird, American clergyman and writer (d. 1863)
  - Charles B. Penrose, American politician (d. 1857)
- October 7
  - William Robertson, Australian pastoralist (d. 1874)
  - Jean-Baptiste Vuillaume, French luthier (d. 1875)
- October 8
  - John Byington, American Seventh-day Adventist minister (d. 1887)
  - Philarète Chasles, French critic and man of letters (d. 1873)
  - Hans Holmboe, Norwegian educator and politician (d. 1868)
  - Felix Neff, Swiss minister (d. 1829)
- October 9
  - Samuel Dana Bell, American judge (d. 1868)
  - Isaac Ferris, American University president (d. 1873)
  - William Thorold, British businessman (d. 1878)
- October 10 – Bateman Paul, Church of England clergyman and writer (d. 1877)
- October 11
  - Ida Arenhold, German social reformer (d. 1863)
  - John Duncan Bligh, British diplomat (d. 1872)
  - Samuel Gardner Drake, United States historian and antiquarian (d. 1875)
  - Bache McEvers, American commission merchant, shipper and insurer (d. 1851)
  - Thomas Overskou, Theatre historian, playwright, actor (d. 1873)
  - Ole Ingebrigtsen Soelberg, Norwegian politician (d. 1874)
- October 12
  - Pedro I of Brazil, Emperor of Brazil, and King of Portugal (d. 1834)
  - Jesse Olney, American geographer (d. 1872)
- October 13
  - Herman Wilhelm Bissen, Danish sculptor (d. 1868)
  - Jean Henri De Coene, Belgian painter (d. 1866)
  - Solomon Quetsch, Austrian rabbi (d. 1856)
  - Robert Crichton Wyllie, Scottish-born Hawaiian politician (d. 1865)
- October 14
  - Jean-Charles-Alphonse Avinain, French serial killer (d. 1867)
  - Łukasz Baraniecki, Catholic archbishop of Lviv (d. 1858)
  - Mayhew Beckwith, Canadian politician (d. 1871)
  - Sir Charles Maclean, 9th Baronet, 25th Chief of Clan Maclean (d. 1883)
- October 15 – Patrick Raymond Griffith, Irish Dominican priest (d. 1862)
- October 16
  - Martiniano Chilavert, Argentine military officer (d. 1852)
  - John Carnac Morris, British lexicographer (d. 1858)
- October 17 – Peter Harvey, biographer (d. 1877)
- October 18 – Karl Ludwig von Bruck, Austrian politician (d. 1860)
- October 19
  - George Coles, English cricketer (d. 1865)
  - Charles A. Ingersoll, United States federal judge (d. 1860)
  - Robert Pollok, Scottish poet (d. 1827)
- October 20 – William A. Moseley, American politician (d. 1873)
- October 21
  - Karl Heinrich Baumgärtner, German physician (d. 1886)
  - Massimo d'Azeglio, Italian statesman, novelist and painter (d. 1866)
- October 22
  - Lovisa Charlotta Borgman, Swedish musician (d. 1884)
  - Mariano Eduardo de Rivero y Ustáriz, Peruvian geologist, mineralogist, chemist, archaeologist, politician (d. 1857)
- October 25
  - Henry Nelson Coleridge, British writer (d. 1843)
  - James Everard Home, British Royal Navy officer (d. 1853)
  - Ernst Hermann Joseph Münch, German librarian and historian (d. 1841)
- October 26 – Beda Weber, Austrian writer (d. 1858)
- October 27
  - John Meeson Parsons, British art collector (d. 1870)
  - Gustav Parthey, German classical philologist, art historian (d. 1872)
  - Heinrich Scherk, German mathematician (d. 1885)
- October 28
  - Henri Bertini, French composer (d. 1876)
  - Clément-Charles Sabrevois de Bleury, Canadian politician (d. 1862)
  - Levi Coffin, American educator and abolitionist (d. 1877)
  - Hippolyte François Jaubert, French botanist and politician (d. 1874)
- October 29 – William Lascelles, British politician (d. 1851)
- October 30 – Maurice Schlesinger, German music publisher (d. 1871)
- October 31
  - Antonio Cabral Bejarano, Spanish painter (d. 1861)
  - William Stuart, British politician (d. 1874)

=== November ===
- November 1
  - Henry Dupont, French entomologist, natural history specimen trader (d. 1873)
  - Benjamin Guinness, British politician (d. 1868)
  - James Morris, Canadian politician (d. 1865)
  - Armand Joseph Overnay, French playwright (d. 1853)
- November 2 – Jules Coignet, French painter (d. 1860)
- November 3
  - James M. Mason, American politician (d. 1871)
  - Henry Wilder, English cricketer (d. 1836)
- November 4
  - Buenaventura Carlos Aribau, Spanish writer, politician, economist (d. 1862)
  - John Heritage Bryan, American politician (d. 1870)
  - John Dilloway, English cricketer (d. 1869)
  - Karl Kreil, Austrian meteorologist and astronomer (d. 1862)
  - John Laporte, American politician (d. 1862)
  - Henriette Méric-Lalande, singer (d. 1867)
- November 5
  - William Gamble, English cricketer (d. 1855)
  - Charles Gibbs, American pirate (d. 1831)
  - Pascoe St Leger Grenfell, British copper smelter (d. 1879)
  - Marie-Caroline of Bourbon-Two Sicilies, Duchess of Berry, Italian princess (d. 1870)
- November 6
  - Iulian Liublinskii, Slav nationalist and Decembrist (d. 1873)
  - George Agnew Reay, British organist (d. 1879)
- November 7
  - Silas H. Stringham, American Navy admiral (d. 1876)
  - Lord John Thynne, English aristocrat, Deputy Dean of Westminster (d. 1881)
- November 8
  - John Janney, American politician (d. 1872)
  - Samuel Morgan, American businessman (d. 1880)
- November 9
  - Arthur Hill-Trevor, 3rd Viscount Dungannon, English Conservative Party politician (d. 1862)
  - William Russell, British Whig politician (d. 1850)
- November 10
  - Charles Philip Brown, British official of the East India Company (d. 1884)
  - Eliza, Lady Darling, wife of Major-General Ralph Darling and artist (d. 1868)
- November 11
  - Ivane Andronikashvili, Georgian noble, general in the Imperial Russian service (d. 1868)
  - Edward Cross, American politician (d. 1887)
  - John Amory Lowell, American businessman & anthropologist (d. 1881)
  - Montagu Stopford, British Royal Navy admiral (d. 1864)
- November 13 – Anne Nasmyth, Scottish artist (d. 1874)
- November 14
  - Alexandre Louis Lefèbvre de Cérisy, French entomologist (d. 1867)
  - Peder Carl Lasson, Norwegian politician (d. 1873)
- November 15
  - Thomas Barker, English county cricketer (d. 1877)
  - Rice Richard Clayton, politician (d. 1879)
  - Abel Hugo, Writer (one of Victor Hugo's brothers) (d. 1855)
  - William Mattice, Canadian politician (d. 1881)
  - Gabriel Monsen, Norwegian politician (d. 1882)
- November 16
  - Jacques Antoine Bonebakker, Dutch jeweller, goldsmith, silversmith (d. 1868)
  - Joseph Chinn, American politician (d. 1840)
  - Marie-Joseph Farcot, French engineer (d. 1875)
  - Therese Grob, Austrian singer (d. 1875)
  - Persifor Frazer Smith, American politician (d. 1858)
- November 18 – Eugène Renduel, French publisher (d. 1874)
- November 19 – José María Alviso, American mayor (d. 1853)
- November 20 – Johann Georg August Wirth, German journalist and author (d. 1848)
- November 21
  - Jérôme-Adolphe Blanqui, French economist (d. 1854)
  - Léon Lacabane, French historian, librarian, palaeographer (d. 1884)
  - Ferdinand Langlé, French playwright (d. 1867)
  - John Clements Wickham, Explorer of Australia (d. 1864)
- November 22 – Angeliki Palli, Italian poet, translator, editor (d. 1875)
- November 23
  - Hannah Simpson Grant, mother of Ulysses S. Grant (d. 1883)
  - Klementyna Hoffmanowa, Polish writer, translator, editor, writer for children (d. 1845)
  - Franz Horny, German painter (d. 1824)
  - Alonzo Morphy, American judge (d. 1856)
  - Francis Ruddle, British carpenter (d. 1882)
- November 26
  - Count Ludwig Joseph von Boos-Waldeck, German nobleman, promoted emigration to Texas (d. 1880)
  - John Strong Sr., American politician (d. 1881)
- November 27
  - Étienne-Ossian Henry, French chemist (d. 1873)
  - Andries Pretorius, South African politician (d. 1853)
  - Friedrich Ludwig von Rönne, German diplomat (d. 1865)
  - Menucha Rochel Slonim, matriarch of the Hebron community (d. 1888)
  - Rafael Tegeo, Spanish painter (d. 1856)
- November 28 – Cora Millet-Robinet, French writer (d. 1890)
- November 29
  - Alexander Brullov, Russian artist (d. 1877)
  - Hamilton Rowan Gamble, American jurist and politician (d. 1864)
- November 30 – Friedrich Heinrich Ranke, German theologian (d. 1876)

=== December ===
- December 1
  - Albert Barnes, American theologian (d. 1870)
  - Frederic Carpenter Skey, English surgeon (d. 1872)
- December 2
  - Asa Child, American attorney (d. 1858)
  - António Luís de Seabra, 1st Viscount of Seabra, Portuguese judge, lawyer and politician (d. 1895)
- December 3
  - David L. Beatty, American politician (d. 1881)
  - Philippe-Frédéric Blandin, French surgeon (d. 1849)
  - William Henry Cogswell, American politician (d. 1876)
  - Gilbert Knapp, American politician (d. 1887)
  - Alfred Iverson Sr., American politician (d. 1873)
- December 4
  - Félix-Sébastien Feuillet de Conches, art collector (d. 1887)
  - Jules Armand Dufaure, thrice prime minister of France (d. 1881)
  - William Evans, English watercolor painter (d. 1877)
- December 5
  - Alexandre-Marie Colin, French painter (d. 1875)
  - Ferdinand Pettrich, German sculptor (d. 1872)
- December 6
  - James Hosken, English naval officer and mariner (d. 1885)
  - Niccolò Matas, Italian architect (d. 1872)
- December 8
  - Antoine Laurent Dantan, French sculptor (d. 1878)
  - Joseph Romain-Desfossés, French admiral (d. 1864)
  - Thomas T. Whittlesey, American politician (d. 1868)
- December 9
  - Friedrich Gottlieb Bartling, German botanist (d. 1875)
  - James Sevier Conway, 1st governor of Arkansas (d. 1855)
  - John Walsh, 1st Baron Ormathwaite, British politician (d. 1881)
- December 10
  - Andrew Buchanan, Scottish surgeon and professor of physiology (d. 1882)
  - George Fletcher Moore, politician, public servant, diarist (d. 1886)
- December 11
  - Thomas Aspinwall Davis, American mayor and silversmith (d. 1845)
  - Maria Hartmann, German-born Moravian missionary (d. 1853)
  - John S.C. Knowlton, American politician (d. 1871)
- December 12
  - Daniel S. Bacon, American politician and judge (d. 1866)
  - Friedrich August Grotefend, German classical philologist (d. 1836)
- December 13
  - Edward Thomas Bainbridge, United Kingdom Member of Parliament (d. 1872)
  - Otto Philipp Braun, Bolivian military leader (d. 1869)
  - James Henry, Irish poet (d. 1876)
  - Shadrack F. Slatter, American slave trader and capitalist (d. 1861)
  - Joseph R. Walker, American explorer (d. 1876)
- December 14 – Alexis Bailly, American politician and fur trader (d. 1861)
- December 15 – Edward Burleson, American politician (d. 1851)
- December 16
  - John Berdan, American politician (d. 1841)
  - Chester W. Chapin, American politician, railroad executive (d. 1883)
  - Joachim Pollak, Czech rabbi (d. 1879)
- December 17
  - Charles Broadbridge, English cricketer (d. 1841)
  - Julius Converse, American politician (d. 1885)
  - William Forster, British Army officer (d. 1879)
  - John Pope, United States Navy officer (d. 1876)
- December 18
  - Henry Black, Canadian lawyer, judge and politician (d. 1873)
  - Emil Normann, painter and naval officer (d. 1881)
  - Heinrich Smidt, German writer (d. 1867)
  - Christopher Harris Williams, American politician (d. 1857)
- December 19
  - Lady Mary Fox, noblewoman, British aristocrat and writer (d. 1864)
  - James Seaton Reid, Irish church historian (d. 1851)
- December 20
  - Laurens Perseus Hickok, American philosopher (d. 1888)
  - John Wood, Governor of Illinois (d. 1880)
- December 21 – Paul, French dancer (d. 1871)
- December 22
  - George W. Crawford, American politician (d. 1872)
  - José Antonio Vidaurre, Chilean Army officer (d. 1837)
- December 23
  - Arthur Ingram Aston, English diplomat (d. 1859)
  - James Carter, British engraver (d. 1855)
  - Alpheus Spring Packard Sr., American classical philologist (d. 1884)
- December 24
  - William Clarke, English cricketer (d. 1856)
  - Valerian Engelhardt, Russian lieutenant general (d. 1856)
  - Adam Mickiewicz, Polish writer (d. 1855)
  - John Stockton, American politician (d. 1878)
- December 25
  - Catherine Grace Godwin, Scottish novelist, amateur painter, poet (d. 1845)
  - Richard Green Parker, United States educator, textbook writer (d. 1869)
  - Noel Le Vasseur, Illinois fur trader (d. 1879)
  - Hugh White, American politician (d. 1870)
- December 26
  - Ferdinand Freiherr von Beschwitz, German noble (d. 1874)
  - Amariah Brigham, American psychiatrist (d. 1849)
  - Étienne Chartier, Canadian priest (d. 1853)
  - Joseph Wigram, Bishop of Rochester (d. 1867)
- December 27
  - Alexander Colquhoun-Stirling-Murray-Dunlop, church lawyer & politician (d. 1870)
  - William Wilson Corcoran, American banker (d. 1888)
  - Nikolay Protasov, Russian general (d. 1855)
- December 28
  - Heinrich Philipp August Damerow, German physician and psychiatrist (d. 1866)
  - John Ffolliott, Irish landowner and MP (d. 1868)
  - Thomas Henderson, Scottish lawyer, astronomer & mathematician (d. 1844)
  - John Ward, English painter (d. 1849)
- December 29
  - Algernon Greville, soldier and cricketer (d. 1864)
  - Barzillai Quaife, Australian minister and writer (d. 1873)
  - Nathaniel Treat, politician (d. 1894)
- December 30
  - Charles Clerke, English Anglican priest (d. 1877)
  - Johann Jakob Meyer, Swiss pharmacist (d. 1826)
- December 31 – Friedrich Robert Faehlmann, Estonian writer (d. 1850)
- Date unknown:
  - Mary Faber, West African slave trader and local potentate (d. after 1857)
  - Eduard von Feuchtersleben, Polish-born mining engineer and writer (d. 1857)

== Deaths ==
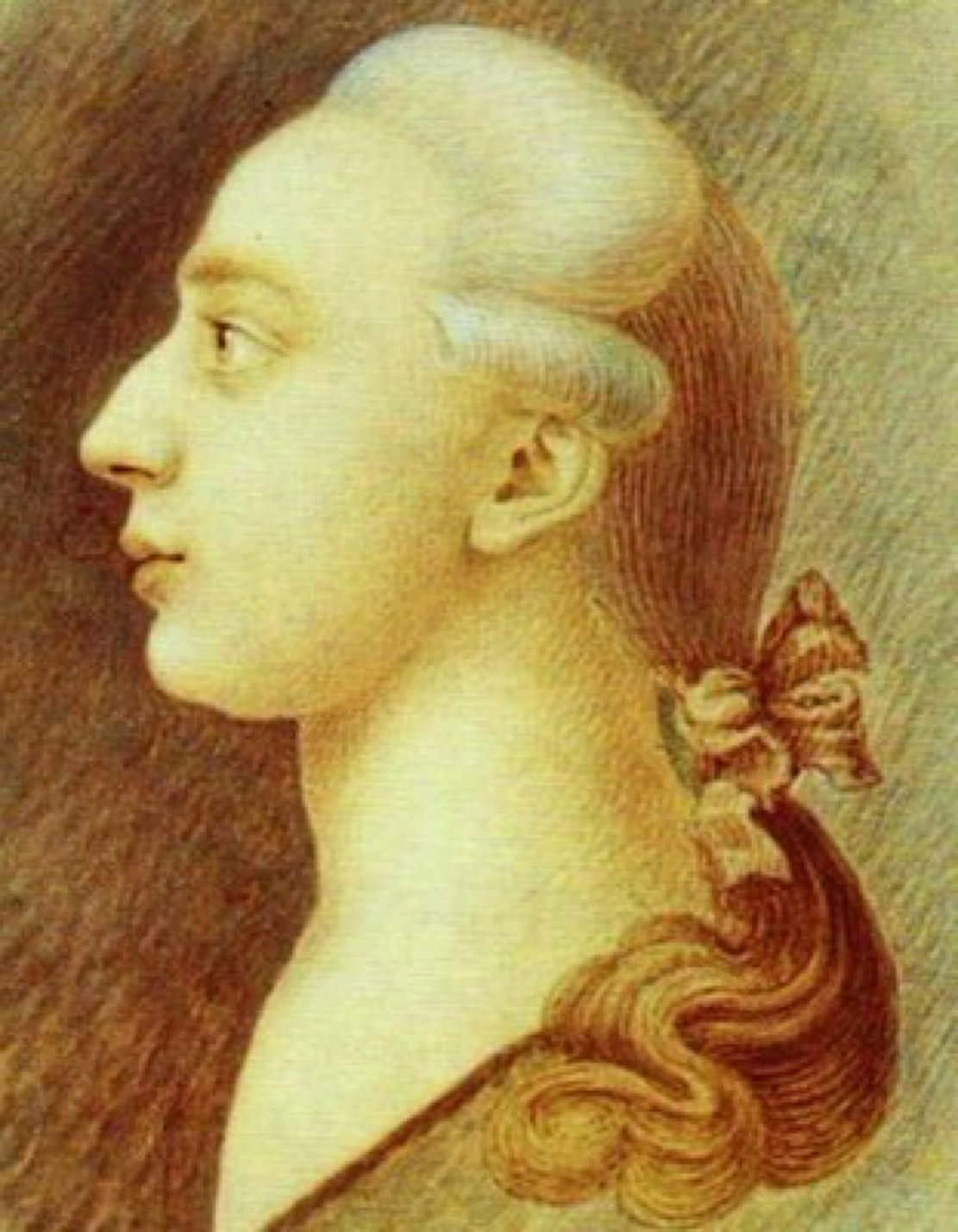
Giacomo Casanova

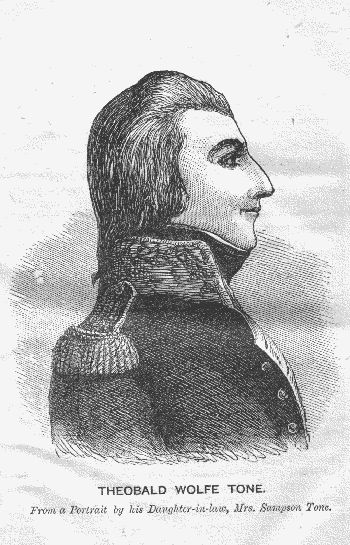
Wolfe Tone

- January 3 – Carlo Aurelio Widmann, Venetian nobleman and admiral (b. 1750)
- January 22 – Lewis Morris, American landowner and developer, signer of the United States Declaration of Independence (b. 1726)
- February 12 – Stanisław August Poniatowski, deposed last King of Poland and Grand Duke of Lithuania (b. 1732)
- February 25 – Louis Jules Mancini Mazarini, French diplomat, writer (b. 1716)
- March 22 – Justin Morgan, American horse breeder and composer (b. 1747)
- March 25 – General Michel Joachim Marie Raymond, French leader of the army of the Nizam of Hyderabad (poisoned) (b. 1755)
- April – Gideon Morris, trans-Appalachian pioneer (b. 1756)
- April 11 – Karl Wilhelm Ramler, German poet (b. 1725)
- April 12 – Madeleine de Puisieux, French writer, active feminist (b. 1720)
- April 14 – Henry Mowat, Scottish-born British Royal Navy officer (b. 1734)
- April 29 – Nikolaus Poda von Neuhaus, German entomologist (b. 1723)
- May 10 – George Vancouver, British Royal Navy officer, explorer (Vancouver, Canada is named after him) (b. 1757)
- May 19 – William Byron, 5th Baron Byron, English dueler (b. 1722)
- June – Betsy Gray, Irish rebel heroine
- June 4 – Giacomo Casanova, Italian adventurer, writer (b. 1725)
- June 21 – John Kelly of Killanne, Irish republican
- June 25 – Thomas Sandby, English cartographer, architect (b. 1721)
- June 29 – Catharina Mulder, Dutch orangist (b. 1723)
- July 17 – Henry Joy McCracken, Irish republican
- July 21 – François Sébastien Charles Joseph de Croix, Count of Clerfayt, Austrian field marshal (b. 1733)
- August 1 – François-Paul Brueys d'Aigalliers, French admiral (killed in battle) (b. 1753)
- August 11 – Joshua Clayton, American politician (b. 1744)
- August 18 – John Lewis Gervais, American revolutionary and politician (b. 1741)
- August 21 – James Wilson, American politician (b. 1742)
- August 24 – Thomas Alcock, English clergyman (b. 1709)
- August 25 – Mikiel'Ang Grima, Maltese surgeon (b. 1731)
- September 21 – George Read, American lawyer, signer of the Declaration of Independence (b. 1733)
- November 5 – John Zephaniah Holwell, British surgeon (b. 1711)
- November 15 – Angelo Maria Amorevoli, Italian operatic tenor (b. 1716)
- November 19 – Wolfe Tone, Irish republican (b. 1737)
- November 21 – Gabriel Lenkiewicz, Belarusian Temporary Vicar General of the Society of Jesus (b. 1722)
- December 4 – Luigi Galvani, Italian physicist (b. 1737)
- December 16 – Thomas Pennant, Welsh naturalist (b. 1726)
