= Kate Maxey =

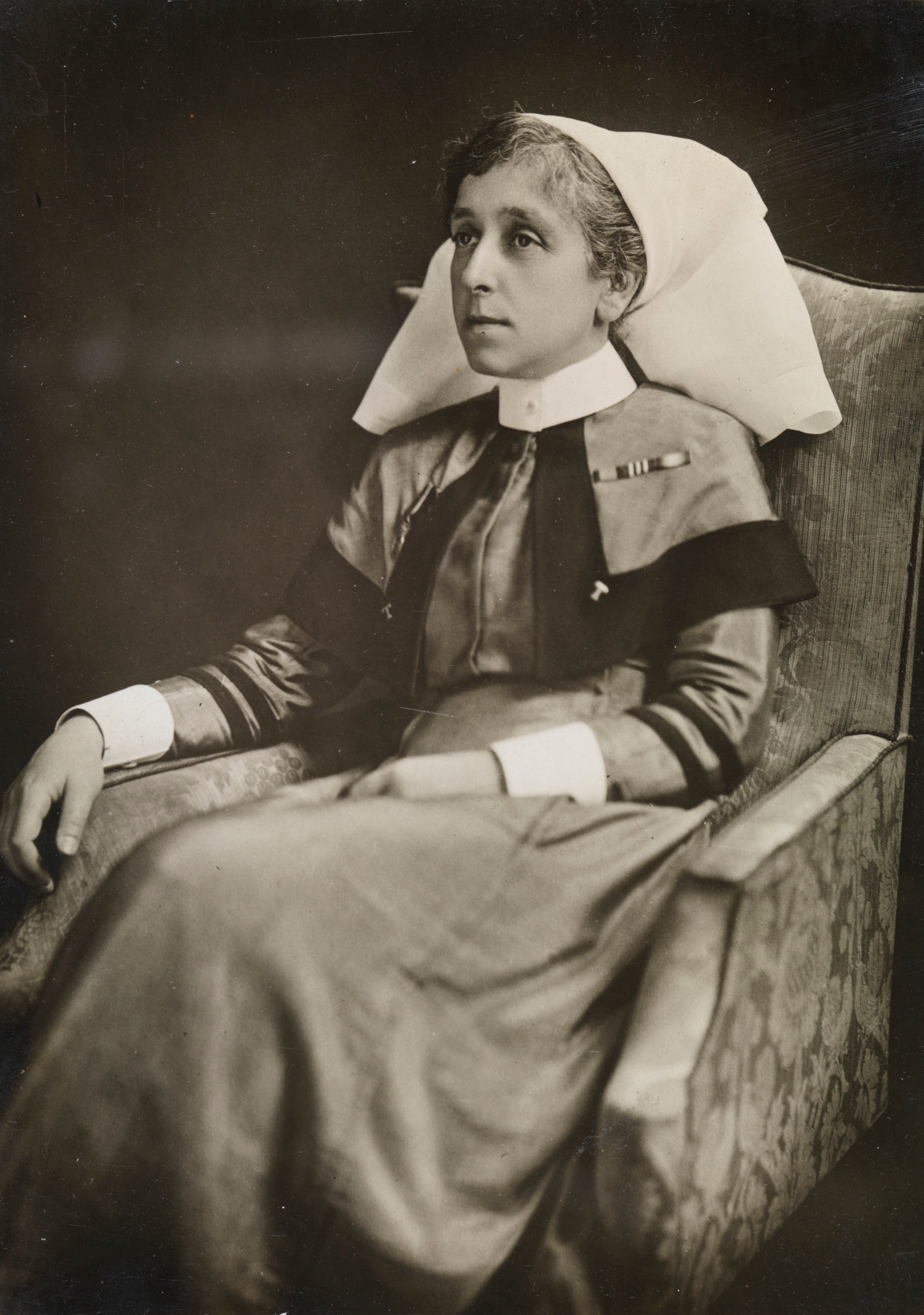
- Maxey c. 1918–1919
- Born: 17 December 1876; Spennymoor, County Durham
- Died: 14 March 1969 (aged 92); Bishop Auckland, County Durham
- Military career
- Allegiance: British
- Branch: Army
- Service years: 1912–1931
- Rank: Sister-in-charge
- Unit: Territorial Force Nursing Service
- Conflicts: Western Front, First World War
- Awards: Florence Nightingale Medal; Royal Red Cross (1st class); Military Medal; Mentioned in dispatches

Kate Maxey (17 December 1876 – 14 March 1969) was a British nurse. Maxey served in France throughout the First World War and was awarded the Royal Red Cross and the Military Medal. Maxey was one of the inaugural recipients of the Florence Nightingale Medal in 1920.

== Early life ==
Maxey was born in Spennymoor, County Durham, on 17 December 1876. She was one of two daughters of Walter Maxey and his second wife Jane (nee Watford). As a teenager, Maxey and her sister Amelia lived in Leeds with an aunt and uncle. Maxey then trained to be a nurse, training at Leeds General Infirmary, qualifying in 1903.

In 1908, the Territorial Force Nursing Service (TFNS) was established. In 1912, Maxey enlisted in the new service and was part of the staff of the Territorial Force 2nd Northern General Hospital based at the City of Leeds Training College, Beckett Park in north-west Leeds.

== Wartime service ==
The First World War began in August 1914; Maxey was called up to duty with the TFNS at the end of September 1914 and in early October 1914, she was posted to 8 General Hospital at Rouen, France. This began an almost continuous period of service on the Western Front until 1918 with only two short periods of leave in the United Kingdom.

Maxey was promoted to Sister in 1916. In January 1917 Maxey was mentioned in dispatches. In September 1917 was posted to 58th Casualty Clearing Station (58th CCS) as Sister-in-Charge. At this time 58th CCS was based at Lillers, Pas-de-Calais.

On 21 March 1918, the German army launched the Spring offensive. As part of this, German aircraft from Bogohl 3 bombed the railway station at Lillers. Maxey and three other nurses from 58th CCS were returning from the hospital to their billets in the town when the bombing began. One bomb hit a train loaded with ammunition standing in the station, which was only a few hundred metres from 58th CCS. The train exploded, causing extensive damage to 58th CCS. One of the other nurses with Maxey, Sister Ellen Andrews, killed and Maxey was serious injured with blast wounds all over and a broken arm. Despite the severity of her wounds, Maxey continued to direct the staff and refused treatment to herself until all other casualties had been attended to. Maxey was initialled treated at 58th CCS but on 24 March, she was evacuated, first to a base hospital and then to the Queen Alexandra Military Hospital in London.

On 2 April 1918, Field Marshal Douglas Haig, the British Commander-in-Chief approved the award of the Military Medal (Note: Although nursing sisters and matrons were afforded the status of officers, they did not hold the King's commission and were attached to the army rather than being part of the army. They were not, therefore, eligible to be awarded decorations such as the Military Cross or the Distinguished Service Order. At first they were not eligible for awards of the Military Medal but King George V amended the Royal Warrant in July 1916 to make women eligible for the Military Medal.) to Maxey and three other nurses from 58th CCS. The notice of the award of the Military medal appeared in the London Gazette on 31 May 1918.

The citation stated:

For gallantry and conspicuous devotion to duty displayed during a recent hostile bombing raid on a Casualty Clearing Station. Although severely wounded herself, she went to the aid of another Sister, who was fatally wounded, and did all she could for her. Later, although suffering severe pain, she showed an example of pluck and endurance which was inspiring to all.

— London Gazette, 31 May 1918

On the same date, Maxey was awarded the Royal Red Cross (1st class). Both awards were presented to Maxey by King George V at an investiture ceremony on 22 June 1918.

Maxey's achievements were recognised by her home town in July 1918 when the Spennymoor Ambulance Brigade and Nursing Division presented her with a set of silver salt pots and spoons.

A medical board assessed Maxey as fit to resume her duties in August 1918. Maxey applied to return to France but the Matron-in-Chief, Sidney Browne, decided that a posting in England was suitable and assigned Maxey to the 2nd Northern General Hospital in Leeds. Maxey remained at the Beckett Park hospital until she was demobilised in June 1919 although she remained an active member of the TFNS and its successor, the Territorial Army Nursing Service, until she reached the mandatory retirement age of 55 in 1931.

== Later life ==
On being demobilised, Maxey started a nursing home in Halifax with friend and fellow nurse Anne Simpson.

In 1920, Maxey was name as one of the inaugural recipients of the International Committee of the Red Cross's Florence Nightingale Medal.

In 1931, Maxey retired and moved to live in London and later the south coast of England. She returned to her roots in her last years and was living with a niece in Bishop Auckland when she died in 1969, aged 92.

== In film ==
Maxey's nursing service during the First World War was incorporated into a 62-minute documentary called Behind the Lines. The film made by Lonely Tower Film and Media for Tudhoe & Spennymoor Local History Society looks at the part played by Spennymoor residents in the medical services during the war

== Sources ==
- Hallett, Christine E. (2017). Nurses of Passchendaele: caring for the wounded of the Ypres campaigns 1914-1918. Barnsley: Pen & Sword History. ISBN 978-1526702883.
- Piggott, Juliet (1975). Queen Alexandra's Royal Army Nursing Corps. London: Cooper. ISBN 978-0850521931.
