= Barrs =

Barrs may refer to:

== People ==
- Alfred George Barrs (c. 1853–1934), physician and professor
- Caroline Barrs (born 1964), cricket player
- Frank Barrs (1871–1963), English cricket player
- Jay Barrs (born 1962), American archer
- Myra Barrs (1939–2023), British educationist and literacy researcher
- Vanessa Barrs, veterinary researcher

== Places ==
- Barrs Court, Bristol, England
- Barrs Mills, Ohio, United States
- Barrs Run (Tenmile Creek tributary)
- Barss Corner, Nova Scotia, Canada
