= Sarah Swift =

English nurse (1854–1937)

Dame Sarah Ann Swift, GBE, RRC (22 November 1854, Kirton Skeldyke, Lincolnshire – 27 June 1937, Marylebone) was an English nurse and founder in 1916 of the College of Nursing Ltd. which became the Royal College of Nursing. The College of Nursing created the first registers of nurses, a blueprint for the introduction of Nurse registration in the United Kingdom.

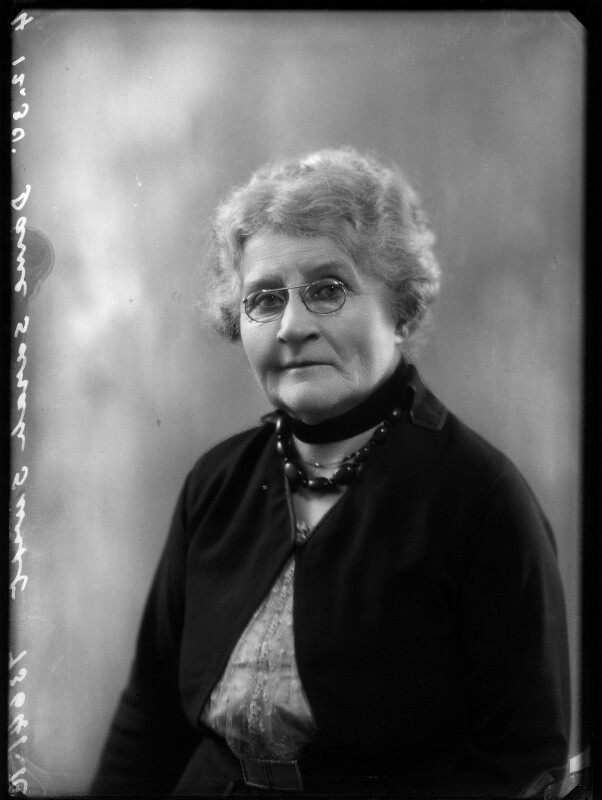
Dame Sarah Ann Swift - Portrait - National Portrait Gallery x150248

== Early life ==
Swift was born on the Blossom Hall Estate at Kirton Skeldyke in Holland, Lincolnshire, the daughter of Robert Swift, a tenant farmer. She undertook training in nursing at the Royal Infirmary, Dundee (1877-1890).

== Nursing career ==
Swift held a number of senior nursing and matron positions in Dundee (Home for the Incurables 1886). City Hospital Liverpool (1887), London Fever Hospital (1888), Seamen's Hospital Constantinople (1890) then Guy's Hospital, London. She was Matron of Guy's Hospital (1901–09), then retired, but at the outbreak of the First World War she was appointed matron-Chief for the British Red Cross Society and the Order of St John of Jerusalem in England.

== Royal College of Nursing ==
With the Hon. Arthur Stanley (MP, Chairman of the Joint War Committee of the British Red Cross in World War One ) Swift founded the College of Nursing Ltd . The other four founding members were Miss Alicia Lloyd-Still (matron of St. Thomas' Hospital, London), Miss Rachael Cox-Davies (matron of the Royal Free Hospital, London), Mr Cooper Perry (Medical superintendent of Guy's Hospital, London) and Mr Comyns Berkely (consultant at the Middlesex Hospital, London ). A letter was sent out to all the training hospitals outlining the idea pointing out that although there was disagreement on issues relating to registration there was a need to coordinated nursing and all trained nurses should unite in one democratic organisation with the power in the hands of the membership.

By 1918 there were 13,000 Members. They elected the first council and set up Centres (later to be called Branches). The College of Nursing Ltd later became the Royal College of Nursing (RCN) modeled on the Royal College of Physicians and surgeons. On 27 March 1916 the College of Nursing was registered as a limited company. Dame Sarah Swift was the first member of the College of Nursing, member of Council 1916-37, President 1925-27, Vice president 1928-9 and Hon.Treasurer 1927-37

The College of Nursing became the Royal College of Nursing in 1947.

== Recognition ==
In 1916 Swift was made Lady of Grace of the Order of St John of Jerusalem.

In 1919 she was made Dame Grand Cross of the Order of the British Empire (GBE) for her services to nursing.

In 1929 she was awarded the Florence Nightingale medal of the International Committee of the Red Cross.

== Legacy ==
A ward at St Thomas Hospital is named after her.

A building at the University of Lincoln bears her name

== Sources ==
- McGann, Susan (1992). Battle of the Nurses: a study of eight women who influenced the development of professional nursing 1880-1930. London: Scutari. ISBN 1-871364-62-0.

Preceded by Sidney Browne	President of the Royal College of Nursing; 1922 - 1925	Succeeded by Annie Warren Gill
