= Euphemia Steele Innes =

Scottish nurse (1874–1955)

Euphemia Steele Innes RRC DN
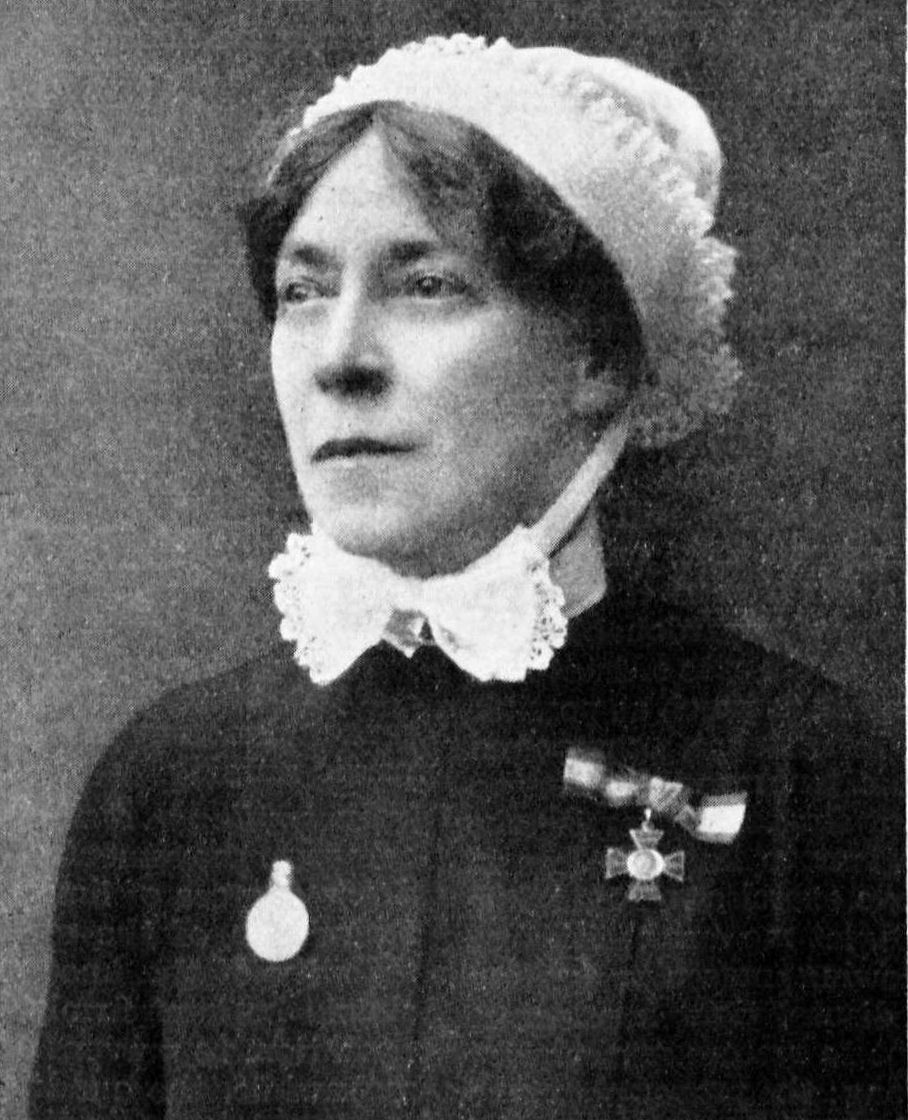
- Euphemia Steele Innes, c. 1916
- Born: 26 February 1874; Panbride, Angus, Scotland
- Died: 9 May 1955 (aged 81); Newington, Edinburgh, Scotland
- Years active: 1897 – c. 1938
- Known for: Founder of Leeds Nurses' League
- Medical career
- Profession: Nurse
- Institutions: Territorial Force Nursing Service; Leeds General Infirmary; 2nd Northern General Hospital; Queen Alexandra's Army Nursing Board
- Awards: Royal Red Cross

Signature
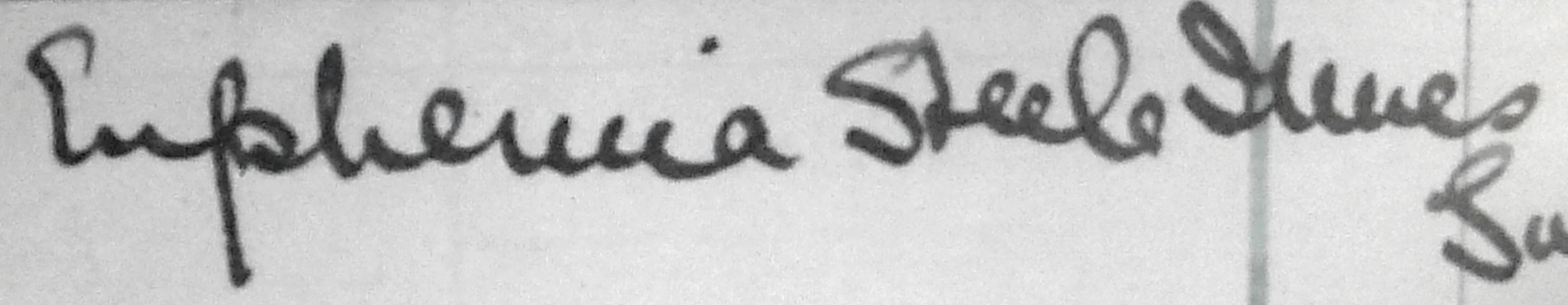

Euphemia Steele Innes RRC DN (26 February 1874 – 9 May 1955) was a Scottish nurse who served for 21 years as matron at Leeds General Infirmary in Leeds, West Riding of Yorkshire, England. She was decorated with the Royal Red Cross 1st class in 1916 for services with the Territorial Force Nursing Service in the First World War.

Innes was the daughter of a Free Church of Scotland minister. She trained at Leeds University, and worked as nursing sister, assistant matron and then matron, mainly in Leeds General Infirmary (LGI). She was already matron at the LGI when she was awarded Leeds University's first Diploma in Nursing (DN) in 1921, just before the university began its official diploma examinations for nurses.

During the First World War, Innes was principal matron at the 2nd Northern General Hospital, based at Beckett Park, Leeds. The position included responsibility for the staffing of all the Leeds hospitals which had been taken over by the War Office.

Innes founded the Leeds Infirmary Nurses' League, and oversaw its affiliation with the National Council of Trained Nurses of Great Britain and Ireland. She was a board member of Queen Alexandra's Army Nursing Board, besides being a member of various other nursing institutions.

== Background ==
Euphemia Steele Innes was born in Panbride on 26 February 1874 the eldest daughter of Free Church of Scotland minister James Innes, MA, (1832 – 28 October 1894) and his wife Elizabeth Morris (27 August 1839 – 1888), of Forfarshire, Scotland, who was born in Edinburgh, and died in Panbride. She was named after her maternal grandmother Euphemia Steele.

In 1901, 1911 and 1921 the Census finds Innes in staff accommodation at the Leeds General Infirmary in Great George Street, Leeds. By 1935, Innes had moved with Ada Mary Barnby to 77 Primrose Mansions, London SW11. By 1940 Innes had retired and had returned to Edinburgh. She never married. (Note: Newspapers and documents used as citations in this article, including her obituaries and the Census, called her "Miss Innes" or said she was unmarried.)

In 1929, listed as Euphemia S. Innes, she made an ocean voyage to New York City. She returned from New York on 5 August 1929 via Boston to Liverpool on the Baltic of the White Star Line.

After being ill for some time, Innes died in Newington, Edinburgh, on 9 May 1955. Her last address was 54 Colinton Road, Edinburgh. She was cremated on 13 May 1955 in the same city. A memorial service was held on 7 June 1955 at the Chapel in Leeds General Infirmary. Her Probate was sealed on 27 July 1955.

== Career ==
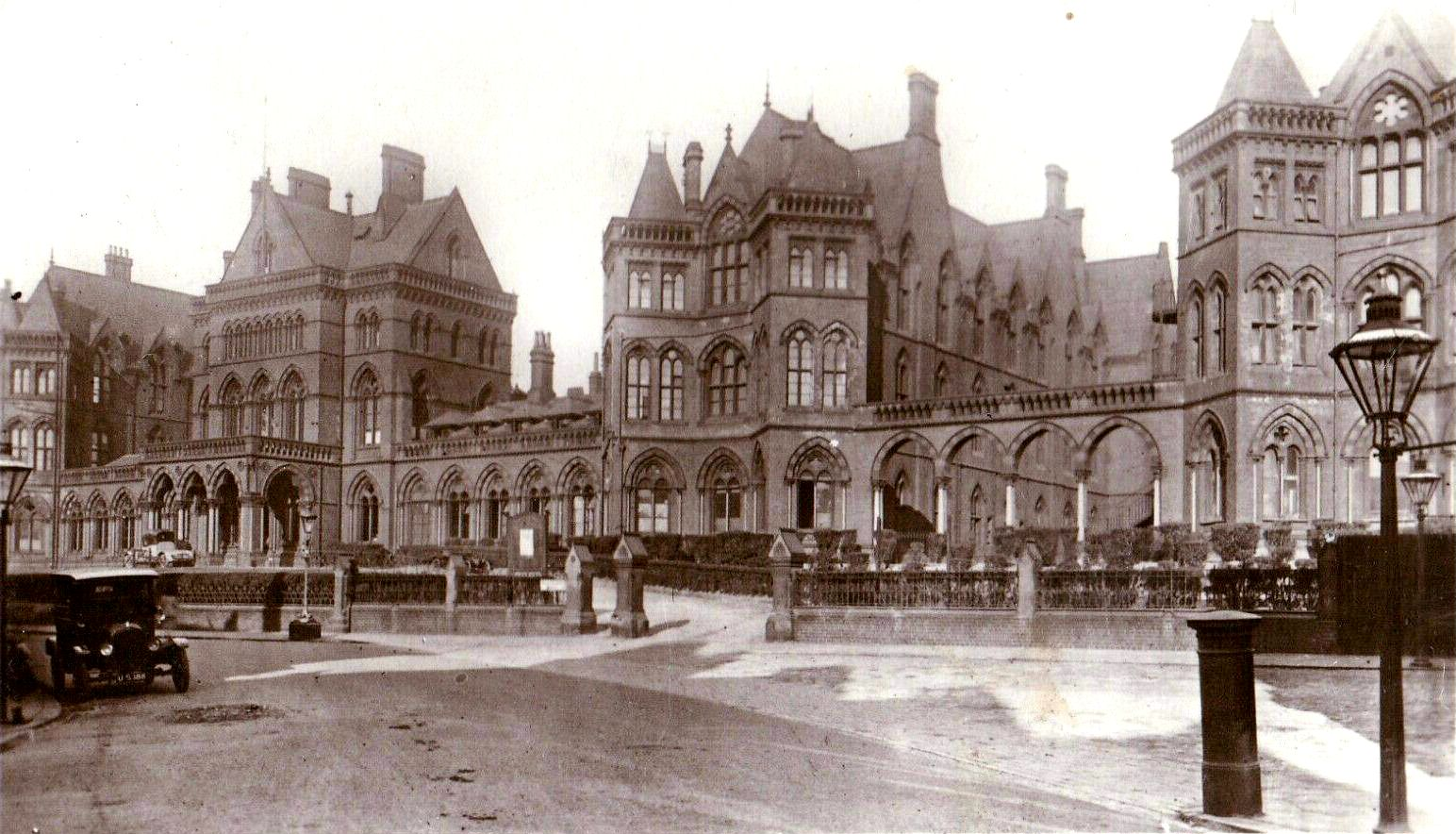
Leeds General Infirmary, 1924

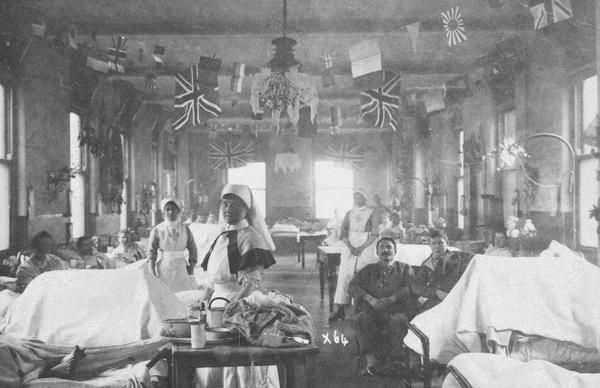
East Leeds War Hospital in the First World War

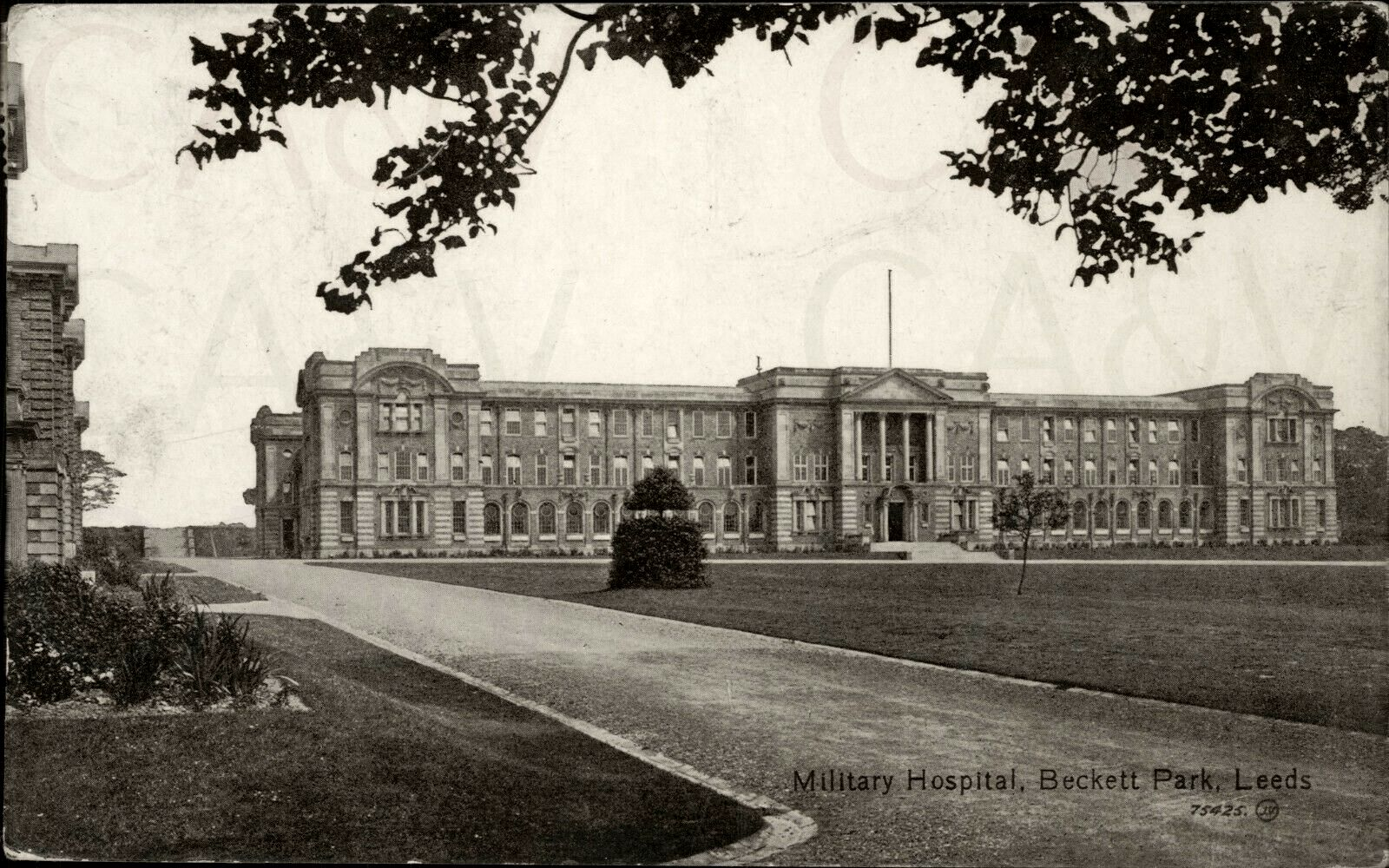
2nd Northern Hospital, 1918

=== Nursing ===
In 1897, Innes began her training as a nurse at Leeds University, Leeds, West Riding of Yorkshire, England, and gained her Diploma in Nursing with honours in 1921, following two decades of service. The diploma was conferred on her as Leeds University's first DN (just before official diploma examinations for nurses began) by the university "in spite of opposition from the Poor Law Guardians" who objected to higher education for nurses.

Innis' initial posts in the West Riding of Yorkshire were casualty sister, ward sister, theatre sister and night superintendent. In 1907 she transferred to the Halifax Royal Infirmary as assistant matron. From 1908 to at least 1916 she was principal matron of the Territorial Force Nursing Service. Moving back and forth, she became assistant lady superintendent at Leeds General Infirmary (1909), matron at Halifax Infirmary (1912), and lady superintendent (known as matron) of Leeds General Infirmary for 21 years from May 1913 to 1934. For this last appointment she was "selected from a large number of applicants".

On 31 July 1914 under the auspices of the Nottinghamshire branch of the British Red Cross Society, in anticipation of the First World War military hospitals, Innes took part in a military casualty treatment demonstration on a grassed area next to the Riding School at Welbeck. This was an annual Red Cross event, but this time affected by expectation of war. Among the aristocratic and military personages in the audience were the Duke and Duchess of Portland and Surgeon-General W.W. Kenny, besides War Office personnel who performed an inspection. During the First World War, Innes was principal matron of the 2nd Northern General Hospital, at Beckett Park, Leeds, and remained in that position until December 1934. She was "responsible for the staffing of the whole of the Leeds hospitals associated with the 2nd Northern General Hospital", i.e. for those Leeds hospitals which had been taken over by the War Office.

On 1 June 1923, Leeds was visited by the Prince of Wales (the future Edward VIII). Since he expressed a wish "to see the people rather than buildings and machinery" there were many presentations among the local worthies, including Innes as matron of the Leeds Infirmary. When the Prince of Wales' parents George V and Mary of Teck visited Leeds in August 1933, they were given a guard of honour on the steps of Leeds Town Hall. The guard of honour was made up of two lines: Innes, the Territorial Army Service, and the staff of Leeds Infirmary and of the Women's Hospital formed one line; the other line was of ex-servicemen. Before entering the Town Hall, the royal couple spoke to the ex-servicemen, but on leaving they stopped and chatted to Innes.

Innes became ill towards the end of her career. She retired from the post of matron at the end of 1934, but was too ill to attend a formal presentation. However, on behalf of numerous contributors, the LGI's committee handed her a cheque for £363 3s 4d (equivalent to £32,567.1 in 2023).

=== Nurses' League ===
Innes founded the Leeds Infirmary Nurses' League in 1925. In 1931, while Innes was president, the LGI Nurses' League was accepted for affiliation with the National Council of Trained Nurses of Great Britain and Ireland. By 1932 it had 200 members, and Innes was still its president. In 1936, Innes organised fund-raising (possibly via the Nurses' League) among past nurses of Leeds General Infirmary, in aid of the same hospital. Her efforts raised £70 (equivalent to £6,007.68 in 2023).

=== Delegate ===
On 24 July 1925, prompted by a previous promise by John Wheatley MP, Innes gave evidence to Neville Chamberlain's 1925 Select Committee of the House of Commons on the General Nursing Council, on behalf of the General Nursing Council of which she was a member. The evidence was in support of a petition for certain adjustments to the examination syllabus for nurses, and "an open election by nurses on the General Part of the State Register, of their eleven direct representatives on the General Nursing Council for England and Wales". The petition was approved, and the change was carried out. In 1938, Innes was "the official delegate appointed to represent the National Council of Nurses of Great Britain at the Golden Jubilee Conference of the International Council of Women held in Edinburgh July 11th to 21st [1938]".

=== Memberships ===
Innes was a member of the following: the Executive Committee of the Hospital Matrons' Association; the Council of the College of Nursing; the General Nursing Council for England and Wales (from 19 May 1922); Queen Alexandra's Army Nursing Board (QAANB), of which Innes was a board member. The QAANB was a 1918 amalgamation of two advisory boards: the Territorial Force Nursing Service and Queen Alexandra's Imperial Military Nursing Service.

As a member of the College of Nursing, Innes wrote in 1926 to The Yorkshire Post and Leeds Intelligencer on the subject of salary and the nursing profession, under its professional association, the College of Nursing, of which she was an active member. She said:

This organisation has done much to improve conditions for nurses – salaries and hours of work have been bettered, and a superannuation scheme with benefits at 55 is well advanced and it is hoped will soon become generally adopted. The College aims at high educational, vocational and economic standards. The members hold that the trained nurse must be well remunerated, but doubt whether the offer of a high salary to a nurse in training attracts the right type of girl to the nursing profession. It must be remembered that a nurse receives much for nothing, including board, lodging, uniform, laundry, care in sickness and professional education – practical and theoretical. For these a girl taking up any other profession would have to pay a substantial sum. The ideal of such a professional association is to put the work first, and to do all in its power to benefit the patients and the community by upholding the best conditions for those who are doing the work.

=== Awards ===
Innes was awarded the Royal Red Cross 1st Class decoration in January 1916 for services given when she was in the Territorial Force Nursing Service and based at Beckett Park Hospital during the First World War.
