= Helen Gregory Smith =

20th-century British nurse

Helen Gregory Smith, CBE, RRC, was a matron at the Glasgow Western Infirmary from 1906 to 1933.

== Education and early career ==
Gregory Smith trained as a nurse at the Glasgow Western Infirmary, starting in 1896 and gained her certificate in 1899. Following her training, she held the posts of sister, night superintendent, home sister, and senior assistant matron at the Western Infirmary.

Gregory Smith briefly left the Western Infirmary in 1904 to take up the position of Lady Superintendent at Dumfries and Galloway Royal Infirmary. She returned to the Western Infirmary in February 1906 when she was appointed matron. She continued as matron until her retirement in 1933.

In 1908, Gregory Smith became principal matron of the Territorial Force Nursing Service 3rd Scottish General Hospital. She was later promoted to Senior Principal Matron. This role included maintaining 1,000 beds as part of the 3rd Scottish General Hospital at Stobhill and taking on the responsibility for 100 beds in the Western Infirmary for wounded soldiers. It also required ensuring there were the correct number of ‘territorial’ nurses, Voluntary Aid Detachments (VADs), special military probationers, and assistant nurses.

In 1918, Gregory Smith was appointed professional civil representative of the Queen Alexandra's Royal Army Nursing Board. From 1928 to 1937, Gregory Smith served on the consultative committee on Medical and Allied Services to the Department of Health for Scotland. From 1928 to 1936, Gregory Smith also served on the Royal College of Nursing Council, of which she was a founding member. She was also president of the Scottish Board of the Royal College of Nursing.

== Personal life ==
Following her retirement from the Western Infirmary, Gregory Smith moved to Budleigh Salterton in Devonshire.

== Honours ==
- 1916 – Decoration of the Royal Red Cross, first class
- 1932 – Commander of the Order of the British Empire
