= Alfred George Barrs =

English physician (1853–1934)

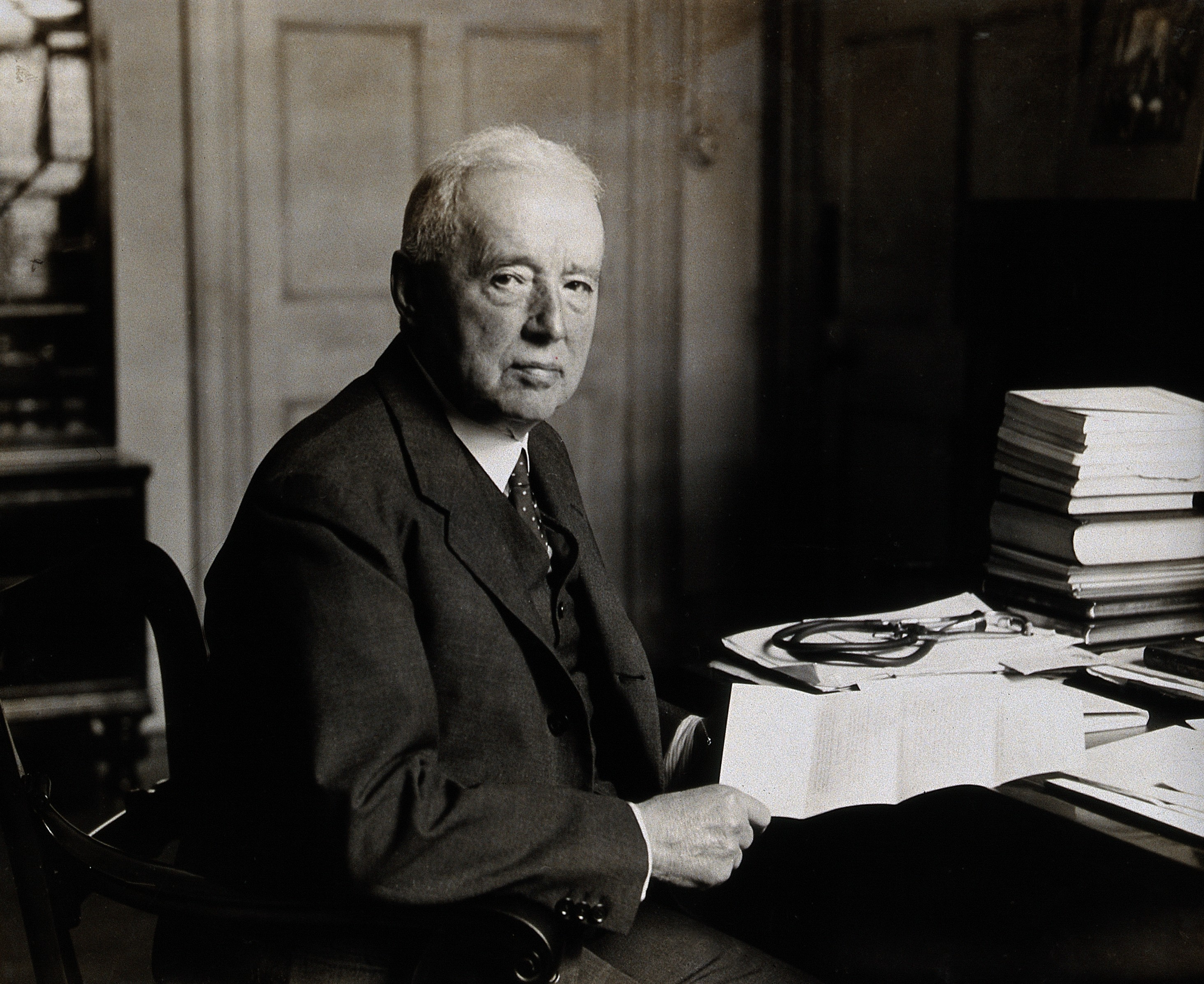
- Born: 1853; Leicester, England
- Died: February 8, 1934 (aged 80–81); Leeds
- Education: University of Edinburgh
- Scientific career
- Workplaces: Guy's Hospital; Leeds General Infirmary; University of Leeds; 2nd Northern General Hospital
- Thesis: On adherent pericardium of rheumatic origin, with cases (1883)

Alfred George Barrs, M.D., F.R.C.P. Hon. LL.D (1853 - 28 February 1934) was an English physician and professor of medicine. He was among the first medical professionals to identify a link between tuberculosis and pleural effusions.

== Life and education ==
Alfred Barrs was born in Leicester in 1853, the son of John Barrs. He was educated at his local grammar school and completed his medical training at Guy's Hospital and the University of Edinburgh. He graduated with a M.B.Ed. in 1875, followed by a M.D. in 1882. In 1884 he became a Member of the Royal College of Physicians (M.R.C.P.) and became a Fellow (F.R.C.P.) in 1897. His doctoral thesis On adherent pericardium of rheumatic origin, with cases was written in 1883.

Barrs was married to Alice Bywater Nelson, daughter of Henry Nelson, solicitor. She died in 1897. They had no children.

== Career ==
Alfred Barrs moved to Leeds in 1879, having previously worked in junior positions at Guy's Hospital. After becoming M.R.C.P. in 1884, he was appointed assistant physician at Leeds General Infirmary, becoming a full physician in 1892 and remaining in this position for twenty years. The areas he worked in included cardiac disease, publishing a paper in the British Medical Journal on the subject in 1892, and dermatology, looking after the dermatological patients as a junior physician. He also submitted four water color drawings to the Dermatological Society of London. In 1890 he published a paper on the tubercular origins of some pleural effusions, one of the first medical professionals to link the two. As well as publishing articles in journals such as the BMJ and British Journal of Dermatology, Barrs also edited Braithwaite's Retrospect of Medicine.

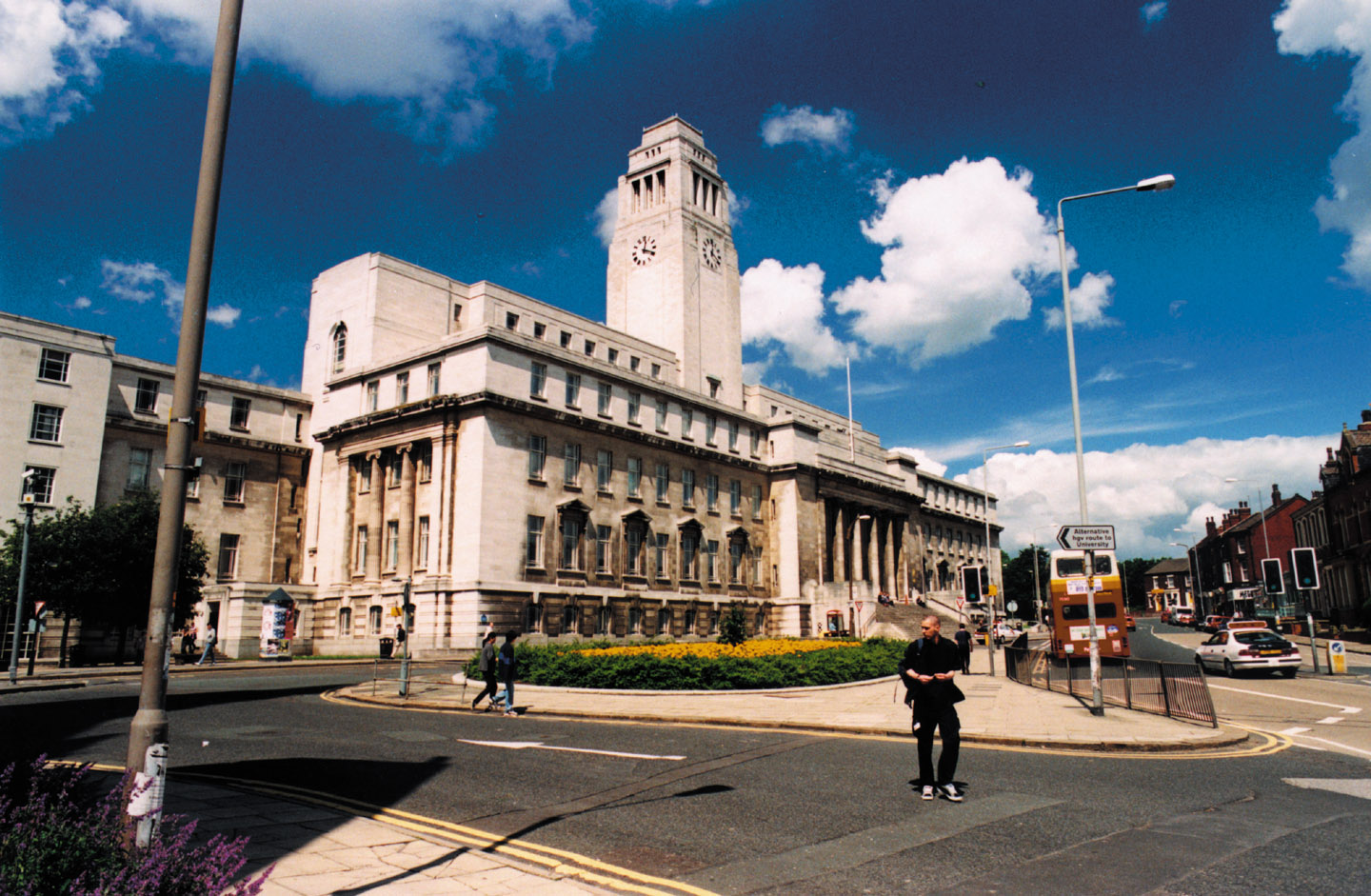
Leeds University, where Alfred Barrs worked and taught.

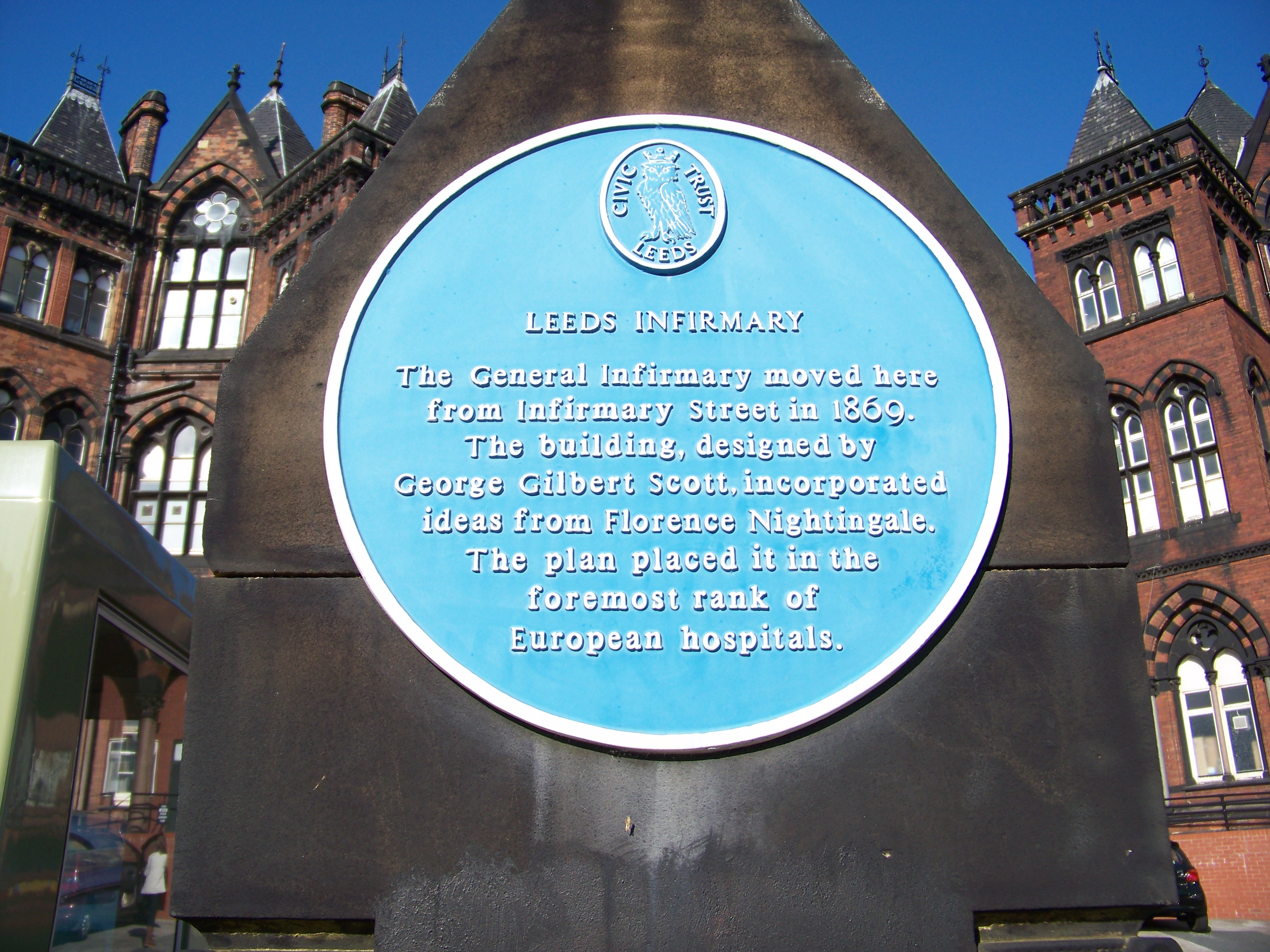
Alfred Barrs began his career as a physician at Leeds General Infirmary

Barrs taught Physiology at Leeds University (he was the university's first Demonstrator of Physiology) before becoming Chair of Medicine from 1899 to 1910, when he became Professor of Clinical Medicine. In 1904, when the university gained its charter (it had previously been Yorkshire College), he became its first representative to the General Medical Council. He was elected emeritus professor of medicine in 1921 and, on the centenary of Leeds medical school in 1931, was awarded an honorary L.L.D. in recognition of his services to medicine.

== World War I ==
When World War I broke out in 1914, Alfred Barrs served in the medical division of the 2nd Northern General Hospital at Beckett Park, Leeds, with the rank of Lieutenant Colonel. The hospital was a former teacher training college and was converted into a hospital on the outbreak of war. It treated around 57,000 soldiers during the course of the war.
