= Vanessa Barrs =

Australian veterinary researcher

- Born: North Carolina, United States
- Education: University of Sydney
- Awards: Fellow of the Australia and New Zealand College of Veterinary Scientists
- Scientific career
- Fields: Veterinary science
- Institutions: University of Sydney

Vanessa Rosemary Duke Barrs is an Australian veterinary researcher in feline infectious diseases. Barrs established clinical research and specialist veterinary services at the Valentine Charlton Cat Centre within the University of Sydney where she is also Professor of Feline Medicine and Infectious Diseases. Barrs discovered Aspergillus felis, an environmental fungus that causes invasive, intractable disease in cats, dogs and humans. She is currently the BOCHK Chair Professor of Veterinary Medicine at City University of Hong Kong's Jockey Club College of Veterinary Medicine and Life Sciences.

== Early life and education ==
She was born in North Carolina while her father, Henry Deacon Barrs, was a visiting CSIRO researcher at Duke University. Barrs is the youngest of three children. She grew up in Griffith, New South Wales.

Barrs studied veterinary science at the University of Sydney, graduating in 1990. While pursuing clinical specialisation, she attained a Master of Veterinary Clinical Studies from the University of Sydney in 1997 and was admitted as a Member of the Australia and New Zealand College of Veterinary Scientists in 1996 and made a Fellowship in 2000.

== Career achievements ==
Barrs has received awards including an Endeavour Research Fellowship in 2011 and the Australian Small Animal Veterinary Association's Distinguished Scientist Award in 2009. Her teaching awards include the Australian Veterinary Association's Excellence in Teaching Award 2008.

She is a scientific editor for the Veterinary Journal (Elsevier), sits on the board of directors of the Australasian Society of Feline Medicine and, until 2018, was the president of the International Society of Companion Animal Infectious Diseases.
