= Panbride =

Coordinates: 56.512287°N 2.698694°W

- Location within Angus
- OS grid reference: NO571358
- Council area: Angus
- Lieutenancy area: Angus
- Country: Scotland
- Sovereign state: United Kingdom
- Post town: CARNOUSTIE
- Postcode district: DD7
- Dialling code: 01241
- Police: Scotland
- Fire: Scottish
- Ambulance: Scottish
- UK Parliament: Dundee East
- Scottish Parliament: Angus; North East Scotland

Panbride is a village and civil parish in the council area of Angus, Scotland. It is situated 0.5 miles (1 km) north-east of Carnoustie and 6 miles (10 km) west of Arbroath.

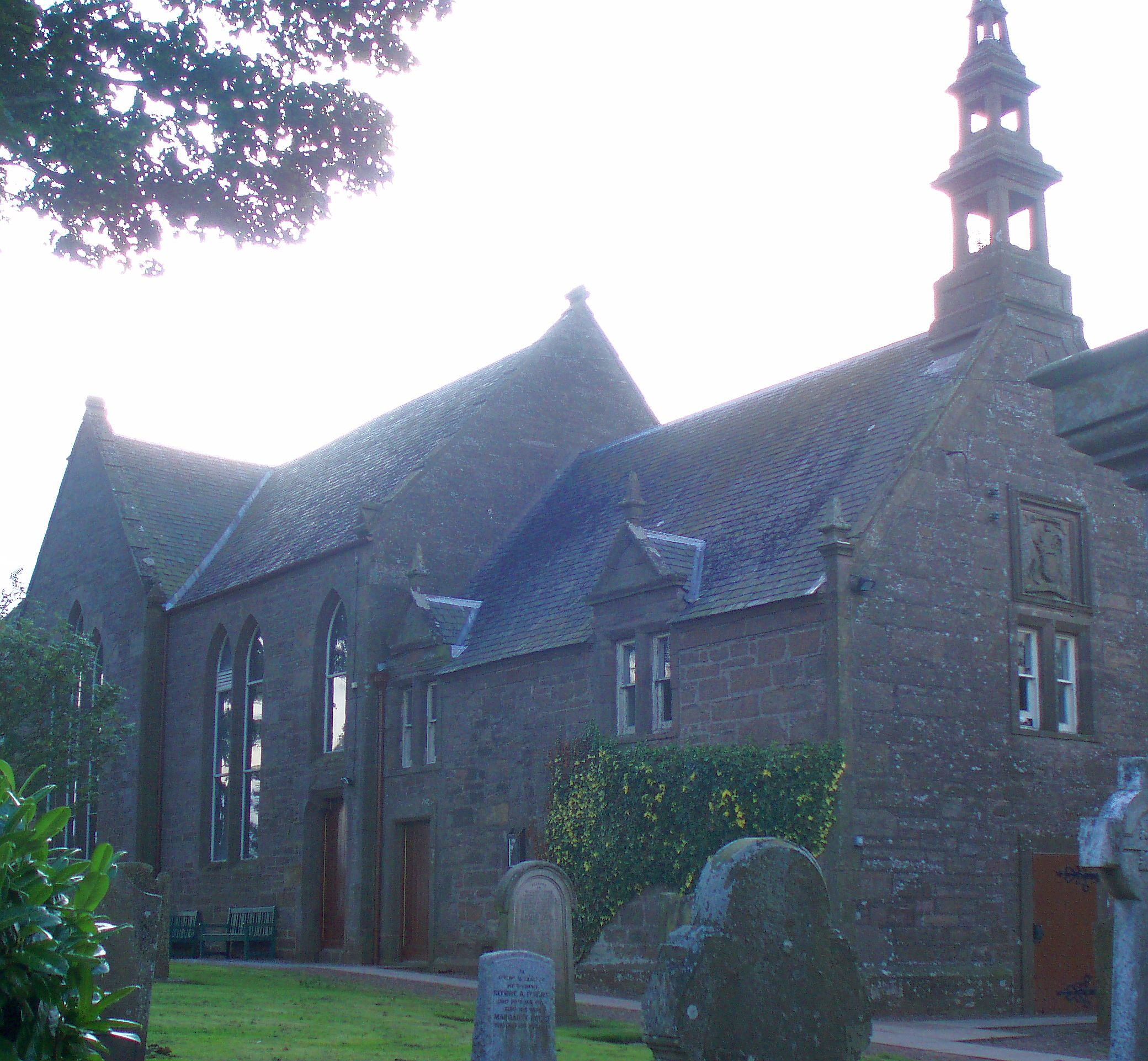
Panbride Kirk

== Etymology ==
The name Panbride may be Pictish in origin, and derived from the element *pant meaning "a hollow".

== History ==
The first recorded owners of the Barony of Panbride was the Morham family, whose ancestral name was Malherbe. They are first mentioned in relation to Panbride in the registers of Arbroath Abbey in a charter of John Morham made in the mid 13th century. It is thought that they had possession of the land until 1309 when Robert I conferred the land to his Brother in Law, Alexander Fraser, Lord Chamberlain of Scotland. Fraser died at the Battle of Dupplin Moor in 1332 and it is thought that David II conferred the barony (at least in part) to the Boyce family in 1341.

The lands of Panbride were fragmented and passed through a number of hands from that point, and were gradually acquired by the Carnegie family, later to become the Earls of Northesk, in the 16th century. The lands were forfeited following the Jacobite rebellion but were bought back by James Carnegie in 1764. Carnegie used the lands to purchase lands near his main estate and the barony of Panbride passed to William Maule, linking Panbride with Panmure.

Panbride church's minister in 1717 was father of the next minister who was the father of the next - and he was the father of Rev. David Trail who was also the minister. A record for one family in the church of Scotland. David Trail died in 1850 but his daughter Ann Agnes Trail went on to found a convent in Edinburgh.

Between the census years of 1801 and 1831, the parish's population fell by some 20% from 1,583 to 1,268, due largely to the removal of several villages in the name of Agricultural improvement.

== Notable people ==
- Euphemia Steele Innes, RRC, DN (1874–1955), born in Panbride parish, was matron of Leeds General Infirmary for 21 years

== See also ==
- Carnoustie
