= Ann Agnes Trail =

Scottish Roman Catholic Ursuline nun, artist and educator

Sister Agnes Xavier Trail, O.S.U.
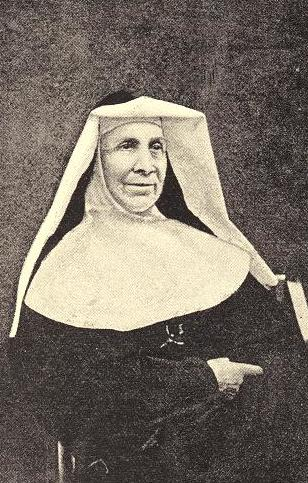
- Sister Agnes Xavier, O.S.U.
- Born: Ann Agnes Trail; 17 February 1798; Panbride, Angus, Scotland, Kingdom of Great Britain
- Died: 3 December 1872 (aged 74); Edinburgh, Scotland, United Kingdom of Great Britain and Ireland
- Occupations: Nun, artist and educator
- Known for: St Margaret's Convent, Edinburgh "unique Presbyterian feminist"

Agnes Xavier Trail, O.S.U., (17 February 1798 – 3 December 1872) was a Scottish Ursuline nun, artist and educator. She took a leading role in establishing St Margaret's Convent in Edinburgh, Scotland, the first Catholic convent established in Scotland since the Scottish Reformation.

== Life ==
She was born Ann Agnes Trail in Panbride, Angus, in 1798. She came from an unusual family in that her great grandfather, grandfather and father had all led the same church in Scotland. Trail was educated at home, but in return she had to teach her ten siblings. She was given an 18-month break when she was seventeen but then returned to teaching her brothers and sisters. She did good works and was a teacher at an Irish charity school.

Trail decided to be an artist and she was taught these skills before 1824. She set off for Italy in 1826, having already completed commissions for customers in London. She travelled to paint in Florence and Venice but she returned to Rome twice. She had met David Wilkie and others vied for her attention but she saw her future in the Catholic Church after talking with Augustine Baines, O.S.B., a missionary bishop to Great Britain. In 1828, while still in Italy, she was received into the Catholic Church by Cardinal Carlo Odescalchi. Trail was to later paint his portrait.

Later Trail was in England where she met the Canadian-born Catholic priest James Gillis in Hammersmith in 1832. He shared his ambition to help start a convent school and Trail became committed to supporting this plan. The following year she and another Scotswoman entered the Ursuline monastery at Chavagnes, France. There Trail took the religious name of Agnes Xavier.

Trail returned to Edinburgh in 1834, part of a founding community of seven French nuns and two lay sisters. St Margaret's Convent was then established, and within months they had enrolled new novices. The original plan had been more ambitious as plans were created for a new cathedral besides the convent. The enterprise was funded by businessperson John Menzies who gave the land. Although St Margaret's Convent was the first new convent in Scotland, nearly twenty new convents were established in the country over the next 50 years.

Tail would paint miniatures in the convent and teach drawing but importantly she socialised with upper- and middle-class women. Trail also created paintings of leading Catholics including Gillis.

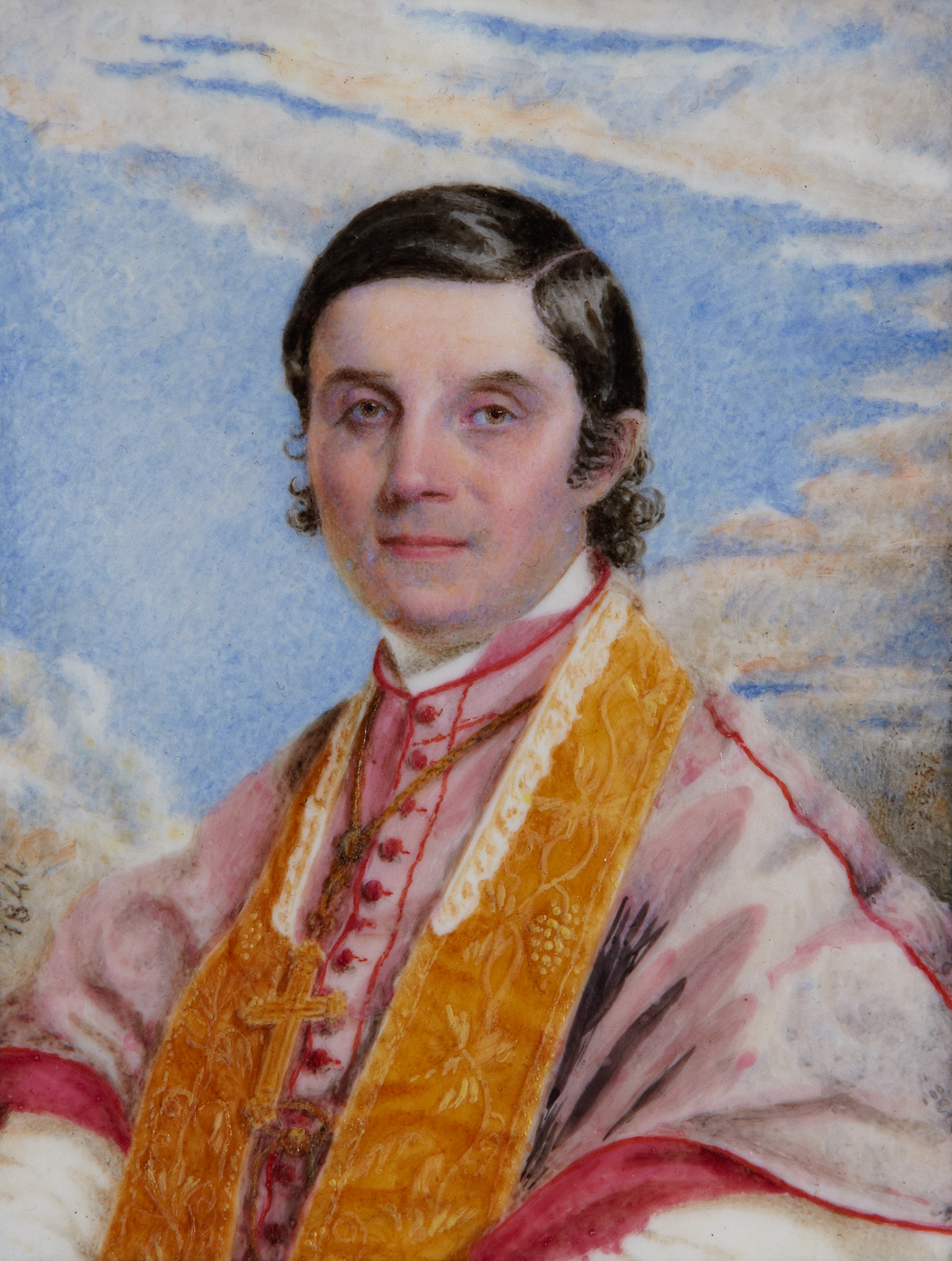
Bishop James Gillis in 1841 by Trail

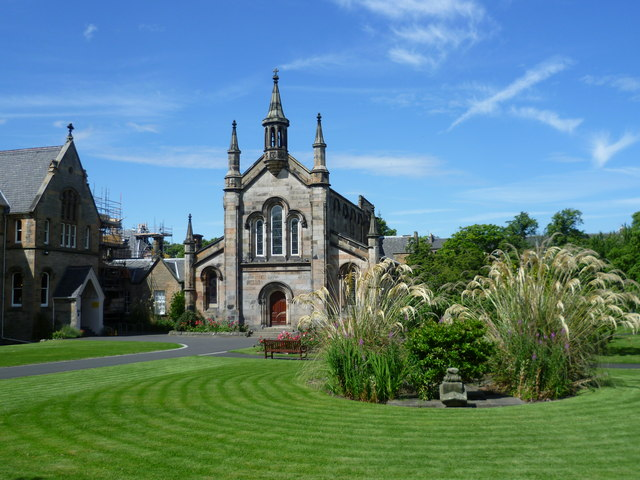
St Margaret's Convent today

== Death and legacy ==
She was described as a "unique Presbyterian feminist". She died in 1872 and in 1886 a book was published concerning the history of "her" convent and her autobiography.
