= Caroline Keer =

British military nurse and nursing administrator

Matron-in-Chief Caroline Keer RRC*
- Born: 1857
- Died: 29 December 1928 (aged 71); West Worthing, Worthing, Sussex
- Relatives: Honoria Somerville Keer (half-sister)
- Military career
- Allegiance: United Kingdom
- Branch: British Army
- Service years: 1887–1910
- Rank: Matron-in-Chief
- Commands: Queen Alexandra's Imperial Military Nursing Service (1906–1910)
- Conflicts: Second Boer War
- Awards: Royal Red Cross & Bar

Caroline Keer, RRC & Bar (1857 – 29 December 1928) was a British military nurse and nursing administrator who served in Natal during the Second Boer War. She was matron-in-chief of Queen Alexandra's Imperial Military Nursing Service between 1906 and 1910.

== Early life ==
Caroline Helen Keer was born in India in 1857. Her father was Major-General Jonathan Keer (1825–1907), then serving in the HM Bengal Staff Corps. Surgeon Honoria Somerville Keer was a younger paternal half-sister.

Keer was sent to school in Malvern in England, and lived there after completing her education until her father moved to Canada, when she joined him. She went to study nursing at Boston under Miss Drown, Superintendent of Nursing at Boston City Hospital. Keer returned to Britain in 1887.

== Nursing career ==
Keer served with the British Army's Nursing Service from December 1887, where she nursed at the Royal Victoria Military Hospital, Netley, before she was posted to Egypt from 1888 to 1894. She was based in Dover for the next five years. She served in Natal during the Second Boer War in 1899, for which she received the Royal Red Cross and the Queen's and King's South African medals. She returned to Britain at the end of the war and was based in Colchester, where she joined Queen Alexandra's Imperial Military Nursing Service (QAIMNS).

In 1903, Keer was appointed principal matron at Pretoria, South Africa. At the time of her appointment there were 14 military hospitals serving soldiers and their families; a central duty of her position was to supervise and inspect each hospital. Upon her appointment as matron-in-chief, the British Journal of Nursing reported:

Miss Keer has many qualifications for the high office to which she has been appointed. Her quiet, modest confidence, confidence evidently born of knowledge, cannot fail to beget the conviction that the choice which placed the reins of government in this important position in her hands and that she will maintain the dignity and prestige which the Service has acquired during the tenure of office of the present Matron-in-Chief Miss Sidney Browne, R.R.C. During her time as the Matron in Chief Miss Keer was involved in improving the pay, allowances and conditions of the nurses of the QAIMNS and making changes to the Military Families Hospitals.

Keer was appointed as matron-in-chief of Queen Alexandra's Royal Army Nursing Corps from 5 April 1906, succeeding Sidney Browne. She served until 5 April 1910, retiring two months later. She was granted permission to retain the badge of QAIMNS, in "recognition of her Iong and meritorious service". Ethel Becher succeeded her in the role of matron-in-chief.

== Death ==
Caroline Keer died on 29 December 1928, aged 71, at her home in West Worthing, Sussex from undisclosed causes.
