= Honoria Somerville Keer =

British medical doctor and surgeon

Honoria Somerville Keer MBChB
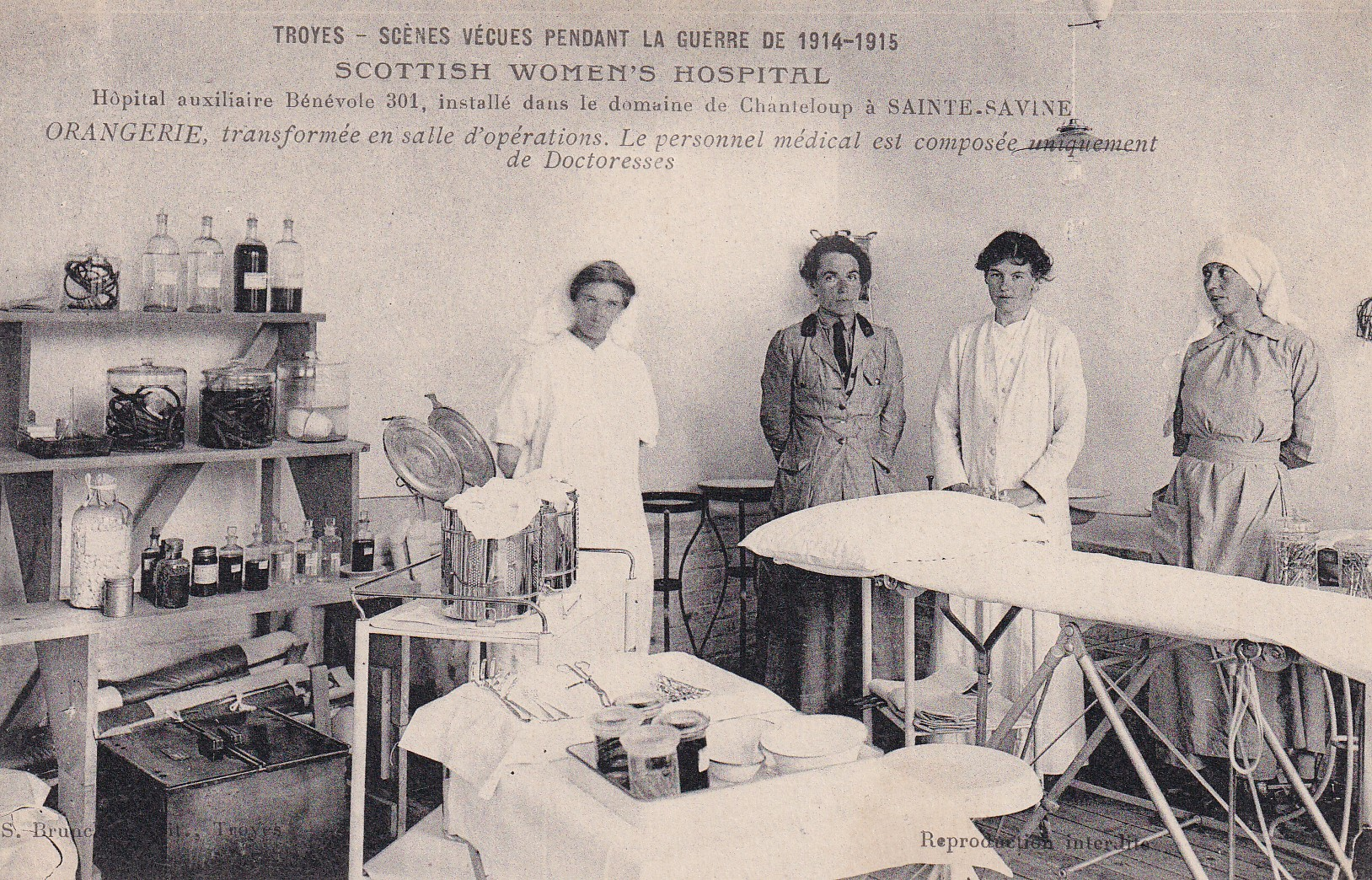
- Drs. Honoria Keer and Louise McIlroy in 1915
- Born: 26 December 1883; Toronto, Canada
- Died: 20 March 1969 (aged 85); London, England
- Relatives: Caroline Keer
- Medical career
- Field: Surgery
- Institutions: Scottish Women's Hospitals for Foreign Service
- Awards: French Croix de Guerre and Médaille des Épidémies, and Serbian Order of St Sava

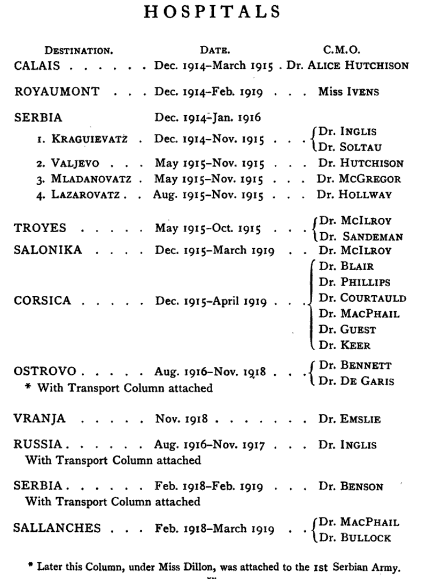
Scottish Women's Hospital destinations, dates of operation, and Chief Medical Officers

Honoria Somerville Keer (26 December 1883 – 20 March 1969) was a British surgeon during World War I, where she served as a medical officer with the Girton and Newnham Unit of the Scottish Women's Hospitals for Foreign Service, which offered volunteer opportunities for medical women, who were prohibited at the time from serving with the Royal Army Medical Corps. She was honoured by France and Serbia for her services.

== Early life and education ==
Honoria Somerville Keer was born in Toronto, Canada, the daughter of Eliza Somerville (1848–1921) and Major General Jonathan Keer (1825–1907), formerly of HM Bengal Staff Corps. Military nurse Caroline Keer was her elder paternal half-sister. Honoria studied medicine at the University of Glasgow and graduated MBChB in 1910; she was registered as a medical practitioner in April of the same year.

She worked initially at Glasgow Royal Asylum, Gartnavel, and as House Surgeon at Kilmarnock, then joined the Girton and Newnham Unit of the Scottish Women's Hospitals in 1915.

== Service in World War I ==
She served as a medical officer first in France (Domaine de Chanteloup, at Sainte-Savine, near Troyes) with Scottish Women's Hospitals, and then in Salonika. In 1918 she became Chief Medical Officer of the unit for medical care of Serbian refugees in Ajaccio, Corsica, until 1919.

For her wartime service she was awarded the French Croix de Guerre and Médaille des Épidémies, and the Serbian Order of St Sava. Keer was described by one of her colleagues, Isabel Emslie, as 'a strange mass of contradictions: serious, reserved, and with very correct old-world manners'; at the same time, 'her sly wit was a constant joy'.

== Later career ==
After obtaining the Diploma in Tropical Medicine & Hygiene from the London School of Tropical Medicine (1924), Keer was appointed to the post of Lady Medical Officer at the Massey Street Dispensary, Lagos, Nigeria, where she worked, except for a period of home/sick leave in 1931, until 1934.

In that year, she retired to live in Bayswater, London, as illness abroad had resulted in hearing problems. In World War II she was active in civil defence with the Women's Voluntary Service.

She died in London in 1969.

== Awards and honours ==
- Croix de Guerre (France)
- Médaille d'Honneur (France)
- Order of St. Sava (Serbia) medals for her services during the Great War.
