= Rachael Cox-Davies =

British nurse (1862-1944)

Rachael Cox-Davies CBE, RRC Bar
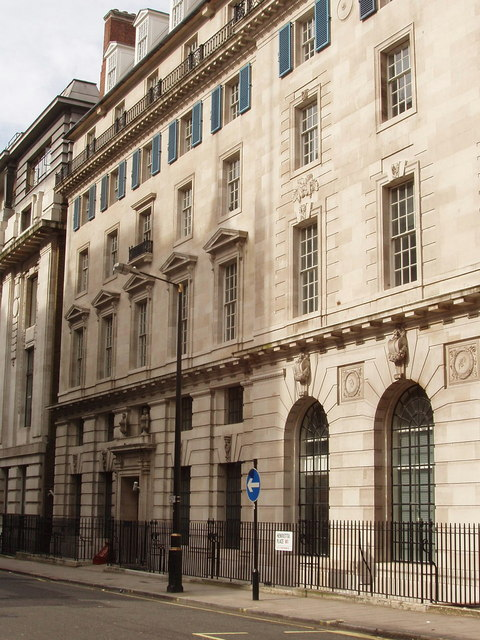
- The Royal College of Nursing's headquarters at 1 Henrietta Place/20 Cavendish Street, which Rachael Cox-Davies secured.
- Born: 4 September 1862
- Died: 30 October 1944 (aged 82)
- Occupation: Matron
- Employer: Royal Free Hospital
- Organization: Royal College of Nursing

Rachael Annie Cox-Davies CBE, RRC Bar (1862 – 1944) was a British nurse, matron of the Royal Free Hospital, a leader in establishing the nursing profession in the United Kingdom and founding member of the Royal College of Nursing.

== Early life ==
She was born in Llangenny on 4 September 1862, the fourth of five children of attorney Edward Cox Davies and his wife Charlotte, née Homfray.

== Early nursing career ==
Educated at the Anglican St Stephen's College, Clewer, she trained as a nurse, first at the Newport and County Hospital (1889–93) and then at St Bartholomew's Hospital, London (1893 to 1896) under the matron-ship of Isla Stewart. She held a number of posts over the next six years including night sister, home sister and sister of Faith ward. Cox-Davies was the first secretary of the newly formed League of St. Bartholomew's Nurses in 1899. She was granted leave of absence to join Princess Christian's Army Nursing Service in the South African War (1899-1902) first at the Portland Field Hospital and then in Pretoria. She was mentioned in dispatches for meritorious service at the Portland Hospital

== Later nursing career ==
Cox-Davies was appointed matron of the Royal Devon and Exeter Hospital (1902) and then New Hospital for Women in Soho (1903). In 1905 she was appointed matron of the Royal Free Hospital, where she remained until her retirement in 1922. In 1908 she was invited to be on the first Advisory Council establishing the Territorial Force Nursing Service by Lord Haldane. She served as a principal matron of the Territorial Force Nursing Service and was appointed a Lady of Grace in the Order of St John in March 1912.

== World War I ==
She received the Royal Red Cross (First Class) in January 1916 with the addition of a bar in January 1919 in recognition for her work as principal matron of the First London General Hospital, a temporary military hospital during World War I.

== Royal College of Nursing and other positions ==
In 1916 she was one of the founding members of the College of Nursing, and remained on its council for the rest of her life. She contributed to the establishment of the college's Irish board and is credited with securing the present headquarters of the college by persuading Annie Pearson, Viscountess Cowdray, in the course of a ten-minute taxi ride, to donate a new building at 20 Cavendish Square.

She also held the posts of honorary secretary of the Association of Hospital Matrons, which she helped to found, and director of the National Council of Nurses, and was member of several General Nursing Council committees.

In June 1923 she was appointed CBE.

== Awards and honours ==
1901 South Africa War Medal and Clasp

1912 Lady of Grace Order of St. John

1916 Royal Red Cross

1919 Royal Red Cross Bar

1923 Birthday Honours Commander of the Order of the British Empire (CBE)

== Death and legacy ==
She died at her home in St John's Wood, London, on 30 October 1944.

Royal Free Hospital offers a Rachael Cox-Davies scholarship in her name.
