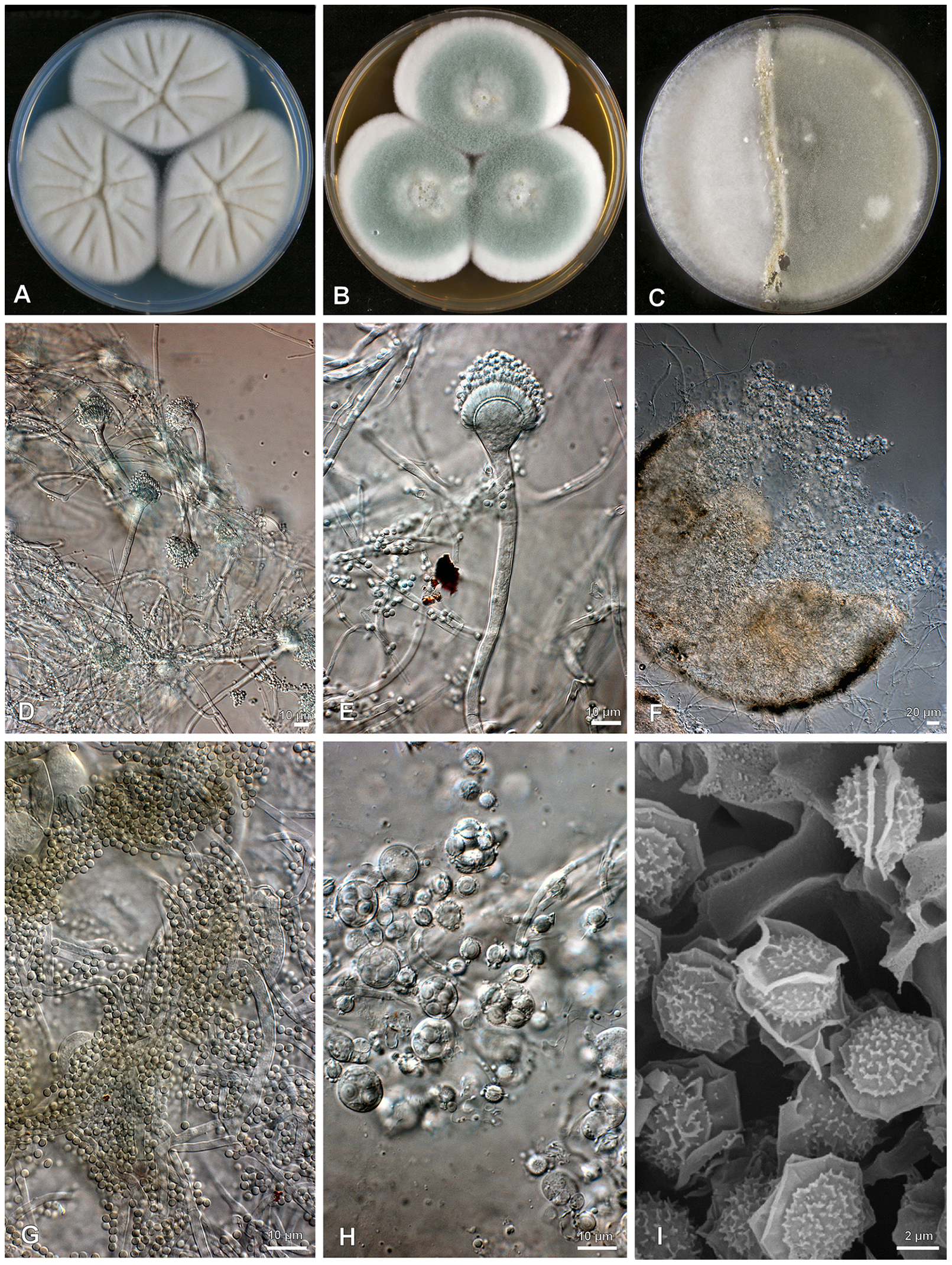
- Colonies growing 7 days at 25°C on CYA (A) and MEA (B); Crossing of CBS 130245 and 130246 at 30°C (C); Conidiophores and conidia (D, E and G); Cleistothecium (F); Ascospores (H-I).

Scientific classification
- Kingdom: Fungi
- Division: Ascomycota
- Class: Eurotiomycetes
- Order: Eurotiales
- Family: Aspergillaceae
- Genus: Aspergillus
- Species: A. felis

Binomial name
- Aspergillus felis Barrs, van Doorn, Varga & Samson, 2013

Type strain
- 131F4, DTO 155G2, IFM 600, JV-2013, CBS 130245, CBS H-21125

= Aspergillus felis =

Species of fungus

Aspergillus felis is a heterothallic species of fungus in the genus Aspergillus which can cause aspergillosis in humans, dogs and cats. It was described for the first time in 2013 after being isolated from different hosts worldwide (North and South America, Europe, Africa, Northeast Asia, and Asia-Pacific).

The first host infected was a domestic cat with invasive fungal rhinosinusitis who gave its name to this new Aspergillus as Felis is a genus of cats in the family Felidae. Apsergillus felis was then described in a dog with disseminated invasive aspergillosis and a human patient with chronic invasive pulmonary aspergillosis. The most common host described with A. felis infection is the cat. This may be explained by anatomical differences in the nasal cavity and paranasal sinuses resulting in preferential deposition of inhaled fungal spores within the sinonasal cavity in cats compared to the lower respiratory tract in humans. A.felis is an important emerging agent of invasive aspergillosis in cats, dogs and humans because it is often refractory to aggressive antifungal treatment and its identification implies molecular and morphological techniques.

According to mating-type analysis, Aspergillus felis has a fully functioning reproductive cycle as induction of teleomorphs appears within 7 to 10 days in vitro and there is also ascospore germination.

== Pathogenicity ==
Among all cases reported, A. felis can give serious different diseases depending on hosts:

- Cats: chronic invasive fungal rhinosinusitis and retrobulbar masses (chronic invasive pulmonary aspergillosis or sinonasal aspergillosis)
- Dog: disseminated invasive aspergillosis (IA), fungal rhinosinusitis (FRS)
- Human: chronic invasive pulmonary aspergillosis (IPA)

A.felis causes infection in immunocompetent cats and dogs and immunocompromised patients.

== Identification ==
Aspergillus felis' identification is difficult because of its resemblance with other species within the Aspergillus viridinutans complex (A. felis, A. viridinutans sensu stricto, A. udagawae, A. pseudofelis, A. parafelis, A. pseudoviridinutans, A. wyonmingesis A. aureoles, A. siamensis and A. arcoverdensis). Many methods has to be used together in order to identify it correctly.

=== Culture ===
A.felis can be isolated on malt extract agar (MEA) or Czapek agar (CYA).

- MEA: Colonies reach a diameter of 5.5 cm in 7 days at 25 °C. It is cream to light green and it is more or less velvety with abundant greenish sporulation occurring after 5 to 7 days.
- CYA: Colonies have a diameter up to 5.0 - 5.5 cm in 7 days at 25 °C. It is white and the texture is mostly floccose. Sporulation is often poor.

=== Morphology ===
Aspergillus felis has greenish stipes and nodding heads. Vesicles have a diameter of 15–16.5 μm. Conidia are green, globose to subglobose, finely roughened and 1.5–2.5 μm in dimensions. Cleistothecia are white to creamish and have a diameter of 100–230 μm. Asci are globose, 8-spored, 12–16 μm in diameter. Ascospores are lenticular with two prominent equatorial crests and with short echinulate convex surfaces 5.0–7.0×3.5–5.0 μm.

Morphological criteria alone are not enough to reliably identify A. felis. Nodding heads can be seen on cytological examination but this feature occurs in other Fumigati species. Furthermore, A. felis, N. aureola and A. udagawae all produce lenticular ascospores with two prominent equatorial crests and an echinulate convex surface. The use of different temperatures seems to be a solution as A. felis is able to grow at 45 °C while it has been shown in several studies that A. viridinutans and A. udagawae showed no growth at 45 °C. A. fumigatus is able to grow at 50 °C whereas A. felis is not. It can be a relevant method to distinguish A. felis from other species since A. felis is a thermotolerant fungus with a maximum growth temperature of 45 °C and a minimum growth temperature of 20 °C whereas species in the AVC have optimal growth between 35° and 42 °C. Nevertheless, playing on temperatures is not as precise as molecular identification.

=== Molecular identification ===
The use of PCR to amplify alpha and HMG domains of genes is mentioned in some articles but the best method remains comparative sequence analysis of multiple loci such as ITS-1, ITS-2, the 5.8S rDNA gene and parts of the β-tubulin (benA) and calmodulin (calM) gene. A. felis can be reliably identified with ITS sequences only but the most commonly used genes that have been used for species descriptions are benA and caM. Currently, there is no gene accepted as a stand-alone method for identification.

The gold standard method is using both molecular and morphological techniques to avoid misidentification with different species within the same complex which would explain why only a few clinical cases of A. felis in humans have been described so far.

== Treatment ==
Susceptibilities of several A. felis isolates to amphotericin B, itraconazole, posaconazole, voriconazole, fluconazole, flucytosine, terbinafine, caspofungin, anidulafungin and micafungin were assessed in cats. No activity was observed for fluconazole or flucytosine against A. felis. Minimum Inhibitory Concentrations (MICs) for triazole antifungals were higher than usual and cross-resistance to itraconazole/voriconazole and itraconazole/voriconazole/posaconazole was observed for some isolates. Most of the time, aggressive therapy (itraconazole or posaconazole as monotherapy or combined with amphotericin B, or with amphotericin B and terbinafine) failed for cats. The majority were euthanased due to disease progression with severe signs.

Few cases of invasive disease in humans have been reported in the literature. Infections are often fatal because of A. felis being identified as another cryptic Aspergillus species. Indeed, the right treatment is delayed leading to fatal issues.

The primary therapy that has been used for invasive aspergillosis in humans was voriconazole, with isavuconazole and amphotericin B as alternatives for treatment failures. A case of cranial aspergillosis with A. felis was reported in a 66-year-old male with chronic lymphocytic leukaemia and was successfully managed with voriconazole and surgery followed by maintenance with posaconazole.
