= Sidney Browne =

British nurse

Matron-in-Chief Dame Sidney Browne GBE RRC*
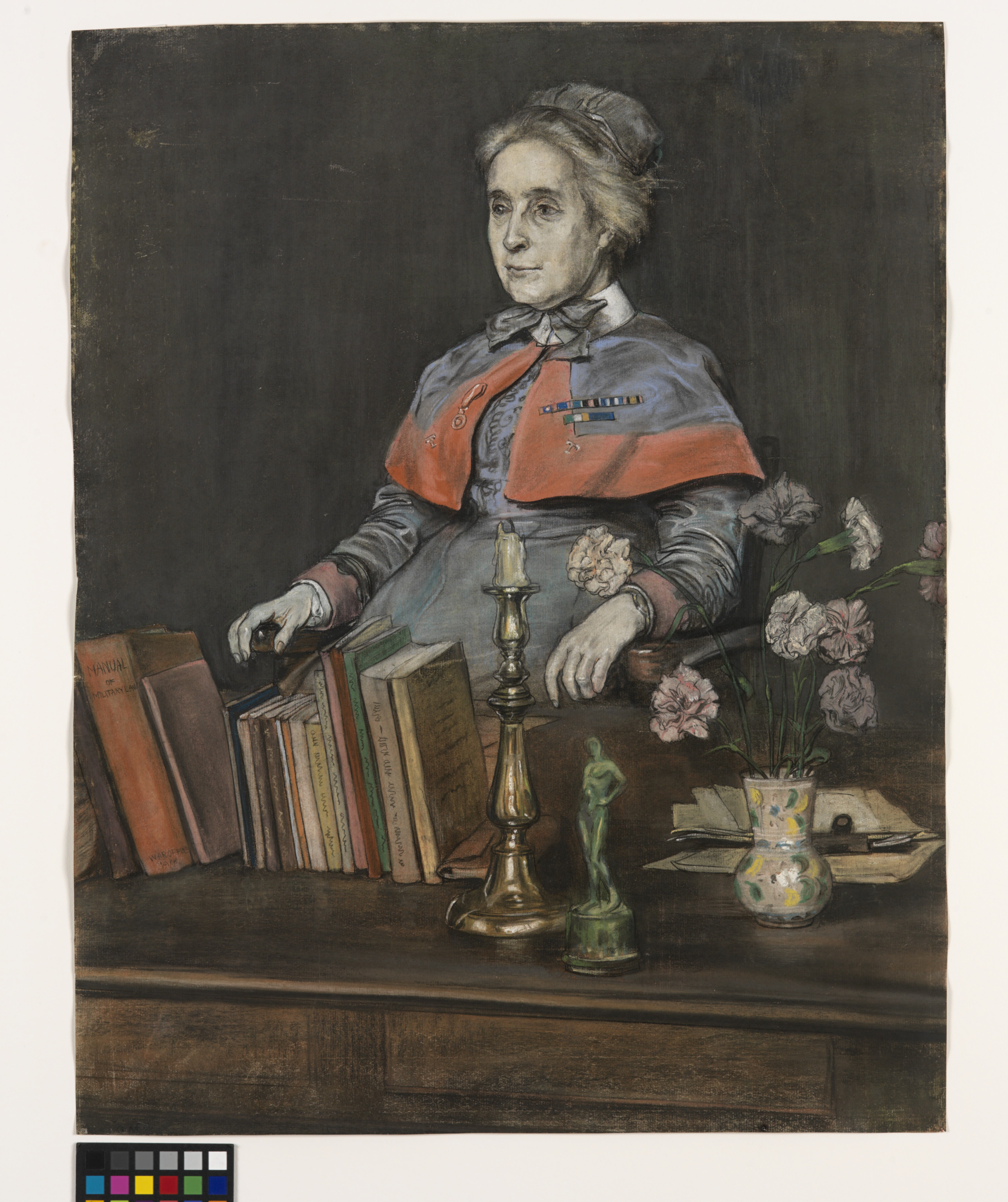
- Born: 5 January 1850; Bexley, Kent, England
- Died: 13 August 1941 (aged 91); Cheltenham, Gloucestershire, England
- Military career
- Allegiance: United Kingdom
- Branch: British Army
- Service years: 1883–1906; 1908–1919
- Rank: Matron-in-Chief
- Commands: Queen Alexandra's Imperial Military Nursing Service (1902–1906); Territorial Force Nursing Service (1910–1919)
- Conflicts: Anglo-Egyptian War; Mahdist War; Second Boer War; First World War
- Awards: Dame Grand Cross of the Order of the British Empire; Royal Red Cross & Bar; Florence Nightingale Medal
- Other work: President of the Royal College of Nursing (1922–1925)

Dame Sidney Jane Browne, GBE, RRC & Bar (5 January 1850 – 13 August 1941) was the first appointed Matron-in-Chief of the newly formed Queen Alexandra's Imperial Military Nursing Service (QAIMNS). After she retired from the QAIMNS she was appointed as Matron-in-Chief of the Territorial Force Nursing Service. Browne was appointed a Dame Grand Cross of the Order of the British Empire in 1919 and, in 1922, she became the first President of the Royal College of Nursing, a post she held until 1925.

== Early life ==
Sidney Browne was born in Bexley. She grew up in a medical family, with a surgeon father and two brothers who were doctors.

== Nursing career ==
Browne attended a series of lectures given by the pioneering district nurse Florence Lees, which prompted her interest in nursing as a career. In 1878 she briefly started nursing at the Guest Hospital, Dudley, and later that year entered training at the District Hospital West Bromwich. In 1882 Browne worked as Staff Nurse at St Bartholomew's Hospital for a year, where she was influenced by the matron, Ethel Manson (later Mrs Ethel Gordon Fenwick). Browne was one of the first nurses registered with the British Nurses' Association on 7 March 1890, the precursor of the State Register of Nurses.

In 1883, Browne joined the Army Nursing Service, where she was posted to the Royal Victoria Hospital, Netley and in 1884 had her first overseas posting during the Anglo-Egyptian War. For her work in the Mahdist War she received the Khedive's Star and the Egyptian medal and clasp (1885). Browne's postings took her to Malta (1887–1890), Ireland (Curragh Camp), Woolwich (Herbert Hospital) and Aldershot, rising steadily through the ranks.

Browne was posted to active service in the Second Boer War from October 1899, where over the next three years she was superintending sister at three different base hospitals, for which she received the Royal Red Cross. Significant reforms of medical services led to the establishment of an army nursing service. In 1902, Browne was returned to England for her next post as the first Matron-in-Chief of the newly created Queen Alexandra's Imperial Military Nursing Service (QAIMNS) — now Queen Alexandra's Royal Army Nursing Corps — where she introduced rigorous training procedures. She retired from the Army in 1906 at age 55, which gave her the time to be an active campaigner for the state registration of nurses. She was succeeded as Matron-in-Chief of QAIMNS by Caroline Keer.

Browne was still concerned about the lack of trained nurses available to the army and, with Elisabeth Haldane, established the Territorial Force Nursing Service (TFNS), a civilian trained nursing reserve, in 1908, for which she became Matron-in-Chief from 1910. With the outbreak of the First World War in 1914, Browne was responsible for the mobilisation of the TFNS, and its expansion from 3,000 to 7,000 nurses. Browne travelled across Britain and abroad inspecting living and working conditions of her nursing staff. Her work was recognised with a Bar to her Royal Red Cross. In 1918, Browne told her nurses: "Put a high ideal before you, and do your future service in a greater strength than your own, and your life will be for the betterment of the world."

In 1916, Browne, who had long supported the nursing state registration bill, agreed that the time was right for a College of Nursing to be established. Both Browne and Sarah Swift had worked as Matron-in-Chief during the First World War, and both became actively involved in what was to become the Royal College of Nursing. Browne was a member of the first Royal College of Nursing Council from 1917 until her retirement in 1927 and was the first Honorary Treasurer of the college as well as the inaugural President (1922–25).

== Awards ==
Browne was recognised for her work in the First World War in the 1919 New Year Honours, when she was appointed a Dame Grand Cross of the Order of the British Empire. The insignia of the damehood was conferred at an investiture on 31 July 1919. She received many honours for her work including an honorary degree in 1925 from Leeds University, the freedom of West Bromwich; and in July 1927, she was awarded the International Florence Nightingale Medal by the League of Red Cross Societies.

== Later life and legacy ==
Browne lived in Cheltenham with her friend Hilda Hoole from 1927. Browne died on 13 August 1941, with her funeral taking place at St Stephen's Church Cheltenham.

In December 2017 a blue plaque was unveiled at her former home, 11 Tivoli Road, by the Cheltenham Civic Society and the Royal College of Nursing.

== Sources ==
- Oxford Dictionary of National Biography
- Anne Summers, Angels and Citizens: British Women As Military Nurses, 1854-1914, Routledge Kegan & Paul (January 1, 1988), ISBN 978-0710214799
- Gazette Issue 27944 published on the 28 August 1906 :"Miss Sidney J. Browne, R.R.C., late Matron-in-Chief, is granted permission to retain the Badge of Queen Alexandra's Imperial Military Nursing Service, in recognition of her long and meritorious service." (dated 28 August 1906)
- Gazette Issue 31097 published on the 31 December 1918 :"The King has been graciously pleased to give orders for the following promotions in and appointments to the Most Excellent Order of the British Empire, for valuable services rendered in connection with the War [World War I];-- To be a Dame Grand Cross of the Military Division of the said Most Excellent Order: – Miss Sidney Jane Browne, R.R.C., Matron-in-Chief, Territorial Nursing Service." (dated 31 December 1918)
- McGann, Susan (1992). Battle of the Nurses: a study of eight women who influenced the development of professional nursing 1880–1930. London: Scutari. ISBN 1-871364-62-0.

Academic offices
New office	President of the Royal College of Nursing; 1922–1925	Succeeded by Sarah Swift
