= Territorial Force Nursing Service =

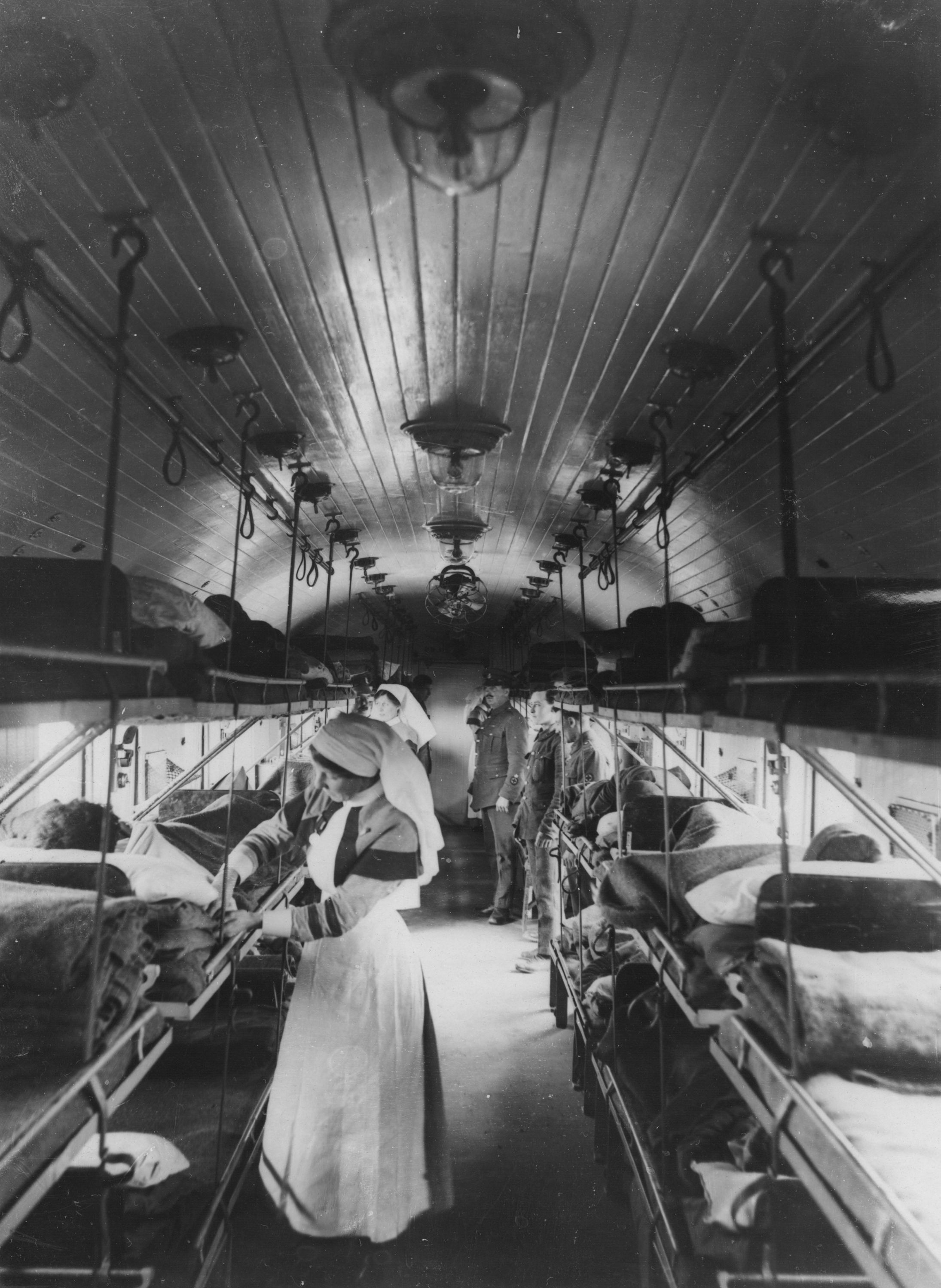
- Nurses at work in an ambulance train in France during the First World War
- Active: 1908–1921
- Country: United Kingdom
- Branch: British Army
- Role: Nurses

The Territorial Force Nursing Service (TFNS) was established in 1908, part of the reform of the British auxiliary forces introduced by Richard Haldane which created the Territorial Force. Nurses with at least three years of training were able to volunteer for the service, and facilities comprised 23 large buildings earmarked for use as hospitals in the event of war. The TFNS was augmented by the affiliation of Voluntary Aid Detachments. On the outbreak of the First World War, the hospitals were commissioned and up to 2,784 nurses mobilised to staff them. By the end of the war, up to 8,140 nurses had served with the TFNS, 2,280 of them in hospitals and casualty clearing stations abroad. After the war, the TFNS became the Territorial Army Nursing Service in line with the reconstitution of the Territorial Force as the Territorial Army.

== Formation ==
The Territorial Force Nursing Service (TFNS) was established by Richard Haldane (Secretary of State for War) as part of the Army Medical Service of the newly established Territorial Force, created by his reform of auxiliary forces in the United Kingdom (UK) The service was inaugurated in July 1908, and its first Matron-in-Chief was Sidney Browne, who had previously held this position in the Queen Alexandra’s Imperial Military Nursing Service (QAIMNS). The first national advisory council for the TFNS was composed of: Surgeon-General & Director-General of the Army Medical Service Sir Alfred Keogh (chairman); The Duchess of Montrose (vice president);Miss Haldane;Countess of Jersey; Lady Helen Munro-Ferguson; Lady Grenfell, Lady Knox and matrons - Miss Cox-Davies (Royal Free Hospital), Miss Lloyd Still (Middlesex Hospital), Miss McCall Anderson (St. George's Hospital), Miss Hamilton (St. Thomas' Hospital), Miss Ray (Kings College Hospital), Miss Hughes (General superintendent, Queen's Jubilee Institute).

The new Army Medical Service included the planning for 23 General Hospitals in the UK to receive and professionally treat wounded and ill soldiers. Twenty-three large buildings, such as schools, colleges, hotels and public buildings, were earmarked across the country for use as territorial hospitals, though they retained their civilian usage in peacetime and would only become operational in the event of war. Each of the general hospitals was required to have a matron, 30 sisters and 88 nurses. The matrons were required to were to spend 7 days training in a military hospital every second year. Many of those appointed matrons and principal matrons were leaders in the development of the nursing profession in the UK for example, according to The British Journal of Nursing Euphemia Steele Innes was the principal matron 2nd Northern General Hospital at Leeds, who was also a board member of Queen Alexandra's Army Nursing Board.

TFNS nurses had to be 23 years of age or older and must have completed at least three years of training in a recognised hospital. They received neither pay nor special training during peacetime, though matrons underwent seven days of training in a military hospital bi-annually. By March 1909, enough nurses for 15 hospitals in England and Scotland had volunteered. Opposition from the Army Nursing Board, Sydney Holland (Chairman of the London Hospital) and senior London nurses delayed the establishment of the TFNS in the capital until the middle of March. On the 15th, 400 nurses were recruited as a result of a public meeting attended by many well-known speakers, including Elizabeth Haldane (vice-chairwoman of the Territorial Nursing Council and sister of Richard), Isla Stewart (Matron at St Bartholomew's Hospital) and Sir Alfred Keogh (Director General Army Medical Services). This was enough to establish two hospitals: No.1 (City of London) General Hospital, to be staffed exclusively by nurses from St Bartholomew's Hospital; and No.2 (City of London) General Hospital, to be staffed by nurses from The London Hospital and Guy's Hospital. Also in 1909, the TFNS was augmented by the affiliation of the Red Cross-organised Voluntary Aid Detachments (VADs). By January 1911, some 3,000 nurses had enrolled in the TFNS, and the next year the VADs numbered some 26,000 members. In 1913, TFNS nurses were given permission to volunteer for overseas service.

== First World War ==
On the outbreak of the First World War in August 1914, the hospitals were commissioned and the TFNS mobilised. By the end of the month, 19 territorial hospitals were operational and between 2,117 and 2,784 TFNS nurses had been mobilised to staff them. The remaining four hospitals became operational the next month, and another two were opened in 1915 and 1917. Some territorial hospitals could be quite considerable, such as Manchester's 6,700-bed Second Western General Hospital. There were also hundreds of smaller auxiliary hospitals, used initially for surgery and later as convalescent facilities. Eighteen territorial hospitals were established overseas, and TFNS nurses also worked alongside QAIMNS nurses in military hospitals and casualty clearing stations in France, Belgium, Malta, Salonica, Gibraltar, Egypt, Mesopotamia and East Africa. In total, between 7,117 and 8,140 nurses served in the TFNS during the war, of which 2,280 served overseas. Research carried out by Yvonne McEwen showed that 61 nurses of the TFNS lost their lives in World War I. Seventeen nurses of the TFNS received military medals.

Military nurses were traditionally required to be unmarried or widowed with no dependents, but the shortage of nurses during the war meant that married women were allowed into the service and single nurses who married were allowed to remain. Following the war, most nurses returned to civilian work, and all married nurses were forced to resign from the TFNS.

== Individual nurses ==
Here are just a few examples of individual TFNS nurses:

- Miss Minnie Bailey Thompson was recorded as the first TFNS nurse to die on active service in World War 1. She became ill while on duty at the 2nd London General Hospital based at St Mark's College on Fulham Road and died later at St. Mary’s Hospital, Paddington, on 15 September 1914. She is buried in the military section of Brompton Cemetery.
- Grace Mitchell, a nurse with the TFNS, was called up shortly after the start of the war. She worked initially in the 3rd Southern General Hospital in Oxford, and in May 1917 transferred to Unit 56 General Hospital in Étaples, France. This was a Base Hospital, part of the casualty evacuation chain, located further back from the front lines than the casualty clearing stations. The hospitals were located close to the coast, with good rail access to facilitate the transport and repatriation of casualties. From September 1918, she worked at several casualty clearing stations in France, Belgium and Germany, and was demobilised in May 1920.
- Anne Elizabeth Musson joined up with TFNS and was in France for four and a half years, including being in charge of the transfer of patients in ambulance trains.
- Fanny Pease was a nurse and a militant suffragette who served in the Territorial Forces Nursing Services (TFNS) France, Egypt and in Hull UK. For her military nursing service she was awarded the Royal Red Cross medal, second class in 1919.
- Helen Gregory Smith, CBE RRC, was in the Territorial Force Nursing Service. She started as principal matron in 1908 and was then promoted to Senior Principal Matron. This role included maintaining 1,000 beds as part of the 3rd Scottish General Hospital at Stobhill and 100 beds in the Western Infirmary, both Glasgow, for wounded soldiers.
- Margaret Elwyn Sparshott was a principal matron in charge of 22 hospitals in the Manchester area, during World War I.
- Agnes Watt was appointed Principal Matron, TFNS, 3rd Southern General Hospital, Oxford in 1909 and held the post until 1922.

== After the First World War ==
In 1920, Dame Maud McCarthy became Matron-in-chief following the retirement of Dame Sidney Browne. McCarthy had previously been matron-in-chief for the British Expeditionary Force in France. In line with the reconstitution of the Territorial Force as the Territorial Army, the TFNS was renamed the Territorial Army Nursing Service (TANS) from 1 October 1921. McCarthy was succeeded by Dame Anne Beadsmore Smith as matron-in-chief of the TANS in 1925.

== Bibliography ==
- Beckett, Ian Frederick William (2011). Britain's Part-Time Soldiers: The Amateur Military Tradition: 1558–1945. Barnsley, South Yorkshire: Pen & Sword Military. ISBN 9781848843950.
- Haldane, Elizabeth (1923). The British Nurse in Peace and War. London: John Murray. OCLC 559671411.
- Hallett, Christine E. (2014). Veiled Warriors: Allied Nurses of the First World War. Oxford: Oxford University Press. ISBN 9780198703693.
- Hay, Ian (1953). One hundred Years of Army Nursing: The Story of the British Army Nursing Services from the Time of Florence Nightingale to the Present Day. London: Cassell. OCLC 877172963.
