= City of Leeds Training College =

Teacher training college in England

Coordinates: 53.827°N 1.593°W

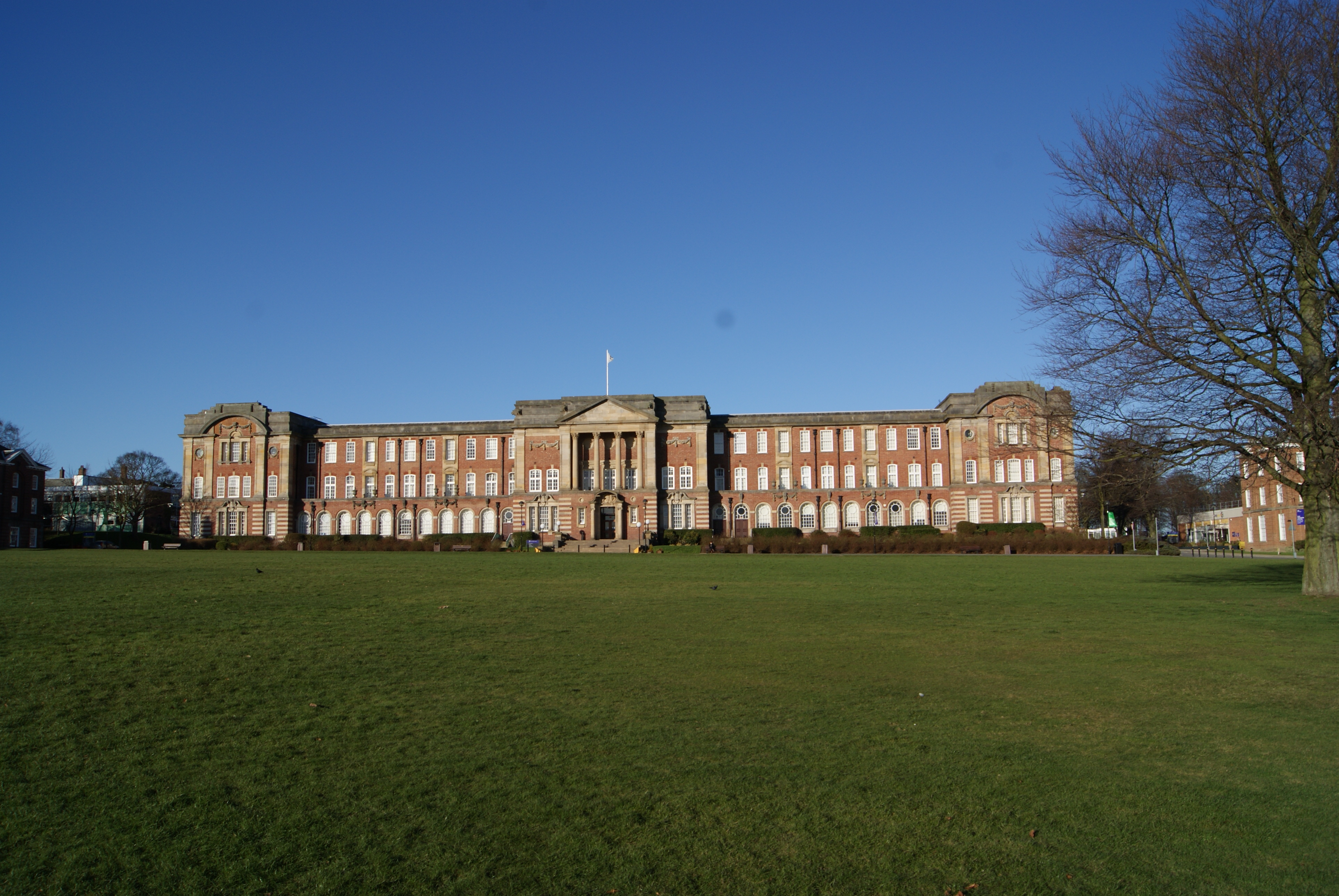
The James Graham building at Beckett Park

The City of Leeds Training College was a teacher training college established in 1907 at Beckett Park in Leeds in the West Riding of Yorkshire, England. After merging with the Carnegie College of Physical Education in 1968 it was renamed the City of Leeds and Carnegie College. It became one of the principal constituent institutions of Leeds Beckett University.

== History ==
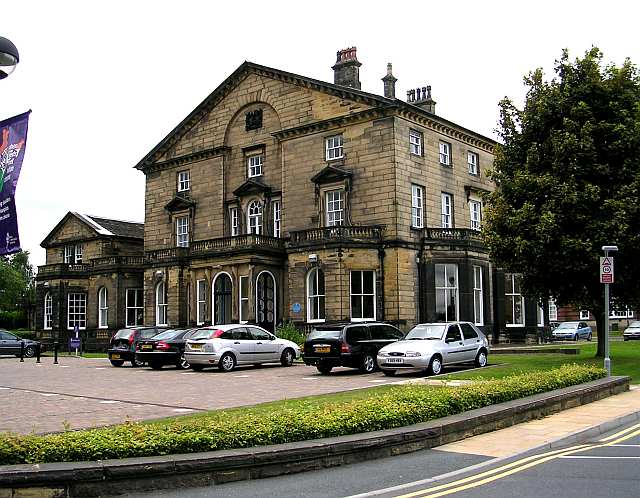
The Grange at Beckett Park

The City of Leeds Training College grew out of the Leeds Pupil Teacher College founded in 1901 to train teachers centrally in the city rather than in individual schools. The college in the city centre was founded in 1907 and moved to Beckett Park in 1912. The site selected was a 35-acre site around Kirkstall Grange. The mansion house was already rented by Leeds Council to house teacher training students. After some opposition, the property was bought for £48,000 from Lord Grimthorpe. A competition for Leeds architects to design a main building and seven halls of residence or hostels, two for men and five for women, resulted in 27 submissions. Building started in 1911 and the college was ready for occupation by September 1912. The mansion was used as a men's hostel named Grange. The other hostels were named after prominent Yorkshire people, Cavendish, Fairfax, Brontë, Caedmon, Macaulay, Leighton and Priestley. The college had accommodation for 300 women students and 180 men in eight hostels each housing 60 students. By September 1913 the college was filled to capacity with students from all over England.

At the outbreak of First World War the college was about to admit 421 students when the building was requisitioned by the War Office to create the 2nd Northern General Hospital, a facility for the Royal Army Medical Corps to treat military casualties. During the First World War the principal matron of the 2nd Northern General Hospital based at Beckett Park, Leeds, was Euphemia Steele Innes.

Local schools were used for teaching and several large houses in Headingley were used to house students. In 1916 the War Office took over the whole college for the hospital which remained open until 1924. The college trained men and women but was not co-educational as men and women were taught separately. Out of 170 teacher training colleges it was one of only five that was mixed.

From 1918 to 1933, the principal of the college was the mathematician John Robinson Airey.

The Carnegie College of Physical Education was formed in 1933 as the result of an initiative between the government and the Carnegie Trust to provide training for male physical education teachers. The Director of Education for Leeds, James Graham, was instrumental in attracting the college to Leeds and building its premises on the Beckett Park campus. The Carnegie Trust provided £30,000 to provide a gymnasium and a hostel for 60 male students.

The college premises were again used as a military hospital in the Second World War and the students were moved out of the city to Scarborough, returning to Beckett Park at the end of 1945.

=== Name changes ===
The City of Leeds College changed its name to the City of Leeds College of Education in 1964. It merged with the physical education college in 1968 to form the City of Leeds and Carnegie College and in 1976 merged into Leeds Polytechnic which in 1992 became Leeds Metropolitan University. Leeds Metropolitan University was renamed Leeds Beckett University in September 2014. Its chancellor, Sir Bob Murray, said "We will be very proud to adopt a new name for our University which is so closely linked to the location and birthplace of two of our major founding colleges."

== Architecture ==
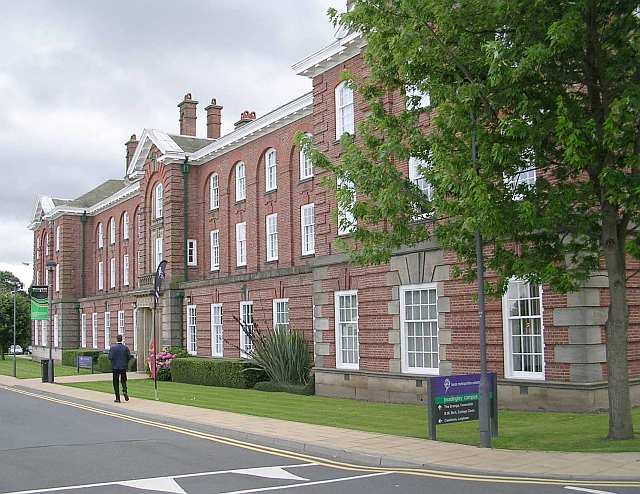
Cavendish Hall at Beckett Park

The college's original three-storey halls of residence and teaching and administration building built around a green lawn known as the Acre were designed by G. W. Atkinson and completed in 1912 in a Wrenaissance style in red brick with ashlar gritstone dressings. All are now Grade II listed buildings.

=== The Grange ===
The Grade II* listed Kirkstall Grange was built as a country house for Walter Wade in 1752 by James Paine. The house was altered around 1834 when it was acquired by the Beckett family and again in 1858.
