= Beckett Park =

Residential area and a large public park in Leeds, West Yorkshire, England

Coordinates: 53.8229°N 1.5916°W

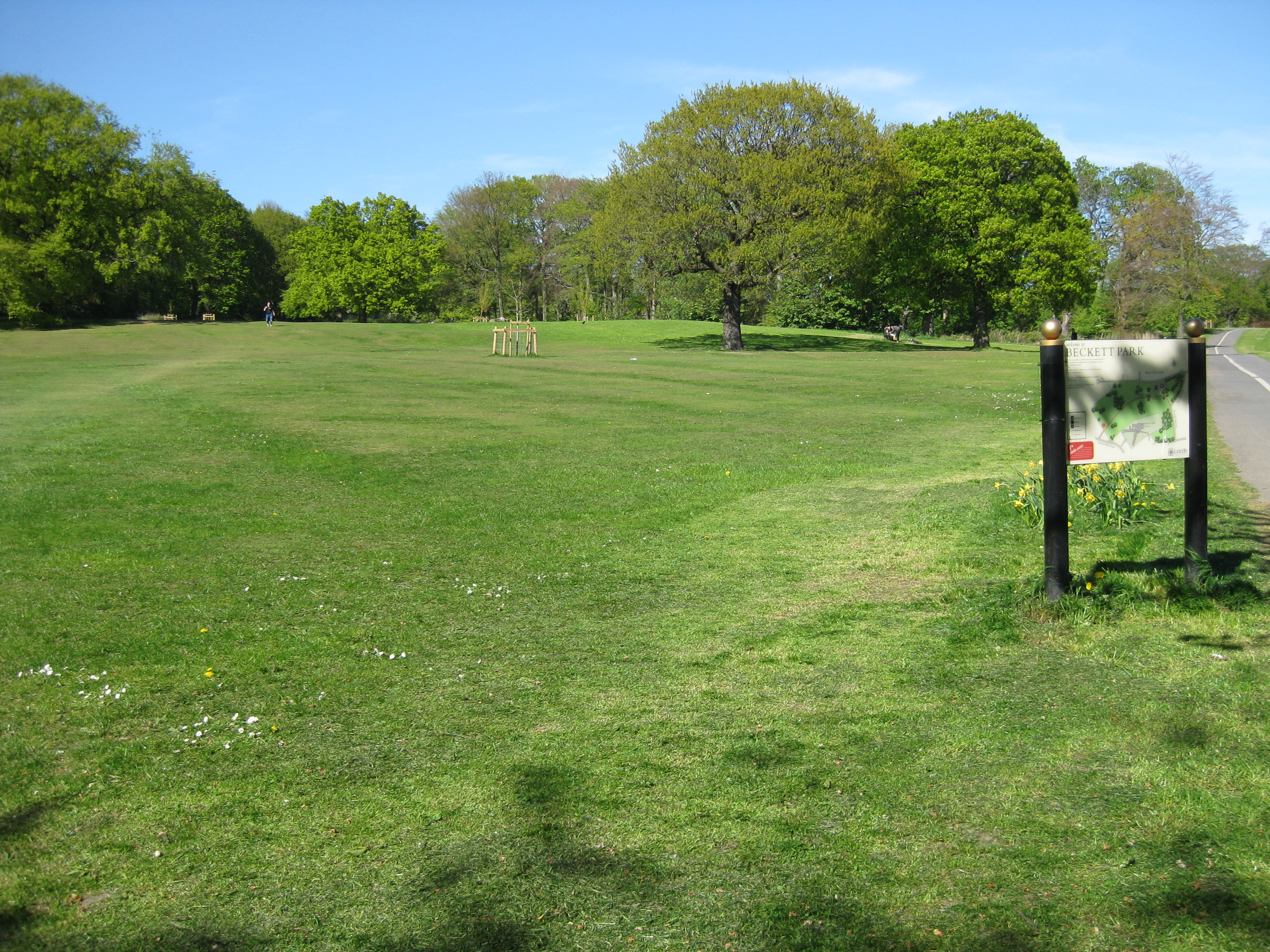
- Beckett Park

- Location within West Yorkshire
- Metropolitan borough: City of Leeds
- Metropolitan county: West Yorkshire
- Region: Yorkshire and the Humber
- Country: England
- Sovereign state: United Kingdom
- Post town: LEEDS
- Postcode district: LS6
- Dialling code: 0113
- Police: West Yorkshire
- Fire: West Yorkshire
- Ambulance: Yorkshire
- UK Parliament: Leeds North West

Beckett Park (also known as Becketts Park) is a residential area and a large public park in Leeds, West Yorkshire, England. It is in the Weetwood ward of Leeds City Council. It borders onto Headingley, West Park and Kirkstall. It is named after Ernest Beckett, 2nd Baron Grimthorpe.

== General description ==
The public park stretches from Queenswood Drive to the West and Batcliffe Mount to the East. St Chads Drive to the North and Langdale Terrace to the South. It also encompasses the Beckett Park School, a children's play park, a skate park and tennis courts. Due to the sports facilities, the park is popular with local students, a large population of whom live in the surrounding area of Headingley during term-time. Located in the wood near to the campus is a monument to Queen Victoria's visit to the Leeds Town Hall in the year 1858.

There are also local shops, a post office, a hair salon and a pizza takeaway in this area. Among other attractions to this area there are extensive woodlands and nature trails, with great views of nearby areas of Leeds.

== History ==
The land originally belonged to Kirkstall Abbey but with the Dissolution of the Monasteries it was leased from The Crown to a series of private individuals who made homes there. It included a grange called Newgrange. In 1752 this was replaced by a new building. In 1832 the New Grange estate, comprising the house and park was bought by William Beckett, who carried out major alterations and changed the name to Kirkstall Grange. The arch dedicated to Queen Victoria echoes features of William's house as well as the town hall. Beckett may have reworked an earlier arch made in 1766.

A later family member Ernest Beckett sold the estate (then called Beckett's Park) for £48,000 to Leeds Corporation in 1908, who wished to establish a training college and public park. The flat area at the top of the hill including the Grange was retained for the college, and the sloping area to the south was acquired by Wade's Charity in 1909 and leased to the Corporation in 1911 for the creation of a public park. The park is still leased from the charity, and run by the council parks department.

The City of Leeds Training College moved to newly constructed buildings and the remaining West Wing of Kirkstall Grange in Beckett's Park in 1912. During the First World War these were used as a hospital, and were only returned to the college in 1924. The buildings were also requisitioned as a hospital in the Second World War. In 1970 the college became part of Leeds Polytechnic which became Leeds Metropolitan University in 1993.

Leeds Metropolitan University was renamed Leeds Beckett University from September 2014: the Chancellor, Sir Bob Murray, said "We will be very proud to adopt a new name for our University which is so closely linked to the location and birthplace of two of our major founding colleges." This renaming was widely publicised by the University, including much new and altered signage in the city centre and Headingley, in addition to the giving away of free hoodies, all of which referenced the term 'Beckett' - much broadening knowledge of the park.

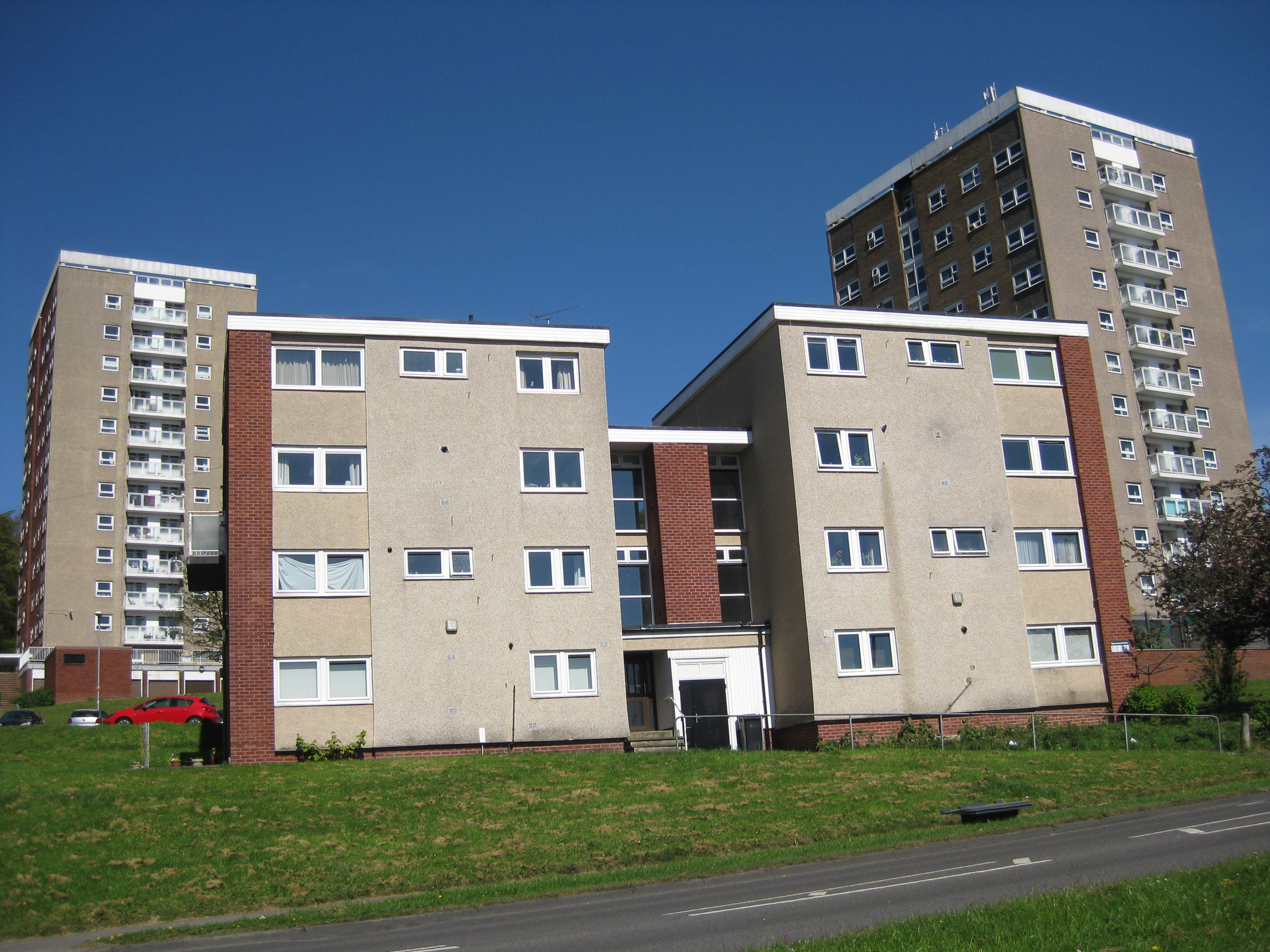
Queenswood Drive flats

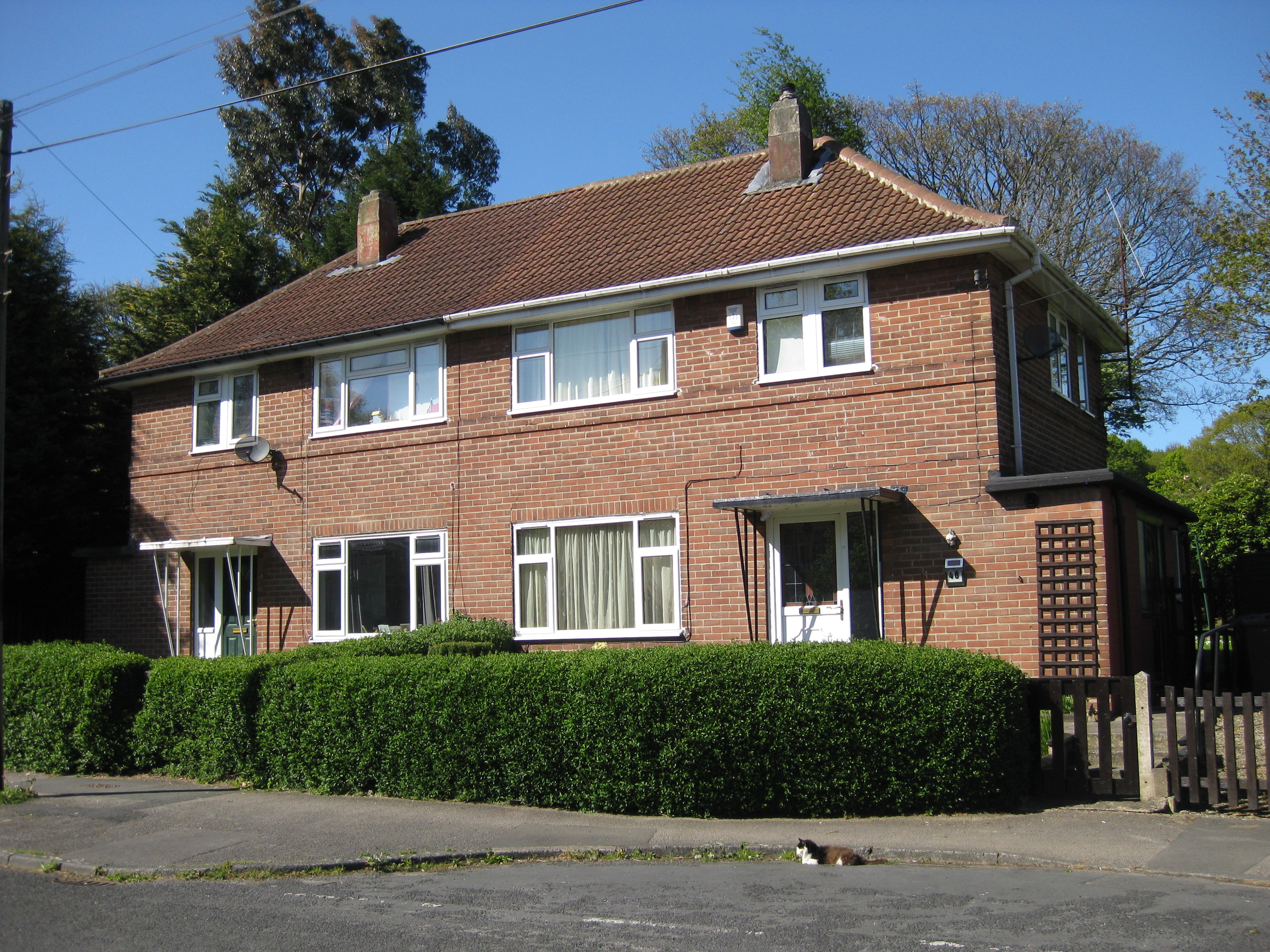
Semi-detached houses, Queenswood Road

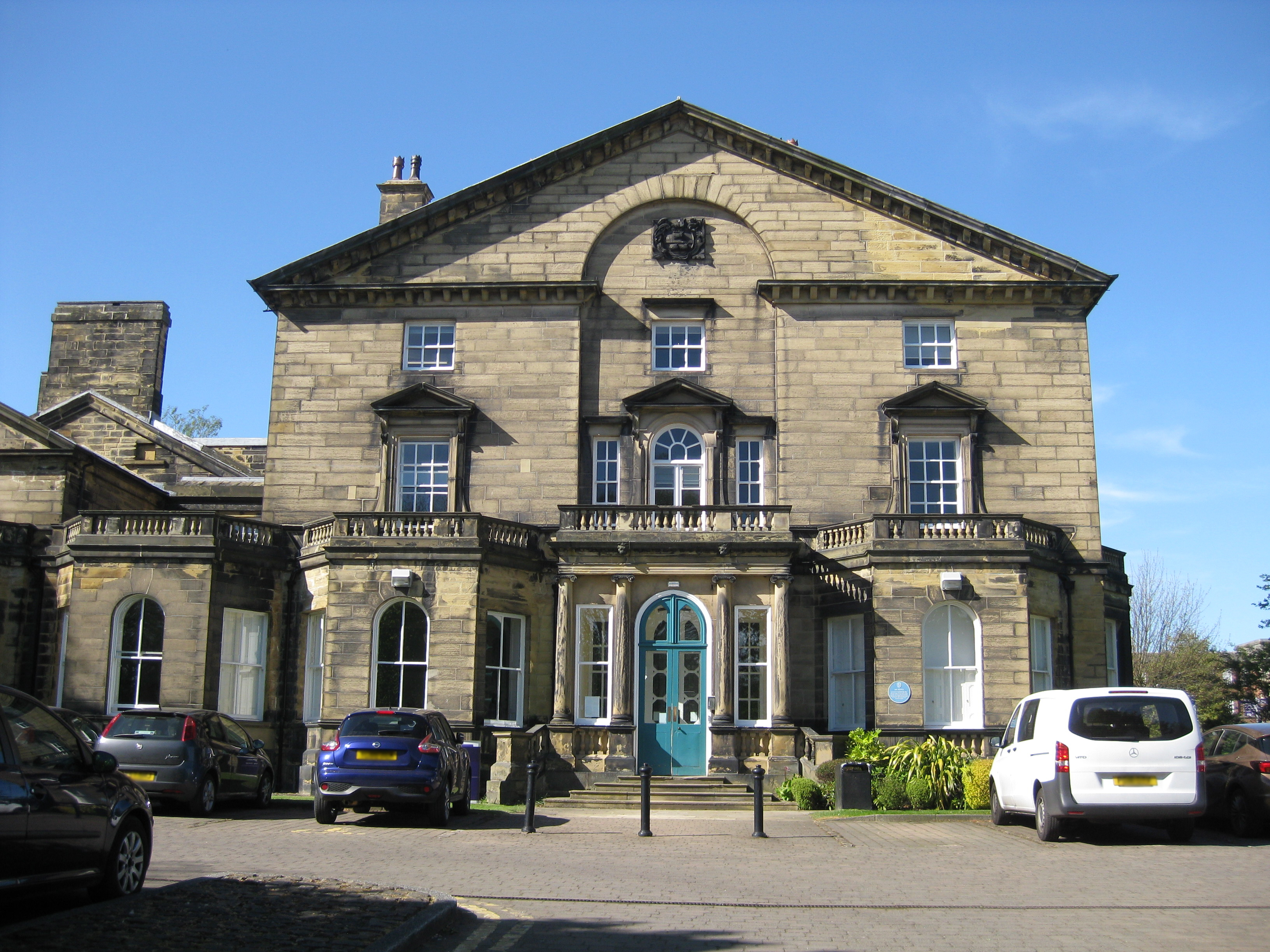
The Grange, Leeds Beckett University

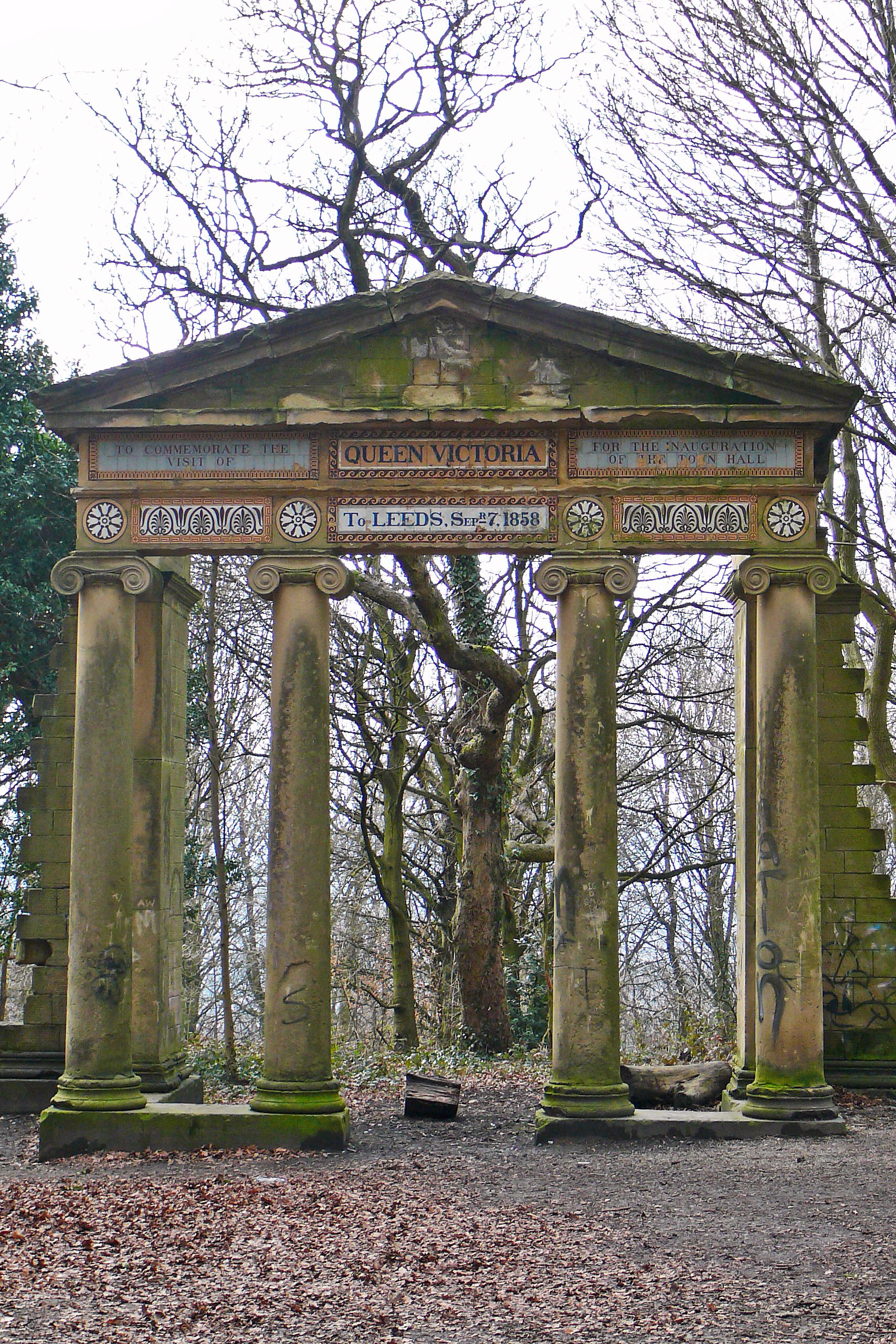
Victoria Arch

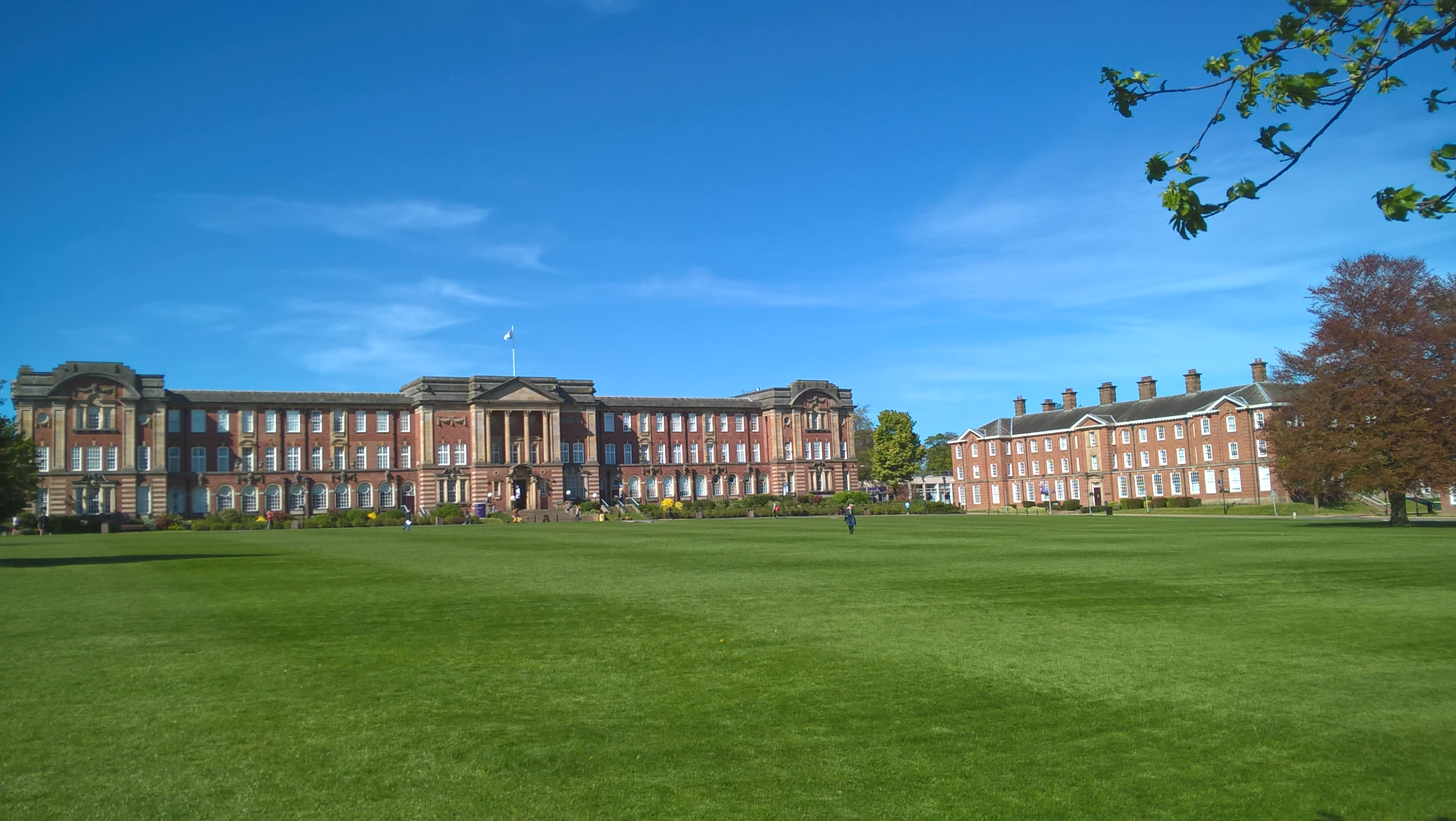
Former Training College, Leeds Beckett University
