= Richland Creek =

Richland Creek may refer to the following places, all in the United States:

== Missouri ==
- Richland Creek (Big Creek), a stream in Iron County
- Richland Creek (Crows Fork Creek), a stream in Callaway County
- Richland Creek (Missouri River), a stream in Howard County

== North Carolina ==
- Richland Creek (Deep River tributary, Guilford), a stream in Guilford County
- Richland Creek (Reedy Fork tributary), a stream in Guilford County
- Richland Creek (South Hyco Creek tributary), a stream in Person County
- Richland Creek (Deep River tributary, Randolph), a stream in Randolph County
- Richland Creek (Crabtree Creek tributary), a stream in Wake County

== Tennessee ==
- Richland Creek (Tennessee), a tributary of the Elk River
- Richland Creek (Nashville, Tennessee), a tributary of the Cumberland River in West Nashville

== Other states ==
- Richland Creek (Arkansas), a National Wild and Scenic River
- Richland Creek (Oconee River tributary), a stream in Georgia
- Richland Creek (Illinois), a protected area of Illinois
- Richland Creek (Indiana), in Greene County, Indiana
- Richland Creek (Kansas)
- Richland Creek (Texas)
- Richland Creek Wildlife Management Area
