= Katie Branch (Reedy Fork tributary) =

Stream in North Carolina, USA

Katie Branch Tributary to Reedy Fork
- Location of Katie Branch mouth Katie Branch (Reedy Fork tributary) (the United States)

Location
- Country: United States
- State: North Carolina
- County: Guilford

Physical characteristics
- Source: divide between Katie Branch and Rocky Branch
  - location: about 2 miles southeast of Monticello, North Carolina
  - coordinates: 36°12′20″N 079°38′23″W
  - elevation: 780 ft (240 m)
- Mouth: Reedy Fork
  - location: about 5 miles southeast of Monticello, North Carolina
  - coordinates: 36°10′35″N 079°37′55″W
  - elevation: 640 ft (200 m)
- Length: 2.13 mi (3.43 km)
- Basin size: 1.59 square miles (4.1 km^{2})
- Discharge
  - location: Reedy Fork
  - average: 1.95 cu ft/s (0.055 m^{3}/s) at mouth with Reedy Fork

Basin features
- Progression: Reedy Fork → Haw River → Cape Fear River → Atlantic Ocean
- River system: Haw River
- Tributaries
  - left: unnamed tributaries
  - right: unnamed tributaries
- Bridges: Turner Smith Road

Katie Branch is a 2.13 mi (3.43 km) long 1st order tributary to Reedy Fork in Guilford County, North Carolina.

== Course ==
Katie Branch rises on the Rocky Branch divide about 2 mile southeast of Monticello, North Carolina in Guilford County. Katie Branch then flows south to meet Reedy Fork about 5 miles southeast of Monticello.

== Watershed ==
Katie Branch drains 1.59 square miles (4.1 km^{2}) of area, receives about 46.0 in/year of precipitation, has a topographic wetness index of 419.08 and is about 41% forested.
