= Reedy Fork (Haw River tributary) =

Stream in North Carolina, USA

Reedy Fork Tributary to Haw River
- Location of Reedy Fork mouth Reedy Fork (Haw River tributary) (the United States)

Location
- Country: United States
- State: North Carolina
- County: Alamance; Guilford; Forsyth
- City: Kernersville

Physical characteristics
- Source: divide between Reedy Fork and Kerners Mill Creek
  - location: Kernersville, North Carolina
  - coordinates: 36°07′19″N 080°04′07″W
  - elevation: 955 ft (291 m)
- Mouth: Haw River
  - location: about 0.5 miles east of Ossipee, North Carolina
  - coordinates: 36°10′08″N 079°30′00″W
  - elevation: 578 ft (176 m)
- Length: 43.30 mi (69.68 km)
- Basin size: 255.27 square miles (661.1 km^{2})
- Discharge
  - location: Haw River
  - average: 255.75 cu ft/s (7.242 m^{3}/s) at mouth with Haw River

Basin features
- Progression: Haw River → Cape Fear River → Atlantic Ocean
- River system: Haw River
- Tributaries
  - left: Beaver Creek; Long Branch; Squirrel Creek; Smith Branch; Rocky Branch; Katie Branch
  - right: Moores Creek; Brush Creek; Horsepen Creek; Richland Creek; Buffalo Creek
- Waterbodies: Lake Brandt; Lake Townsend; Hardys Mill Pond
- Bridges: Gralin Road, Pleasant View Trail, Cross Creek Road, North Bunker Hill Road, NC 68, Alcorn Road, Bunch Road, I-73, Bunch Road, US 220, BUr-Mill Club Road, Lake Brandt Road, North Church Street, Yanceyville Road, Lake Townsend Road, US 29, Reedy Fork Parkway, McLeansville Road, Friendship Church Road, High Rock Road, NC 61, Old NC 87, NC 87

Reedy Fork is a 43.70 mi (70.33 km) long 3rd order tributary to the Haw River, in Alamance County, North Carolina.

== Variant names ==
According to the Geographic Names Information System, it has also been known historically as:

- Reedy Fork Creek

== Course ==
Reedy Fork rises in Forsyth County on the divide between Reedy Fork and Kerners Mill Creek. Reedy Fork then flows east into and through Guilford County to meet the Haw River in Alamance County about 0.5 miles east of Ossipee.

== Tributaries ==
Tributaries of Reedy Fork (Haw River tributary)

Name, Bank	Watershed Area in Square Miles (km^{2})	Average Discharge	Stream Length	Mouth Coordinates	Mouth Elevation	Source Coordinates	Source Elevation	Remarks
Buffalo Creek, right bank	100.58 square miles (260.5 km^{2})	137.07 cu ft/s (3.881 m^{3}/s)	8.31 mi (13.37 km)	36°10′27″N 079°36′05″W	618 ft (188 m)	36°07′40″N 079°39′44″W	660 ft (200 m)	Buffalo Creek, a 4th order tributary, begins at the confluence of North and South Buffalo Creeks about 2 miles north of McLeansville, North Carolina. The creek then flows north east to meet Reedy Fork about 6 miles south of Osceola, North Carolina. Buffalo Creek contributes 53.6% of the average water discharge for Reedy Fork.
Katie Branch, left bank	1.53 square miles (4.0 km^{2})	1.95 cu ft/s (0.055 m^{3}/s)	2.13 mi (3.43 km)	36°10′35″N 079°37′55″W	640 ft (200 m)	36°12′20″N 079°38′23″W	780 ft (240 m)	Katie Branch, a 1st order tributary, rises about 2 miles east of Monticello, North Carolina on the Rocky Branch divide. The branch then flows south to meet Reedy Fork about 5 miles south of Monticello. Katie Branch is the smallest named tributary on Reedy Fork by discharge and length.
Rocky Branch, left bank	2.32 square miles (6.0 km^{2})	2.91 cu ft/s (0.082 m^{3}/s)	2.45 mi (3.94 km)	36°10′48″N 079°38′55″W	650 ft (200 m)	36°12′56″N 079°39′14″W	805 ft (245 m)	Rocky Branch, a 1st order tributary, rises about 1 mile east of Monticello, North Carolina on the Candy Creek divide. The branch then flows south to meet Reedy Fork about 4 miles southeast of Monticello.
Smith Branch, left bank	2.75 square miles (7.1 km^{2})	3.44 cu ft/s (0.097 m^{3}/s)	2.62 mi (4.22 km)	36°10′55″N 079°40′22″W	662 ft (202 m)	36°12′54″N 079°39′51″W	820 ft (250 m)	Smith Branch, a 2nd order tributary, rises about 0.25 miles southeast of Monticello, North Carolina on the Benaja Creek divide. The branch then flows south to meet Reedy Fork about 5 miles south of Monticello.
Squirrel Creek, left bank	5.70 square miles (14.8 km^{2})	6.81 cu ft/s (0.193 m^{3}/s)	4.42 mi (7.11 km)	36°11′22″N 079°44′45″W	717 ft (219 m)	36°12′40″N 079°48′02″W	814 ft (248 m)	Squirrel Creek, a 2nd order tributary, rises about 5 miles west of Browns Summit, North Carolina on the Mears Fork divide. The creek then flows south then east to meet Reedy Fork within Lake Townsend.
Richland Creek, right bank	8.27 square miles (21.4 km^{2})	9.47 cu ft/s (0.268 m^{3}/s)	5.29 mi (8.51 km)	36°09′59″N 079°46′59″W	717 ft (219 m)	36°07′13″N 079°50′02″W	850 ft (260 m)	Richland Creek, a 3rd order tributary, rises at Jaycee Park in Greensboro, North Carolina on the Buffalo Creek divide. The creek then flows north then northeast through Richland Lake to meet Reedy Fork within Lake Townsend.
Long Branch, left bank	4.30 square miles (11.1 km^{2})	5.14 cu ft/s (0.146 m^{3}/s)	2.80 mi (4.51 km)	36°10′36″N 079°47′40″W	717 ft (219 m)	36°12′20″N 079°49′54″W	830 ft (250 m)	Long Branch, a 2nd order tributary, rises in Hillsdale, North Carolina on the Mears Fork divide. The branch then flows southeast to meet Reedy Fork within Lake Townsend.
Horsepen Creek, right bank	20.13 square miles (52.1 km^{2})	21.67 cu ft/s (0.614 m^{3}/s)	8.87 mi (14.27 km)	36°10′13″N 079°50′24″W	743 ft (226 m)	36°04′53″N 079°55′44″W	865 ft (264 m)	Horsepen Creek, a 3rd order tributary, rises at the Piedmont Triad International Airport on the East Fork Deep River divide. The creek then flows northeast to meet Reedy Fork within Lake Brandt.
Brush Creek, right bank	11.74 square miles (30.4 km^{2})	12.82 cu ft/s (0.363 m^{3}/s)	8.15 mi (13.12 km)	36°10′18″N 079°52′38″W	743 ft (226 m)	36°07′17″N 079°57′46″W	910 ft (280 m)	Brush Creek, a 2nd order tributary, rises about 0.5 miles northwest of Piedmont Triad International Airport on the Deep River divide. The creek then flows northeast through Lake Higgins to meet Reedy Fork within Lake Brandt.
Moores Creek, right bank	4.61 square miles (11.9 km^{2})	5.26 cu ft/s (0.149 m^{3}/s)	5.12 mi (8.24 km)	36°10′44″N 079°54′16″W	751 ft (229 m)	36°07′48″N 079°57′37″W	915 ft (279 m)	Moores Creek, 1st order tributary, rises in a pond about 1 mile north of Piedmont Triad International Airport on the Brush Creek divide. The creek then flows northeast meet Reedy Fork about 1.5 miles south of Summerfield, North Carolina.
Beaver Creek, left bank	6.74 square miles (17.5 km^{2})	7.78 cu ft/s (0.220 m^{3}/s)	6.16 mi (9.91 km)	36°10′08″N 079°57′25″W	781 ft (238 m)	36°08′14″N 080°02′53″W	978 ft (298 m)	Beaver Creek, a 2nd order tributary, rises about 0.25 miles northeast of Kernersville, North Carolina in Forsyth County on the East Belews Creek divide. Beaver Creek then flows northeast to meet Reedy Fork about 3 miles east-northeast of Oak Ridge, North Carolina.

== Watershed ==
Reedy Fork drains 255.27 square miles (661.1 km^{2}) of area, receives about 45.5 in/year of precipitation, and has a wetness index of 429.86 and is about 31% forested.

== See also ==
- List of rivers of North Carolina
