= Squirrel Creek (Reedy Fork tributary) =

Stream in North Carolina, USA

Squirrel Creek Tributary to Reedy Fork
- Location of Squirrel Creek mouth Squirrel Creek (Reedy Fork tributary) (the United States)

Location
- Country: United States
- State: North Carolina
- County: Guilford

Physical characteristics
- Source: divide between Squirrel Creek and Mears Fork
  - location: about 5 miles west of Browns Summit, North Carolina
  - coordinates: 36°12′40″N 079°48′02″W
  - elevation: 814 ft (248 m)
- Mouth: Reedy Fork
  - location: Lake Townsend
  - coordinates: 36°12′40″N 079°48′02″W
  - elevation: 717 ft (219 m)
- Length: 4.42 mi (7.11 km)
- Basin size: 5.70 square miles (14.8 km^{2})
- Discharge
  - location: Reedy Fork
  - average: 6.81 cu ft/s (0.193 m^{3}/s) at mouth with Reedy Fork

Basin features
- Progression: Reedy Fork → Haw River → Cape Fear River → Atlantic Ocean
- River system: Haw River
- Tributaries
  - left: unnamed tributaries
  - right: unnamed tributaries
- Waterbodies: Lake Townsend
- Bridges: N Church Street, Yanceyville Road, Doggett Road

Squirrel Creek is a 4.42 mi (7.11 km) long 2nd order tributary to Reedy Fork in Guilford County, North Carolina.

== Course ==
Squirrel Creek rises on the Mears Fork divide about 5 miles west of Browns Summit, North Carolina in Guilford County. Squirrel Creek then flows south and then turns east to drain into Lake Townsend, where it meets Reedy Fork.

== Watershed ==
Squirrel Creek drains 5.70 square miles (14.8 km^{2}) of area, receives about 45.7 in/year of precipitation, has a topographic wetness index of 432.80 and is about 49% forested.
