= Smith Branch (Reedy Fork tributary) =

Stream in North Carolina, USA

Smith Branch Tributary to Reedy Fork
- Location of Smith Branch mouth Smith Branch (Reedy Fork tributary) (the United States)

Location
- Country: United States
- State: North Carolina
- County: Guilford

Physical characteristics
- Source: divide between Smith Branch and Benaja Creek
  - location: about 0.25 miles southeast of Monticello, North Carolina
  - coordinates: 36°12′54″N 079°39′51″W
  - elevation: 820 ft (250 m)
- Mouth: Reedy Fork
  - location: about 2 miles south of Monticello, North Carolina
  - coordinates: 36°10′55″N 079°40′22″W
  - elevation: 662 ft (202 m)
- Length: 2.02 mi (3.25 km)
- Basin size: 2.75 square miles (7.1 km^{2})
- Discharge
  - location: Reedy Fork
  - average: 3.44 cu ft/s (0.097 m^{3}/s) at mouth with Reedy Fork

Basin features
- Progression: Reedy Fork → Haw River → Cape Fear River → Atlantic Ocean
- River system: Haw River
- Tributaries
  - left: unnamed tributaries
  - right: unnamed tributaries
- Bridges: Turner Smith Road

Smith Branch is a 2.02 mi (3.25 km) long 2nd order tributary to Reedy Fork in Guilford County, North Carolina.

== Course ==
Smith Branch rises on the Benaja Creek divide about 0.25 miles southeast of Monticello, North Carolina in Guilford County. Smith Branch then flows south to meet Reedy Fork about 2 miles south of Monticello.

== Watershed ==
Smith Branch drains 2.75 square miles (7.1 km^{2}) of area, receives about 46.0 in/year of precipitation, has a topographic wetness index of 414.95 and is about 42% forested.
