= Long Branch (Reedy Fork tributary) =

Stream in North Carolina, USA

Long Branch Tributary to Reedy Fork
- Location of Long Branch mouth Long Branch (Reedy Fork tributary) (the United States)

Location
- Country: United States
- State: North Carolina
- County: Guilford

Physical characteristics
- Source: divide between Long Branch and Mears Fork
  - location: Hillsdale, North Carolina
  - coordinates: 36°12′20″N 079°49′54″W
  - elevation: 830 ft (250 m)
- Mouth: Reedy Fork
  - location: Lake Townsend
  - coordinates: 36°10′36″N 079°47′40″W
  - elevation: 717 ft (219 m)
- Length: 2.80 mi (4.51 km)
- Basin size: 4.30 square miles (11.1 km^{2})
- Discharge
  - location: Reedy Fork
  - average: 5.14 cu ft/s (0.146 m^{3}/s) at mouth with Reedy Fork

Basin features
- Progression: Reedy Fork → Haw River → Cape Fear River → Atlantic Ocean
- River system: Haw River
- Tributaries
  - left: unnamed tributaries
  - right: unnamed tributaries
- Waterbodies: Lake Townsend

Long Branch is a 2.80 mi (4.51 km) long 2nd order tributary to Reedy Fork in Guilford County, North Carolina.

== Course ==
Long Branch rises on the Mears Fork divide at Hillsdale, North Carolina in Guilford County. Long Branch then flows southeast to meet Reedy Fork in Lake Townsend.

== Watershed ==
Long Branch drains 4.30 square miles (11.1 km^{2}) of area, receives about 45.6 in/year of precipitation, has a topographic wetness index of 409.99 and is about 53% forested.
