= East Fork Deep River =

Stream in North Carolina, USA

East Fork Deep River Tributary to Deep River
- Location of East Fork Deep River mouth East Fork Deep River (the United States)

Location
- Country: United States
- State: North Carolina
- County: Guilford

Physical characteristics
- Source: Reedy Fork divide
  - location: about 3 miles northwest of Greensboro, North Carolina
  - coordinates: 36°05′54″N 079°59′42″W
  - elevation: 935 ft (285 m)
- Mouth: West Fork Deep River
  - location: High Point Lake
  - coordinates: 36°01′13″N 079°56′24″W
  - elevation: 757 ft (231 m)
- Length: 9.25 mi (14.89 km)
- Basin size: 21.67 square miles (56.1 km^{2})
- Discharge
  - location: Deep River
  - average: 28.30 cu ft/s (0.801 m^{3}/s) at mouth with West Fork Deep River

Basin features
- Progression: Rocky River → Deep River → Cape Fear River → Atlantic Ocean
- River system: Deep River
- Population: generally south
- Tributaries
  - left: Long Branch
  - right: unnamed tributaries
- Bridges: Triad Drive, Industrial Village Road, Lynwood Smith Expressway (NC 68), Gallimore Dairy Road, Regency Drive, Piedmont Parkway, W Wendover Avenue

East Fork Deep River is a 9.25 mi (14.89 km) long 3rd order tributary to the Deep River in Guilford County, North Carolina. This stream along the West Fork Deep River forms the Deep River.

== Course ==
East Fork Deep River rises about three miles (4.8 km) northwest of Greensboro, North Carolina in Guilford County and then flows south to join West Fork Deep River forming the Deep River within High Point Lake.

== Watershed ==
East Fork Deep River drains 21.67 square miles (56.1 km^{2}) of area, receives about 45.1 in/year of precipitation, and has a wetness index of 444.10 and is about 18% forested.

== See also ==
- List of rivers of North Carolina
