= Rocky Branch (Reedy Fork tributary) =

Stream in North Carolina, USA

Rocky Branch Tributary to Reedy Fork
- Location of Rocky Branch mouth Rocky Branch (Reedy Fork tributary) (the United States)

Location
- Country: United States
- State: North Carolina
- County: Guilford

Physical characteristics
- Source: divide between Rocky Branch and Candy Creek
  - location: about 1 mile east of Monticello, North Carolina
  - coordinates: 36°12′56″N 079°39′14″W
  - elevation: 805 ft (245 m)
- Mouth: Reedy Fork
  - location: about 4 southeast of Monticello, North Carolina
  - coordinates: 36°10′48″N 079°38′55″W
  - elevation: 650 ft (200 m)
- Length: 2.49 mi (4.01 km)
- Basin size: 2.32 square miles (6.0 km^{2})
- Discharge
  - location: Reedy Fork
  - average: 2.91 cu ft/s (0.082 m^{3}/s) at mouth with Reedy Fork

Basin features
- Progression: Reedy Fork → Haw River → Cape Fear River → Atlantic Ocean
- River system: Haw River
- Tributaries
  - left: unnamed tributaries
  - right: unnamed tributaries
- Bridges: Turner Smith Road

Rocky Branch is a 2.49 mi (4.01 km) long 1st order tributary to Reedy Fork in Guilford County, North Carolina.

== Course ==
Rocky Branch rises on the Candy Creek divide about 1 mile southeast of Monticello, North Carolina in Guilford County. Rocky Branch then flows south to meet Reedy Fork about 4 miles southeast of Monticello.

== Watershed ==
Rocky Branch drains 2.32 square miles (6.0 km^{2}) of area, receives about 46.0 in/year of precipitation, has a topographic wetness index of 404.65 and is about 51% forested.
