= Candy Creek =

Candy Creek may refer to:

== Streams ==
- Candy Creek (St. Francis County, Arkansas), a tributary to Caney Creek
- Candy Creek (Amite County, Mississippi), a tributary to Cotton Creek
- Candy Creek (Buchanan County, Missouri), a tributary to the Platte River
- Candy Creek (Haw River tributary) (Rockingham County, North Carolina), a tributary to the Haw River
- Candy Creek (Osage County, Oklahoma), a tributary to Bird Creek
- Candy Creek (Sullivan County, Tennessee), a tributary to South Fork Holston River via Boone Lake
- Candy Creek (Chelan County, Washington), a tributary to Entiat River
