= West Fork Deep River =

Stream in North Carolina, USA

West Fork Deep River Tributary to Deep River
- Location of West Fork Deep River mouth West Fork Deep River (the United States)

Location
- Country: United States
- State: North Carolina
- County: Guilford; Forsyth

Physical characteristics
- Source: Reedy Fork divide
  - location: Kernersville, North Carolina
  - coordinates: 36°06′42″N 080°03′42″W
  - elevation: 950 ft (290 m)
- Mouth: East Fork Deep River
  - location: High Point Lake
  - coordinates: 35°59′51″N 079°57′36″W
  - elevation: 757 ft (231 m)
- Length: 12.76 mi (20.54 km)
- Basin size: 39.71 square miles (102.8 km^{2})
- Discharge
  - location: Deep River
  - average: 42.73 cu ft/s (1.210 m^{3}/s) at mouth with East Fork Deep River

Basin features
- Progression: Deep River → Cape Fear River → Atlantic Ocean
- River system: Deep River
- Tributaries
  - left: unnamed tributaries
  - right: Hiatt Branch; Boulding Branch
- Bridges: Industrial Park Drive, Kernersville Medical Parkway, I-40, Twin Creek Road, S Bunker Hill Road, Sandy Ridge Road, Johnson Street, Skeet Club Road, NC 68, Deep River Road, Penny Road

West Fork Deep River is a 12.76 mi (20.54 km) long 3rd order tributary to the Deep River in Guilford County, North Carolina. This stream along the East Fork Deep River forms the Deep River.

== Course ==
West Fork Deep River rises in Kernersville, North Carolina in Forsyth County and then flows southeast into Guilford County to join East Fork Deep River forming the Deep River within High Point Lake.

== Watershed ==
West Fork Deep River drains 39.71 square miles (102.8 km^{2}) of area, receives about 45.5 in/year of precipitation, and has a wetness index of 433.75 and is about 22% forested.
