= Beaver Creek (Reedy Fork tributary) =

Stream in North Carolina, USA

Beaver Creek Tributary to Reedy Fork
- Location of Beaver Creek mouth Beaver Creek (Reedy Fork tributary) (the United States)

Location
- Country: United States
- State: North Carolina
- County: Guilford; Forsyth
- City: Kernersville

Physical characteristics
- Source: divide between Beaver Creek, East Belews Creek, and Haw River
  - location: about 0.25 miles northeast of Kernersville, North Carolina
  - coordinates: 36°08′14″N 080°02′53″W
  - elevation: 978 ft (298 m)
- Mouth: Reedy Fork
  - location: about 3 miles east-southeast of Oak Ridge, North Carolina
  - coordinates: 36°10′08″N 079°57′29″W
  - elevation: 781 ft (238 m)
- Length: 6.16 mi (9.91 km)
- Basin size: 6.74 square miles (17.5 km^{2})
- Discharge
  - location: Reedy Fork
  - average: 7.78 cu ft/s (0.220 m^{3}/s) at mouth with Reedy Fork

Basin features
- Progression: Reedy Fork → Haw River → Cape Fear River → Atlantic Ocean
- River system: Haw River
- Tributaries
  - left: unnamed tributaries
  - right: unnamed tributaries
- Bridges: Eden Bridge Drive, Eden Terrace Drive, Beeson Road, Willard Road, NC 68

Beaver Creek is a 6.16 mi (9.91 km) long 2nd order tributary to Reedy Fork, in Guilford County, North Carolina.

== Course ==
Beaver Creek rises in Forsyth County on the divide between Beaver Creek and East Belews Creek (Dan River). Beaver Creek then flows northeast into Guilford County to meet the Haw River about 3 miles east-southeast of Oak Ridge, North Carolina.

== Watershed ==
Beaver Creek drains 6.74 square miles (17.5 km^{2}) of area, receives about 45.2 in/year of precipitation, has a wetness index of 409.13 and is about 35% forested.
