= Summerfield Historic District =

Historic district in North Carolina, United States

- U.S. National Register of Historic Places
- U.S. Historic district
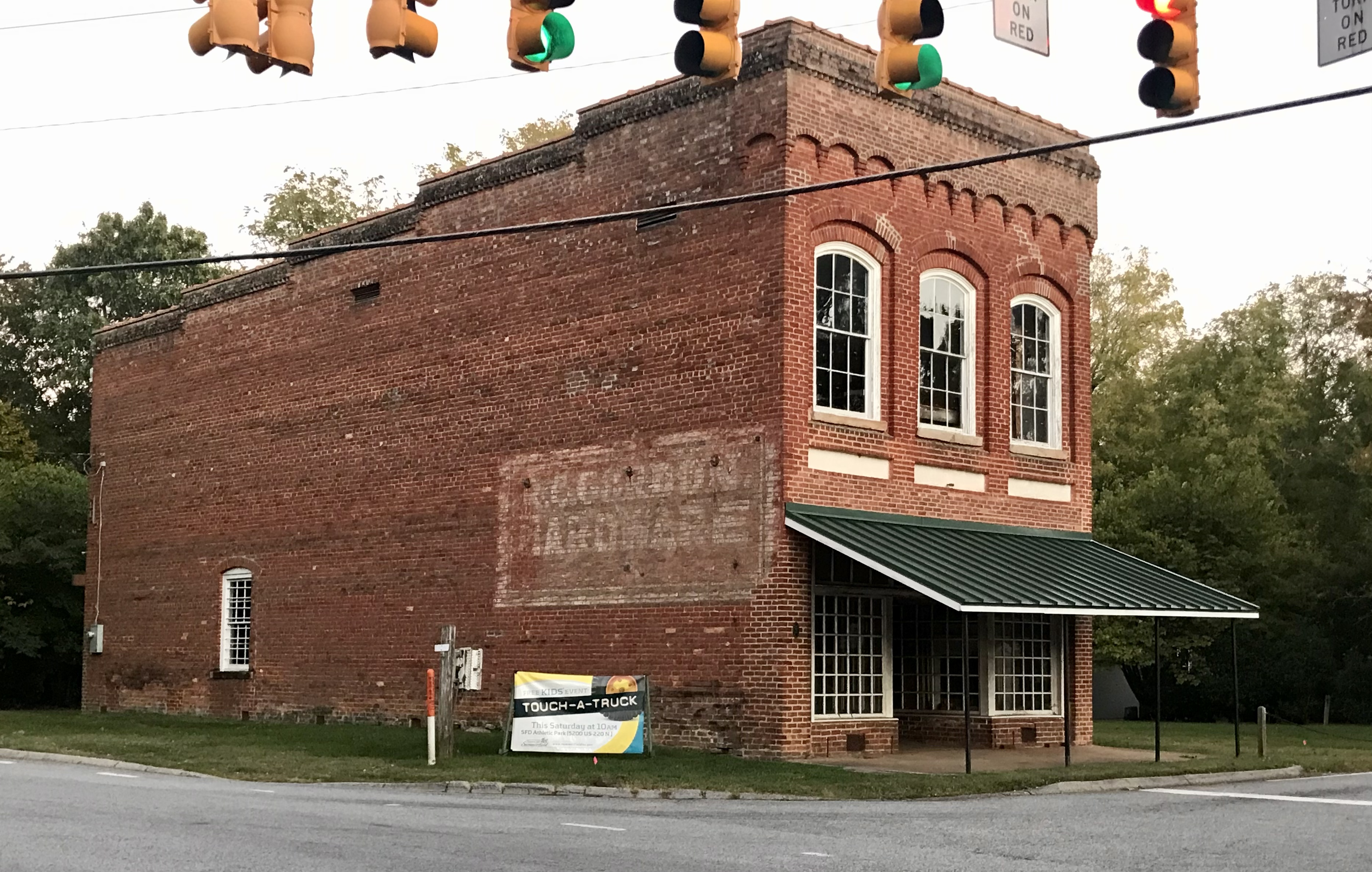
- Ogburn Store

- Location within North Carolina Location within the United States
- Location: 4105-4210 Oak Ridge Rd. and 7702-7804 Summerfield Rd., Summerfield, North Carolina
- Coordinates: 36°12′25″N 79°54′21″W
- Area: 26 acres (11 ha)
- Built: 1888
- Architectural style: Greek Revival, Queen Anne
- NRHP reference No.: 05000437
- Added to NRHP: May 18, 2005

Summerfield Historic District is a national historic district located at Summerfield, Guilford County, North Carolina. The district encompasses 33 contributing buildings and 2 contributing structures in the crossroads village of Summerfield. Notable buildings include the Henry Clay Brittain Store (Summerfield Town Hall, c. 1870), the Ogburn Store (c. 1870s), the two-story double-pile Greek Revival style Alexander Strong Martin House (c. 1840), and the Queen Anne style Henry Clay Brittain House (c. 1903). It was listed on the National Register of Historic Places in 2005.
