= Horsepen Creek (Reedy Fork tributary) =

Stream in North Carolina, USA

Horsepen Creek Tributary to Reedy Fork
- Location of Horsepen Creek mouth Horsepen Creek (Reedy Fork tributary) (the United States)

Location
- Country: United States
- State: North Carolina
- County: Guilford

Physical characteristics
- Source: divide between Horsepen Creek and East Fork Deep River
  - location: Piedmont Triad International Airport
  - coordinates: 36°04′53″N 079°55′44″W
  - elevation: 865 ft (264 m)
- Mouth: Reedy Fork
  - location: Lake Brandt
  - coordinates: 36°10′13″N 079°50′24″W
  - elevation: 743 ft (226 m)
- Length: 8.87 mi (14.27 km)
- Basin size: 20.13 square miles (52.1 km^{2})
- Discharge
  - location: Reedy Fork
  - average: 21.67 cu ft/s (0.614 m^{3}/s) at mouth with Reedy Fork

Basin features
- Progression: Reedy Fork → Haw River → Cape Fear River → Atlantic Ocean
- River system: Haw River
- Tributaries
  - left: unnamed tributaries
  - right: unnamed tributaries
- Waterbodies: Lake Brandt
- Bridges: Distribution Drive, I-73, Joseph M Bryan Blvd., Horse Pen Creek Road, US 220, I-840, Old Battleground Road, Quaker Landing Road

Horsepen Creek is a 8.87 mi (14.27 km) long 3rd order tributary to Reedy Fork in Guilford County, North Carolina.

== History ==
The Battlefield of Guilford Courthouse was fought in part on the eastern edge of the Horsepen Creek watershed.

== Course ==
Horsepen Creek rises on the East Fork Deep River divide at Piedmont Triad International Airport in Guilford County, North Carolina. Horsepen Creek then flows northeast to meet Reedy Fork in Lake Brandt.

== Watershed ==
Horsepen Creek drains 20.13 square miles (52.1 km^{2}) of area, receives about 45.0 in/year of precipitation, has a topographic wetness index of 444.82 and is about 18% forested.
