= Buffalo Creek (Reedy Fork tributary) =

Stream in North Carolina, US

Buffalo Creek Tributary to Reedy Fork
- Location of Buffalo Creek mouth Buffalo Creek (Reedy Fork tributary) (the United States)

Location
- Country: United States
- State: North Carolina
- County: Guilford

Physical characteristics
- Source: confluence of South Buffalo and North Buffalo Creeks
  - location: about 2 miles north of McLeansville, North Carolina
  - coordinates: 36°07′40″N 079°39′44″W
  - elevation: 660 ft (200 m)
- Mouth: Reedy Fork
  - location: about 6 miles south of Osceola, North Carolina
  - coordinates: 36°10′27″N 079°36′05″W
  - elevation: 618 ft (188 m)
- Length: 8.31 mi (13.37 km)
- Basin size: 100.58 square miles (260.5 km^{2})
- Discharge
  - location: Reedy Fork
  - average: 137.07 cu ft/s (3.881 m^{3}/s) at mouth with Reedy Fork

Basin features
- Progression: Reedy Fork → Haw River → Cape Fear River → Atlantic Ocean
- River system: Haw River
- Tributaries
  - left: unnamed tributaries
  - right: Blackwood Creek
- Bridges: McLeansville Road, High Rock Road, Huffline Mill Road

Buffalo Creek is a 8.31 mi (13.37 km) long 4th order tributary to Reedy Fork in Guilford County, North Carolina.

== Variant names ==
According to the Geographic Names Information System, it has also been known historically as:

- South Buffalo Creek

== Course ==
Buffalo Creek is formed at the confluence of South and North Buffalo Creeks in Guilford County about 2 miles north of McLeansville, North Carolina. Buffalo Creek then flows northeast to meet Reedy Fork about 6 miles south of Osceola.

== Watershed ==
Buffalo Creek drains 100.58 square miles (260.5 km^{2}) of area, receives about 45.5 in/year of precipitation, has a topographic wetness index of 439.98 and is about 19% forested.
