= Battle of Summerfield =

Skirmish in North Carolina during the American Revolution

Coordinates: 36.2009°N 79.9033°W

- Part of the American Revolutionary War
Date	February 12, 1781
Location	Present-day Summerfield, North Carolina
Result	Patriot victory

Belligerents
United States	Great Britain

Commanders and leaders
Henry Lee III; James Armstrong; Stephen Lewis	Banastre Tarleton; Cornet Miller (POW)

Strength
Unknown	Unknown

Casualties and losses
1 killed (James Gillis)	20 killed 4 captured

The Battle of Summerfield was a skirmish in the area that today is Summerfield, North Carolina in present-day northern Guilford County, between Patriot forces under the command of Col. Henry Lee III and British forces of Banastre Tarleton on February 12, 1781. According to Patriot lore, twenty British dragoons were killed and four captured without loss to Lee's cavalry except a bugler they had abandoned.

One month prior to the Battle of Guilford Courthouse, the armies of Col. Otho Williams and Col. Henry Lee halted at the home of Charles Bruce. While Williams and Lee were dining, farmer Isaac Wright reported that British dragoons had been seen nearby. Williams ordered Lee to investigate and Lee dispatched Captain James Armstrong with a division of his men to the area. Wright's horse was too tired to return so Lee offered the horse of his bugler boy, 14-year-old James Gillis. But Lee allowed Gillis to follow the farmer's party on the tired horse.

The Patriot cavalry stumbled upon the British vanguard and raced back to warn Lee. Some British dragoons chased the fleeing Patriots and Gillis, with his tired horse, was overtaken and killed. Col. Lee ordered his men to return and rescue Gillis but they arrived too late. Lee's troops then charged and killed seven of the dragoons but British reinforcements led by Captain Cornet Miller arrived as the fighting intensified. After thirteen more British dragoons were killed, Captain Miller tried to escape but was captured by Lt. Stephen Lewis along with three of his men.

Upon their return, Lee reprimanded Lewis for not carrying out his orders to kill any prisoners. Miller was brought before Lee who blamed him for the death of Gillis, the bugler Lee had allowed into danger. Lee ordered his summary execution and told Miller to write his last words to his friends. However, the British Army was seen approaching and Lee retreated to Williams camp. Captain Miller was then escorted to Major General Nathanael Greene as a prisoner of war.

Today there are two memorials dedicated to James Gillis. One has been placed at the Guilford Courthouse National Military Park and another at the site of his death. There is also a state historical marker in Summerfield.
