= Moores Creek (Reedy Fork tributary) =

Stream in North Carolina, USA

Moores Creek Tributary to Reedy Fork
- Location of Moores Creek mouth Moores Creek (Reedy Fork tributary) (the United States)

Location
- Country: United States
- State: North Carolina
- County: Guilford

Physical characteristics
- Source: divide between Moores Creek and Brush Creek
  - location: pond about 1 mile north of Piedmont-Triad International Airport
  - coordinates: 36°07′43″N 079°54′16″W
  - elevation: 915 ft (279 m)
- Mouth: Reedy Fork
  - location: about 1.5 miles south of Summerfield, North Carolina
  - coordinates: 36°10′44″N 079°54′16″W
  - elevation: 751 ft (229 m)
- Length: 5.12 mi (8.24 km)
- Basin size: 4.61 square miles (11.9 km^{2})
- Discharge
  - location: Reedy Fork
  - average: 5.26 cu ft/s (0.149 m^{3}/s) at mouth with Reedy Fork

Basin features
- Progression: Reedy Fork → Haw River → Cape Fear River → Atlantic Ocean
- River system: Haw River
- Tributaries
  - left: unnamed tributaries
  - right: unnamed tributaries
- Bridges: Alcorn Road, Rambling Road, Stanley Huff Road

Moores Creek is a 5.12 mi (8.24 km) long 1st order tributary to Reedy Fork in Guilford County, North Carolina.

== Course ==
Moores Creek rises in a pond about 1 mile north of Piedmont-Triad International Airport in Guilford County on the divide between Moores Creek and Brush Creek. Moores Creek then flows northeast to meet the Haw River about 1.5 miles south of Summerfield, North Carolina.

== Watershed ==
Moores Creek drains 4.21 square miles (10.9 km^{2}) of area, receives about 44.9 in/year of precipitation, has a topographic wetness index of 396.37 and is about 47% forested.
