= Summerfield School Gymnasium and Community Center =

- U.S. National Register of Historic Places
- Location within North Carolina Location within the United States
- Location: 7515 Trainer Dr., Summerfield, North Carolina
- Coordinates: 36°12′01″N 79°54′18″W
- Area: Less than one acre
- Built: 1938-1939, 1955
- Architectural style: Rustic Revival
- NRHP reference No.: 12000575
- Added to NRHP: August 28, 2012

Summerfield School Gymnasium and Community Center, also known as Summerfield Rock Gym, is a historic gymnasium building located at Summerfield, Guilford County, North Carolina. It was built in 1938-1939 as part of a Works Progress Administration (WPA) project at a rural consolidated high school. It is a 1 1/2-story, Rustic Revival-style granite rubble stone building. It has a small concrete-block rear addition dated to about 1955.

It was listed on the National Register of Historic Places in 2012.
