= Brush Creek (Reedy Fork tributary) =

Stream in North Carolina, USA

Brush Creek Tributary to Reedy Fork
- Location of Brush Creek mouth Brush Creek (Reedy Fork tributary) (the United States)

Location
- Country: United States
- State: North Carolina
- County: Guilford

Physical characteristics
- Source: divide between Brush Creek and Deep River
  - location: about 0.5 miles northwest of Piedmont Triad International Airport
  - coordinates: 36°07′17″N 079°57′46″W
  - elevation: 910 ft (280 m)
- Mouth: Reedy Fork
  - location: Lake Brandt
  - coordinates: 36°10′18″N 079°52′38″W
  - elevation: 741 ft (226 m)
- Length: 8.15 mi (13.12 km)
- Basin size: 11.74 square miles (30.4 km^{2})
- Discharge
  - location: Reedy Fork
  - average: 12.82 cu ft/s (0.363 m^{3}/s) at mouth with Reedy Fork

Basin features
- Progression: Reedy Fork → Haw River → Cape Fear River → Atlantic Ocean
- River system: Haw River
- Tributaries
  - left: unnamed tributaries
  - right: unnamed tributaries
- Waterbodies: Lake Higgins; Lake Brandt
- Bridges: NC 68, Cornerstone Drive, Ted Johnson Parkway, I-73, Muirfield Drive, Fleming Road, Brass Eagle Loop, Lewiston Road, Carlson Dairy Road, US 220

Brush Creek is a 8.15 mi (13.12 km) long 2nd order tributary to Reedy Fork in Guilford County, North Carolina.

== Course ==
Brush Creek rises on the Deep River divide about 0.5 miles northwest of Piedmont Triad International Airport in Guilford County, North Carolina. Brush Creek then flows northeast to meet Reedy Fork in Lake Brandt.

== Watershed ==
Brush Creek drains 11.74 square miles (30.4 km^{2}) of area, receives about 44.8 in/year of precipitation, has a topographic wetness index of 419.83 and is about 26% forested.
