= Richland Creek (Reedy Fork tributary) =

Stream in North Carolina, USA

Richland Creek Tributary to Reedy Fork
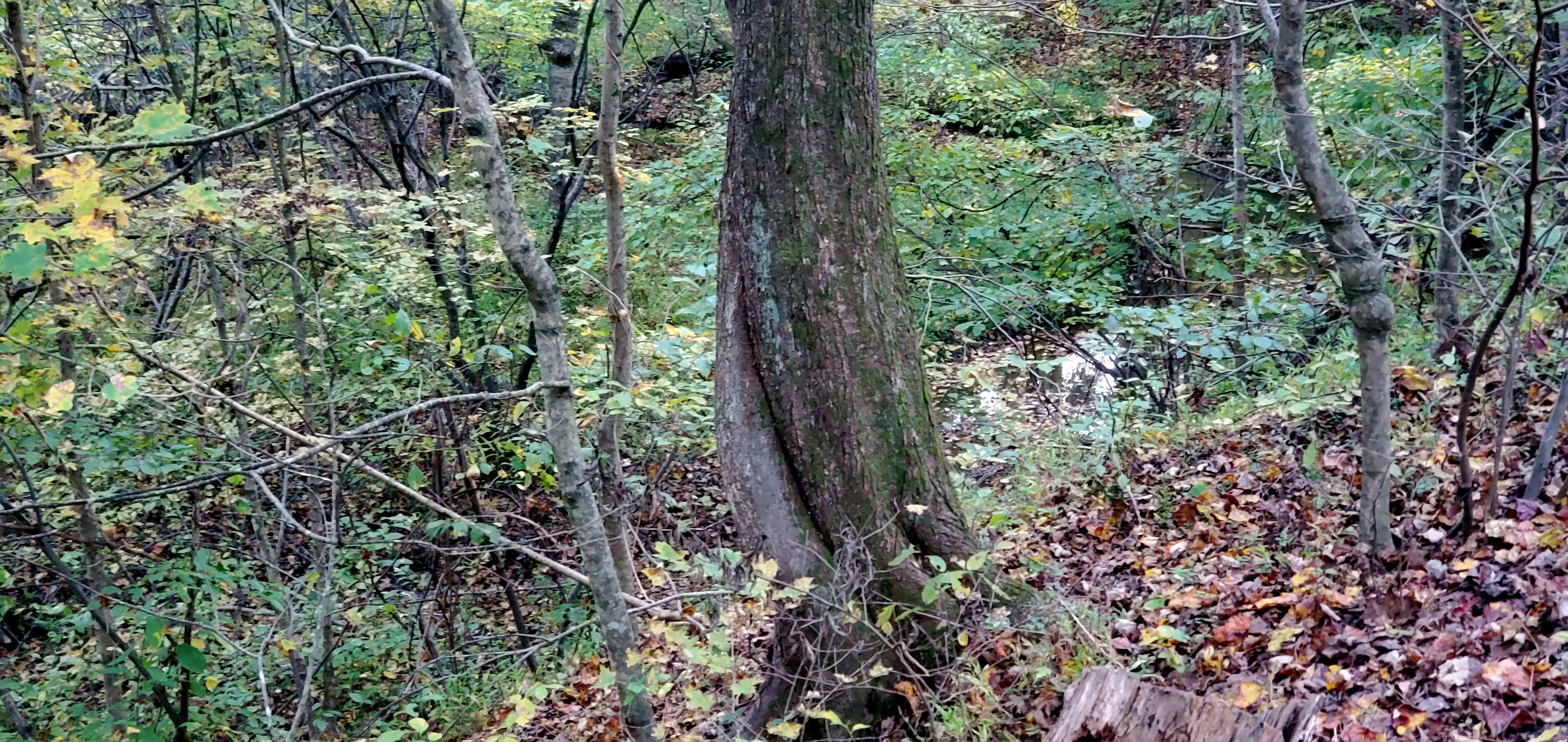

- Location of Richland Creek mouth Richland Creek (Reedy Fork tributary) (the United States)

Location
- Country: United States
- State: North Carolina
- County: Guilford
- City: Greensboro

Physical characteristics
- Source: divide between Richland Creek and Buffalo Creek
  - location: Greensboro, North Carolina near Jaycee Park
  - coordinates: 36°07′13″N 079°50′02″W
  - elevation: 850 ft (260 m)
- Mouth: Reedy Fork
  - location: Lake Townsend
  - coordinates: 36°09′59″N 079°46′59″W
  - elevation: 717 ft (219 m)
- Length: 5.29 mi (8.51 km)
- Basin size: 8.27 square miles (21.4 km^{2})
- Discharge
  - location: Reedy Fork
  - average: 9.47 cu ft/s (0.268 m^{3}/s) at mouth with Reedy Fork

Basin features
- Progression: Reedy Fork → Haw River → Cape Fear River → Atlantic Ocean
- River system: Haw River
- Tributaries
  - left: unnamed tributaries
  - right: unnamed tributaries
- Waterbodies: Richland Lake; Lake Townsend
- Bridges: Guilford Courthouse National Park Road, Lawndale Drive, Bluff Run Drive, Bass Chapel Road, N Church Street

Richland Creek is a 5.29 mi (8.51 km) long 3rd order tributary to Reedy Fork in Guilford County, North Carolina.

== History ==
Richland Creek was the scene of the Battle of Guilford Courthouse in 1781.

== Course ==
Richland Creek rises on the Buffalo Creek divide at Jaycee Park in Greensboro in Guilford County. Richland Creek then flows north through Guilford Courthouse National Military Park and then turns northeast to Richland Lake. It drains into Lake Townsend, where it meets Reedy Fork.

== Watershed ==
Richland Creek drains 8.27 square miles (21.4 km^{2}) of area, receives about 45.3 in/year of precipitation, has a topographic wetness index of 440.36 and is about 20% forested.
