= Mears Fork =

Stream in North Carolina, USA

Mears Fork Tributary to Haw River
- Location of Mears Fork mouth Mears Fork (the United States)

Location
- Country: United States
- State: North Carolina
- County: Guilford

Physical characteristics
- Source: divide between Mears Fork, Haw River, and Reedy Fork
  - location: Summerfield, North Carolina
  - coordinates: 36°12′32″N 079°53′57″W
  - elevation: 878 ft (268 m)
- Mouth: Haw River
  - location: about 2 miles south of Midway, North Carolina
  - coordinates: 36°14′51″N 079°47′04″W
  - elevation: 699 ft (213 m)
- Length: 7.77 mi (12.50 km)
- Basin size: 12.59 square miles (32.6 km^{2})
- Discharge
  - location: Haw River
  - average: 14.63 cu ft/s (0.414 m^{3}/s) at mouth with Haw River

Basin features
- Progression: Haw River → Cape Fear River → Atlantic Ocean
- River system: Haw River
- Tributaries
  - left: unnamed tributaries
  - right: unnamed tributaries
- Bridges: Strawberry Road, Lake Brandt Road, Cedar Ridge Farm Road

Mears Fork is a 7.77 mi (12.50 km) long third order tributary to the Haw River, in Guilford County, North Carolina.

== Variant names ==
According to the Geographic Names Information System, it has also been known historically as:

- Mears Fork Creek

== Course ==
Mears Fork rises on the divide between Mears Fork, Haw River, and Reedy Fork at Summerfield in Guilford County. Mears Fork then flows northeast to meet the Haw River about 2 miles south of Midway, North Carolina.

== Watershed ==
Mears Fork drains 12.59 square miles (32.6 km^{2}) of area, receives about 45.7 in/year of precipitation, has a topographic wetness index of 409.05 and is about 50% forested.

== Natural history ==
The Natural Areas Inventory Guilford County, North Carolina and a later addition in 1995 recognized nine locations of natural significance in the Mears Fork watershed. These sites include:

- Witty Road Wetland (County General Significant)--the location of semi-impermanent impoundment and alluvial forest.
- Cummings Dairy Beaver Pond (County General Significant)--the location of a shrub swamp from an old beaver pond.
- Strader Road Beaver Pond (County General Significant)--the location of a beaver pond.
- Trailing Cedar Farm (County High Significant)--the location of wetland and forested communities with rare species.
- Burnt Oaks (County General Significant)--the location of beaver pond wetlands and forested slopes.
- Mears Fork at Lake Brandt Road (County High Significant)--the location of a mature Dry-Mesic Oak-Hickory Forest and Mesic Mixed Hardwood Forest.
- Cedar Hollow Alluvial Forest (County Low Significant)--the location of Piedmont Alluvial Forest.
- Mear Fork at Church Street (County General Significant)--the location of mature Dry-Mesic Oak-Hickory Forest.
- Church Street Ginseng Slope (County General Significant)--the location of a mature Mesic Mixed Hardwood Forest.

== See also ==
- List of rivers of North Carolina
