= Candy Creek (Haw River tributary) =

Stream in North Carolina, US

Candy Creek Tributary to Haw River
- Location of Candy Creek mouth Candy Creek (Haw River tributary) (the United States)

Location
- Country: United States
- State: North Carolina
- County: Rockingham; Guilford

Physical characteristics
- Source: divide between Candy Creek and Reedy Fork
  - location: about 1 mile east of Monticello, North Carolina
  - coordinates: 36°13′17″N 079°39′31″W
  - elevation: 780 ft (240 m)
- Mouth: Haw River
  - location: about 5 miles south of Reidsville, North Carolina
  - coordinates: 36°15′54″N 079°38′56″W
  - elevation: 675 ft (206 m)
- Length: 3.03 mi (4.88 km)
- Basin size: 3.10 square miles (8.0 km^{2})
- Discharge
  - location: Haw River
  - average: 3.90 cu ft/s (0.110 m^{3}/s) at mouth with Haw River

Basin features
- Progression: Haw River → Cape Fear River → Atlantic Ocean
- River system: Haw River
- Tributaries
  - left: unnamed tributaries
  - right: unnamed tributaries
- Bridges: Candy Creek Road, US 29

Candy Creek is a 3.10 mi (4.99 km) long 1st order tributary to the Haw River, in Rockingham County, North Carolina.

== Variant names ==
According to the Geographic Names Information System, it has also been known historically as:

- Kanady Creek
- Kenadys Branch

== Course ==
Candy Creek rises on the divide between Candy Creek and Reedy Fork about 1 mile east of Monticello, North Carolina in Guilford County. Candy Creek then flows north-northeast into Rockingham County to meet the Haw River about 5 miles south of Reidsville, North Carolina.

== Watershed ==
Candy Creek drains 3.10 square miles (8.0 km^{2}) of area, receives about 46.2 in/year of precipitation, has a topographic wetness index of 403.48 and is about 29% forested.

== Natural history ==
The Rockingham County Natural Heritage Inventory recognized one location in the Candy Creek watershed, Candy Creek Beaver Pond. Candy Creek Beaver Pond is of local significance and is part of a larger wetland system.

== See also ==
- List of rivers of North Carolina

== Additional images ==
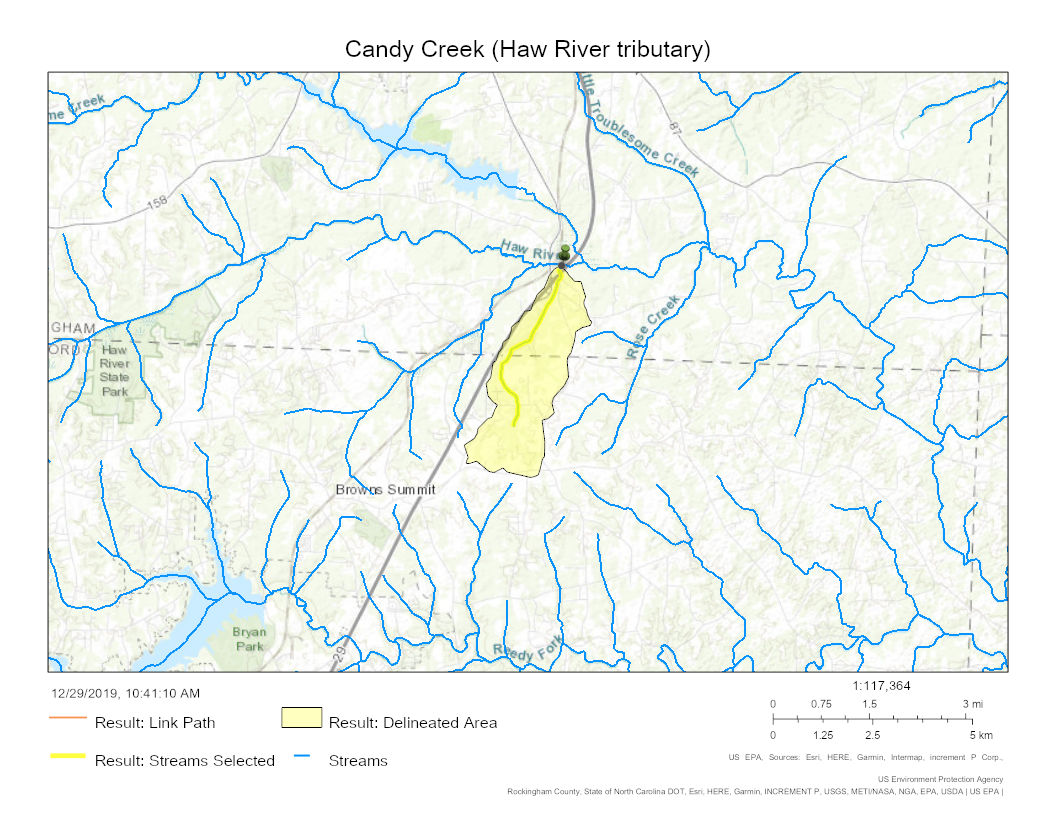
Course and Watershed of Candy Creek (Haw River tributary)
