= John Summerfield =

Methodist evangelist, co-founder American Tract Society

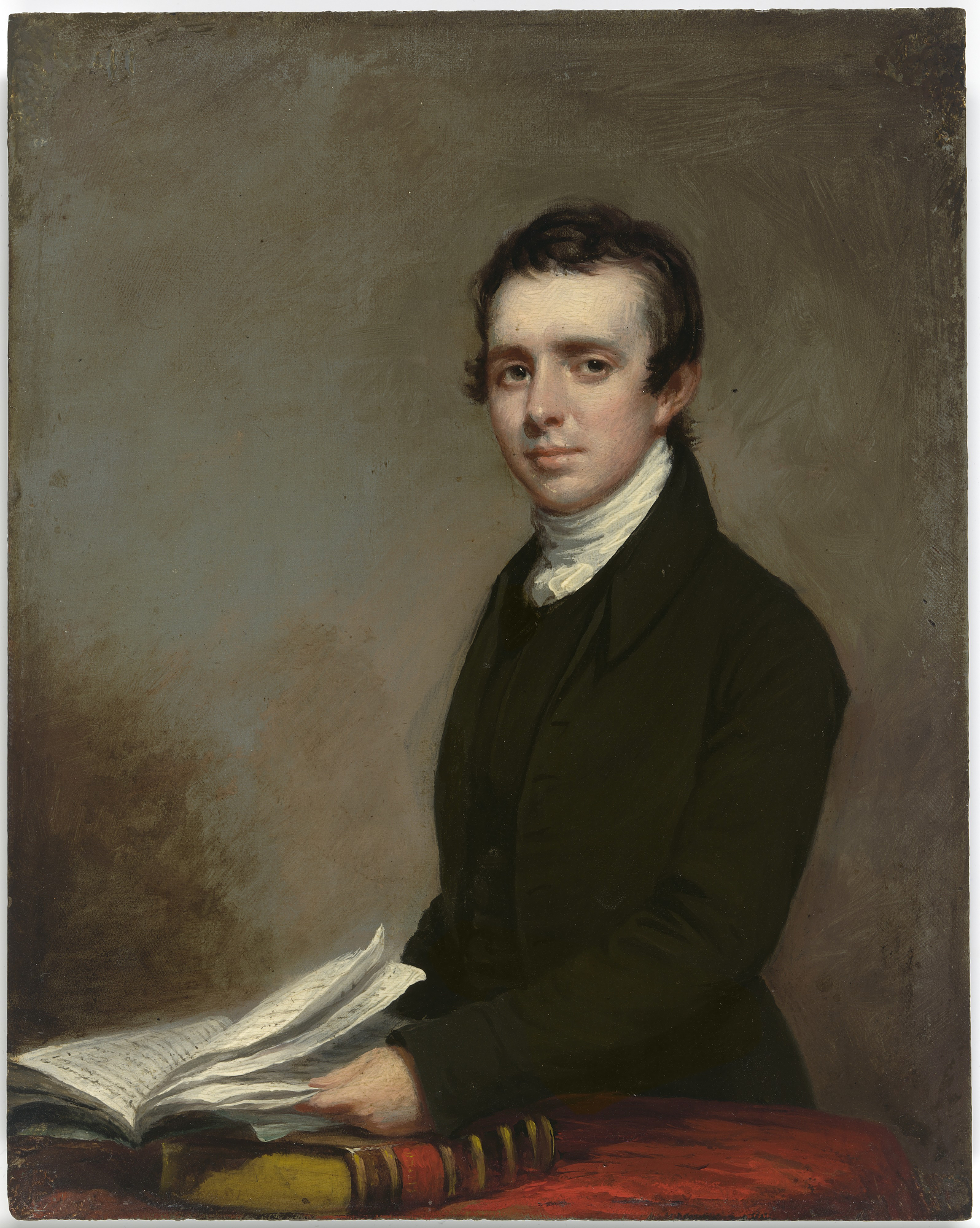
- Born: 31 January 1798; Preston
- Died: 13 June 1825 (aged 27); New York City
- Occupation: Clergyman

John Summerfield, clergyman, born in Preston, England, 31 January 1798; died in New York City, 13 June 1825. He was educated at a Moravian school, and removed to Dublin in 1813, where he plunged into a life of dissipation, and was finally imprisoned. A period of contrition succeeding, he united in 1817 with the Wesleyans, where his pulpit talents attracted universal attention, and in 1819 he was preaching to immense congregations in Dublin and doing missionary labor. His health failing, he removed to New York in 1821, and was admitted to the Methodist conference of that state. In 1822 he visited Philadelphia, Baltimore, and Washington, his eloquence everywhere arousing enthusiasm. The same year he visited France and England, again in quest of health, and having been appointed a delegate to the anniversary meeting of the Protestant Bible society in Paris. Upon his return, in April, 1824, he preached in the large cities with great success, and formed missionary societies till the following February. He was a founder of the American Tract Society a short time before his death. Princeton gave him the degree of M. A. in 1822. His biography was written by John Holland (New York, 1829) and by William M. Willett (Philadelphia, 1857), and his Sermons and Sketches of Sermons were published (New York, 1842).

The town of Summerfield, North Carolina, was named in his honor.
