= Morehead Township, Guilford County, North Carolina =

Morehead Township
- Township
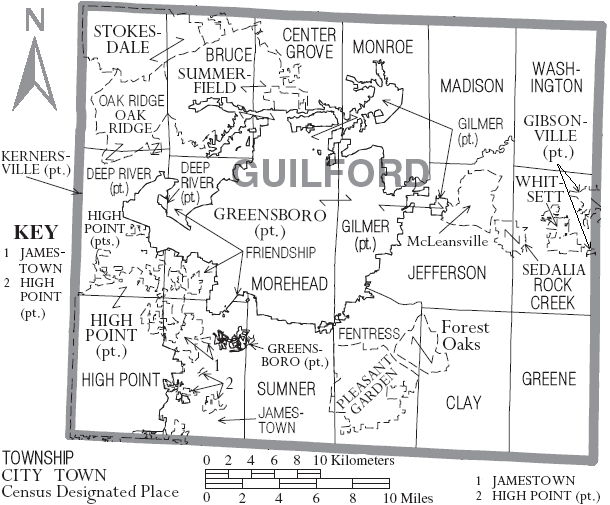
- Morehead Township in Guilford County

- Location within North Carolina Location within the United States
- Country: United States
- State: North Carolina
- County: Guilford
- Established: 1868

Government
  - Type: non-functioning county subdivision
- Time zone: UTC-5 (Eastern (EST))
  - Summer (DST): UTC-4 (EDT)

Morehead Township is a rural, non-functioning county subdivision established in 1868 in Guilford County, North Carolina, United States.. The population at the 2010 census was 195,218.

== History ==
Morehead Township was created as an administrative division of Guilford County in 1868, as required by the North Carolina Constitution as re-written in 1868.

== Other facts ==
- Metro Area: Greensboro Area
- ZIP Codes: 27235, 27265, 27282, 27358, 27401, 27403, 27405, 27406, 27407, 27408, 27409, 27410, 27455
- Unified School District: Guilford County
- Congressional Districts: NC-6, NC-12
- State Senate Districts: NC-26, NC-27, NC-28
- State House Districts: NC-57, NC-58, NC-59, NC-60, NC-61, NC-62

Neighboring Townships:

- Bruce
- Center Grove
- Deep River
- Fentress
- Friendship
- Gilmer,
- Jamestown
- Monroe
- Sumner

Nearby Townships:

- Abbotts Creek
- Abbotts Creek
- Belews Creek

Historical population
Census	Pop.	Note	%±
1870	2,104		—
1880	2,699		28.3%
1890	2,331		−13.6%
1900	6,802		191.8%
1910	12,340		81.4%
1920	17,621		42.8%
1930	31,225		77.2%
1940	36,800		17.9%
1950	52,728		43.3%
1960	70,689		34.1%
1970	91,177		29.0%
1980	102,082		12.0%
1990	129,955		27.3%
2000	165,130		27.1%
2010	195,218		18.2%

- Clay
- High Point
- Jefferson
- Kernersville
- Level Cross
- Madison
- Oak Ridge
