= Benaja Creek (Haw River tributary) =

Haw River tributary in North Carolina, U.S.

Benaja Creek Tributary to Haw River
- Location of Benaja Creek mouth Benaja Creek (Haw River tributary) (the United States)

Location
- Country: United States
- State: North Carolina
- County: Rockingham; Guilford

Physical characteristics
- Source: divide between Benaja Creek and Haw River
  - location: about 3 miles north of Browns Summit, North Carolina
  - coordinates: 36°14′53″N 079°42′22″W
  - elevation: 780 ft (240 m)
- Mouth: Haw River
  - location: about 5 miles south of Reidsville, North Carolina
  - coordinates: 36°15′53″N 079°39′26″W
  - elevation: 675 ft (206 m)
- Length: 3.73 mi (6.00 km)
- Basin size: 10.58 square miles (27.4 km^{2})
- Discharge
  - location: Haw River
  - average: 12.67 cu ft/s (0.359 m^{3}/s) at mouth with Haw River

Basin features
- Progression: Haw River → Cape Fear River → Atlantic Ocean
- River system: Haw River
- Tributaries
  - left: unnamed tributaries
  - right: unnamed tributaries
- Waterbodies: unnamed waterbodies
- Bridges: Benaja Road

Benaja Creek is a 3.73 mi (6.00 km) long 2nd order tributary to the Haw River, in Rockingham County, North Carolina.

== Variant names ==
According to the Geographic Names Information System, it has also been known historically as Benjar Creek.

== Course ==
Benaja Creek rises on the divide between Benaja Creek and Haw River about 3 miles north of Browns Summit in Rockingham County, North Carolina. Benaja Creek then flows southeast barely into Guilford County before turning northeast back into Rockingham County to meet the Haw River about 5 miles south of Reidsville, North Carolina.

== Watershed ==
Benaja Creek drains 10.58 square miles (27.4 km^{2}) of area, receives about 46.1 in/year of precipitation, has a topographic wetness index of 421.17 and is about 33% forested.

== Natural history ==
The Rockingham County Natural Heritage Inventory recognized one location in the Benaja Creek watershed, Benaja Alluvial Forest. Benaja Alluvial Forest is a county significant floodplain/alluvial forest that is part of a larger wetland system. Skunk cabbage (Symplocarpus foetidus) and overcup oak (Quercus lyrata) are present in this forest.

== See also ==
- List of rivers of North Carolina
