= Richland Creek (Big Creek tributary) =

Stream in the American state of Missouri

Coordinates: 37.3753271°N 90.7081755°W

Richland Creek is a stream in Iron County in the U.S. state of Missouri. It is a tributary of Big Creek.

Richland Creek was so named on account of their rich soil.

== See also ==
- List of rivers of Missouri
