= Richland Creek (Oconee River tributary) =

Stream in Greene County of Georgia, U.S.

Coordinates: 33°22′40″N 83°10′17″W

Richland Creek is a stream in Greene County of the U.S. state of Georgia. It is a tributary to the Oconee River within Lake Oconee.

Richland Creek was so named from the rich farmland along its course.
