= Richland Creek (Kansas) =

Stream in Bourbon and Crawford County, Kansas, U.S.

Coordinates: 37.6714334°N 94.7157961°W

Richland Creek is a stream in Bourbon and Crawford counties, in the U.S. state of Kansas.

Richland Creek was named for the fertility of their soil.

== See also ==
- List of rivers of Kansas
