= Richland Creek (Missouri River tributary) =

Stream in the U.S. state of Missouri

Richland Creek is a stream in Howard County in the U.S. state of Missouri. It is a tributary of the Missouri River.

The stream headwaters arise at 39°06′49″N 92°50′13″W at elevation of approximately 820 feet adjacent to the east side of Missouri Route 87 about 2.5 miles north of the community of Boonesboro. The stream flows to the north for about 2.5 miles, then turns to the west passing under Route 87. The stream flows westward for about three miles to its confluence with the Missouri about five miles south of Glasgow at 39°08′57″N 92°54′13″W at an elevation of 594 feet.

Richland Creek was so named due to the fertile soil along its course.

== See also ==
- List of rivers of Missouri
