= Greensboro Arboretum =

Arboretum in Greensboro, North Carolina

Coordinates: 36.0701°N 79.8413°W

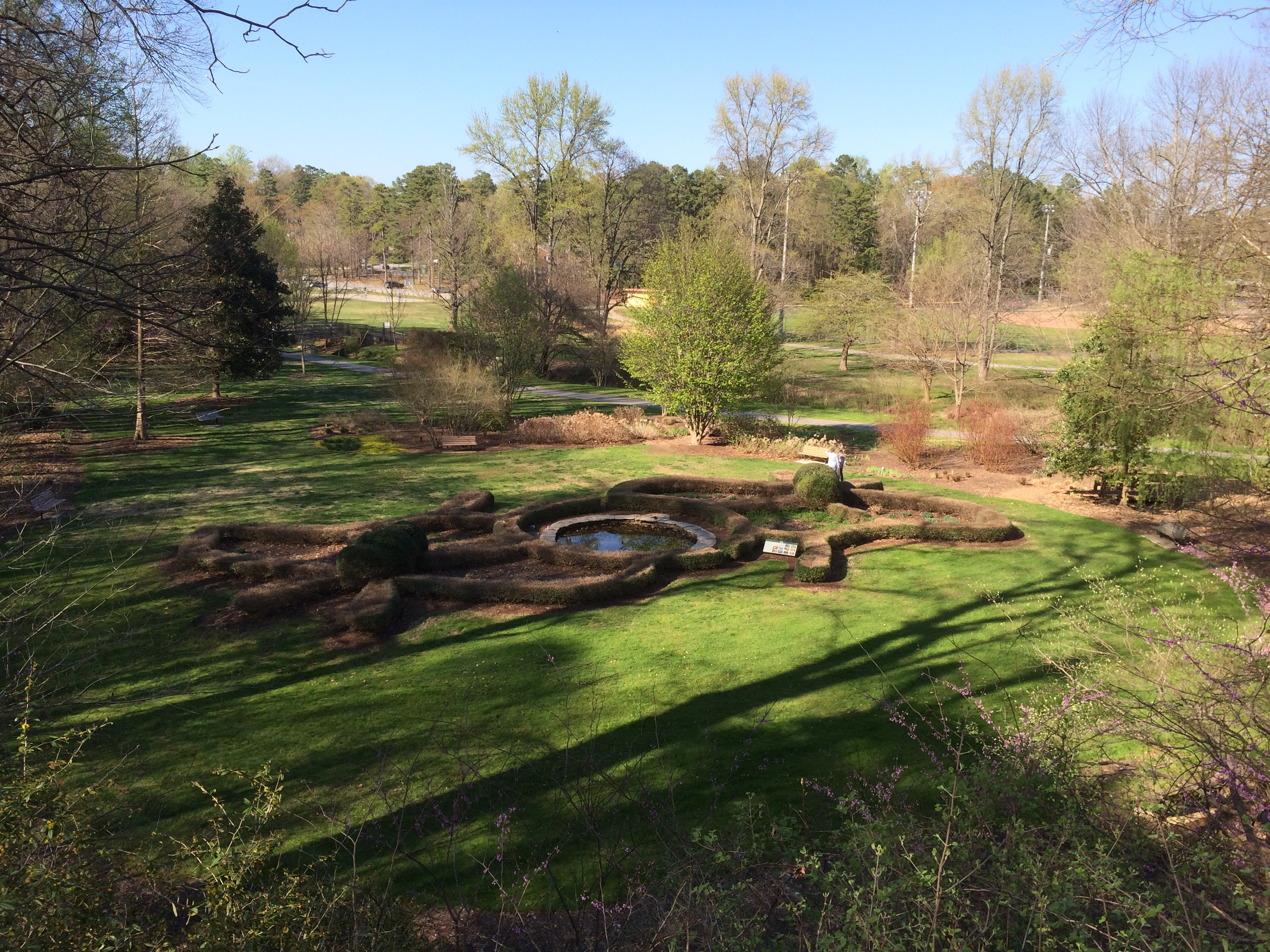
- Interactive map of Greensboro Arboretum
- Type: Arboretum
- Area: 17 acres (6.9 ha)
- Website: Official website

Greensboro Arboretum (17 acres) is an arboretum located in Lindley Park at 401 Ashland Drive, Greensboro, North Carolina and is open to the public daily without charge.

The arboretum features landscaped grounds with labeled plant collections, annual and perennial flowers, an arbor, gazebo and a lighted fountain, including the following displays and collections:

- Butterfly Garden
- Conifer Collection
- Dwarf Conifer Collection (more than 80 species of small conifers)
- Groundcover Collection
- Holly Garden
- Hosta Collection (approximately 200 hostas)
- Hydrophytic Collection
- Rhododendron Garden (over 70 varieties)
- Rose Garden
- Shade Shrub Collection
- Small Tree Collection
- Sun Shrub Collection
- Vine Collection & Perennial Border
- Wildflower Trail
- Winter Garden Collection
- Woodland Trail

== See also ==
- List of botanical gardens in the United States
