= Hillsdale, North Carolina =

Unincorporated community in North Carolina, US

Coordinates: 36°00′18″N 80°26′22″W

Hillsdale is an unincorporated community in Davie County, North Carolina, United States. It borders Bermuda Run to the northwest and is located along U.S. Route 158 near its intersection with NC 801. Interstate 40 passes through Hillsdale and is accessed by the NC 801 interchange (exit 180). The community is often considered a part of Advance or Bermuda Run. Hillsdale is also considered a suburb of Winston-Salem. Neighboring communities and municipalities include: Clemmons, Advance, Bermuda Run, Mocksville, Lewisville and Yadkinville.
