= Summerfield, North Carolina =

- Town
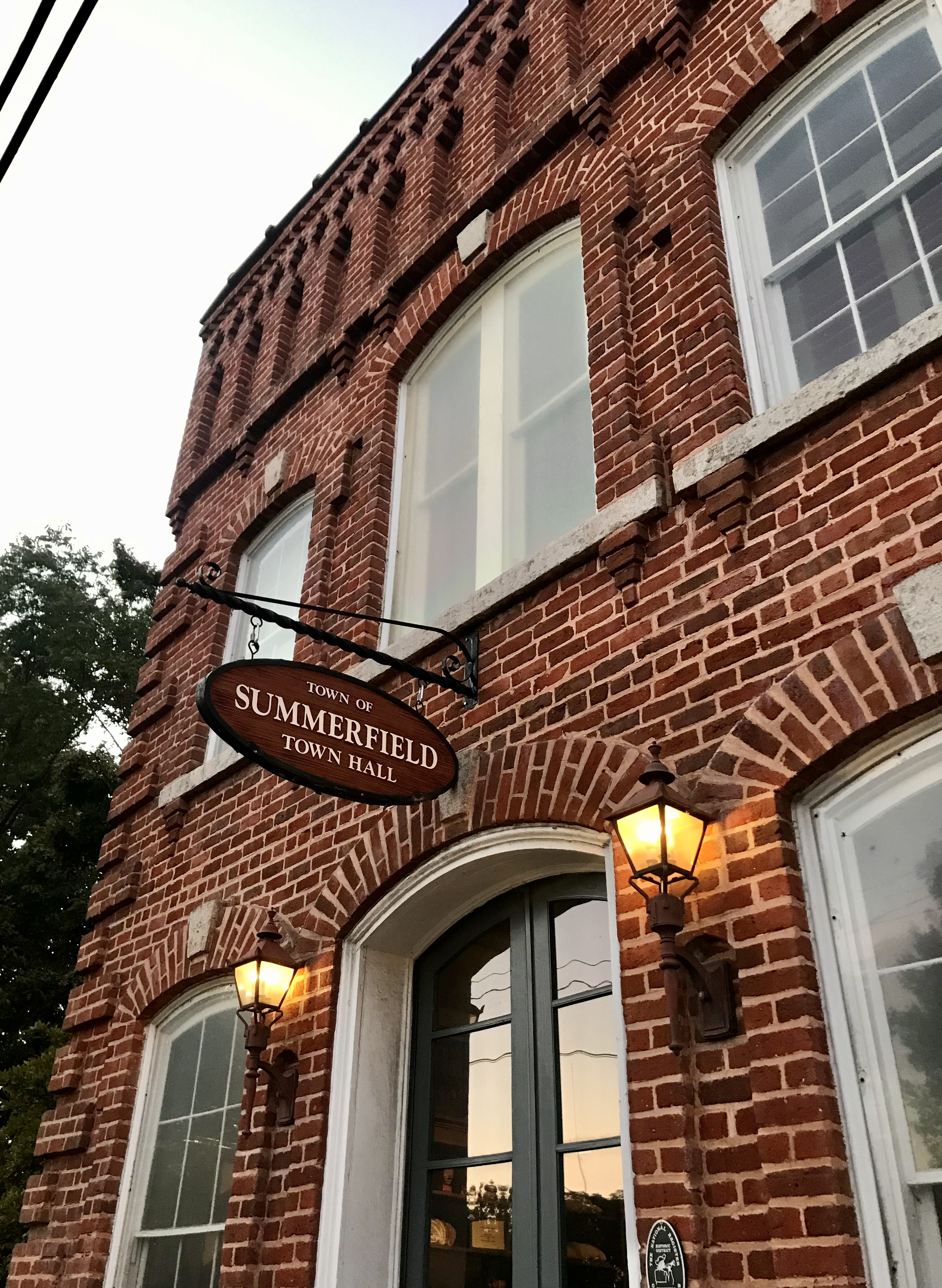
- Summerfield Town Hall
- Motto: "Respectful of the Past; Focused on the Future"
- Location in Guilford County and the state of North Carolina.
- Coordinates: 36°11′51″N 79°53′59″W
- Country: United States
- State: North Carolina
- County: Guilford
- Founded: 1769
- Incorporated: 1996
- Named for: John Summerfield

Government
  - Mayor: Lee Haywood
  - Mayor Pro Tem: Lynne Williams DeVaney
  - Town Council: Jeff Davis, Janelle Robinson, Reece Walker, Lynne DeVaney, John Doggett

Area
  - Total: 26.69 sq mi (69.12 km^{2})
  - Land: 26.40 sq mi (68.37 km^{2})
  - Water: 0.29 sq mi (0.75 km^{2})
- Elevation: 856 ft (261 m)

Population (2020)
  - Total: 10,951
  - Density: 414.9/sq mi (160.18/km^{2})
- Time zone: UTC-5 (Eastern (EST))
  - Summer (DST): UTC-4 (EDT)
- ZIP code: 27358
- Area codes: 336, 743
- FIPS code: 37-65580
- GNIS feature ID: 2406682
- Website: Official website

Summerfield is a town in Guilford County, North Carolina. As of the 2020 census, the population was 10,951.

The town is largely regarded as a suburb of Greensboro and as development has grown, the town has slowly transformed from a rural farming area into a bedroom community primarily from Northern transplants. It features a town hall, along Oak Ridge Road (aka NC 150), west of Battleground Avenue (aka US 220), as well as a shopping center east of Battleground Avenue and Auburn Road, located on the eastern portion of NC 150. Interstate 73 passes just west of the town's center, connecting with NC 150, and also connecting with US 158 in the northernmost part of the town.

== History ==
The area was settled in about 1769 by Charles Bruce and acquired the name Bruce's Crossroads. In February 1781 patriot forces under General Henry Lee III and British forces under General Banastre Tarleton skirmished at the crossroads during the American Revolutionary War. The Patriots won the battle and forced the British cavalry to retreat. In 1812 a post office was established, and the community was renamed Summerfield, in homage to evangelist John Summerfield.

Summerfield School Gymnasium and Community Center has a gym that was listed on the National Register of Historic Places in 2012. The Summerfield Historic District was listed in 2005.

Former North Carolina Governor Alexander Martin had a house that he lived in the town square of Summerfield, which is not standing today. George Washington stayed in the house during the Revolutionary War. There is currently a historical home on the square known as the Martin House, but it was lived in by a son of the Governor. Currently, the Martin House is owned by the town of Summerfield.

In June 2024, the North Carolina General Assembly voted to deannex close to 1000 acres owned by developer David Couch after officials and people living in the area opposed his planned housing development. While an appeal of the action is possible, Couch would get to develop the land without being denied permission by the town government. Nearly a year later, nearby Greensboro voted to annex a portion of this land.

== Geography ==
According to the U.S. Census Bureau, the town has a total area of 27.3 square miles (70.7 km^{2}), of which 27.1 square miles (70.2 km^{2}) is land and 0.2 square miles (0.4 km^{2}) (0.62%) is water.

== Demographics ==
Historical population
Census	Pop.	Note	%±
1980	1,680		—
1990	2,051		22.1%
2000	7,018		242.2%
2010	10,232		45.8%
2020	10,951		7.0%
2025 (est.)	11,327	▲	3.4%
U.S. Decennial Census

=== 2020 census ===
As of the 2020 census, there were 10,951 people, 3,902 households, and 3,227 families residing in the town.

The median age was 44.6 years. 25.6% of residents were under the age of 18 and 16.0% of residents were 65 years of age or older. For every 100 females, there were 101.7 males, and for every 100 females age 18 and over there were 100.1 males age 18 and over.

18.5% of residents lived in urban areas, while 81.5% lived in rural areas.

Of households in Summerfield, 39.4% had children under the age of 18 living in them. Of all households, 74.2% were married-couple households, 9.4% were households with a male householder and no spouse or partner present, and 13.0% were households with a female householder and no spouse or partner present. About 13.4% of all households were made up of individuals and 6.9% had someone living alone who was 65 years of age or older.

There were 4,014 housing units, of which 4.4% were vacant. The homeowner vacancy rate was 1.6% and the rental vacancy rate was 9.7%.

Racial composition as of the 2020 census
Race	Number	Percent
White	8,996	82.1%
Black or African American	491	4.5%
American Indian and Alaska Native	29	0.3%
Asian	487	4.4%
Native Hawaiian and Other Pacific Islander	7	0.1%
Some other race	278	2.5%
Two or more races	663	6.1%
Hispanic or Latino (of any race)	660	6.0%

=== 2010 census ===
At the 2010 census, there were 10,232 people, 2,518 households and 2,094 families residing in the town. The population density was 258.9 per square mile (100.0/km^{2}). There were 2,653 housing units at an average density of 97.9 per square mile (37.8/km^{2}). The racial makeup of the town was 93.47% Caucasian, 4.03% African American, 0.44% Native American, 0.64% Asian, 0.56% from other races, and 0.85% from two or more races. Hispanic or Latino were 1.42% of the population.

There were 2,518 households, of which 41.8% had children under the age of 18 living with them, 74.4% were married couples living together, 6.0% had a female householder with no husband present, and 16.8% were non-families. 14.0% of all households were made up of individuals, and 4.8% had someone living alone who was 65 years of age or older. The average household size was 2.78 and the average family size was 3.07.

Age distribution was 28.1% under the age of 18, 5.1% from 18 to 24, 30.5% from 25 to 44, 27.9% from 45 to 64, and 8.4% who were 65 years of age or older. The median age was 39 years. For every 100 females, there were 99.1 males. For every 100 females age 18 and over, there were 97.2 males.

The median household income was $71,738, and the median family income was $79,433. Males had a median income of $51,838 versus $32,798 for females. The per capita income for the town was $33,116. About 2.5% of families and 3.8% of the population were below the poverty line, including 4.3% of those under age 18 and 6.6% of those age 65 or over.

== Education ==
Summerfield serves as home to Summerfield Elementary School which serves as the primary school for grades kindergarten to fifth grade in the town. Summerfield Charter Academy (SCA), a charter school operated by National Heritage Academies is also located in Summerfield and educates children from kindergarten through eighth grade although it is not as open and flexible as most charter schools tend to be. Students of SCA are known as the Summerfield Stampede. Most people in Summerfield attend Northern Guilford Middle School and Northern Guilford High School, while some attend Northern Elementary School, all three located east on Route 150, in proximity to Brown Summit, and having the Nighthawk as their mascot. Some residents attend Northwest Guilford Middle School followed by Northwest Guilford High School, both of which are located nearby in Greensboro. The mascot of the NW schools and Summerfield Elementary School is the Viking.

== Notable people ==
- Elissa Cunane, professional basketball player, BK Brno
- Andrew Jackson, 7th president of the United States
- Elizabeth Kitley, former WNBA basketball player, Las Vegas Aces
- Alexander Martin, former governor of North Carolina and founding father
- Harold L. Martin, former chancellor, North Carolina A&T State University
- Jim Molinaro, former professional football player, Dallas Cowboys and Washington Redskins
- Patrick Ball, actor best known for The Pitt

== Works cited ==
- Powell, William S. (1976). The North Carolina Gazetteer: A Dictionary of Tar Heel Places. Chapel Hill: The University of North Carolina Press. ISBN 9780807812471.
