= Monticello, Guilford County, North Carolina =

- Unincorporated community
- Location within North Carolina Location within the United States
- Coordinates: 36°13′9″N 79°40′40″W
- Country: United States
- State: North Carolina
- County: Guilford
- Named for: Monticello
- Elevation: 843 ft (257 m)
- Time zone: UTC-5 (Eastern (EST))
  - Summer (DST): UTC-4 (EDT)
- ZIP code: 27214
- GNIS feature ID: 990156

Monticello is an unincorporated community in Guilford County, North Carolina, United States. It is east of Browns Summit and lies east of U.S. Route 29, on North Carolina Highway 150. Its elevation is 855 feet (261 m) above sea level.
