= Browns Summit, North Carolina =

- Unincorporated community
- Location within North Carolina Location within the United States
- Coordinates: 36°12′45″N 79°42′49″W
- Country: United States
- State: North Carolina
- County: Guilford
- Founded: 1858
- Named for: Jesse Brown
- Elevation: 804 ft (245 m)
- Time zone: UTC-5 (Eastern (EST))
  - Summer (DST): UTC-4 (EDT)
- ZIP code: 27214
- GNIS feature ID: 982041

Browns Summit (sometimes called Brown Summit) is a small unincorporated community in Guilford County, North Carolina, United States.

The community remains rural, consisting of wooded areas and a mixture of open meadows and rolling farmland, however, it is a growing and upcoming area due to the proximity to Greensboro, Burlington, and Reidsville as well for a number of other reasons: recognition of the state's plan to complete Interstate 785 near the area; the new housing developments in progress, particularly along the western area near NC Hwy 150 and Yanceyville Road; the Bryan Park Complex, located at the town's Southern boundary (Bryan Park features the BB&T Soccer complex, Lake Townsend Park (adjacent to the eponymous lake), and the Champions Golf Course).

== History ==
Jesse Brown acquired the land in the area in 1858 and established a farm. In 1863, the Richmond and Danville Railroad built a line through the area and named it Browns Summit, as Brown's farm rested at the highest point of elevation on the line.

== Works cited ==
- Powell, William S. (1976). The North Carolina Gazetteer: A Dictionary of Tar Heel Places. Chapel Hill: The University of North Carolina Press. ISBN 9780807812471.
