= Guilford County, North Carolina =

County in North Carolina, United States

- County
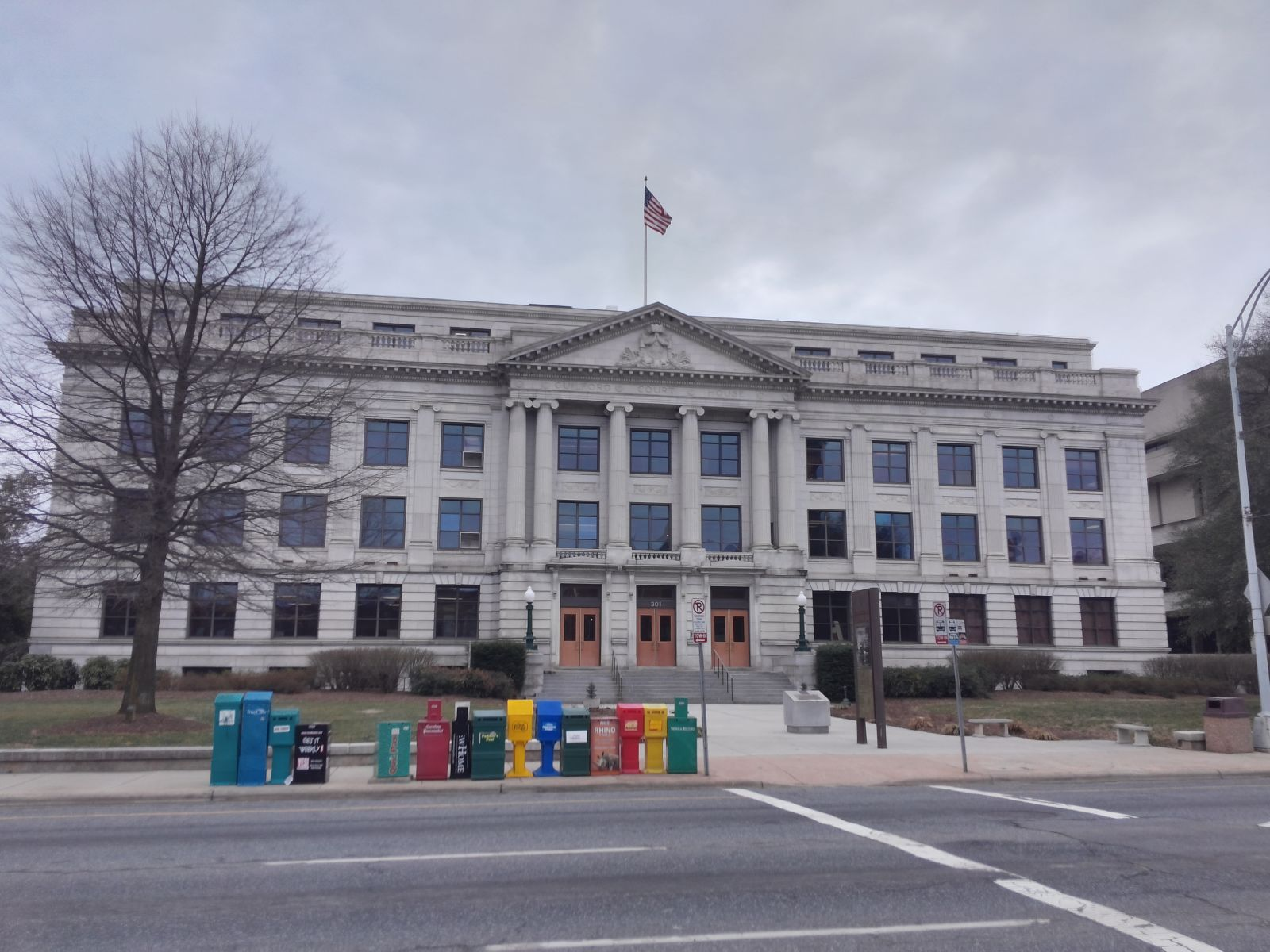
- Old Guilford County Courthouse in Greensboro

- Flag Seal

- Location within the U.S. state of North Carolina
- Interactive map of Guilford County, North Carolina
- Coordinates: 36.08°N 79.79°W
- Country: United States
- State: North Carolina
- Founded: 1771
- Named for: Francis North, 1st Earl of Guilford
- Seat: Greensboro (courthouse also located in High Point)
- Largest community: Greensboro

Area
  - Total: 657.63 sq mi (1,703.3 km^{2})
  - Land: 645.92 sq mi (1,672.9 km^{2})
  - Water: 11.71 sq mi (30.3 km^{2}) 1.78%

Population (2020)
  - Total: 541,299
  - Estimate (2025): 562,234 ▲
  - Density: 838.03/sq mi (323.57/km^{2})
- Time zone: UTC−5 (Eastern)
  - Summer (DST): UTC−4 (EDT)
- Congressional districts: 5th, 6th, 9th
- Website: guilfordcountync.gov

Guilford County is a county located in the U.S. state of North Carolina. As of the 2020 census, the population was 541,299, making it the third-most populous county in North Carolina. The county seat and largest community is Greensboro. Since 1938, an additional county court has been located in High Point. The county was formed in 1771. Guilford County is included in the Greensboro–High Point, NC Metropolitan Statistical Area, which is also included inside the Greensboro–Winston-Salem–High Point, NC Combined Statistical Area.

== History ==
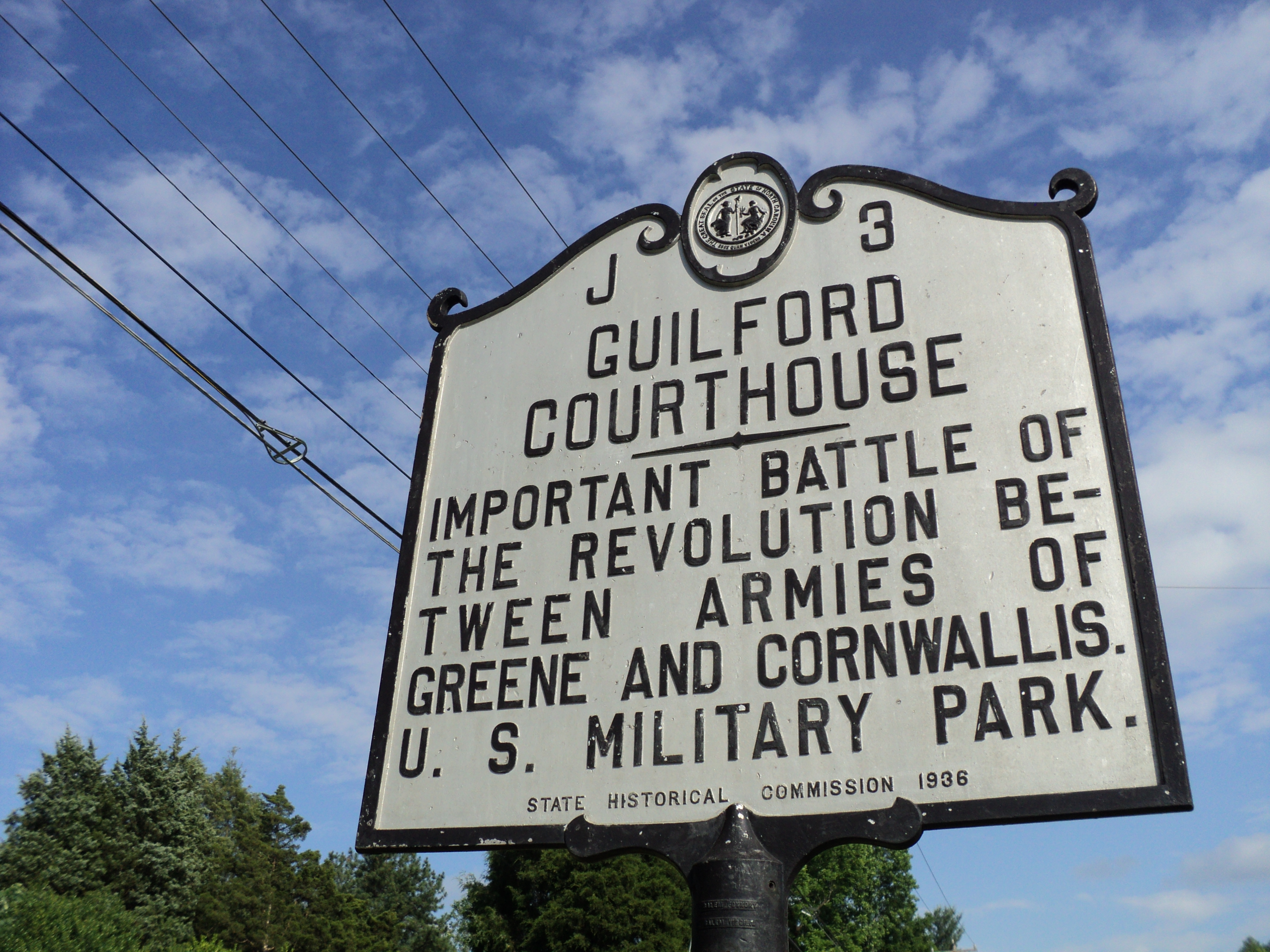
State historical marker for Guilford Courthouse

At the time of European encounter, the inhabitants of the area that became Guilford County were a Native American tribe called the Cheraw. Beginning in the 1740s, settlers arrived in the region in search of fertile and affordable land. These first settlers included American Quakers from Pennsylvania, Maryland, and New England at what is now Greensboro, as well as German Reformed and Lutherans in the east, British Quakers in the south and west, and Scotch-Irish Presbyterians in the center of today's Guilford County. As population increased, the North Carolina colonial legislature organized the county in 1771, from parts of Rowan and Orange counties. It was named for Francis North, Earl of Guilford, father of Frederick North, Lord North, British Prime Minister from 1770 to 1782.

Friedens Church, whose name means "peace" in German, is in eastern Guilford County, at 6001 NC Hwy 61 North, northwest of Gibsonville. It is a historic church established by some of the earliest European settlers in this area. According to a church history, Rev. John Ulrich Giesendanner led his Lutheran congregation from Pennsylvania in 1740 into the part of North Carolina around Haw River, Reedy Fork, Eno River, Alamance Creek, Travis Creek, Beaver Creek, and Deep River. Friedens Church built a log structure in 1745, which the congregation used for 25 years. The second building, completed about 1771, was more substantial and was used for a century, being replaced in May 1871. That third building was destroyed by fire on January 8, 1939, with only the front columns surviving destruction. The church was rebuilt and reopened in May 1939.

The Quaker meeting also played a major role in the European settlement of the county. Numerous Quakers still live in the county. New Garden Friends Meeting, established in 1754 and first affiliated with a Pennsylvania meeting, still operates in Greensboro.

Alamance Presbyterian Church, a log structure, was built in 1762. The congregation was not officially organized until 1764 by the Rev. Henry Patillo, pastor of Hawfields Presbyterian Church. It has operated since then on the same site in present-day Greensboro. According to the church history, the congregation has built five churches on that site and now has its eighteenth pastor.

On March 15, 1781, during the American Revolution (1775–1783), for independence from Great Britain, the Battle of Guilford Court House was fought just north of present-day Greensboro between Generals Charles Cornwallis and Nathanael Greene. This battle marked a turning point in the Revolutionary War in the South. Although General Cornwallis, the British commander, held the field at the end of the battle, his losses were so severe that he decided to withdraw to the Carolina coastline, where he could receive reinforcements from the British Royal Navy at the port in Wilmington and his battered army could be protected by the British naval power. His decision ultimately led him to take his army north into Virginia, leading eventually to his defeat and surrender later in October 1781 at Yorktown, Virginia, after a long siege, by a combined force of American and French Royal troops and blockading French Navy warships on the Chesapeake Bay.

In 1779, the southern third of Guilford County was separated and erected as Randolph County. In 1785, following the American Revolution, the northern half of its remaining territory was organized as Rockingham County.

In 1808, the town of Greensboro replaced the hamlet of Guilford Court House as the county seat. It was more centrally located, making it a better location for travelers of the time.

The county was the site of early industrial development, namely, the Mt. Hecla Cotton Mill, established in 1818 as one of the earliest cotton mills in the state. First run by water power, the mill was refitted to be powered by steam, and was one of the earliest examples in the state of the use of steam power for manufacturing.

In the antebellum era, many of the county's residents were opposed to slavery, including Lutherans, Quakers and Methodists. The county was a stop on the Underground Railroad, for which volunteers aided refugee slaves en route to freedom in the North. People gave them safe places to stay and often food and clothing. Levi Coffin, among the founders of the "railroad," was a Guilford County native. He is credited with personally helping more than 2,000 slaves escape to freedom before the war.

Guilford College was founded in 1837 as the New Garden Boarding School; its name was changed in 1888 when the academic program was expanded considerably. Guilford is the third-oldest coeducational institution in the country and the oldest such institution in the South. Greensboro College, established by the Methodist Church through a charter secured in 1838, was one of the earliest institutions of higher education for women in the United States. It became coeducational in 1954.

In 1873 Bennett College was founded in the basement of the Warnersville Methodist Episcopal Church (now St. Matthew's Methodist Church) with 70 African American male and female students. In 1926, the school became a women-only college, as it continues to be today.

In 1891, Greensboro was selected as the home of a land-grant institution for African Americans, the Agricultural and Mechanical College for the Colored Race, now known as North Carolina Agricultural and Technical State University. It was the nation's second college established under the federal Morrill Act of 1890 and was the first state-supported school for people of color in North Carolina.

Also in 1891, the county became home to the state's first and only publicly supported institution of higher learning for women, the State Normal and Industrial School, established in Greensboro especially to train teachers. In 1932, the school joined with the University of North Carolina at Chapel Hill and North Carolina State University in Raleigh to form the Consolidated University of North Carolina; it was renamed as the Woman's College of the University of North Carolina. From the 1930s to the 1960s, the Woman's College was the third-largest women's university in the world. In 1963, the university was changed to a coed institution, and its curriculum was gradually expanded to include graduate work. It is now known as the University of North Carolina at Greensboro.

Immanuel Lutheran College and Seminary was located on a small campus on East Market Street from 1905 until it closed in 1961. "Lutheran" was founded by white ethnic German Lutherans for black students in 1903 in Concord, at a time when education was racially segregated and blacks had limited access to higher education. When the school moved to the county seat of Greensboro, Lutherans built a large granite main building for it. The school operated a high school, junior college, and seminary under the jurisdiction of the Evangelical Lutheran Synodical Conference of North America.

In 1911, a new county called Piedmont County was proposed, with High Point as its county seat, to be created from Guilford, Davidson and Randolph counties. Many people appeared at the courthouse to oppose the plan, vowing to go to the state legislature to protest. The state legislature voted down the plan in February 1911. The same year, Guilford County became one of the first U.S. counties to have its own public health department.

In 1960 North Carolina still operated by racial segregation laws, and maintained the disenfranchisement of most black voters established at the end of the 19th century to suppress the Republican Party. Following World War II, African-American veterans and young people heightened their activities in the American civil rights movement. Guilford County was the site of an influential protest in 1960 when four black students from the North Carolina A&T State University in Greensboro started an early sit-in. Known afterwards as the Greensboro Four, the four young men sat at a "whites-only" lunch counter at the Woolworth's store in downtown Greensboro and asked to be served after purchasing items in the store. When refused, they asked why their money was good enough for buying retail items, but not food at the counter. They were arrested, but their action led to many other college students in Greensboro – including white students from Guilford and the Women's College – to sit at the lunch counter in a show of support. The students carried on a regular sit-in and within two months, the sit-in movement spread to 54 cities in nine states; Woolworth's eventually agreed to desegregate its lunch counters, and other restaurants in Southern towns and cities followed suit.

A darker racial incident in 1979 was called the Greensboro massacre. In this incident the predominantly African American Communist Workers Party (CWP) led a march protesting the Ku Klux Klan and other white-supremacist groups through a black neighborhood in southeastern Greensboro. They were attacked and shot at by KKK and American Nazi Party members; five of the Communist Party marchers were killed and seven wounded in the attack. In 1980 the case attracted renewed national attention when the six shooter defendants were found "not guilty" by an all-white jury. None of the people involved in this shooting, from either side, was a citizen of Guilford County; they simply chose the county seat of Greensboro as a rallying point. In 1985 families and friends of the victims won a civil case for damages against the city police department and other officials for failure to protect the African Americans; monies were paid to the Greensboro Justice Center.

Guilford County was considered, and more "geographically" designated as an area that is located in the western outskirts of the Eastern Half of North Carolina for several "time periods." Due to the regional shifts in recent years, the county had become more "developed," which resulted in the county being in the overall center of North Carolina, with the Greensboro-High Point area included in the overall center of the state, also cementing the metropolitan area as being one of the largest "hub centers" in the state.

== Geography ==
According to the U.S. Census Bureau, the county has a total area of 657.63 square miles (1,703.3 km^{2}), of which 645.92 square miles (1,672.9 km^{2}) is land and 11.71 square miles (30.3 km^{2}) (1.8%) is water.

The county is drained, in part, by the Deep and Haw rivers.

=== National protected area ===
- Guilford Courthouse National Military Park

=== State and local protected areas/sites ===
- Cascades Preserve (part)
- Charlotte Hawkins Brown Museum
- Company Mill Preserve
- Greensboro Arboretum
- Haw River State Park (part)
- Piedmont Environmental Center
- Rich Fork Preserve (part)

=== Major water bodies ===
- Back Creek
- Beaver Creek
- Belews Lake
- Big Alamance Creek
- Buffalo Creek
- Buffalo Lake
- Deep River
- Haw River
- Hickory Creek
- Lake Brandt
- Lake Higgins
- Lake High Point
- Lake Mackintosh
- Lake Townsend
- Little Alamance Creek
- Mears Fork
- Moores Creek
- North Buffalo Creek
- Old Hollow Lake
- Reddicks Creek
- Reedy Fork
- Rock Creek
- South Buffalo Creek
- West Fork Deep River

=== Adjacent counties ===
- Rockingham County – north
- Alamance County – east
- Randolph County – south
- Davidson County – southwest
- Forsyth County – west
- Stokes County – northwest

=== Major highways ===
- I-40
- I-73
- I-74
- I-85
- Future I-685
- I-785 / Future I-785
- I-840
- US 29
- US 70
- US 158
- US 220
- US 421
- NC 22
- NC 61
- NC 62
- NC 65
- NC 68
- NC 100
- NC 150

=== Major infrastructure ===
- Amtrak Thruway (High Point Station)
- High Point Station
- J. Douglas Galyon Depot (Greensboro Station)
- Piedmont Triad International Airport

== Demographics ==
Historical population
Census	Pop.	Note	%±
1790	7,300		—
1800	9,442		29.3%
1810	11,420		20.9%
1820	14,511		27.1%
1830	18,737		29.1%
1840	19,175		2.3%
1850	19,754		3.0%
1860	20,056		1.5%
1870	21,736		8.4%
1880	23,585		8.5%
1890	28,052		18.9%
1900	39,074		39.3%
1910	60,497		54.8%
1920	79,272		31.0%
1930	133,010		67.8%
1940	153,916		15.7%
1950	191,057		24.1%
1960	246,520		29.0%
1970	288,590		17.1%
1980	317,154		9.9%
1990	347,420		9.5%
2000	421,048		21.2%
2010	488,406		16.0%
2020	541,299		10.8%
2025 (est.)	562,234	▲	3.9%
U.S. Decennial Census; 1790–1960 1900–1990; 1990–2000 2010 2020

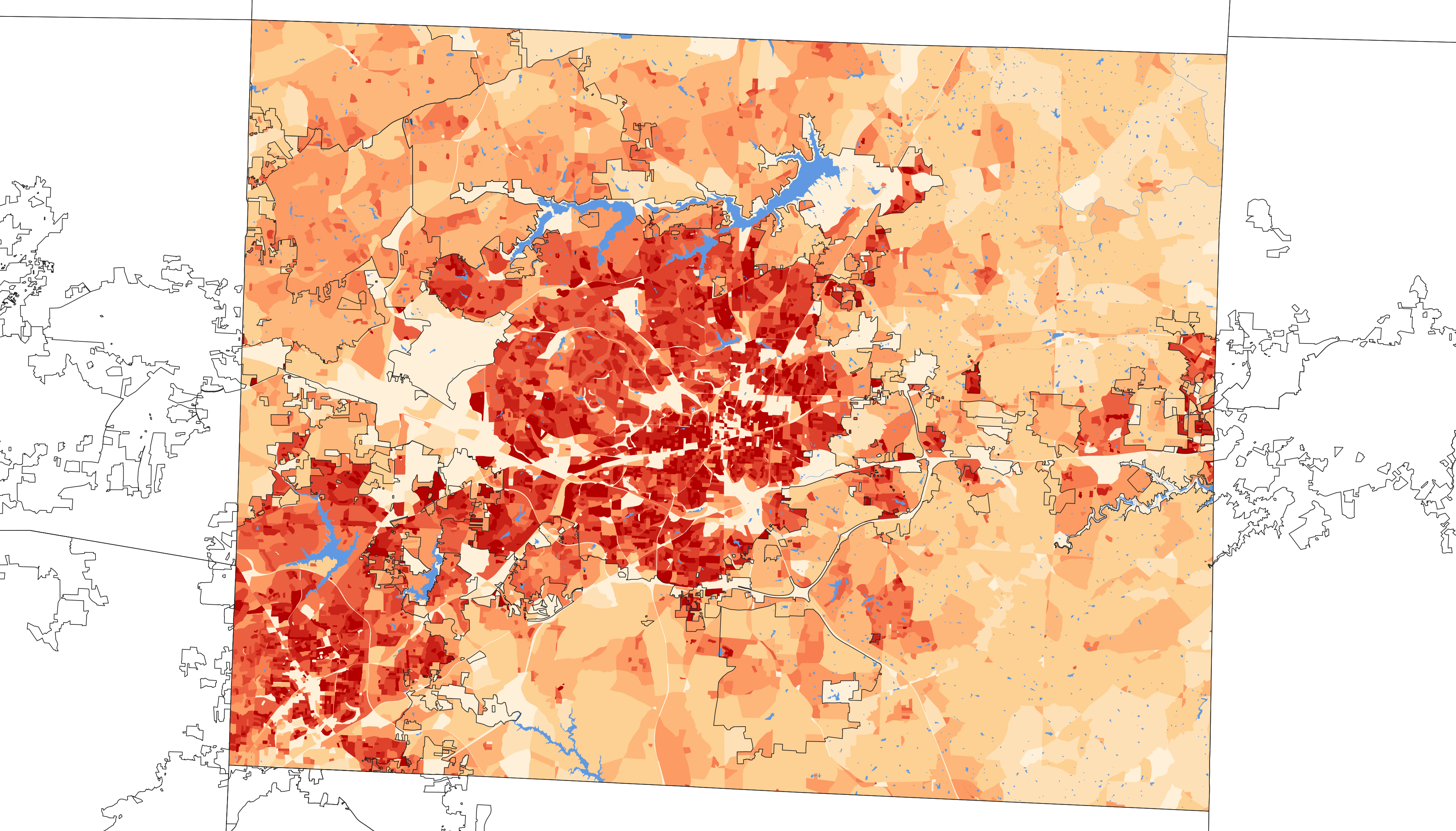
2020 population density of Guilford County NC by census block

=== 2020 census ===
Guilford County, North Carolina – Racial and ethnic composition Note: the US Census treats Hispanic/Latino as an ethnic category. This table excludes Latinos from the racial categories and assigns them to a separate category. Hispanics/Latinos may be of any race.
Race / ethnicity (NH = Non-Hispanic)	Pop 1980	Pop 1990	Pop 2000	Pop 2010	Pop 2020	% 1980	% 1990	% 2000	% 2010	% 2020
White alone (NH)	233,171	247,891	264,847	265,228	255,640	73.52%	71.35%	62.90%	54.30%	47.23%
Black or African American alone (NH)	78,674	91,282	122,279	156,982	179,423	24.81%	26.27%	29.04%	32.14%	33.15%
Native American or Alaska Native alone (NH)	1,348	1,606	1,789	2,071	1,918	0.43%	0.46%	0.42%	0.42%	0.35%
Asian alone (NH)	1,107	3,635	10,211	19,059	28,719	0.35%	1.05%	2.43%	3.90%	5.31%
Native Hawaiian or Pacific Islander alone (NH)	x	x	110	193	216	x	x	0.03%	0.04%	0.04%
Other race alone (NH)	450	119	749	1,123	2,850	0.14%	0.03%	0.18%	0.23%	0.53%
Mixed race or Multiracial (NH)	x	x	5,078	8,924	20,381	x	x	1.21%	1.83%	3.77%
Hispanic or Latino (any race)	2,404	2,887	15,985	34,826	52,152	0.76%	0.83%	3.80%	7.13%	9.63%
Total	317,154	347,420	421,048	488,406	541,299	100.00%	100.00%	100.00%	100.00%	100.00%

Map of census tracts in Guilford County by racial plurality, per the 2020 US Census. Tract 9801, home to PTI, has no population. Legend: | Non-Hispanic White 30–40% 40–50% 50–60% 60–70% 70–80% 80–90% 90%+ Hispanic or Latino 30–40% | Black or African American 20–30% 30–40% 40–50% 50–60% 60–70% 70–80% 80–90% |

As of the 2020 census, there were 541,299 people, 216,022 households, and 132,323 families residing in the county. The median age was 37.6 years, 21.7% of residents were under the age of 18, and 16.1% were 65 years of age or older. For every 100 females there were 89.4 males, and for every 100 females age 18 and over there were 85.8 males age 18 and over.

Of the households, 29.3% had children under the age of 18 living in them, 41.0% were married-couple households, 19.1% were households with a male householder and no spouse or partner present, and 33.5% were households with a female householder and no spouse or partner present. About 31.4% of all households were made up of individuals and 11.4% had someone living alone who was 65 years of age or older.

There were 232,277 housing units, of which 7.0% were vacant. Among occupied housing units, 58.0% were owner-occupied and 42.0% were renter-occupied. The homeowner vacancy rate was 1.3% and the rental vacancy rate was 7.5%.

The racial makeup of the county was 48.7% White, 33.6% Black or African American, 0.6% American Indian and Alaska Native, 5.3% Asian, <0.1% Native Hawaiian and Pacific Islander, 5.3% from some other race, and 6.5% from two or more races. Hispanic or Latino residents of any race comprised 9.6% of the population.

85.8% of residents lived in urban areas, while 14.2% lived in rural areas.

=== 2010 census ===
At the 2010 census, there were 500,879 people, 192,064 households, 63% of which owned their own housing. The population density was 648 people per square mile (250 people/km^{2}). There were 180,391 housing units at an average density of 278 units per square mile (107 units/km^{2}). The racial makeup of the county was 64.53% White, 29.27% Black or African American, 0.46% Native American, 2.44% Asian, 0.03% Pacific Islander, 1.81% from other races, and 1.45% from two or more races. 3.80% of the population were Hispanic or Latino of any race.

There were 168,667 households, out of which 30.40% had children under the age of 18 living with them, 48.00% were married couples living together, 13.40% had a female householder with no husband present, and 34.90% were non-families. 27.90% of all households were made up of individuals, and 8.30% had someone living alone who was 65 years of age or older. The average household size was 2.41 and the average family size was 2.96.

In the county, the population was spread out, with 23.70% under the age of 18, 11.00% from 18 to 24, 31.40% from 25 to 44, 22.10% from 45 to 64, and 11.80% who were 65 years of age or older. The median age was 35 years. For every 100 females, there were 92.00 males. For every 100 females age 18 and over, there were 88.60 males.

The median income for a household in the county was $42,618, and the median income for a family was $52,638. Males had a median income of $35,940 versus $27,092 for females. The per capita income for the county was $23,340. About 7.60% of families and 10.60% of the population were below the poverty line, including 13.80% of those under age 18 and 9.90% of those age 65 or over.

== Government and politics ==
The county is governed by a Board of Commissioners, containing a representative for each of nine districts, with each member serving a four-year term.

Guilford County is a member of the regional Piedmont Triad Council of Governments.

Since 1928 Guilford has been somewhat of a bellwether county. It has voted for the winner of every presidential election but four. The exceptions include 1960, when Richard Nixon carried it despite his loss to John F. Kennedy; 2016, where Hillary Clinton carried the county despite her loss to Donald Trump, and 2024 where Democrat Kamala Harris won the county despite her loss to Donald Trump. It also narrowly voted for Democrat John Kerry in 2004 after having voted for Republican George W. Bush in 2000.

Like most other urban counties around the country, it has voted for Democrats by wide margins in every election since 2004.

United States presidential election results for Guilford County, North Carolina
Year	Republican		Democratic		Third party(ies)	
Year	No.	%	No.	%	No.	%
1880	2,233	49.24%	2,280	50.28%	22	0.49%
1884	2,262	47.72%	2,422	51.10%	56	1.18%
1888	2,721	49.08%	2,462	44.41%	361	6.51%
1892	2,532	42.35%	2,773	46.38%	674	11.27%
1896	3,455	49.33%	3,479	49.67%	70	1.00%
1900	3,296	49.37%	3,335	49.96%	45	0.67%
1904	1,716	38.13%	2,763	61.40%	21	0.47%
1908	2,863	42.36%	3,822	56.56%	73	1.08%
1912	460	7.26%	3,830	60.43%	2,048	32.31%
1916	3,670	44.06%	4,616	55.41%	44	0.53%
1920	7,920	45.17%	9,615	54.83%	0	0.00%
1924	6,822	42.79%	8,804	55.22%	317	1.99%
1928	16,541	62.62%	9,872	37.38%	0	0.00%
1932	9,263	31.88%	19,301	66.42%	495	1.70%
1936	9,514	27.11%	25,579	72.89%	0	0.00%
1940	9,770	26.89%	26,565	73.11%	0	0.00%
1944	12,962	35.55%	23,495	64.45%	0	0.00%
1948	14,167	40.08%	17,224	48.73%	3,958	11.20%
1952	33,310	53.43%	29,028	46.57%	0	0.00%
1956	32,751	59.87%	21,948	40.13%	0	0.00%
1960	41,357	57.57%	30,486	42.43%	0	0.00%
1964	35,635	47.13%	39,969	52.87%	0	0.00%
1968	38,996	46.23%	25,604	30.35%	19,751	23.42%
1972	61,381	69.46%	25,800	29.20%	1,185	1.34%
1976	45,441	49.00%	46,826	50.49%	473	0.51%
1980	53,291	51.93%	44,516	43.38%	4,815	4.69%
1984	73,096	61.25%	46,027	38.57%	213	0.18%
1988	66,060	56.35%	50,351	42.95%	821	0.70%
1992	60,140	41.08%	66,319	45.30%	19,940	13.62%
1996	67,727	45.89%	69,208	46.89%	10,652	7.22%
2000	84,394	50.76%	80,787	48.59%	1,083	0.65%
2004	98,254	49.30%	100,042	50.19%	1,018	0.51%
2008	97,718	40.42%	142,101	58.78%	1,952	0.81%
2012	104,789	41.28%	146,365	57.66%	2,698	1.06%
2016	98,062	38.10%	149,248	57.98%	10,095	3.92%
2020	107,294	37.72%	173,086	60.84%	4,106	1.44%
2024	109,077	38.27%	171,118	60.03%	4,858	1.70%

=== Guilford County Sheriff's Office ===
The Guilford County Sheriff's Office is the law enforcement agency for Guilford County, headquartered in downtown Greensboro. It provides primary law enforcement services for the unincorporated areas of Guilford County and to municipalities that have not established their own police departments. Three district offices provide patrol, investigative and administrative services to county residents.

The Sheriff's Office supplements the Greensboro and High Point city police departments, having full jurisdiction and ability to provide law enforcement services within both municipalities. The Sheriff's Office maintains detention centers in both Greensboro and High Point, and provides security to the state courthouses in both cities. The Sheriff's Office has approximately 750 employees and is the second largest full service sheriff's office in North Carolina.

The Guilford County Sheriff is elected every four years by county wide ballot. Funded by the Guilford County Board of Commissioners, county government provides some administrative support.

== Health and life expectancy ==
Of 3,142 counties in the United States in 2014, the Institute for Health Metrics and Evaluation ranked Guilford County 1,330 in the average life expectancy at birth of male residents and 1,434 in the life expectancy of female residents. Males in Guilford County lived an average of 76.1 years and females lived an average of 80.6 years compared to the national average for life expectancy of 76.7 for males and 81.5 for females. In the 1980-2014 period, the average life expectancy in Guilford County for females increased by 4.0 years, while male life expectancy increased by 6.7 years compared to the national average for the same period of an increased life expectancy of 3.1 years for women and 5.5 years for men.

In 2020, the Robert Wood Johnson Foundation ranked Guilford country as 23rd of 100 ranked counties in North Carolina in "health outcomes," as measured by length and quality of life.

== Communities ==
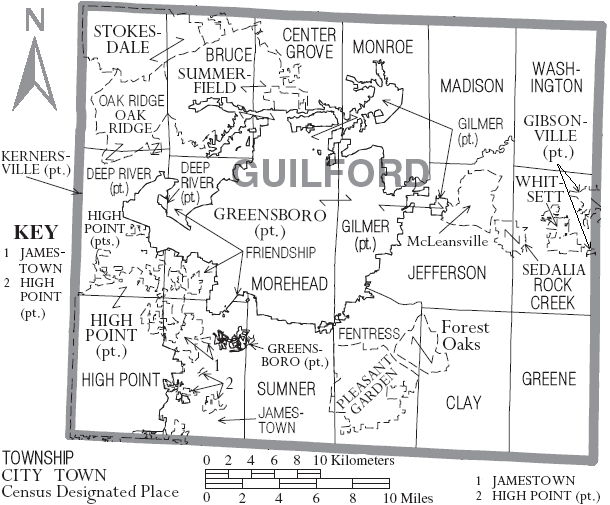
Map of Guilford County with municipal and township labels

=== Cities ===
- Archdale (part)
- Burlington (part)
- Greensboro (county seat and largest community)
- High Point (part)

=== Towns ===
- Gibsonville (part)
- Jamestown
- Kernersville (part)
- Oak Ridge
- Pleasant Garden
- Sedalia
- Stokesdale (part)
- Summerfield
- Whitsett

=== Townships ===
- Bruce
- Center Grove
- Clay
- Deep River
- Fentress
- Friendship
- Gilmer
- Greene
- Jefferson
- Madison
- Monroe
- Morehead
- Oak Ridge
- Rock Creek
- Sumner
- Washington

=== Census-designated places ===
- Forest Oaks
- McLeansville

=== Unincorporated communities ===
- Browns Summit
- Climax
- Colfax
- Ellisboro
- Guilford
- Julian
- Monticello

== Education ==
Guilford County Schools is the sole school district in this county.

== Notable people ==
- Joseph Cannon, 35th speaker of the United States House of Representatives (1903–1911)
- Mike Causey 11th Commissioner of Insurance of North Carolina (2017–)
- Levi Coffin, abolitionist leader who was nicknamed the "President of the Underground Railroad" for helping escaped slaves to freedom in the North before the Civil War
- Dolley Madison, wife of President James Madison and the fourth First Lady of the United States
- Edward R. Murrow, American broadcast journalist
- William Sydney Porter, short-story writer better-known as "O. Henry"; his most famous stories are "The Ransom of Red Chief" and "The Gift of the Magi".
- Ryan Wesley Routh, attempted assassin of Donald Trump in September 2024

== See also ==
- List of counties in North Carolina
- National Register of Historic Places listings in Guilford County, North Carolina
- Haw River Valley AVA, wine region partially located in the county
- Guilford County Schools
- USS Guilford (APA-112)
