= Torsten Rudenschöld =

Swedish educator and social reformer (1798–1859)

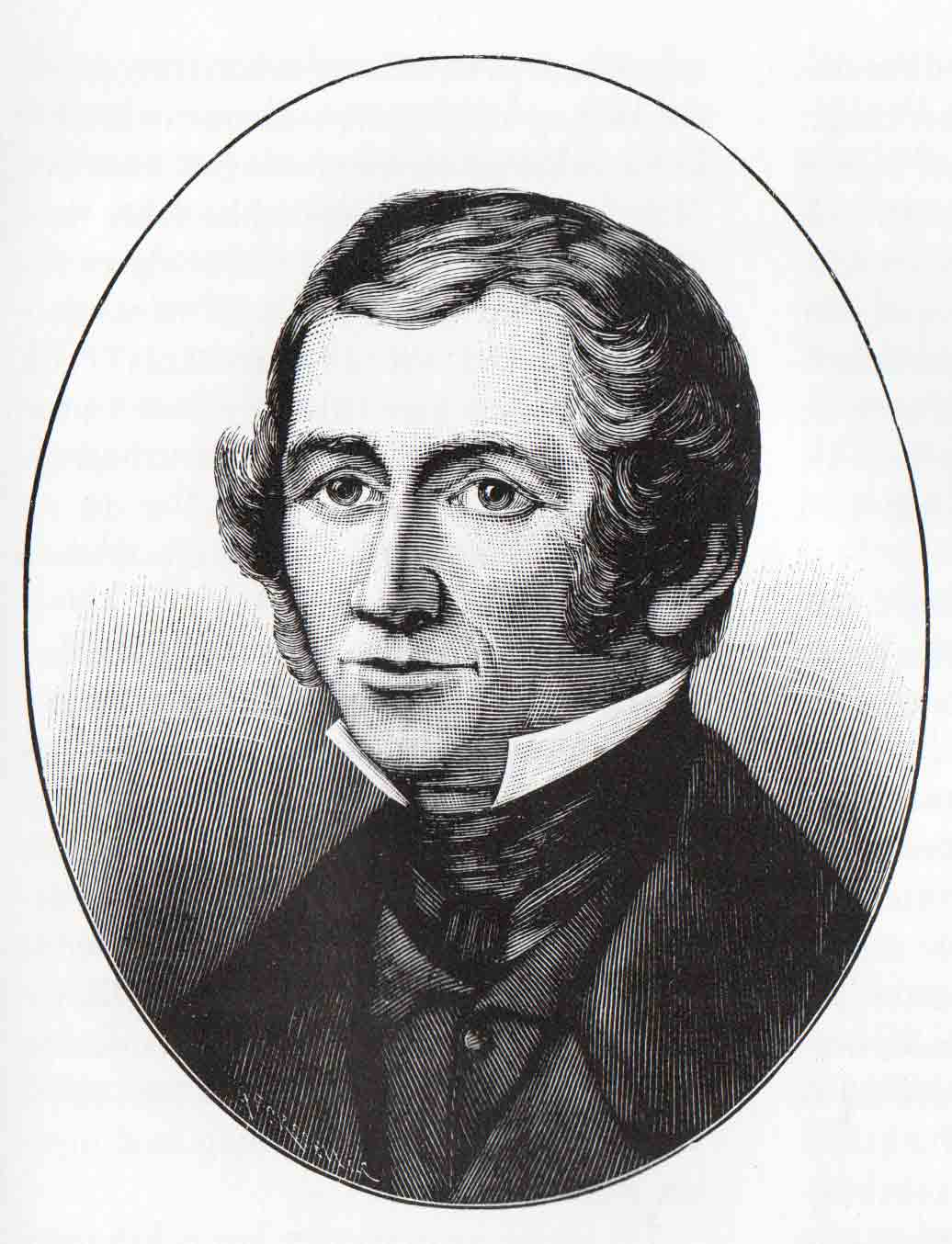
- Rudenschöld, c. 1850
- Born: 30 March 1798
- Died: 27 May 1859 (aged 61)

Torsten Rudenschöld (30 March 1798 – 27 May 1859) was a Swedish educator and social reformer.
