= Louis Schwabe =

Silk manufacturer (1798–1845)

Louis Schwabe (1798-1845) was a manufacturer of silk and artificial silk fabrics in Manchester. He was noted for his pioneering work in the use of spinnerets for the production of an artificial glass based yarn.
