= List of Carolina Hurricanes broadcasters =

== Television ==
=== 2020s ===
Year	Channel	Play-by-play	Color commentator(s)
2025–26	FanDuel Sports Network South	Mike Maniscalco	Tripp Tracy
2025–26	FanDuel Sports Network Southeast	Mike Maniscalco	Tripp Tracy
2024–25	FanDuel Sports Network South	Mike Maniscalco	Tripp Tracy
2024–25	FanDuel Sports Network Southeast	Mike Maniscalco	Tripp Tracy
2023–24	Bally Sports South	Mike Maniscalco	Tripp Tracy
2023–24	Bally Sports Southeast	Mike Maniscalco	Tripp Tracy
2022–23	Bally Sports South	Mike Maniscalco	Tripp Tracy
2022–23	Bally Sports Southeast	Mike Maniscalco	Tripp Tracy
2021–22	Bally Sports South	Mike Maniscalco	Tripp Tracy
2021–22	Bally Sports Southeast	Mike Maniscalco	Tripp Tracy
2020–21	Bally Sports South	Mike Maniscalco	Tripp Tracy
2020–21	Bally Sports Southeast	Mike Maniscalco	Tripp Tracy

=== 2010s ===
Year	Channel	Play-by-play	Color commentator(s)
2019–20	Fox Sports Carolinas	John Forslund (primary); Mike Maniscalco (during Forslund's NHL on NBC assignments)	Tripp Tracy
2018–19	Fox Sports Carolinas	John Forslund (primary); Mike Maniscalco (select games during Forslund's NHL on NBC assignments); Jason Shaya (select games during Forslund's NHL on NBC assignments)	Tripp Tracy
2017–18	Fox Sports Carolinas	John Forslund (primary); JP Dellacamera (during Forslund's NHL on NBC assignments)	Tripp Tracy
2016–17	Fox Sports Carolinas	John Forslund (primary); JP Dellacamera (during Forslund's NHL on NBC assignments)	Tripp Tracy
2015–16	Fox Sports Carolinas	John Forslund	Tripp Tracy
2014–15	Fox Sports Carolinas	John Forslund	Tripp Tracy
2013–14	Fox Sports Carolinas	John Forslund	Tripp Tracy
2012–13	Fox Sports Carolinas	John Forslund	Tripp Tracy
2011–12	Fox Sports Carolinas	John Forslund	Tripp Tracy
2010–11	Fox Sports Carolinas	John Forslund	Tripp Tracy

=== 2000s ===
Year	Channel	Play-by-play	Color commentator(s)
2009–10	Fox Sports Carolinas	John Forslund	Tripp Tracy
2008–09	Fox Sports Carolinas	John Forslund	Tripp Tracy
2007–08	FSN South	John Forslund	Tripp Tracy
2006–07	FSN South	John Forslund	Tripp Tracy
2005–06	FSN South	John Forslund	Tripp Tracy
2003–04	Fox Sports Net South	John Forslund	Tripp Tracy
2003–04	WRAZ	John Forslund	Tripp Tracy
2002–03	Fox Sports Net South	John Forslund	Tripp Tracy
2002–03	WRAZ	John Forslund	Tripp Tracy
2001–02	Fox Sports Net South	John Forslund	Tripp Tracy
2001–02	WRAZ	John Forslund	Tripp Tracy
2000–01	Fox Sports Net South	John Forslund	Tripp Tracy
2000–01	WRAZ	John Forslund	Tripp Tracy

=== 1990s ===
Year	Channel	Play-by-play	Color commentator(s)
1999–2000	Fox Sports South	John Forslund	Tripp Tracy
1999–2000	WRAZ	John Forslund	Tripp Tracy
1998–99	Fox Sports South	John Forslund	Tripp Tracy
1997–98	Fox Sports South	John Forslund	Bill Gardner
1997–98	WRAL-TV	John Forslund	Bill Gardner
1997–98	WRAZ	John Forslund	Bill Gardner

== Radio ==
=== 2020s ===
Year	Channel	Play-by-play	Color commentator(s)				
2022–23	WCMC-FM	Mike Maniscalco	Tripp Tracy				
2022–23	WCMC-FM	Mike Maniscalco	Tripp Tracy	2021–22	WCMC-FM	Mike Maniscalco	Tripp Tracy
2020–21	WCMC-FM	Mike Maniscalco	Tripp Tracy	2021–22	WCMC-FM	Mike Maniscalco	Tripp Tracy

=== 2010s ===
Year	Flagship Station	Play-by-play	Color commentator(s)
2019–20	WCMC-FM	John Forslund (primary); Mike Maniscalco (during Forslund's NHL on NBC assignments)	Tripp Tracy
2018–19	WCMC-FM	John Forslund (primary); Mike Maniscalco (select games during Forslund's NHL on NBC assignments); Jason Shaya (select games during Forslund's NHL on NBC assignments)	Tripp Tracy
2017–18	WCMC-FM	Chuck Kaiton	
2016–17	WCMC-FM	Chuck Kaiton	
2015–16	WCMC-FM	Chuck Kaiton	
2014–15	WCMC-FM	Chuck Kaiton	
2013–14	WCMC-FM	Chuck Kaiton	
2012–13	WCMC-FM	Chuck Kaiton	
2011–12	WCMC-FM	Chuck Kaiton	
2010–11	WCMC-FM	Chuck Kaiton	

=== 2000s ===
Year	Flagship Station	Play-by-play
2009–10	WCMC-FM	Chuck Kaiton
2008–09	WCMC-FM	Chuck Kaiton
2007–08	WCMC-FM	Chuck Kaiton
2006–07	WBBB	Chuck Kaiton
2005–06	WBBB	Chuck Kaiton
2003–04	WRBZ	Chuck Kaiton
2002–03	WRBZ	Chuck Kaiton
2001–02	WRBZ	Chuck Kaiton
2000–01	WRBZ	Chuck Kaiton

=== 1990s ===
Year	Flagship Station	Play-by-play
1999–2000	WRBZ	Chuck Kaiton
1998–99	WRBZ	Chuck Kaiton
1997–98	WPTF	Chuck Kaiton

== See also ==
- List of Hartford Whalers broadcasters
