= Simulcast =

Broadcasting the same content over multiple mediums

Simulcast (a portmanteau of "simultaneous broadcast") is the broadcasting of programs or events across more than one resolution, bitrate or medium, or more than one service on the same medium, at exactly the same time (that is, simultaneously). For example, BBC Radio 4 is simulcast on both FM and DAB. Likewise, the BBC's Prom concerts were formerly simulcast on both BBC Radio 3 and BBC Television. Another application is the transmission of the original-language soundtrack of movies or TV series over local or Internet radio, with the television broadcast having been dubbed into a local language. Yet another is when a sports game, such as Super Bowl LVIII, is simulcast on multiple television networks at the same time. In the case of Super Bowl LVIII, the game's main broadcast channel was CBS, but viewers could watch it on other CBS-owned television channels or streaming services as well; Nickelodeon and Paramount+ showed the English-language broadcast, while Univision showed the same visual but had Spanish-language broadcasters for its audio.

== Early radio simulcasts ==
Before launching stereo radio, experiments were conducted by transmitting left and right channels on different radio channels. The earliest record found was a broadcast by the BBC in 1926 of a Halle Orchestra concert from Manchester, using the wavelengths of the regional stations and Daventry.

In its earliest days, the BBC often transmitted the same programme on the "National Service" and the "Regional Network".

An early use of the word "simulcast" is from 1925.

Between 1990 and 1994, the BBC broadcast a channel of entertainment (Radio 5) which offered a wide range of simulcasts, taking programmes from the BBC World Service and Radio 1, 2, 3 and 4 for simultaneous broadcast.

== Simulcasting to provide stereo sound for TV broadcasts ==
Before stereo TV sound transmission was possible, simulcasting on TV and radio was a method of effectively transmitting "stereo" sound to music TV broadcasts. Typically, an FM frequency in the broadcast area for viewers to tune their stereo systems to would be displayed on the screen. The band Grateful Dead and their concert "Great Canadian Train Ride" in 1970 was the first TV broadcast of a live concert with FM simulcast. In the 1970s WPXI in Pittsburgh broadcast a live Boz Scaggs performance which had the audio simultaneously broadcast on two FM radio stations to create a quadrophonic sound, the first of its kind. The first such transmission in the United Kingdom was on 14 November 1972, when the BBC broadcast a live classical concert from the Royal Albert Hall on both BBC2 and Radio 3. The first pop/rock simulcast was almost two years later, a recording of Van Morrison's London Rainbow Concert simultaneously on BBC2 TV and Radio 2 (see It's Too Late to Stop Now) on 27 May 1974.

Similarly, in the 1980s, before Multichannel Television Sound or home theater was commonplace in American households, broadcasters would air a high fidelity version of a television program's audio portion over FM stereo simultaneous with the television broadcast. PBS stations were the most likely to use this technique, especially when airing a live concert. It was also a way of allowing MTV and similar music channels to run stereo sound through the cable-TV network. This method required a stereo FM transmitter modulating MTV's stereo soundtrack through the cable-TV network, and customers connecting their FM receiver's antenna input to the cable-TV outlet. They would then tune the FM receiver to the specified frequency that would be published in documentation supplied by the cable-TV provider.

With the introduction of commercial FM stations in Australia in July 1980, commercial TV channels began simulcasting some music based programs with the new commercial FM stations and continued to do so into the early 1990s. These were initially rock based programs, such as late night music video shows and rock concerts, but later included some major rock musicals such as The Rocky Horror Picture Show and The Blues Brothers when they first aired on TV. During the mid-1980s the final Australian concert of several major rock artists such as Dire Straits were simulcast live on a commercial TV and FM station. The ABC also simulcast some programs on ABC Television and ABC FM, including the final concert of Elton John with the Melbourne Symphony Orchestra.

In South Africa, the SABC radio station Radio 2000 was established in 1986 to simulcast SABC 1 programming, especially imported American and British television shows, in their original English, before South Africa adopted a stereo standard which allowed secondary audio tracks through the television spectrum.

The first cable TV concert simulcast was Frank Zappa's Halloween show (31 October 1981), live from NYC's Palladium and shown on MTV with the audio-only portion simulcast over FM's new "Starfleet Radio" network. Engineered by Mark G. Pinske with the UMRK mobile recording truck. A later, notable application for simulcasting in this context was the Live Aid benefit concert that was broadcast around the world on 13 July 1985. Most destinations where this concert was broadcast had the concert simulcast by at least one TV network and at least one of the local FM stations.

Most stereo-capable video recorders made through the 1980s and early 1990s had a "simulcast" recording mode where they recorded video signals from the built-in TV tuner and audio signals from the VCR's audio line-in connectors. This was to allow one to connect a stereo FM tuner that is tuned to the simulcast frequency to the VCR's audio input in order to record the stereo sound of a TV program that would otherwise be recorded in mono. The function was primarily necessary with stereo VCRs that didn't have a stereo TV tuner or were operated in areas where stereo TV broadcasting wasn't in place. This was typically selected through the user setting the input selector to "Simulcast" or "Radio" mode or, in the case of some JVC units, the user setting another "audio input" switch from "TV" or "Tuner" to "Line".

In the mid to late 1990s, video game developer Nintendo utilized simulcasting to provide enhanced orchestral scoring and voice-acting for the first ever "integrated radio-games" – its Satellaview video games. Whereas digital game data was broadcast to the Satellaview unit to provide the basic game and game sounds, Nintendo's partner, satellite radio company St.GIGA, simultaneously broadcast the musical and vocal portion of the game via radio. These two streams were combined at the Satellaview to provide a unified audiotrack analogous to stereo.

== Other uses ==
The term "simulcast" (describing simultaneous radio/television broadcast) was coined in 1948 by a press agent at WCAU-TV, Philadelphia. NBC and CBS had begun broadcasting a few programs both to their established nationwide radio audience and to the much smaller—though steadily-growing—television audience. NBC's "Voice of Firestone" is sometimes mentioned in this regard, but NBC's "Voice of Firestone Televues" program, reaching a small Eastern audience beginning in 1943, was a TV-only show, distinct from the radio "Voice of Firestone" broadcasts. Actual TV-AM radio simulcasts of the very same "Voice of Firestone" program began only on 5 September 1949. A documented candidate for first true simulcast may well be NBC's "We the People." Toscanini's NBC Symphony performance of 15 March 1952 is perhaps a first instance of radio/TV simulcasting of a concert, predating the much-heralded rock concert simulcasts beginning in the 1980s. It could, however, be argued that these Toscanini presentations—with admission controlled by NBC, as with all its programming—were no more "public concerts" than NBC's "Voice of Firestone" broadcasts beginning in 1949, or its "Band of America" programs, which were simulcast starting 17 October 1949. Likewise Toscanini's simulcast NBC presentation of two acts of Verdi's "Aida" on 3 April 1949.

Presently, in the United States, simulcast most often refers to the practice of offering the same programming on an FM and AM station owned by the same entity, in order to cut costs. With the advent of solid state AM transmitters and computers, it has become very easy for AM stations to broadcast a different format without additional cost; therefore, simulcast between FM/AM combinations are rarely heard today outside of rural areas, and in urban areas, where often the talk radio, sports radio, or all-news radio format of an AM station is simulcast on FM, mainly for the convenience of listeners in office buildings in urban cores which easily block AM signals, as well as those with FM-only tuners. In another case, popular programs will be aired simultaneously on different services in adjacent countries, such as animated sitcom The Simpsons, airing Sunday evenings at 8:00 p.m. (Eastern and Pacific times) on both Fox in the United States and Global (1989 to 2018) and Citytv (2018 to 2021) in Canada and entertainment show Ant & Dec's Saturday Night Takeaway, airing Saturday nights at various times between 7:00 pm and 7:30 pm on ITV in the United Kingdom and Virgin Media One in the Republic of Ireland.

During apartheid in South Africa, many foreign programmes on SABC television were dubbed in Afrikaans. The original soundtrack, usually in English, but sometimes in German or Dutch was available on the Radio 2000 service. This could be selected using a button labeled simulcast on many televisions manufactured before 1995.

Radio programs have been simulcast on television since the invention thereof however, as of recent, perhaps the most visible example of radio shows on television is The Howard Stern Show, which currently airs on Sirius Satellite Radio as well as Howard TV. Another prominent radio show that was simulcast on television is Imus in the Morning, which until the simulcast ended in 2015, aired throughout the years on MSNBC, RFD-TV and Fox Business Network, in addition to its radio broadcast distributed by Citadel Media. Multiple sports talk radio shows, including Mike & Mike, The Herd with Colin Cowherd and Boomer and Carton also are carried on television, saving those networks the burden of having to air encores of sporting events or other paid sports programming which may draw lower audiences. In New Zealand, breakfast programme The AM Show airs on television channel Three and was simulcast on radio station Magic Talk; both networks were owned and operated by MediaWorks New Zealand until December 2020, when Three was sold to Discovery, Inc. In 2022, the programme was rebranded as AM and ceased simulcasting on Magic Talk, becoming a TV-only format.

Following the acquisition of the assets of the professional wrestling promotion World Championship Wrestling (WCW) by the rival World Wrestling Federation (WWF), a segment simulcast between their two flagship programs—WCW Monday Nitro on TNT (which was airing its series finale from Panama City) and the WWF's Raw on TNN (from Cleveland)—on March 26, 2001, featured WWF owner Vince McMahon addressing the sale, only for his son Shane McMahon to reveal in-universe that he had bought WCW instead, setting up an "Invasion" storyline to begin integrating WCW talent and championships into WWF.

It is not uncommon for broadcasters to simulcast a particular program (such as a marquee event or special) across all of their networks as a "roadblock" in an effort to maximize ratings by preventing self-cannibalizing counterprogramming; for example, Paramount Global (and corporate predecessor Viacom) has simulcast award shows produced by its flagship properties across its cable channels, such as the MTV Video Music Awards and Nickelodeon Kids' Choice Awards. Certain events—particularly major charity appeals (such as Hope for Haiti Now and Stand Up to Cancer)—may be jointly simulcast by a consortium of networks in order to ensure a wide audience.

=== Simulcasting of sporting events ===
In sports, such as American football and baseball, simulcasts are when a single announcer broadcasts play-by-play coverage both over television and radio. The practice was common in the early years of television, but since the 1980s, most teams have used a separate team for television and for radio. In the National Hockey League, three teams currently use a simulcast:

- The Buffalo Sabres, with play-by-play announcer Dan Dunleavy and analyst Rob Ray via MSG Western New York
- The Carolina Hurricanes, with play-by-play announcer Mike Maniscalco and analyst Tripp Tracy via FanDuel Sports Network South
- The Dallas Stars, with play-by-play announcer Josh Bogorad and analyst Daryl Reaugh via Victory+

Al McCoy (Phoenix), Chick Hearn (Los Angeles), Kevin Calabro (Seattle) and Rod Hundley (Utah) were the last National Basketball Association team broadcasters to be simulcast. Until his retirement in 2016, the first three innings of Vin Scully's commentary for Los Angeles Dodgers home and NL West road games were simulcast on radio and television, with the remainder of the game called by Scully exclusively for television viewers. For the final game before his retirement, Scully's commentary was simulcast on the radio for the entirety of the game.

In the 2021 season, the Toronto Blue Jays broadcast the audio of the Sportsnet play-by-play with Dan Shulman (who has previously been a radio voice for MLB on ESPN Radio) and Buck Martinez over their radio network in what was stated to be a COVID-19-related measure. Media outlets disputed the decision and felt it was actually a cost-cutting move by Blue Jays and Sportsnet owner Rogers Communications, as the team had maintained dedicated radio broadcasts in 2020 with a remote crew.

As all NFL television broadcasts are done by the national networks or via cable, there are no regular TV-to-radio football simulcasts. In order to ensure that all of a particular team's games are available on free-to-air television in their home market, NFL rules require that games not aired by a broadcast television network (including cable networks and streaming platforms) be simulcast on a broadcast station in the main market of each participating team.

In greyhound racing and horse racing, a simulcast is a broadcast of a greyhound or horse race which allows wagering at two or more sites; the simulcast often involves the transmission of wagering information to a central site, so that all bettors may bet in the same betting pool, as well as the broadcast of the race, or bet from home as they watch on a network such as TVG Network or the Racetrack Television Network.

The regional sports network MASN previously used simulcasts for MLB games played between the Baltimore Orioles and Washington Nationals—regional rivals who share the same market and broadcaster. MASN and MASN2 simulcast a single feed of the games with a commentary team featuring personalities from both teams, featuring Jim Hunter and Bob Carpenter alternating play-by-play duties, and the teams' color commentators. This arrangement ended in 2014, with both channels now originating their own Orioles- and Nationals-specific telecasts as normal.

A more recent trend by sports broadcasts have been alternate feeds offering different viewing options, including specialty camera angles, alternative commentary, or enhanced in-game statistics and analysis. In 2021, ESPN introduced a simulcast of selected Monday Night Football games featuring Eli and Peyton Manning, joined by celebrity guests; the success of these broadcasts prompted ESPN to extend the format to other sports, with the Mannings' production company Omaha Productions being involved in some of these broadcasts.

=== Distribution of channels ===
On cable television systems, analog-digital simulcasting (ADS) means that analog channels are duplicated as digital subchannels. Digital tuners are programmed to use the digital subchannel instead of the analog. This allows for smaller, cheaper cable boxes by eliminating the analog tuner and some analog circuitry. On DVRs, it eliminates the need for an MPEG encoder to convert the analog signal to digital for recording. The primary advantage is the elimination of interference, and as analog channels are dropped, the ability to put 10 or more SDTV (or two HDTV, or various other combinations) channels in its place. The primary drawback is the common problem of over-compression (quantity over quality) resulting in fuzzy pictures and pixelation.

Multiplexing—also sometimes called "multicasting"—is something of a reversal of this situation, where multiple program streams are combined into a single broadcast. The two terms are sometimes confused.

In universities with multiple campuses, simulcasting may be used for a single teacher to teach class to students in two or more locations at the same time, using videoconferencing equipment.

In many public safety agencies, simulcast refers to the broadcasting of the same transmission on the same frequency from multiple towers either simultaneously, or offset by a fixed number of microseconds. This allows for a larger coverage area without the need for a large number of channels, resulting in increased spectral efficiency. This comes at the cost of overall poorer voice quality, as multiple sources increase multipath interference significantly, resulting in what is called simulcast distortion.

== See also ==
- Single Channel Simulcast
- Digital distribution, Video on demand and Streaming media: In English language anime distribution, the word "simulcast" is often misused to refer to the online release of a Japanese animated television series during the same period as in Japan.
