= List of Hartford Whalers broadcasters =

Games played by the Hartford Whalers, a professional ice hockey team in Hartford, Connecticut that played in the World Hockey Association (WHA) from 1972 until 1979, and in the National Hockey League (NHL) from 1979 to 1997, were broadcast by several radio and television channels. The Whalers moved to North Carolina in 1997, becoming the Carolina Hurricanes.

== Television ==
=== 1990s ===
Year	Channel	Play-by-play	Color commentator	Studio host
1996–97	SportsChannel New England	John Forslund	Bill Gardner	
1996–97	WBNE	John Forslund	Bill Gardner	
1995–96	SportsChannel New England	John Forslund	Daryl Reaugh	
1995–96	WTVU	John Forslund	Daryl Reaugh	
1994–95	SportsChannel New England	Rick Peckham	Gerry Cheevers	Bob Picozzi
1994–95	WTNH	John Forslund	Gerry Cheevers	Bob Picozzi
1993–94	SportsChannel New England	Rick Peckham	Gerry Cheevers	
1992–93	SportsChannel New England	Rick Peckham	Gerry Cheevers	
1991–92	SportsChannel New England	Rick Peckham	Gerry Cheevers	
1990–91	SportsChannel New England	Rick Peckham	Gerry Cheevers	Billy Gonillo
1990–91	WTXX	Rick Peckham	Gerry Cheevers	Billy Gonillo

=== 1980s ===
Year	Channel	Play-by-play	Color commentator
1989–90	SportsChannel New England	Rick Peckham	Gerry Cheevers
1989–90	WHCT-TV	Rick Peckham	Gerry Cheevers
1988–89	SportsChannel New England	Rick Peckham	Gerry Cheevers
1988–89	WHCT-TV	Rick Peckham	Gerry Cheevers
1987–88	SportsChannel New England	Rick Peckham	Gerry Cheevers
1987–88	WHCT-TV	Rick Peckham	Gerry Cheevers
1986–87	SportsChannel New England	Rick Peckham	Gerry Cheevers
1986–87	WHCT-TV	Rick Peckham	Gerry Cheevers
1985–86	SportsChannel New England	Rick Peckham	Gerry Cheevers and Don Blackburn
1985–86	WVIT	Rick Peckham	Gerry Cheevers and Don Blackburn
1984–85	SportsChannel New England	Rick Peckham	Don Blackburn
1984–85	WVIT	Rick Peckham	Don Blackburn
1983–84	SportsChannel New England	Mike Fornes	Don Blackburn
1983–84	WVIT	Mike Fornes	Don Blackburn
1982–83	PRISM New England	Mike Fornes	Johnny McKenzie
1982–83	WVIT	Scott Wahle	Johnny McKenzie
1981–82	PRISM New England	Mike Fornes	Johnny McKenzie
1981–82	WVIT	Scott Wahle	Johnny McKenzie
1980–81	WVIT	Scott Wahle	Larry Pleau or André Lacroix 1

=== 1970s ===
Year	Channel	Play-by-play	Color commentator(s)
1979–80	WVIT	Scott Wahle	John Hewig or Larry Pleau
1978–79	WHCT-TV	Bob Neumeier	John Hewig
1977–78	WHCT-TV	Bob Neumeier	Dennis Randall
1976–77	WFSB-TV	Bob Neumeier	Bill Rasmussen
1975–76	WFSB-TV; Connecticut Public Television	Bob Neumeier	Bill Rasmussen
1974–75	WFSB-TV	John Carlson	
1973–74	WKBG-TV	John Carlson	Stan Fischler or Shirley Fischler
1972–73	WKBG-TV	John Carlson	Tim Horgan

== Radio ==
=== 1990s ===
Year	Flagship station	Play-by-play	Color commentator(s)
1996–97	WTIC	Chuck Kaiton	Gerry McDonald
1995–96	WTIC	Chuck Kaiton	Marty Howe
1994–95	WTIC	Chuck Kaiton	John Forslund
1993–94	WTIC	Chuck Kaiton	John Forslund
1992–93	WTIC	Chuck Kaiton	Arnold Dean
1991–92	WTIC	Chuck Kaiton	Arnold Dean
1990–91	WTIC	Chuck Kaiton	Gerry Swain or Tom Rowe

=== 1980s ===
Year	Flagship station	Play-by-play	Color commentator(s)
1989–90	WTIC	Chuck Kaiton	André Lacroix
1988–89	WTIC	Chuck Kaiton	André Lacroix
1987–88	WTIC	Chuck Kaiton	André Lacroix
1986–87	WTIC	Chuck Kaiton	André Lacroix
1985–86	WTIC	Chuck Kaiton	André Lacroix
1984–85	WTIC	Chuck Kaiton	André Lacroix
1983–84	WTIC	Chuck Kaiton	André Lacroix
1982–83	WTIC	Chuck Kaiton	André Lacroix
1981–82	WTIC	Chuck Kaiton	André Lacroix
1980–81	WTIC	Chuck Kaiton	Larry Pleau or André Lacroix 1 (Non-televised games)

=== 1970s ===
Year	Flagship station	Play-by-play	Color commentator(s)
1979–80	WTIC	Chuck Kaiton	John Hewig or Larry Pleau
1978–79	WTIC	Bob Neumeier	John Hewig
1977–78	WTIC	Bob Neumeier	Dennis Randall
1976–77	WTIC	Bob Neumeier	Bill Rasmussen
1975–76	WTIC	Bob Neumeier	Bill Rasmussen
1974–75	WTIC	Bill Rasmussen	Ron Ryan
1973–74	WHDH	John Moynihan	
1972–73	WHDH	Dave Martin	

== Notes ==
- 1 André Lacroix replaced Larry Pleau as color commentator during the 1980–81 season when Pleau, who was also an assistant coach, became head coach of the Whalers.
