= Fox Sports Carolinas =

Defunct regional sports television network

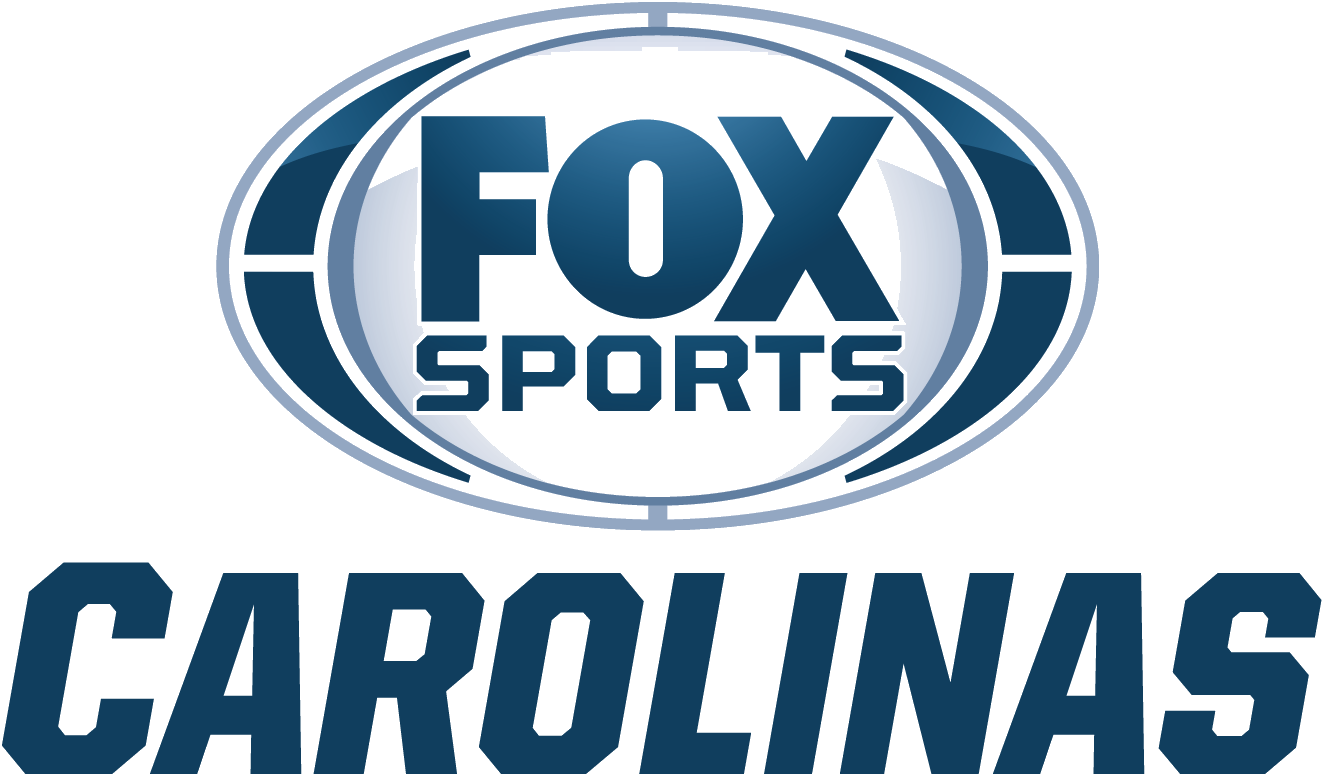
- Type: Regional sports network
- Country: United States
- Broadcast area: North Carolina; South Carolina
- Network: Fox Sports Networks
- Headquarters: Charlotte, North Carolina

Programming
- Language: English
- Picture format: 720p (HDTV); 480i (SDTV)

Ownership
- Sister channels: Fox Sports South; Fox Sports Southeast; Fox Sports Tennessee

History
- Launched: October 31, 2008
- Replaced: Fox Sport South (within designated market)
- Closed: March 31, 2021

Fox Sports Carolinas (FSCAR) was an American regional sports network operated as an affiliate of Fox Sports Networks. The channel was headquartered in Charlotte, North Carolina.

The channel broadcast professional, collegiate and high school sports events, with a primary focus on North Carolina–based teams, namely the Charlotte Hornets and Carolina Hurricanes. It was available on most cable providers in North and South Carolina, with an estimated reach of four million cable television subscribers; Fox Sports Carolinas was also available nationwide on satellite providers DirecTV and Dish Network.

The network closed down on March 31, 2021. Its content was merged into the schedules of the newly named Bally Sports South and Bally Sports Southeast.

== History ==
Fox Sports Carolinas launched on October 31, 2008, and was created through the separation of Fox Sports South into three regional feeds: the main Fox Sports South channel (originating from Atlanta), Fox Sports Carolinas and Fox Sports Tennessee.

In 2019, Diamond Sports Group purchased Fox Sports Carolinas along with the other 20 Fox Sports Networks and in 2020 a partnership with Bally's Corporation was formed to rebrand the networks as "Bally Sports". On January 27, 2021, Bally's and Sinclair issued a joint press release unveiling the new logos for the rebrand of the networks that will occur at a still undetermined date later in 2021. It also was announced that the Fox Sports Carolinas feed would be shut down at that time; its programming will be merged into the new Bally Sports South (previously Fox Sports South) and Bally Sports Southeast (previously Fox Sports Southeast).

== Programming ==
The channel held the regional cable television rights to the Charlotte Hornets of the NBA and Carolina Hurricanes of the NHL; it also carried team-related programs from the Carolina Panthers NFL franchise, and broadcast games and team and collegiate programs from the Atlantic Coast Conference (ACC) and Southeastern Conferences (SEC). Fox Sports Carolinas also broadcast Major League Baseball from two of its sister regional networks. It carried Fox Sports South telecasts of Atlanta Braves games in all of South Carolina, and portions of the Charlotte and Piedmont Triad markets; and Fox Sports Ohio telecasts of Cincinnati Reds games in and around Asheville, Charlotte and Winston-Salem.

== Fox Sports Carolinas HD ==
Fox Sports Carolinas HD was a high definition simulcast feed of Fox Sports Carolinas, which airs most Charlotte Hornets and Carolina Hurricanes games (including tape-delayed late-night replays) and events telecast nationally throughout the Fox Sports Networks in the 720p format. Fox Sports Carolinas HD originally transmitted only during game telecasts (with a test pattern being shown at other times) until July 2009, when it was converted into a 24-hour channel.

== Commentators ==
=== Carolina Hurricanes ===
- Mike Maniscalco - play-by-play announcer
- Tripp Tracy - analyst
- Abby Labar - Hurricanes LIVE host / in-game reporter
- Shane Willis - Hurricanes LIVE analyst

=== Charlotte Hornets ===
- Eric Collins – play-by-play announcer
- Dell Curry – analyst
- Ashley ShahAhmadi – sideline reporter / Hornets LIVE host
- Gerald Henderson Hornets Live analyst
