= FanDuel Sports Network South =

American regional sports network

- Type: Regional sports network
- Country: United States
- Broadcast area: Alabama; Georgia; Kentucky; Mississippi; North Carolina; South Carolina; Tennessee; Nationwide (via satellite)
- Network: FanDuel Sports Network
- Headquarters: Atlanta, Georgia

Programming
- Language: English
- Picture format: 720p (HDTV); 480i (SDTV)

Ownership
- Owner: Main Street Sports Group
- Sister channels: FanDuel Sports Network Southeast

History
- Launched: August 29, 1990 (36 years ago)
- Closed: September 30, 2026 (11 days ago)
- Former names: SportSouth (1990–1997); Fox Sports South (1997–1999, 2012–2021); Fox Sports Net South (1999–2004); FSN South (2004–2008); FS South (2008–2012); Bally Sports South (2021–2024)

Links
- Website: www.fanduelsportsnetwork.com

FanDuel Sports Network South was an American regional sports network owned by Main Street Sports Group (formerly Diamond Sports Group) and operated as an affiliate of FanDuel Sports Network. The network carries regional coverage of professional and collegiate sports events from across the Southern United States, along with other sporting events and programming from FanDuel Sports Network and FanDuel TV.

FanDuel Sports Network South was available on cable providers throughout Alabama, Georgia, Kentucky, Mississippi, North Carolina, South Carolina and Tennessee. It was also available nationwide on satellite via DirecTV.

== History ==
Former Fox Sports South logo

FanDuel Sports Network South was originally launched on August 29, 1990, as SportSouth, under the ownership of the Turner Broadcasting System, in conjunction with business partners Tele-Communications Inc. (TCI) and Scripps-Howard Broadcasting. At its launch, the channel held the regional cable television rights to the Atlanta Braves, Atlanta Hawks and Charlotte Hornets. Shortly after Turner completed its merger with Time Warner, SportSouth was purchased by News Corporation's Fox Cable Networks in the winter of 1996. The channel was integrated into the recently formed Fox Sports Net group of regional sports networks, and was officially rebranded as Fox Sports South in January 1997. The channel's name was amended to "Fox Sports Net South" in 2000, as part of a collective brand modification of the FSN networks under the "Fox Sports Net" banner).

In 2002, Fox Sports South began producing the Southern Sports Report from its Midtown Atlanta studios, as part of the collective FSN networks' expansion of "regional sports reports" to complement the National Sports Report, both formatted as daily news programs focusing on sports news and highlights. The Atlanta studios served as a production hub for the regional sports reports broadcast on other FSN networks, often utilizing the same anchors (with Terry Chick being the most prominent). The Southern Sports Report was discontinued in 2005; around the same time, FSN South began producing a similar program, Around The South, which focused on sports stories across the region. In 2004, the channel shortened its name to FSN South, through the networks' de-emphasis of the Fox Sports Net brand.

On February 23, 2006, News Corporation purchased the general entertainment cable channel Turner South from the Turner Broadcasting System for $375 million. After the deal was completed, the channel dropped all remaining entertainment programming and converted into a sports-exclusive channel as it became part of the Fox Sports Networks group, adopting the "SportSouth" name formerly used by Fox Sports South. FSN South, which effectively became a sister network to the new SportSouth (which was renamed Fox Sports Southeast in October 2015), reverted to the Fox Sports South moniker in 2008.

In 2008, SportSouth acquired the partial television rights to the Atlanta Braves, splitting the telecasts with Atlanta independent station WPCH-TV (channel 17), which ceased distributing the station's Braves telecasts nationally after its separation from its companion superstation feed TBS (which became a conventional cable network) in October 2007. After Turner turned over the operations of WPCH to the Meredith Corporation under a local marketing agreement in 2011, production of the Braves telecasts was transferred from Turner Sports to Fox Sports South, in a deal in which the channel would produce a package of 45 regular season games each year for WPCH.

On February 28, 2013, Fox Sports South and SportSouth reached a deal with the Braves to acquire the 45 additional Atlanta Braves games beginning with the 2013 season, ending the team's contract with WPCH-TV and marking the first time in 40 years that the team's game telecasts were not available on broadcast television in the Atlanta market. In July 2013, News Corporation spun off the Fox Sports Networks and most of its other U.S. entertainment properties into 21st Century Fox.

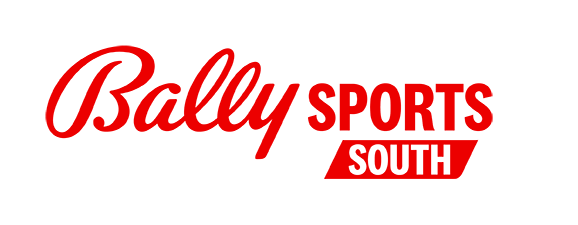
Former logo as Bally Sports South, used from 2021 to 2024.

On December 14, 2017, as part of a merger between both companies, The Walt Disney Company announced plans to acquire all 22 regional Fox Sports networks from 21st Century Fox, including Fox Sports South and sister network Fox Sports Southeast. However, on June 27, 2018, the Justice Department ordered their divestment under antitrust grounds, citing Disney's ownership of ESPN. On May 3, 2019, Sinclair Broadcast Group and Entertainment Studios (through their joint venture, Diamond Holdings) bought Fox Sports Networks from The Walt Disney Company for $10.6 billion. The deal closed on August 22, 2019. On November 17, 2020, Sinclair announced an agreement with casino operator Bally's Corporation to serve as a new naming rights partner for the FSN channels. Sinclair announced the new Bally Sports branding for the channels on January 27, 2021. On March 31, 2021, coinciding with the 2021 Major League Baseball season, Fox Sports South and sister network Fox Sports Southeast was rebranded as Bally Sports South and Bally Sports Southeast, resulting in 18 other Regional Sports Networks renamed Bally Sports in their respective regions. The first live sporting event on the regional network was the opening-day coverage of the Braves visiting the Phillies on April 1. The game was preceded by the "Braves Live" pregame show.

On March 14, 2023, Diamond Sports filed for Chapter 11 Bankruptcy.

On October 16, 2024, it was revealed in a court filing that Diamond had reached a new sponsorship agreement with FanDuel Group, under which it intended to rebrand Bally Sports as the FanDuel Sports Network; on October 18, 2024, Diamond officially announced the rebranding, which took effect October 21. Under the agreement, FanDuel has the option to take a minority equity stake of up to 5% once Diamond Sports exits bankruptcy. The branding is downplayed within programming related to high school sports.

On February 24, 2026, the Atlanta Braves announced the launch of their own network called BravesVision, which games will be produced and distributed in-house, ending their tenure with FanDuel Sports Network. In addition, a limited selection of Braves games will also be broadcast on local Gray Media television stations for free in the Southeast area through a continued partnership with Gray Media. Braves games telecast by BravesVision can also be streamed on the MLB's Braves.tv platform.

On April 7th, 2026, the Nashville Predators reached a multiyear agreement with Scripps Sports, with Nashville's Ion Media station WNPX-TV carrying all regional preseason, regular-season and first-round playoff games starting in the 2026-27 NHL season.

== Coverage area ==
FanDuel Sports Network South's coverage area includes Alabama, Georgia, Mississippi, North Carolina, South Carolina, Tennessee, and most of Kentucky. It is, by far, the largest coverage by area and total market reach of any FanDuel Sports Network affiliate. As such, the channel is often separated into several sub-regional feeds for the purposes of adhering to the various professional leagues' home territory rules.

For example, Memphis Grizzlies games are only seen in Tennessee, most of Kentucky, northern Mississippi and northern Alabama. Nashville Predators games are available in those markets plus Georgia. Meanwhile, Charlotte Hornets and Carolina Hurricanes games are only seen in North and South Carolina. Neither team's games are seen elsewhere within FanDuel Sports Network South's coverage area, although Predators games are occasionally rebroadcast in North Carolina. The Atlanta Hawks also have restrictions preventing games from being carried in most of the Carolinas, parts of Mississippi, and all of Kentucky.

In some areas select games from neighboring FanDuel Sports Networks are carried on either FDSN South or an alternate channel. These include games from the Indiana Pacers (FanDuel Sports Network Indiana), until 2024, New Orleans Pelicans (Bally Sports New Orleans), and until 2026, St. Louis Cardinals (FanDuel Sports Network Midwest) and the Cincinnati Reds (FanDuel Sports Network Ohio).

In October 2008, Fox decided to split Fox Sports South into three separate channels to offer more localized sports coverage. It launched separate respective feeds for the Carolinas and most of Tennessee, Fox Sports Carolinas and Fox Sports Tennessee. Fox Sports considered these feeds as separate networks, which maintained their own sub-sites within the main Fox Sports Local website. These channels were collapsed back into the Bally Sports South name when it launched on March 31, 2021, with a common non-gametime schedule, but the separate feeds otherwise continue.

=== Teams by Media Market ===
		MLB			NBA					NHL		WNBA
		Atlanta Braves (before 2026)	Cincinnati Reds (FanDuel Sports Network Ohio [before 2026])	St. Louis Cardinals (FanDuel Sports Network Midwest [before 2026])	Atlanta Hawks	Charlotte Hornets	Memphis Grizzles	Indiana Pacers (FanDuel Sports Network Indiana)	New Orleans Pelicans (WVUE FOX8)	Carolina Hurricanes	Nashville Predators [before 2026-27]	Atlanta Dream
	Network(see note)	South/Southeast	South/Southeast	South/Southeast	Southeast	Southeast	Southeast	South	South	South	South	South/Southeast
Georgia	(all markets including Atlanta)	Yes	No	No	Yes	No	No	No	No	Yes	Yes	Yes
Alabama	(excluding Huntsville and Mobile)	Yes	No	No	Yes	No	Yes	No	No	No	Yes	Yes
	Huntsville	Yes	No	No	No	No	Yes	No	No	No	Yes	Yes
	Mobile	Yes	No	No	Yes	No	Yes	No	Yes	No	Yes	Yes
Kentucky	(excluding Western Kentucky)	No	Available on FanDuel Sports Network Ohio	No	No	No	Yes	Yes	No	No	Yes	No
	Western Kentucky	No	No	Yes	No	No	Yes	Yes	No	No	Yes	No
Mississippi	(excluding Biloxi/Gulfport, Memphis and New Orleans)	Yes	No	No	Yes	No	Yes	No	Yes	No	Yes	Yes
	Biloxi/Gulfport	Yes	No	No	No	No	Yes	No	Yes	No	Yes	Yes
	Northern Mississippi (Memphis)	Yes	No	Yes	No	No	Yes	No	No	No	Yes	Yes
North Carolina	Charlotte, Asheville (excluding Graham, Jackson, Macon and Swain counties), Greensboro-High Point	Yes	Yes	No	No	Yes	No	No	No	Yes	No	Yes
	Graham, Jackson, Macon and Swain counties	Yes	Yes	No	Yes	Yes	No	No	No	Yes	No	Yes
	Greenville	No	No	No	No	Yes	No	No	No	Yes	No	No
	Raleigh-Durham	No	No	No	No	Yes	No	No	No	Yes	No	Yes
South Carolina	Charleston, Augusta, Savannah, Greenville/Spartanburg (Abbeville, Anderson, and Oconee counties only)	Yes	No	No	Yes	Yes	No	No	No	Yes	No	Yes
	Columbia, Greenville/Spartanburg (excluding Abbeville, Anderson, and Oconee counties), Myrtle Beach	Yes	No	No	No	Yes	No	No	No	Yes	No	Yes
Tennessee	Nashville, Chattanooga, Knoxville	Yes	Yes	No	Yes	No	Yes	No	No	No	Yes	Yes
	Memphis, Jackson	Yes	Yes	Yes	No	No	Yes	No	No	No	Yes	Yes

Note: In Kentucky, eastern North Carolina, and parts of Mississippi, FanDuel Sports Network Southeast is not available. In these areas all games are shown on FanDuel Sports Network South or an alternate channel.

== Programming ==
FanDuel Sports Network South holds the exclusive regional cable television rights to the Atlanta Hawks, Charlotte Hornets and Memphis Grizzlies of the NBA; and the Carolina Hurricanes of the NHL. The channel also provides coverage of men's college basketball from the Davidson Wildcats and the Missouri Valley Conference, including regional coverage of the Murray State Racers and Belmont Bruins. Due to the naming rights deal with FanDuel, select programming from FanDuel TV is included in the schedule.

== Announcers ==
=== Atlanta Hawks ===
- Bob Rathbun – play-by-play announcer
- Dominique Wilkins – analyst
- Matt Winer - Hawks LIVE host / reporter
- Madison Hock - reporter
- Brian Oliver - Hawks LIVE analyst / fill-in game analyst

=== Carolina Hurricanes ===
- Mike Maniscalco – play-by-play announcer
- Tripp Tracy – analyst
- Hanna Yates – Hurricanes LIVE host / in-game reporter
- Shane Willis – Hurricanes LIVE analyst

=== Charlotte Hornets ===
- Eric Collins – play-by-play announcer
- Dell Curry – analyst
- Shannon Spake – sideline reporter / Hornets LIVE host
- Terrence Oglesby Hornets LIVE analyst (Home Games Only)

=== Memphis Grizzlies ===
- Pete Pranica – play-by-play announcer
- Brevin Knight – analyst
- Rob Fischer – sideline reporter / Grizzlies LIVE host
- Chris Vernon – Grizzlies LIVE analyst / contributor (Home Games Only)

=== Nashville Predators ===
- Willy Daunic – play-by-play announcer
- Chris Mason – analyst
- Kara Hammer – rinkside reporter (home games)
- Hal Gill – Predators LIVE analyst
- Lyndsay Rowley – Predators LIVE host/reporter, rinkside reporter (away games)

== Former announcers ==
- John Forslund – Carolina Hurricanes play-by-play announcer
- Kevin Egan – Atlanta United play-by-play announcer
- Maurice Edu – Atlanta United analyst
- Jillian Sakovits – sideline reporter / Atlanta United LIVE host
- Kelly Crull - reporter / Braves LIVE fill-in pre-game and post-game host
- Rebecca Kaple – sideline reporter
- Ashley ShahAhmadi – sideline reporter / Hornets LIVE host
- Chip Caray – Atlanta Braves play-by-play announcer
- Andre Aldridge – sideline reporter / Hawks LIVE host
- Mike Glenn – Hawks LIVE analyst
- Gerald Henderson Hornets LIVE analyst
- Jerome Jurenovich – Braves LIVE and Hawks LIVE pre-game and post-game host
- Brian Jordan – Braves LIVE analyst
- Treavor Scales – Hawks LIVE host
- Tabitha Turner – Atlanta Hawks sideline reporter
- Vince Carter - Atlanta Hawks analyst (select games) and Hawks LIVE fill-in pre-game and post-game host

=== Atlanta Braves ===
- Brandon Gaudin – play-by-play announcer
- C. J. Nitkowski – analyst
- Jeff Francoeur – analyst
- Treavor Scales – Braves LIVE pre-game and post-game host
- Nick Green – Braves LIVE analyst / Braves Live fill-in pre-game and post-game host
- Peter Moylan – Braves LIVE analyst
- Wiley Ballard – reporter / alternate play-by-play announcer / Braves Live fill-in pre-game and post-game host
- Paul Byrd – reporter
- Hanna Yates – reporter

== See also ==
- Comcast/Charter Sports Southeast
- Raycom Sports
