= Chuck Kaiton =

Sports announcer

- Chuck Kaiton with his wife Mary during the Hurricanes Stanley Cup victory parade in 2006
- Born: 1951 or 1952 (age 74–75)
- Education: University of Michigan
- Occupation: Former Radio broadcaster for the Carolina Hurricanes
- Awards: Foster Hewitt Memorial Award (2004)

Charles "Chuck" Kaiton (born 1951 or 1952) is the former radio play-by-play announcer for the Carolina Hurricanes of the National Hockey League. He was employed by the franchise from the 1979–80 season, their first in the NHL after coming over from the World Hockey Association, while they were still the Hartford Whalers, and retired at the end of the 2017-18 season, having never missed a Hurricanes game.

== Career ==
Kaiton began his broadcasting career in 1969 at his alma mater, the University of Michigan, and moved on to broadcast sports at the University of Wisconsin–Madison in 1975. In 1979, he was named Wisconsin's Sportscaster of the Year. That same year, he made the jump to the NHL, joining the Hartford Whalers and following them to North Carolina in 1997–98. In 1986, he was elected president of the NHL Broadcasters Association. Unlike most broadcasters, who typically work in tandem with an analyst or color commentator, Kaiton normally called games alone.

In 2004, Kaiton was awarded the Foster Hewitt Memorial Award for outstanding contributions to hockey broadcasting.

In July 2018, the Hurricanes tendered Kaiton a new contract offer that would have required him to take an 80 percent pay cut. Kaiton turned it down, ending his 39-year tenure with the organization. The Hurricanes opted to simulcast the Fox Sports Carolinas television broadcast on the radio rather than hire a replacement for Kaiton.

== Notable calls ==
Kaiton's best-known call is of Justin Williams' empty-net goal in game 7 of the 2006 Stanley Cup Finals, which sealed the Stanley Cup for the Hurricanes.

Puck bunted down--Hurricanes steal! Staal gets it up the middle to Williams. He's walking in on an open net, AND HE WON THE STANLEY CUP! Justin Williams has won the Stanley Cup for the Carolina Hurricanes, in all likelihood with an empty-netter at 18:59 on a clearing pass out of the zone! You won't have to see the clocks go to 0:00 now!

At the end of the game, Kaiton yelled

9,393 days of frustration, and on the 9,394th day of NHL existence, the Carolina Hurricanes—the Whaler organization 'til '97—have won the Stanley Cup!

== See also ==
- Carolina Hurricanes
- List of Carolina Hurricanes broadcasters
- Hartford Whalers
- List of Hartford Whalers broadcasters
