= Fox Sports Tennessee =

Defunct regional sports television network

- Type: Regional sports network
- Country: United States
- Broadcast area: Tennessee eastern Arkansas southern Kentucky
- Network: Fox Sports Networks
- Headquarters: Nashville, Tennessee

Programming
- Language: English
- Picture format: 720p (HDTV); 480i (SDTV)

Ownership
- Owner: Diamond Sports Group
- Parent: Sinclair Broadcast Group & Entertainment Studios Networks
- Sister channels: Fox Sports South; Fox Sports Southeast; Fox Sports Carolinas

History
- Launched: October 31, 2008
- Replaced: Fox Sport South (within designated market)
- Closed: March 31, 2021

Links
- Website: www.foxsports.com/tennessee

Fox Sports Tennessee (FSTN) was an American regional sports network owned by Diamond Sports Group, a joint venture between Sinclair Broadcast Group and Entertainment Studios, and operated as an affiliate of Fox Sports Networks. The channel broadcast regional coverage of professional and collegiate sports events in the state of Tennessee, namely the Memphis Grizzlies and Nashville Predators.

Fox Sports Tennessee was available on cable providers throughout Tennessee, eastern Arkansas and southern Kentucky, with an estimated reach of 1.8 million subscribers, and nationwide on satellite via DirecTV and Dish Network.

The network closed down on March 31, 2021. Its content was merged into the schedules of the newly named Bally Sports South and Bally Sports Southeast.

== History ==
Fox Sports Tennessee logo, used from 2008 to 2012.

Fox Sports Tennessee launched on October 31, 2008, and was created through the separation of Fox Sports South into three regional networks: alongside the main Fox Sports South channel (originating from Atlanta, Georgia) and Fox Sports Carolinas, the latter of which launch on the same date as Fox Sports Tennessee. In July 2013, News Corporation spun off the Fox Sports Networks and most of its other U.S. entertainment properties into 21st Century Fox.

On December 14, 2017, as part of a merger between both companies, The Walt Disney Company announced plans to acquire all 22 regional Fox Sports networks from 21st Century Fox, including Fox Sports Tennessee. However, on June 27, 2018, the Justice Department ordered their divestment under antitrust grounds, citing Disney's ownership of ESPN. On May 3, 2019, Sinclair Broadcast Group and Entertainment Studios (through their joint venture, Diamond Holdings) bought Fox Sports Networks from The Walt Disney Company for $10.6 billion. The deal closed on August 22, 2019.

In 2020, Diamond Sports formed a partnership with Bally's Corporation was formed to rebrand the networks as "Bally Sports". On January 27, 2021, Bally's and Sinclair issued a joint press release unveiling the new logos for the rebrand of the networks that will occur at a still undetermined date later in 2021. It also was announced that Fox Sports Tennessee would be shut down at that time with programming being merged into the new Bally Sports South (previously Fox Sports South) and Bally Sports Southeast (previously Fox Sports Southeast). The final event broadcast by the network was a 3-2 Predators win in overtime against the Dallas Stars on March 30, 2021.

== Programming ==
Fox Sports Tennessee held the regional cable television rights to the Memphis Grizzlies of the NBA and the Nashville Predators of the NHL. It also carried simulcasts of Major League Baseball games, carrying Cincinnati Reds games televised by Fox Sports Ohio, St. Louis Cardinals games televised by Fox Sports Midwest and (within Tennessee) Atlanta Braves games televised by Fox Sports South, as well as coverage of collegiate sports events from the Southeastern Conference.

== Other services ==
=== Fox Sports Tennessee HD ===
Fox Sports Tennessee HD was a high definition simulcast feed of Fox Sports Tennessee, which broadcasts in the 720p format. The channel broadcasts most Predators and Grizzlies games (both live telecasts and late-night replays) as well as several NCAA football and basketball games shown nationally on FSN and other programming distributed nationally by Fox Sports Networks in high definition. Fox Sports Tennessee HD originally transmitted only during game telecasts (with a test pattern being shown at other times) until July 2009, when it was converted into a 24-hour simulcast feed.

== Announcers ==
=== Memphis Grizzlies ===
- Pete Pranica – play by play announcer
- Brevin Knight – analyst
- Rob Fischer - sideline reporter / Grizzlies LIVE host
- Chris Vernon - Grizzlies LIVE analyst / contributor

=== Nashville Predators ===
- Willy Daunic - play-by-play announcer
- Chris Mason - analyst
- Kara Hammer - rinkside reporter
- Terry Crisp - Predators LIVE analyst
- Lyndsay Rowley - Predators LIVE host/reporter
- Jerome Jurenovich and Kelsey Wingert – Preds Studio Update Host
