= Arnold Dean =

Arnold Dean (July 1, 1930 – December 8, 2012) was an American radio sports host notable for live radio broadcasts with Joe DiMaggio and Sammy Davis Jr.

Dean was born Arnold D'Angelo in Cortland New York, and was raised by his Italian mother and father. Upon attending Syracuse University, he began his career at WKRT in Cortland, New York, later moving onto WAGE in Syracuse. He then relocated to Wethersfield CT, joining WTIC in 1965. From 1965 to 1976, Dean served as a jack of all trades for WTIC television and radio. He was the 11pm sportscaster and hosted big band music programs, most notably, "One Night Stand with the Big Bands" and "Meet Me on the Plaza," the later of which he frequently broadcast from Constitution Plaza near the plaza entrance to WTIC. In 1976, Dean launched his own sports talk radio show, which would host celebrities and sports celebrities, and he was one of the originators of the format. He was in contact with Geno Auriemma, Artie Shaw, Jackie Robinson, Ted Williams, Stan Kenton, Count Basie, Benny Goodman, Gene Krupa, and Al Terzi throughout his career.

== Death ==
Dean died of natural causes at his home in Connecticut and is survived by his children Arnold D'Angelo Jr., Richard D'Angelo, and Mary Rondini-D'Angelo and his grandchildren Samantha, Anthony, Jenna, Nicole, and Nicholas.
