= John Forslund =

American sports announcer

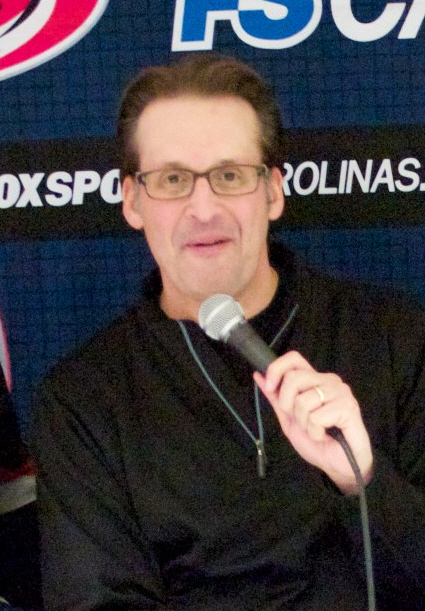
- Forslund in February 2012
- Born: February 14, 1962 (age 64); Springfield, Massachusetts, U.S.
- Education: BA, Springfield College; MA, Athletic Management, Adelphi University
- Occupation: Broadcaster
- Spouse: Natalie
- Children: 3

John Forslund (born February 14, 1962) is an American sports announcer who is the television play-by-play announcer of the Seattle Kraken. He had previously filled the same role for the Carolina Hurricanes and was with the team since 1991 (when the team was the Hartford Whalers) and called games from 1995 to 2020.

== Early life and education ==
John was born on February 14, 1962, and grew up in Springfield, Massachusetts, Forslund decided at an early age that he wanted to be a hockey play-by-play announcer. “I started doing the games off the television, from age 12 to 17,” he says. “My dad was my color man. We would turn the sound down and we would do any game that came on. His friends would come over and watch the Bruins play at night, and little Johnny would sit on the floor and call the game.” Forslund attended Cathedral High School before enrolling at Springfield College. Following this, Forslund earned his master's degree in athletic management from Adelphi University.

== Career ==
After graduating, Forslund handled the television and radio broadcasts for the American Hockey League's Springfield Indians from 1984 until 1991. In 1989, he won the Ken McKenzie Award, an award given to the AHL's top publicist and/or announcer. Following this, he joined the Hartford Whalers organization in 1991 as public relations director. In 1995, he replaced Rick Peckham on the Whalers television broadcasts, then on SportsChannel New England. Forslund served as the radio analyst alongside Chuck Kaiton during non-televised games. When Peter Karmanos Jr. moved the Whalers to Carolina in 1997, Forslund said the team's final game was very emotional. "It was a very emotional game and everyone was in tears from the camera man to the producer. The final game, which didn't have any playoff implications, was played against the Tampa Bay Lightning....For a game that is meaningless, this means everything!"

During his time with the Hurricanes, Forslund served as a play-by-play announcer for ESPN National Hockey Night, NHL on Versus, NBCSN, NBC Sports, and has called ACC and SEC basketball for Fox Sports Net. On June 27, 2002, Ken Lehner announced that Forslund signed a two-year contract extension with the Hurricanes to remain as their television play-by-play broadcaster. As a result of his broadcasting achievements, Forslund was the recipient of the 2018 and 2019 North Carolina Sportscaster of the Year by the National Sports Media Association.

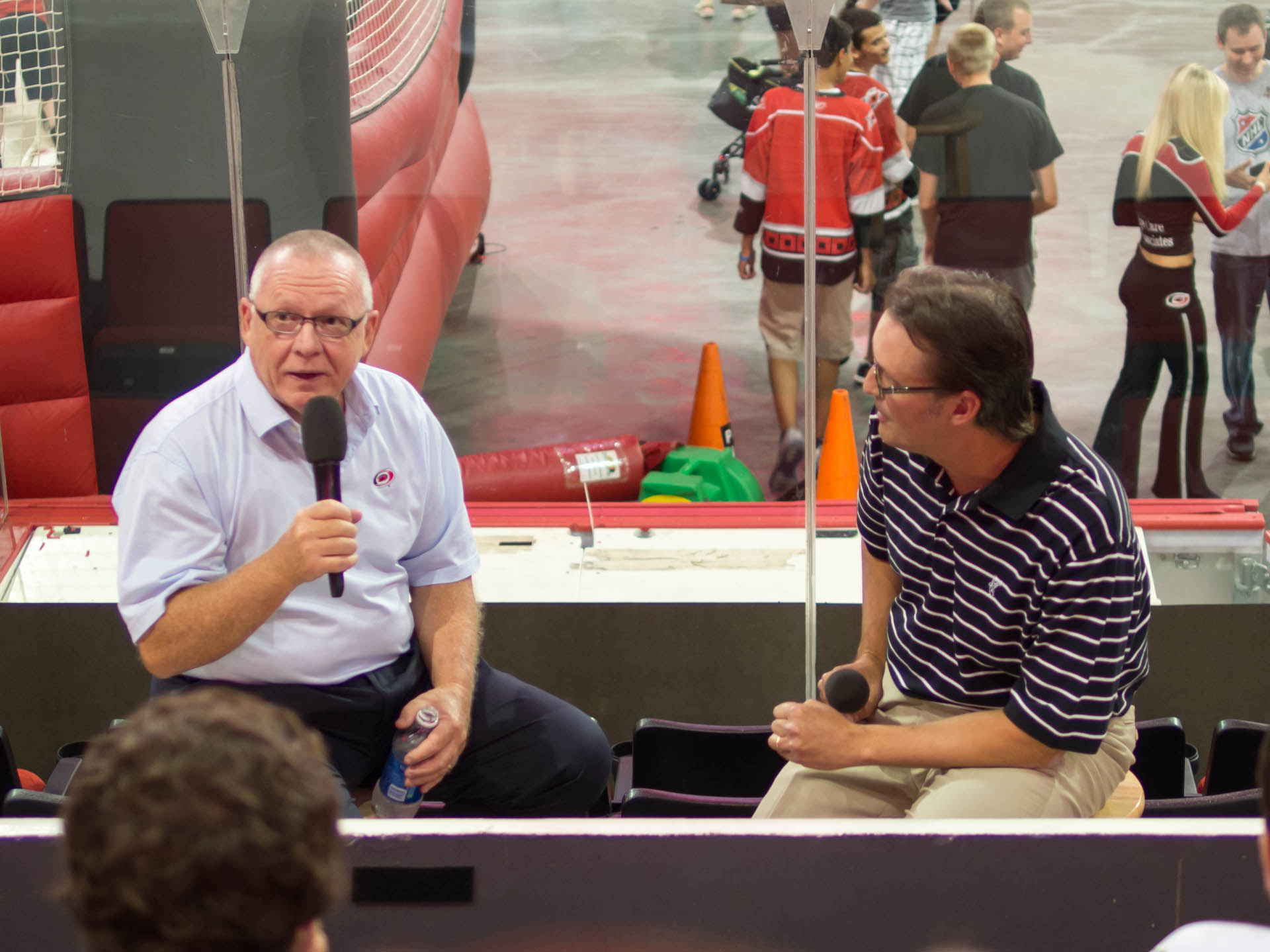
Forslund (right) with former Hartford Whalers/Carolina Hurricanes GM Jim Rutherford

Forslund's contract with the Hurricanes expired at the end of the 2020 regular season and was unresolved at the start of the Stanley Cup playoffs qualifying round. As a result, Forslund called games for NBC Sports in the Toronto, Canada hub through the second round of the Eastern Conference playoffs. On January 26, 2021, Forslund announced he had accepted the job as television play-by-play broadcaster on Root Sports Northwest for the Seattle Kraken ahead of their inaugural NHL season in fall 2021. Forslund joined the NHL on TNT crew as an occasional play by play broadcaster in 2022.

In April 2024, Canadian NHL broadcast rightsholder Rogers Communications announced that it had struck a deal to shift a portion of its rights – specifically the Monday night games played in Canada – from its own NHL on Sportsnet broadcast to Amazon Prime Video for the 2024–25 and 2025–26 regular seasons. In September, it was announced that Forslund would be the play-by-play announcer for Prime Monday Night Hockey, which launched with a game in Montreal on October 14, 2024.

== Personal life ==
Forslund and his wife Natalie have three children together, two daughters and one son. His son Matthew plays ice hockey with Brad McCrimmon's son, who worked with Forslund as a Springfield Indians announcer.
