= Rick Peckham =

American sports announcer

- Born: March 1955 (age 71)
- Occupation: broadcaster
- Years active: 1977-2020

Rick Peckham (born March 1955) is an American retired play-by-play broadcaster for the NHL's Tampa Bay Lightning hockey team. He was the 2020 recipient of the Foster Hewitt Memorial Award. Peckham served as the play-by-play announcer for the Hartford Whalers from 1984 through 1995. He has also broadcast NHL games on ESPN (1987–88) and SportsChannel America (1988–92). Through 1977–84, he called games on television and radio for the AHL's Rochester Americans. Peckham was broadcasting Lightning games with the Florida-based Fox Sports Sun, as well as occasionally doing play-by-play for the NHL on NBC, a role that increased with the death of Dave Strader. He is a 1977 graduate of Kent State University with a B.A. degree in telecommunications.

== Career as a broadcaster ==
- Rochester Americans play-by-play, TV and radio, 1977–84.
- Hartford Whalers TV play-by-play, SportsChannel New England, 1984–95 (New England Emmy Award-winning live sports production in 1993).
- University of Hartford basketball, 1986–87.
- ESPN NHL on ESPN play-by-play, 1987–88.
- NHL on SportsChannel America play-by-play, 1988–92.
- SportsChannel America college basketball play-by-play, 1991–95.
- Tampa Bay Lightning play-by-play, 1995–2020.
- ESPN International NFL and NBA telecasts, 1995.
- Tampa Bay Storm play-by-play, 1997–02 and 2005.
- NHL on Versus/NHL on NBC play-by-play, 2007–2020.
