= Mike Maniscalco =

American sports announcer

Michael Maniscalco
- Born: 1976 (age 49–50); Buffalo, New York, U.S.
- Education: Buffalo State College, 1997
- Occupation: Broadcaster
- Spouse: Kristen

Michael Maniscalco (born 1976) is an American sports announcer who is the television play-by-play announcer of the Carolina Hurricanes.

== Early life and education ==
Mike was born in 1976 in Buffalo, New York. He graduated in 1997 from Buffalo State College.

== Career ==
His first job in broadcasting was the on-air host and assistant production director at WGR 550 in Buffalo from 1996-2001. He then worked for WRNL from 2001-2007 in Richmond, Virginia as the afternoon host on the "The Mike Maniscalco Show". He moved to Raleigh, North Carolina in 2007 to work for WCMC-FM as the pre- and post-game shows for the Carolina Hurricanes. He transitioned to a TV host for the Hurricanes starting in 2016. He became the play-by-play announcer for the Hurricanes in 2020, after contract talks fell through with John Forslund.

The National Sports Media Association named him the North Carolina Sportscaster of the Year for 2025.

== Personal life ==
He is married to Kristen.
