= Carolina Hurricanes =

Ice hockey team in North Carolina

- 2026–27 Carolina Hurricanes season
- Conference: Eastern
- Division: Metropolitan
- Founded: 1972
- History: New England Whalers; 1972–1979 (WHA); Hartford Whalers; 1979–1997 (NHL); Carolina Hurricanes; 1997–present
- Home arena: Lenovo Center
- City: Raleigh, North Carolina
- Team colors: Black, red, gray, white
- Media: Television: Hurricanes Hockey Network; Radio: ESPN The Fan (99.9 FM); The Buzz (620 AM); ESPN Greenville (107.5 FM/1570 AM); ESPN New Bern (103.9 FM/1490 AM); Inside the Game (730 AM)
- Owner: Tom Dundon (majority)
- General manager: Eric Tulsky
- Head coach: Rod Brind'Amour
- Captain: Jordan Staal
- Minor league affiliates: Chicago Wolves (AHL); Greensboro Gargoyles (ECHL)
- Stanley Cups: 2 (2005–06, 2025–26)
- Conference championships: 3 (2001–02, 2005–06, 2025–26)
- Presidents' Trophies: 0
- Division championships: 7 (1998–99, 2001–02, 2005–06, 2020–21, 2021–22, 2022–23, 2025–26)
- Official website: nhl.com/hurricanes

The Carolina Hurricanes (colloquially known as the Canes) are a professional ice hockey team based in Raleigh, North Carolina. The Hurricanes compete in the National Hockey League (NHL) as a member of the Metropolitan Division in the Eastern Conference. The team plays its home games at the Lenovo Center.

The franchise was formed in 1971 as the New England Whalers of the World Hockey Association (WHA). The Whalers saw success immediately, winning the Eastern Division in the WHA's first three seasons and becoming the inaugural Avco World Trophy champions at the end of the 1972–73 season. The Whalers again competed for the World Trophy in 1978, this time falling short to the Winnipeg Jets in a rematch of the 1973 Avco Cup Final. The franchise joined the NHL in 1979 as part of the NHL–WHA merger, renaming themselves the Hartford Whalers. The team relocated to North Carolina in 1997, rebranding themselves as the Carolina Hurricanes.

The Hurricanes have won the Stanley Cup Final twice in 2006 and in 2026. They are the only professional team from North Carolina to have won a major sports championship.

== History ==
=== New England/Hartford Whalers (1971–1997) ===
The New England Whalers were established in November 1971 when the World Hockey Association (WHA) awarded a franchise to begin play in Boston, Massachusetts. For the first two years of their existence, the club played their home games at the Boston Arena and Boston Garden. With the increasing difficulty of scheduling games at Boston Garden (owned by the NHL rival Boston Bruins), the owners decided to move the team to Hartford, Connecticut, beginning with the 1974–75 season. While waiting for the completion of a new arena in Hartford, the Whalers played the first part of the season at the Big E Coliseum in West Springfield, Massachusetts. On January 11, 1975, the team played its first game in front of a sellout crowd at the Hartford Civic Center Coliseum, and would maintain its home there through 1997.

Hartford Whalers logo

The Whalers, along with the Edmonton Oilers, Quebec Nordiques and Winnipeg Jets, were admitted to the NHL when the rival leagues merged in 1979. However, under pressure from the extant NHL team in the New England area, the Boston Bruins, the Whalers were compelled to rename the team the Hartford Whalers. The Whalers were never as successful in the NHL as they had been in the WHA, recording only three winning seasons. They peaked in the mid-to-late 1980s, winning their only playoff series in 1986 over the Nordiques before bowing out in the second round to the Montreal Canadiens, taking the Canadiens to overtime of game seven in the process. The next year, the club secured the regular season Adams Division title, only to fall to the Nordiques in six games in the first round of the playoffs. In 1992, the Whalers made the playoffs for the final time, but were bounced in the first round in seven games by the Canadiens. Two years later, the team hired Jim Rutherford as general manager, a position that he would hold within the franchise for twenty years.

For years, the organization maintained many Whalers connections among its off-ice personnel; in addition to many members of executive management and the coaching staff, broadcasters Chuck Kaiton, John Forslund and Tripp Tracy (at the time a minor-league player), and equipment managers Wally Tatomir, Skip Cunningham and Bob Gorman all made the move to North Carolina with the team. Finally, the old goal horn from the Hartford Civic Center remains in use at Lenovo Center. Kaiton and Forslund would both eventually leave the franchise; Kaiton in 2018 and Forslund in 2021.

=== Move to North Carolina (1997–2001) ===
The Whalers were plagued for most of their existence by limited marketability. Hartford was the smallest American market in the league and was located on the traditional dividing line between the home territories for New York City and Boston teams. It did not help matters that the Hartford Civic Center was one of the smallest arenas in the league, seating under 16,000 spectators for hockey. The Whalers' off-ice problems were magnified when the start of the 1990s triggered a spike in player salaries.

Despite assurances made when he purchased the team in 1994 that the Whalers would remain in Hartford at least through 1998. In March 1997, owner Peter Karmanos announced that the team would move elsewhere after the 1996–97 season. This was because of the team's inability to negotiate a satisfactory construction and lease package for a new arena in Hartford. On May 6, 1997, Karmanos announced that the Whalers would move to the Research Triangle area of North Carolina and the new Entertainment and Sports Arena (ESA) in Raleigh. Due to the relatively short time frame for the move, Karmanos himself thought of and decided upon the new name for the club, the Carolina Hurricanes, rather than holding a contest as is sometimes done. Later that summer, the team dropped the Whalers' colors of blue, green and silver for a new black-and-red scheme.Thereby matching the colors of the North Carolina State University Wolfpack, with whose men's basketball team they would share the arena in Raleigh. The Hurricanes inherited the Whalers' place in the Northeast Division.

Unfortunately for the team, the ESA would not be complete for two more years. The only arena in the Triangle-area with an ice plant was 45-year-old Dorton Arena; at 5,100 seats, it was too small even for temporary use. The Hurricanes chose to play home games in Greensboro, 90 minutes west of Raleigh, for their first two seasons after the move. However, the team would be based in Raleigh and practice in nearby Hillsborough—effectively saddling the Hurricanes with 82 road games for the next two years. This choice was disastrous for the franchise's attendance and reputation. With a capacity of over 21,000 people for ice hockey, the Greensboro Coliseum was the highest-capacity arena in the NHL. However, Triangle-area fans balked at making the 80-mile drive down I-40 to Greensboro. Likewise, fans from the Piedmont Triad mostly refused to support a lame-duck team that had displaced the popular Greensboro/Carolina Monarchs minor-league franchise. As a result, even with the first game hosting more than 18,000 fans, most games in Greensboro attracted crowds of 5,000 or fewer. The crowds looked even smaller than that in the cavernous environment. Furthermore, only 29 out of 82 games were televised (over-the-air and cable combined), and radio play-by-play coverage on WPTF was often preempted by Wolfpack basketball (for whose broadcasts WPTF was the flagship station), leaving these games totally unavailable to those who did not have a ticket. With by far the smallest season-ticket base in the NHL and attendance figures routinely well below the league average, Sports Illustrated ran a story titled "Natural Disaster", and ESPN anchors mocked the "Green Acres" of empty seats; in a 2006 interview, Karmanos admitted that "as it turns out, [Greensboro] was probably a mistake." Under the circumstances, the Hurricanes managed to stay competitive, but still finished last in the Northeast Division with 74 points, nine points out of the playoffs.

For 1998–99, the Hurricanes curtained off most of the upper deck lowering the Coliseum's listed capacity to about 12,000. Attendance continued to lag. Most games attracted crowds of well under 5,000. Conversely, on the ice the Hurricanes' performance improved led by the return of longtime Whalers' captain Ron Francis, Keith Primeau's 30 goals, and Gary Roberts' 178 penalty minutes. They tallied their first winning season and playoff appearance since 1992. They also won the newly formed Southeast Division by eight points, only their second division title as an NHL team (following the 1987 Adams Division title as the Whalers). Tragedy struck hours after the team's first-round loss to the Bruins, when defenseman Steve Chiasson was thrown from his pickup truck and killed in a single-vehicle drunk-driving crash.

The team finally moved to their newly completed arena in Raleigh in 1999. They became the first major sports team to play in Raleigh, and remain the only such team there as of 2026.

The aforementioned season was marked by an ultimately franchise-altering mid-season trade which saw Primeau dealt to the Philadelphia Flyers for several players, including future captain and eventual coach Rod Brind'Amour. With the move to the new arena, the Hurricanes introduced the "Storm Squad", the first cheerleaders for professional ice hockey in North America. In 2000–01, the Hurricanes managed to claim the eighth seed, nosing out the Boston Bruins, and landed a first-round match-up with the defending champions, the New Jersey Devils. The Devils eliminated the Hurricanes in six games. Down 3–0 in the series, the Hurricanes extended it to a sixth game, thereby becoming only the 10th team in NHL history to do so. Game 6 in Raleigh featured their best playoff crowd that year, as well as their loudest. Despite the 5–1 loss, Carolina was given a standing ovation by their home crowd as the game ended, erasing some of the doubts that the city would not warm up to the team.

=== Stanley Cup Final and slow starts (2001–2006) ===
The Hurricanes made national waves for the first time in the 2002 playoffs. They survived a late charge from the Washington Capitals to win the division, but expectations were low entering the first round against the defending Eastern Conference champion New Jersey Devils. However, Artūrs Irbe and Kevin Weekes were solid in goal and the Hurricanes won two games in overtime as they defeated the Devils in six games. Their second-round matchup was against the Montreal Canadiens, who were riding a wave of emotion after their captain Saku Koivu's return from cancer treatment. In the third period of game four in Montreal, down 2–1 in the series and 3–0 in the game, Carolina would tie the game and later win on Niclas Wallin's overtime goal. The game became known to Hurricanes fans as the "Miracle at Molson"; Carolina won the next two games by a combined 13–3 margin over a dejected Habs club to take the series.

In the conference finals, Carolina met the heavily favored Toronto Maple Leafs. In game 6 in Toronto, the Maple Leafs' Mats Sundin tied the game with 22 seconds remaining to send it to overtime, where Carolina's Martin Gélinas would score to send the franchise to their first Stanley Cup Final appearance. During this series, several Hurricanes fan traditions drew hockey-wide media attention for the first time: fans met the team at the Raleigh-Durham International Airport on the return from every road trip and echoed football-season habits honed for games across the parking lot by hosting massive tailgate parties before each home game, a relative novelty in the cold-weather-centric NHL. Inside the building, the Canadian Broadcasting Corporation's Don Cherry lauded the RBC Center as "the loudest building in the NHL", praise that would be echoed in 2006.

In the Stanley Cup Final, Carolina would face the Detroit Red Wings, thought to be the prohibitive favorite all year. Though the Hurricanes stunned the Wings in game one when Ron Francis scored in the first minute of overtime, Detroit stormed back to win the next four games. Game three in Raleigh featured a triple-overtime thriller eventually won by Detroit's Igor Larionov, the oldest player to score a last-round goal.

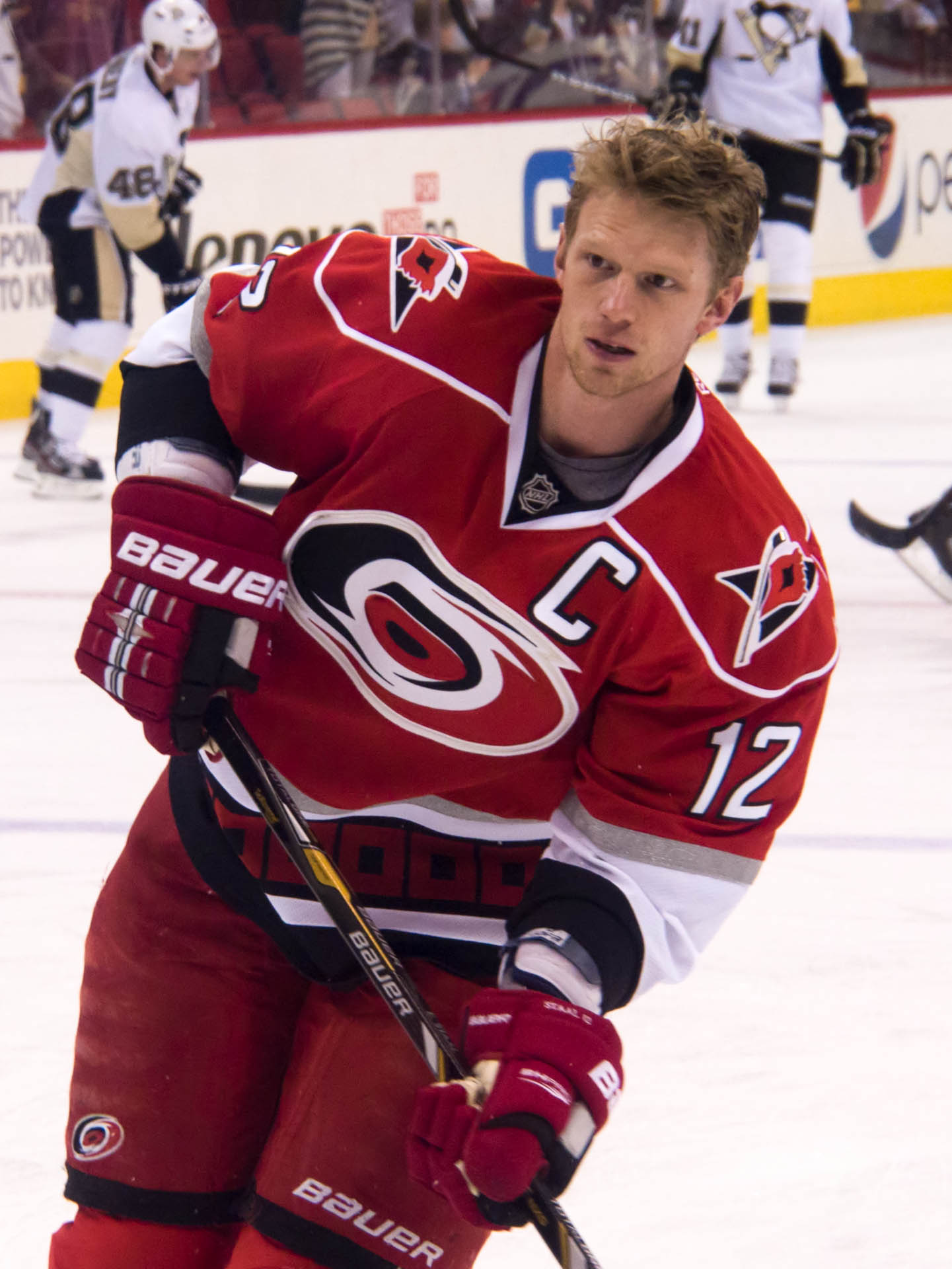
Eric Staal was drafted by the Hurricanes in the 2003 NHL entry draft. He was named team captain in 2010. He was later traded to the New York Rangers.

The Hurricanes looked poised to pick up where they left off in the 2002–03, but never recovered from a 10-loss January and finished dead last in the league with 61 points. After a similarly slow start to the 2003–04 season, Paul Maurice, who had been the team's coach since midway through their next-to-last season in Hartford, was fired and replaced with former New York Islanders bench boss Peter Laviolette. Under Laviolette, Weekes remained tough, but the offense was suspect; center Josef Vašíček led the team with a mere 19 goals and 26 assists for 45 points. Many of the new fans attracted to the team (and to hockey itself) during the 2002 playoff run lost interest and attendance declined. One of the few positive results of these losing years was the team's drafting of Eric Staal in 2003.

==== First Stanley Cup championship (2005–06) ====
The outcome of the 2004–05 NHL lockout led to the shrinking of the payroll to $26 million. The Hurricanes turned out to be one of the NHL's biggest surprises, turning in the best season in the franchise's 34-year history (including the years as the Whalers). They finished the regular season with a 52–22–8 record and 112 points, shattering the previous franchise records of 94 points (in the WHA) set by the 1972–73 Whalers and 93 points (in the NHL) set in 1986–87. It was the first time ever that the franchise had passed the 50-win and 100-point plateaus. The 112-point figure was good for fourth overall in the league, easily their highest overall finish as an NHL team (tied with the third-overall Dallas Stars in points, but with one fewer win than the Stars) and second in the East (one point behind the Ottawa Senators). The Hurricanes also ran away with their third Southeast Division title, finishing 20 points ahead of the Tampa Bay Lightning. Attendance increased from the 2003–04 season, averaging just under 15,600 per game, and the team made a profit for the first time since the move from Hartford.

In the playoffs, after losing the first two games of the conference quarterfinals series against the Montreal Canadiens, Laviolette lifted goalkeeper Martin Gerber, who had been struggling to regain his form after playing through a bout of intestinal flu, in favor of rookie Cam Ward. This proved to be a consequential decision, as the Hurricanes went on to win both games in Montreal, tying up the playoff series and turning the momentum around, winning the series on a game six overtime goal by Cory Stillman. Carolina then faced the New Jersey Devils in the conference semifinals, which proved surprisingly one-sided, as the Hurricanes beat the Devils in five games. Stillman struck again, once again scoring the series-winning goal.

In the conference finals, the Hurricanes faced the Buffalo Sabres, who had finished just one spot behind the Hurricanes in the overall standings. The contentious series saw both coaches – Lindy Ruff and Laviolette – taking public verbal shots at each other's team. In the deciding game seven, the Hurricanes rallied with three goals in the third to win by a score of 4–2. Rod Brind'Amour scored the game-winner as the Hurricanes reached the Stanley Cup Final for the second time in team history.

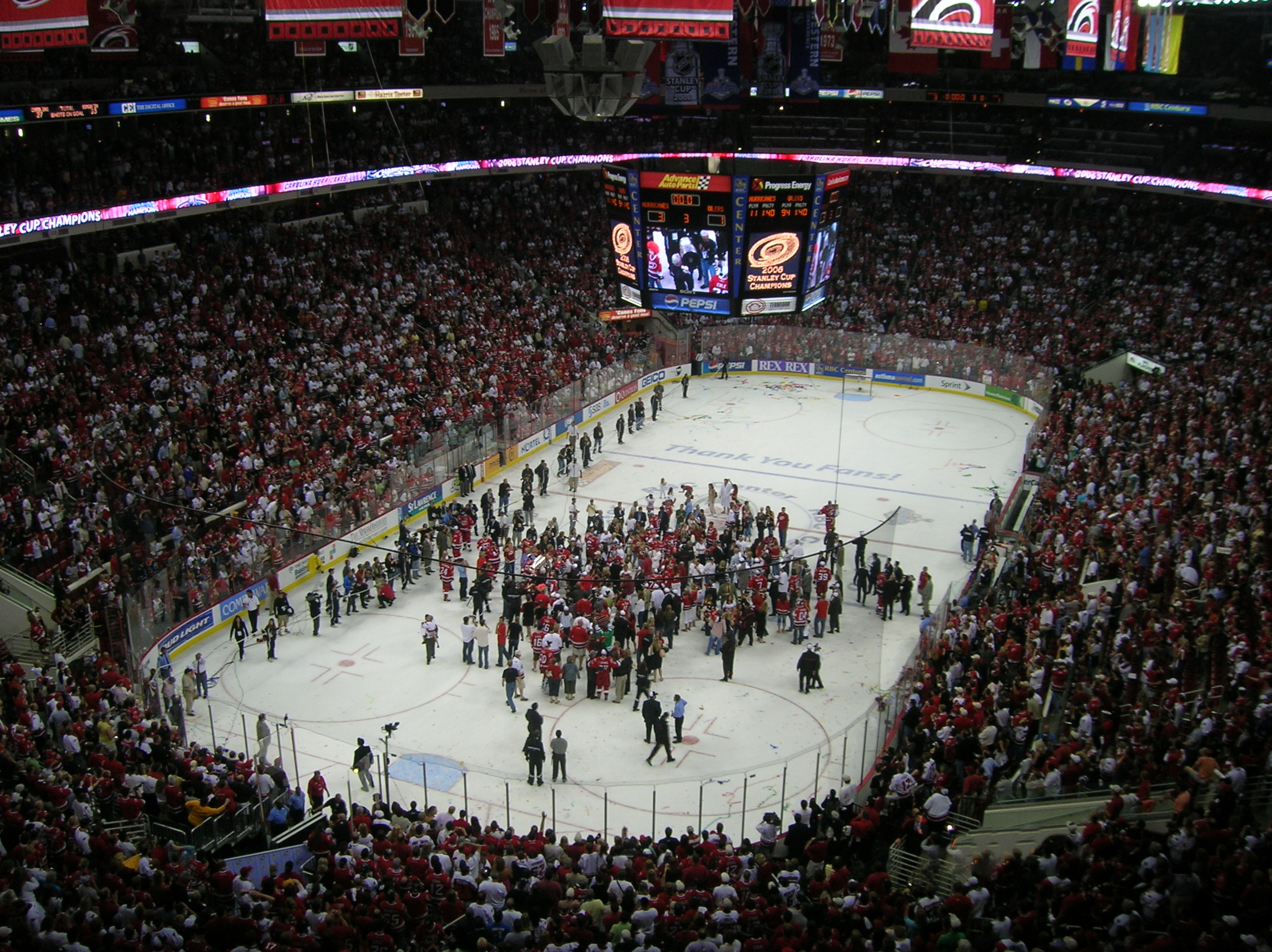
The Hurricanes celebrate following their game seven victory in the 2006 Stanley Cup Final.

The Stanley Cup Final saw the Hurricanes face the Edmonton Oilers. The Hurricanes rallied from a 3–0 deficit in game one to win 5–4 after Rod Brind'Amour scored with 30 seconds left. In game 2, the Hurricanes shelled the Oilers 5–0 to take a two-game lead. The Oilers won game three in Edmonton, 2–1, as Ryan Smyth scored the game-winning goal with 2:47 left to play. Carolina rebounded in game four with a 2–1 victory, and came home with a chance to win the Cup on home ice. However, game five saw the Oilers come back with a stunning 4–3 overtime win on a shorthanded breakaway by Fernando Pisani. In game 6 in Edmonton, Carolina was soundly defeated 4–0; the only bright point for the Hurricanes was the return of forward Erik Cole from a broken neck that had sidelined him since March. In game 7, before the then second-largest home crowd in franchise history (18,978), the Hurricanes won 3–1, sealing the Hurricanes' first Stanley Cup championship in franchise history. Cam Ward was honored with the Conn Smythe Trophy for being the playoffs' most valuable player, becoming just the fourth rookie to be honored with the award. Several Hurricanes raised the Cup for the first time in their long NHL careers; Rod Brind'Amour and Bret Hedican had both played over 15 years without winning the Cup, while Glen Wesley, the last remaining member of the Hartford Whalers on the Hurricanes' roster, had waited 18 seasons. On the managerial side, general manager Jim Rutherford finally won the Cup in his twelfth year with the franchise since joining the Whalers in 1994.

The Hurricanes Stanley Cup championship marked the first professional major league sports title for a team from North Carolina. As well, they were the first NHL team to win the Stanley Cup despite losing at least nine playoff games in that year; the 2011 Boston Bruins, the 2014 Los Angeles Kings, the 2017 Pittsburgh Penguins, and the 2019 St Louis Blues are the only other teams to have achieved this feat.

=== Post-championship slump (2006–2013) ===
The Hurricanes were unable to follow up their recent success. Losing four players to free agency in the off-season and 222-man games to injury during the 2006–07, the team struggled throughout the regular season, and once eliminated in the last game, the Hurricanes finished third in the Southeast and 11th overall in the Eastern Conference. This finish made them the first champions since the 1938–39 Chicago Black Hawks to have failed to qualify for the playoffs both the seasons before and after their championship season, and the third champion overall to not defend its title after both the Blackhawks and the 1995-96 New Jersey Devils.

In the 2007–08, Carolina again missed out as Washington Capitals stormed back to take the division title on the last day of the season, leaving the Hurricanes second in the division and ninth overall in the conference, and making the Hurricanes only the second club in NHL history to miss the playoffs for two seasons running after a Stanley Cup triumph.

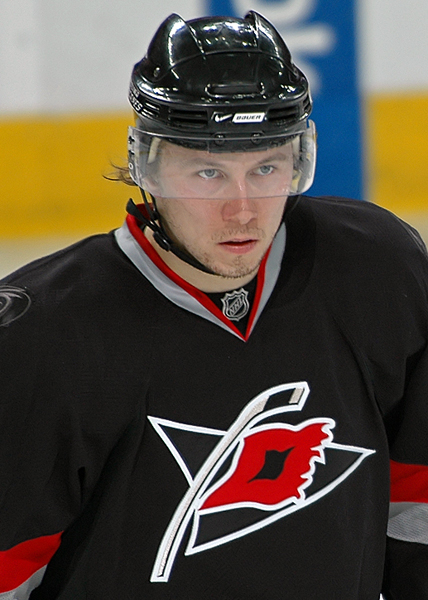
In 2009, the Hurricanes acquired Jussi Jokinen through a trade with the Tampa Bay Lightning.

After a slow start to the 2008–09 season, Cup-winning coach Peter Laviolette was fired in early December and replaced by his own predecessor, Paul Maurice. Teetering on the edge of the playoff picture again, the club, on February 7, acquired utility forward Jussi Jokinen from the Tampa Bay Lightning in exchange for Wade Brookbank, Josef Melichar and Carolina's fourth-round draft pick in 2009, then reacquired winger Erik Cole from the Edmonton Oilers at the March trade deadline and proceeded on a 12–3–2 run to close out the season. The stretch run included nine straight wins, matching a franchise record from the 2005–06 season, and capped off a streak of 12 straight home wins, which set a new franchise mark. The team finished sixth in the Eastern Conference with 97 points, the second-most points in franchise history.

The Hurricanes' 2009 playoff run featured two tight series with dramatic finishes. Game 4 of the first-round matchup with the New Jersey Devils saw Stanley Cup playoff history when Jussi Jokinen scored with 0.2 seconds left in regulation to win the game, the latest regulation game-winning goal in NHL history. Then, in game 7, the Devils took a 3–2 lead into the final two minutes of the game at the Prudential Center in Newark before the Hurricanes struck. With 1:20 to play, Tim Gleason saved a puck on his knees at the right point, passed it to Joni Pitkänen on the left boards, who then hit game 4 hero Jussi Jokinen at the far post for the tying goal. Just 48 seconds later, Chad LaRose sprang Eric Staal for a solo down-ice rush to give the Hurricanes 4–3 game and series win; Staal's goal was the latest regulation game 7-winning goal in playoff history. The game 7 comeback would become known as the "Shock at the Rock". In the second-round matchup with the top-seeded Boston Bruins, the Hurricanes ran out to a 3–1 lead before the Bruins battled back for two wins. In game 7 in Boston, Scott Walker scored the game and series winner 18:46 into overtime to send Carolina to the conference finals against the Pittsburgh Penguins. The Penguins, though, put a decisive end to the Hurricanes' string, sweeping the series 4–0 on the way to their own Stanley Cup championship.

As a result of their surprise run, very few changes were made in the off-season. Veterans such as Aaron Ward, Andrew Alberts, and Stéphane Yelle were brought in to help drive the team further, but things did not go according to plan. The Hurricanes experienced a 14-game losing streak spanning October and November, and midway through the year, the Hurricanes replaced their only post-lockout captain Rod Brind'Amour with Eric Staal. Despite improved play during the second half of the season, they could not overcome the deficit from early on in the season. The Hurricanes would end up with the seventh overall pick in the 2010 NHL entry draft, eventually selecting Jeff Skinner from the Kitchener Rangers of the Ontario Hockey League (OHL). Brind'Amour retired over the 2010 off-season to take a coaching job with the club.

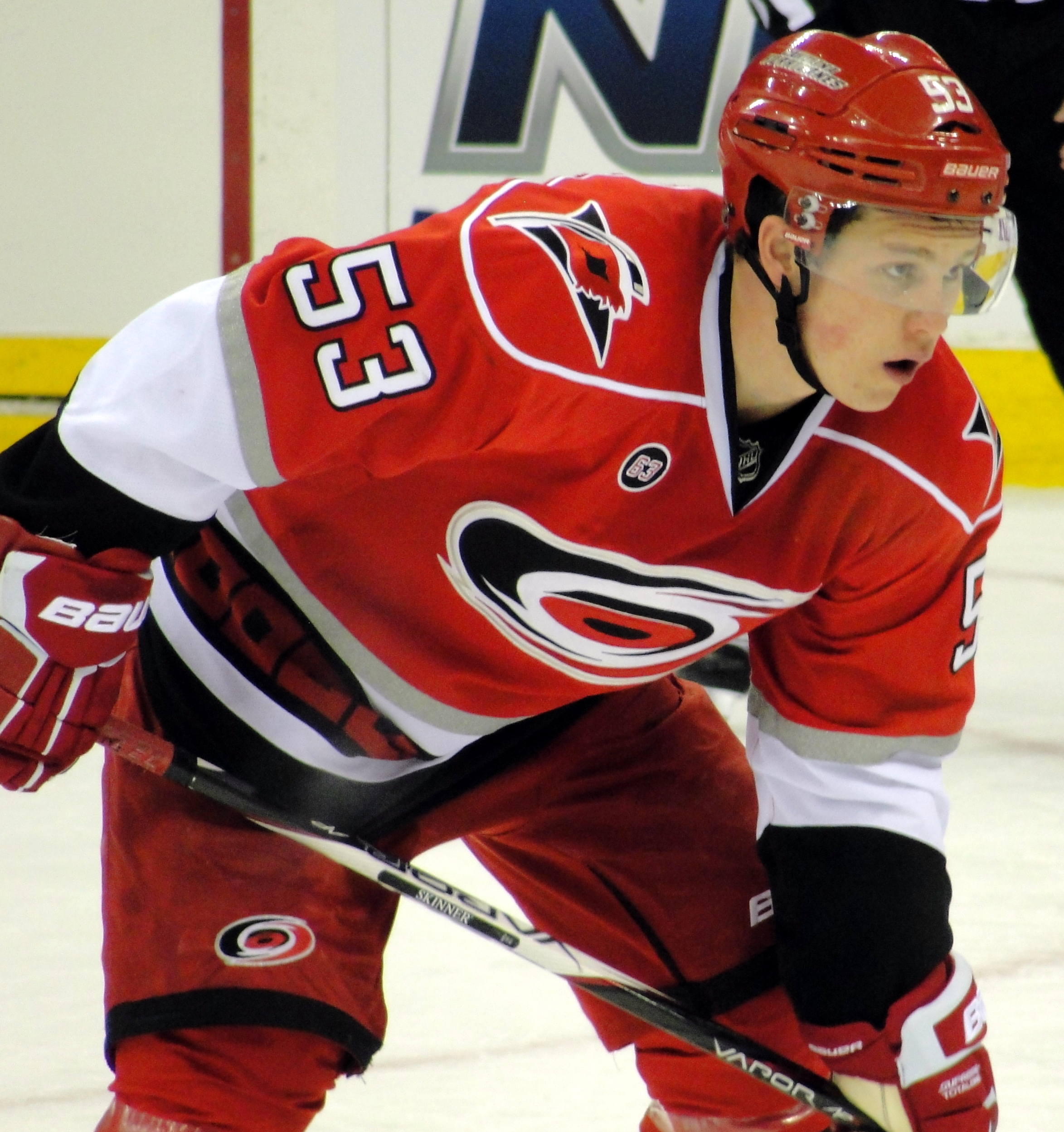
Jeff Skinner was awarded the Calder Memorial Trophy for his rookie season performance in the 2010–11 season.

The 2010–11 season was widely expected to be a transitional year from the veteran-heavy, high-salary club that opened 2009–10 to a younger, cheaper base. The Hurricanes contended for a playoff slot for the entire season aided by Skinner's emergence as an offensive phenomenon who, as the youngest player in the league, would lead all rookies in points. Raleigh hosted the 2011 NHL All-Star Game in January, and Eric Staal captained a team he selected (opposite a team selected by the Detroit Red Wings' Nicklas Lidström) that featured Skinner (the youngest All-Star in NHL history), Cam Ward, and (for the SuperSkills competition) defenseman Jamie McBain. The Hurricanes went into the final day of the season able to determine their own fate, but lost 6–2 to the Tampa Bay Lightning to finish ninth in the East. Skinner was awarded the Calder Memorial Trophy as rookie of the year, the first player in franchise history to receive that honor.

In December 2011, the Carolina Hurricanes fired coach Paul Maurice and hired Kirk Muller. On February 20, 2012, the Carolina Hurricanes signed Tim Gleason to a four-year, $16 million extension and two days later, on February 22, they also signed Tuomo Ruutu to a four-year, $19 million extension. Two months later the Carolina Hurricanes announced that they had signed Jiří Tlustý to a two-year deal that would pay him $1.5 million for 2012–13 and $1.7 million for 2013–14 (Gleason and Tlustý would eventually be traded to the Washington Capitals and the Winnipeg Jets over the next few seasons). Despite the signings of Gleason, Ruutu, and Tlustý, the Hurricanes would finish fifth in the Southeast Division and twelfth in the Eastern Conference during the 2011–12 season, which forced them to miss the playoffs for a third consecutive season.

On May 9, 2012, the 2006 Stanley Cup champions Hurricanes' game 7 victory was recognized as one of the NC Hall of Fame's "Great Moments" series. During the 2012 NHL entry draft, the Carolina Hurricanes traded Brandon Sutter, Brian Dumoulin and their 2012 first-round draft pick (Derrick Pouliot) to the Penguins in exchange for Jordan Staal, uniting the player with his older brother, Eric Staal. On March 25, 2013, the Hurricanes signed Alexander Semin to a five-year deal, worth $35 million. However, in the lockout-shortened 2012–13 season, the team would finish third in the Southeast Division and 13th in the Eastern Conference, which would make the team miss the playoffs for the fourth consecutive season after a strong start was cut short by an injury to starting goaltender Cam Ward.

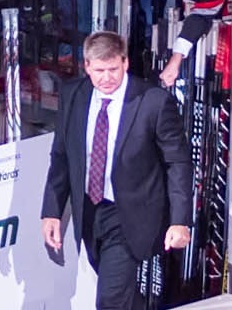
Bill Peters coached the Hurricanes from June 2014 to April 2018.

=== Continued decline and relocation rumors (2013–2017) ===
Before the 2013–14 season, the Hurricanes were realigned into the new Metropolitan Division. They would finish seventh in the division during the 2013–14 season (ahead of only the New York Islanders) and would miss the playoffs for the fifth consecutive season, which prompted management to fire head coach Kirk Muller. In addition, longtime general manager Jim Rutherford was moved to an advisory role after the season with longtime Whalers/Hurricanes star Ron Francis announced as his replacement on April 28, 2014.

On June 19, 2014, Bill Peters was named head coach, becoming the fifth head coach in franchise history. Peters' teams would not break the Hurricanes' playoff drought. During the 2014–15 season, the team finished last in the Metropolitan Division and would miss the playoffs for the sixth consecutive season. After team captain Eric Staal was traded to the New York Rangers at the trade deadline, the team finished sixth in the division during the 2015–16 season. Things did not improve in the 2016–17 season. The Hurricanes finished seventh in the division, missing the playoffs for the eighth consecutive season.

The Hurricanes also experienced uncertainty about their future in Raleigh during this time. Karmanos was looking to sell the team, something he'd been trying to do for years. Attendance at PNC Arena had declined at a consistent rate since 2009. It became so bad the team finished second-to-last in average league attendance in 2014 and 2015. Rumors started circulating in 2015 that the Hurricanes were possible contenders to move to either Las Vegas or Quebec City. The Quebec rumors in particular were widely reported, with the Hurricanes and the NHL both refuting the claims. Las Vegas would eventually gain an expansion team in the Vegas Golden Knights.

=== Tom Dundon and the "Bunch of Jerks" era (2017–present) ===
Before the 2017–18 season, the Hurricanes unveiled new uniforms. On July 13, 2017, it was reported that Chuck Greenberg had sent Karmanos a letter of intent to buy the team for $500 million. Greenberg would ultimately back out of a deal. On December 7, 2017, it was announced that Thomas Dundon signed an agreement to purchase the Hurricanes, which ensured that the team would not be relocated. The deal was finalized on January 11, 2018, with Dundon becoming majority owner and having a 61 percent stake in the team, while Karmanos retained a minority interest. Dundon wasted little time in overhauling the Hurricanes' front office. On March 8, 2018, the team announced that general manager Ron Francis had been moved to the role of president of hockey operations. However, Sportsnet reporter Elliotte Friedman reported that the "promotion" was likely in name only, noting that there were rumblings Francis and Dundon did not see "eye-to-eye". Subsequently, coach Bill Peters resigned from his position on April 20, 2018, to pursue a similar opportunity with the Calgary Flames (he ultimately replaced Glen Gulutzan as the Flames' head coach three days later), and the Hurricanes officially fired Francis from the organization altogether on April 30, 2018, leaving vacancies in both the head coach and general manager positions.

Early in the Hurricanes' search for a replacement general manager, it was reported that Dundon's salary offerings for the position could be prohibitive in attracting quality candidates. Sportsnet's Nick Kypreos reported that the Hurricanes were offering "in the ballpark of $400,000 a year", a fraction of the salary figures of many other teams' coaches, let alone those of their general managers, who serve in a higher-ranking position. Leading up to Kypreos' report, candidates such as Nashville Predators assistant general manager Paul Fenton, New Jersey Devils assistant general manager Tom Fitzgerald, and Los Angeles Kings assistant general manager Mike Futa had all reportedly passed on the position.

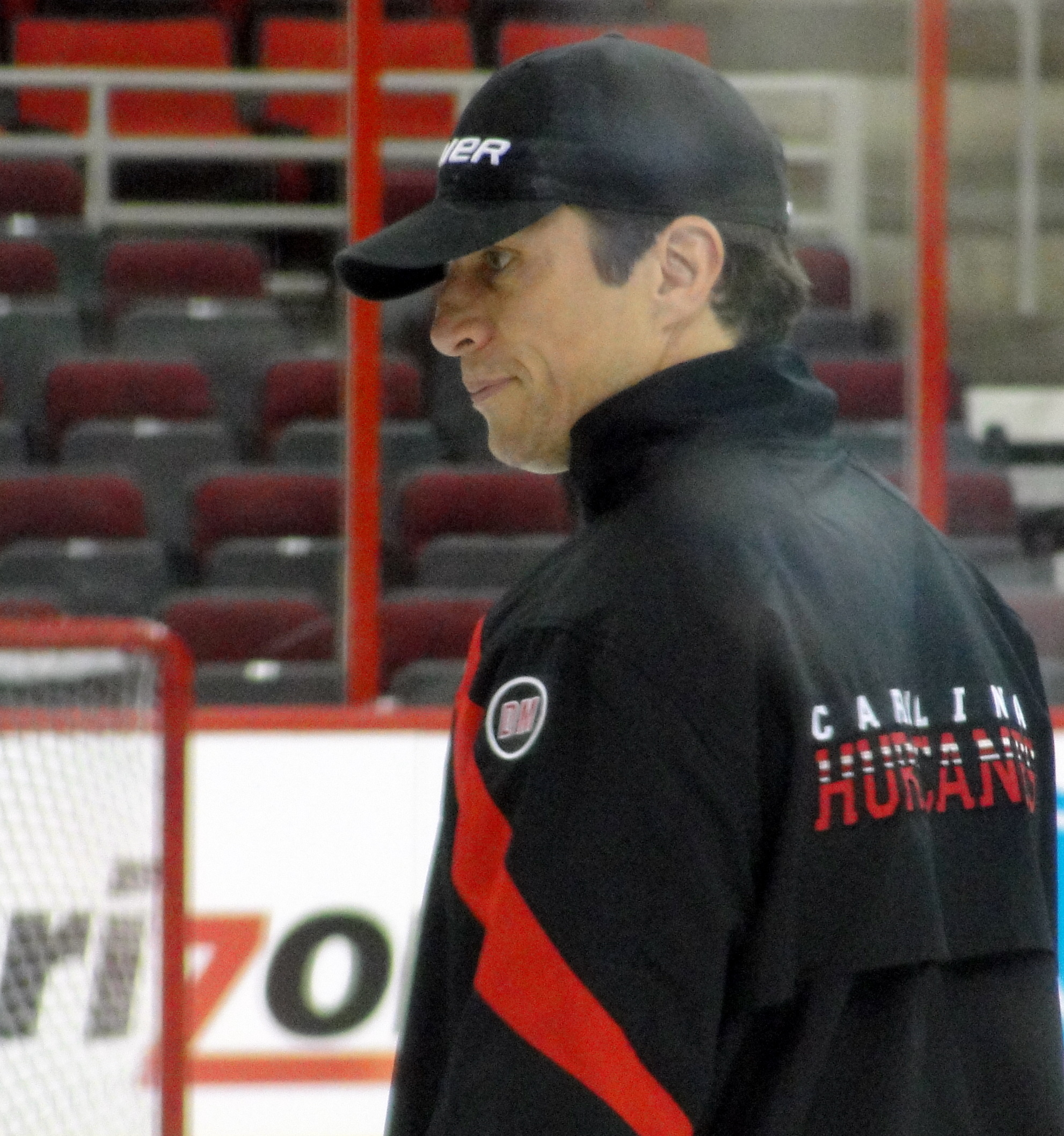
Rod Brind'Amour was hired as head coach in 2018. He won the Jack Adams Award as the NHL's best coach in 2021.

Ultimately, on May 8, 2018, the Hurricanes announced the hiring of former Atlanta Thrashers general manager Don Waddell as team president and general manager. Waddell had previously been serving as the team's interim general manager since the promotion of Francis. At the same time, it was announced that former team captain Rod Brind'Amour had been named head coach, after serving with the team as an assistant coach since 2011. On April 4, 2019, the Hurricanes won 3–1 over the New Jersey Devils, clinching a playoff spot for the first time since 2009 and only the second time since their Cup win. During their stretch run, the Hurricanes gained notice for their on-ice victory celebrations, which they called "Storm Surges". This led Don Cherry of Hockey Night in Canada to call the Hurricanes a "bunch of jerks". The Hurricanes adopted "Bunch of Jerks" as a battle cry, even going as far as projecting it on the ice at PNC Arena before and after games. During the 2019 Stanley Cup playoffs, on April 24, the Hurricanes defeated the defending 2018 Stanley Cup champions, the Washington Capitals, 4–3 in double overtime in game seven, winning their first playoff series since 2009. The team would then go on to defeat the New York Islanders in four straight games in the second round, recording the first best-of-seven playoff series sweep in franchise history, and advancing to the conference finals for the first time since 2009. It was also the first time since 1993 that an opposing team (the Islanders), that swept their opponent in the first round, the Pittsburgh Penguins, would then go on to lose four straight and drop the series. This trend continued into the third round against the Hurricanes' favor as they themselves were swept by the Boston Bruins, thus losing the conference finals.

On February 22, 2020, on the 40th anniversary of the Miracle on Ice, Hurricanes emergency goaltender David Ayres became the first emergency goaltender in NHL history to win a game, a 6–3 win against the Toronto Maple Leafs, the team whose minor league affiliate he works for as a Zamboni driver and maintenance man. The season would come to an abrupt end on March 11 due to the COVID-19 pandemic. On August 3, 2020, Andrei Svechnikov became the first Hurricanes/Whalers player to score a hat trick in the postseason in a 4–1 win over the New York Rangers. By beating the Rangers, the Hurricanes made the playoffs for a second straight season. However, they lost to the Bruins in five games. The loss also marked the first time since the 2001 playoffs that the Hurricanes lost in the first round.

The 2020–21 season concluded with the Hurricanes winning the Central Division, their first division championship since winning the Southeast Division in 2006. It was also the first time since moving to Raleigh that they had qualified for the postseason three years in a row and the first time in the history of the franchise that a head coach had taken the team to the playoffs in three consecutive years. They defeated the Nashville Predators in the first round in six games but lost to the eventual champion Tampa Bay Lightning in the second round in five games. Defenseman Jaccob Slavin won the Lady Byng Memorial Trophy, notably only having two penalty minutes (PIM) for the entire season. Defenseman Dougie Hamilton was named to the NHL All-Star second team, and goaltender Alex Nedeljkovic was named to the NHL All-Rookie team and placed third in the Calder Memorial Trophy voting, while head coach Brind'Amour was awarded the Jack Adams Award, being the first in Hartford/Carolina history to receive it. On June 30, 2021, it was announced that Tom Dundon had purchased all remaining minority shares in the team.

The 2021 off-season saw the Hurricanes overhaul the roster, resulting in many players departing. Warren Foegele was traded to Edmonton for Ethan Bear, Ian Cole and Brendan Smith was signed to complement the depth on defense. The team also overhauled their goaltending, trading away Alex Nedeljkovic for a pick and signing Frederik Andersen and Antti Raanta as the new goalie tandem. In perhaps their most talked-about moves, the Hurricanes signed Tony DeAngelo and signed Jesperi Kotkaniemi to an offer sheet. The 2021–22 season concluded with the Hurricanes winning the Metropolitan Division for the first time in franchise history. This was the first time the Hurricanes had ever won division titles in back-to-back years since relocation. The Hurricanes finished the regular season with 54 wins, the most in franchise history. Andersen and Sebastian Aho each represented the team at the 2022 NHL All-Star Game. In the playoffs, the top-seeded Hurricanes defeated the Boston Bruins in the first round, before falling to the New York Rangers in seven games.

In the following season, the Hurricanes won their division. In the 2023 playoffs, they defeated the New York Islanders in six games in the first round, then defeated the New Jersey Devils in five games in the second round, but were swept by the Florida Panthers in the conference finals.

In the 2023–24 season, the Hurricanes finished second in the division. In the 2024 playoffs, they defeated the Islanders in the first round again, this time in five games, but then got eliminated by the Rangers in six games in the second round despite staving off elimination in the fourth and fifth games. The next season, the Hurricanes again finished second in the division, behind the Capitals. They played against the Devils in the first round of the 2025 playoffs and won the series 4–1. In the second round, the Hurricanes matched up with the division-winning Capitals and again won the series 4–1, advancing to the conference finals for the second time in three years before being eliminated once more by the Panthers, this time in five games.

==== Second Stanley Cup championship (2025–26) ====
In the 2025–26 season, the Hurricanes finished first in the Metropolitan Division as well as first in the Eastern Conference. In the 2026 playoffs, Carolina played the first round against the Ottawa Senators, sweeping the series 4–0. They played the Philadelphia Flyers in the second round and swept the series 4–0 again. This marked the first time any NHL team had gone undefeated in the first two rounds of playoffs since the introduction of the best-of-seven series format in 1987. The Hurricanes had an 11-day break between the last game of the second round and the first game of the conference finals, the longest of any NHL team's break during playoffs since 1919. The Hurricanes won the conference finals in five games, advancing to the Stanley Cup Final for the first time since 2006. They would go on to win their second Stanley Cup over the Vegas Golden Knights with a six-game series win.

== Logos and uniforms ==
The Hurricanes' primary logo has always been a stylized hurricane with a storm warning flag on a hockey stick as the secondary logo. A stylized black triangle sat behind the flag, referencing the Triangle region. After the team's first season in 1997, the team altered the color scheme to a slightly darker shade of red and kept the other colors.

The Carolina Hurricanes currently wear black uniforms at home and white uniforms on the road. While black is one of the team's core colors, until 2022, the Hurricanes kept its usage at a minimum, opting for red helmets, red shirts, and red pants while using black exclusively as a trim color along with silver. Nevertheless, the Hurricanes have worn black alternate uniforms for select games since 2007.

=== Original uniforms ===
The initial Hurricanes uniforms featured the primary logo in front with the secondary logo on the shoulders. One enduring feature of this uniform was the red and black storm warning flags that dot the tail along with silver, red, black and white stripes. In 2000, black trim was added on the player's name, and upon moving to Reebok's Edge template in 2007, piping was added on the shoulder yoke.

In 2008, the Hurricanes unveiled their first black alternate uniform, featuring the flag logo in front and the primary logo (recolored to dark grey) on the shoulders. As with the primary uniforms, warning flag patterns dot the tail, albeit recolored to silver and black. "V" stripes of red and silver accent the sleeves and socks.

=== New looks ===
In 2013, the Hurricanes replaced their primary uniforms with a new set. The biggest changes for these uniforms included the omission of black and silver. On the red uniform, black was relegated exclusively to the neck piping, letter trim and logo, while on the white uniform, it was featured more prominently on the numbers and striping. Silver was almost completely removed from both the red and white uniforms except for the logo outline. In addition, a red nameplate with white letters and black trim was placed near the red shoulder yoke of the white uniforms. Both sets removed the flag logo and warning flag patterns while letters were updated to Univers Condensed font. The front logo also reduced in size compared to the prior set. Despite these changes, the Hurricanes continued to wear the prior black alternate uniform with this new set.

Upon moving to Adidas' AdiZero template in 2017, the Hurricanes made little changes to their white uniform. However, their new red uniform brought back a few elements from the original set, including black striping and the warning flag pattern (now recolored with a dark red shade) on the tail.

In 2018, the Hurricanes unveiled a new black alternate uniform, featuring an updated flag logo corrected to a hurricane warning flag. This flag logo also became the new additional logo. On the dark grey shoulder yoke, the primary logo was placed on the right while the Flag of North Carolina was added to the left. Both logos were recolored in black and grey. The logo also features the state of North Carolina in the negative space between the flags. This alternate has since become the Hurricanes' primary home uniform during the playoffs.

In 2019, a new white uniform was released, replacing the one worn since 2013. This new uniform featured the "CANES" nickname written diagonally in front with the flag logo returning on the shoulders. The warning flag patterns and red letters with black trim also returned from the original set. The new uniform came at the behest of owner Tom Dundon, who was not a fan of the previous white uniform.

The Hurricanes have not worn variants of their uniforms often. On April 5, 2022, the Hurricanes wore their alternate black pants with the white road uniforms for the first time in a game against the Buffalo Sabres. Two nights later, also against the Sabres, the Hurricanes paired their alternate black helmets and pants with the primary red home uniform. On December 23, 2022, against the Pittsburgh Penguins, the Hurricanes began wearing red helmets with the white road uniforms; by 2023, the white road helmets were only worn sporadically, mainly in road games at the Calgary Flames and Detroit Red Wings who primarily wear red helmets at home.

In August 2022, the Hurricanes officially promoted their black uniform to their full time home uniform. They also brought back the original 1997–2007 red uniform as an alternate in commemoration of the 25th anniversary of the franchise in Carolina, wearing it for one season before replacing it with the modern red uniform they last wore in the 2021–22 season. Later that year, the Hurricanes unveiled their second "Reverse Retro" uniform, this time using a red version of the "CANES" diagonal wordmark uniform.

For the Hurricanes' appearances at the 2023 Stadium Series, they wore black uniforms with red accents, but without any white elements. The uniform features the primary logo in front and enlarged numbers.

In 2025, the Hurricanes updated their road white uniform, replacing the "CANES" diagonal wordmark with a recolored version of the Hurricanes logo minus the white elements. Updated fonts taken from the team's wordmark logo was used, along with a new Stormy patch on the right shoulder, and red and black stripes. The design was heavily influenced by the 2023 Stadium Series uniform.

During the 2026–27 season, the Hurricanes wore "Hometown Remix" uniforms featuring the Stormy crest on a gray base with red, silver and black accents.

=== Whalers heritage uniform ===
In 2018, the Hurricanes began wearing green "Heritage" uniforms from the team's Hartford years. In its first season, the throwbacks were used twice, both against the Boston Bruins; for the 2019–20 season, the Hurricanes wore them once at home against the Los Angeles Kings, and in the 2021–22 season, they wore them once against the New Jersey Devils. In 2022–23, the Hurricanes wore the Whalers "Heritage" uniform against the Bruins. During home games with the Whalers uniforms, the Brass Bonanza theme would be played after the horn.

For the 2020–21 season, the Hurricanes wore a "Reverse Retro" uniform, using the template of the 1980s Whalers uniforms but with a grey base - grey being the only color used by both teams - as a nod to the 1992–1997 uniforms.

In the 2023–24 season, the Hurricanes resurrected the white version of the Whalers uniform, wearing them against the Devils. They also wore Cooperalls during warmups as a tribute. The white Whalers uniform returned the following season for one game against the Buffalo Sabres. Then in the 2025–26 season, the Hurricanes wore these uniforms for three games: once at home against the Utah Mammoth, and two games of a home-and-away series against the Colorado Avalanche, who wore their Quebec Nordiques baby blue uniforms in homage to both franchises' WHA and Adams Division history.

== Minor league affiliates ==
=== AHL/IHL ===
- 1979–1980: Springfield Indians
- 1980–1990: Binghamton Whalers
- 1990–1994: Springfield Indians
- 1994–1997: Springfield Falcons
- 1997–1999: Beast of New Haven
- 1999–2001: Cincinnati Cyclones
- 2001–2006: Lowell Lock Monsters
- 2006–2010: Albany River Rats
- 2010–2020: Charlotte Checkers
- 2020–2023: Chicago Wolves
- 2023–2024: None
- 2024–present: Chicago Wolves

=== ECHL ===
- 1998–2019: Florida Everblades
- 2019–2020: Greenville Swamp Rabbits
- 2021−2023: Norfolk Admirals (Note: After the conclusion of the 2022–23 season, the Hurricanes did not renew their formal ECHL affiliation with Norfolk; however, the two teams later announced a working partnership for 2023–24, in addition to Norfolk's formal affiliation with the Winnipeg Jets.)
- 2024–2025: Bloomington Bison (Note: This is a working agreement rather than a formal affiliation.)
- 2025–present: Greensboro Gargoyles

== Season-by-season record ==
This is a list of the last five seasons completed by the Hurricanes. For the full season-by-season history, see List of Carolina Hurricanes seasons

Note: GP = Games played, W = Wins, L = Losses, T = Ties, OTL = Overtime Losses, Pts = Points, GF = Goals for, GA = Goals against

Season	GP	W	L	OTL	Pts	GF	GA	Finish	Playoffs
2021–22	82	54	20	8	116	278	202	1st, Metropolitan	Lost in second round, 3–4 (Rangers)
2022–23	82	52	21	9	113	266	213	1st, Metropolitan	Lost in conference finals, 0–4 (Panthers)
2023–24	82	52	23	7	111	279	216	2nd, Metropolitan	Lost in second round, 2–4 (Rangers)
2024–25	82	47	30	5	99	266	230	2nd, Metropolitan	Lost in conference finals, 1–4 (Panthers)
2025–26	82	53	22	7	113	296	240	1st, Metropolitan	Stanley Cup champions, 4–2 (Golden Knights)

== Players and personnel ==
=== Current roster ===
Updated November 15, 2026

No.	Nat	Player	Pos	S/G	Age	Acquired	Birthplace
20	(Finland)	Sebastian Aho (A)	C	L	29	2015	Rauma, Finland
53	(United States)	Jackson Blake	RW	R	23	2021	Fargo, North Dakota
32	(United States)	Brandon Bussi	G	R	28	2025	Sound Beach, New York
28	(Canada)	William Carrier	LW	L	31	2024	LaSalle, Quebec
5	(United States)	Jalen Chatfield	D	R	30	2021	Ypsilanti, Michigan
44	(Canada)	Nicolas Deslauriers	LW	L	35	2026	LaSalle, Quebec
27	(Denmark)	Nikolaj Ehlers	LW	L	30	2025	Aalborg, Denmark
4	(United States)	Shayne Gostisbehere	D	L	33	2024	Pembroke Pines, Florida
71	(Canada)	Taylor Hall	LW	L	35	2025	Calgary, Alberta
77	(Canada)	Mark Jankowski	C	L	32	2025	Hamilton, Ontario
24	(Canada)	Seth Jarvis	RW	R	24	2020	Winnipeg, Manitoba
52	(Russia)	Pyotr Kochetkov	G	L	27	2019	Penza, Russia
82	(Finland)	Jesperi Kotkaniemi	C	L	26	2021	Pori, Finland
48	(Canada)	Jordan Martinook (A)	LW	L	34	2018	Brandon, Manitoba
19	(United States)	K'Andre Miller	D	L	26	2025	Saint Paul, Minnesota
21	(Russia)	Alexander Nikishin	D	L	25	2020	Oryol, Russia
50	(United States)	Eric Robinson	LW	L	31	2024	Bellmawr, New Jersey
74	(United States)	Jaccob Slavin (A)	D	L	32	2012	Erie, Colorado
11	(Canada)	Jordan Staal (C)	C	L	38	2012	Thunder Bay, Ontario
22	(Canada)	Logan Stankoven	C	R	23	2025	Kamloops, British Columbia
37	(Russia)	Andrei Svechnikov	RW	L	26	2018	Barnaul, Russia
8	(Finland)	Juuso Välimäki	D	L	28	2026	Tampere, Finland
26	(Canada)	Sean Walker	D	R	32	2024	Keswick, Ontario

=== Retired numbers ===
The Carolina Hurricanes have retired four numbers: 2, 10, 12, and 17. In addition, Wayne Gretzky's No. 99 was retired for all NHL teams at the 2000 NHL All-Star Game.

The Hurricanes also honor three numbers within the organization, but do not display their banners publicly:

- 3 – Steve Chiasson (D, 1997–1999), who died in an automobile crash immediately after the 1998–99 season
- 9 – Gordie Howe (RW, 1977–1980)
- 63 – Josef Vašíček (F, 2000–2006), who died in the 2011 Lokomotiv Yaroslavl plane crash

When the Whalers moved to North Carolina to begin the 1997–98 NHL season, they returned the previously retired #2 for Rick Ley (D, 1972–1981) and #19 for John McKenzie (RW, 1977–1979) to circulation, while retaining Gordie Howe's #9 without public display. Glen Wesley (who wore No. 20 in Hartford) was the only Hurricane to wear #2 prior to its re-retirement; #19 has been issued to several players since the move.

Carolina Hurricanes retired numbers
No.	Player	Position	Career	Date of retirement
2	Glen Wesley	D	1994–2003, 2003–2008	February 17, 2009
10	Ron Francis	C	1981–1991, 1998–2004	January 28, 2006
12	Eric Staal	C	2003–2016	January 12, 2025
17	Rod Brind'Amour	C	2000–2010	February 18, 2011

=== Team captains ===
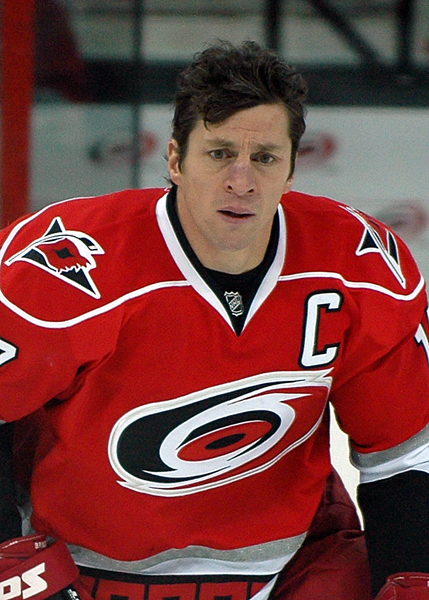
Rod Brind'Amour was the Hurricanes' team captain from 2005 to 2010.

Note: This list of team captains does not include captains from the Hartford Whalers (NHL) and New England Whalers (WHA).

- Kevin Dineen, 1997–1998
- Keith Primeau, 1998–1999
- Ron Francis, 1999–2004
- Rod Brind'Amour, 2005–2010
- Eric Staal, 2010–2016
- Justin Faulk and Jordan Staal, 2017–2018 (co-captains)
- Justin Williams, 2018–2019
- Jordan Staal, 2019–present

=== Hall of Famers ===
- Tom Barrasso played for the team at the beginning of the 2001–02 season before being traded to the Toronto Maple Leafs. He was inducted in 2023.
- Paul Coffey spent one and a half seasons in Carolina near the end of his career (as well as, two seasons prior, 20 games in Hartford). He was inducted into the Hockey Hall of Fame in 2004.
- Ron Francis captained the team in both Hartford and Carolina and spent 15 years with the franchise overall as a player before joining its staff in 2006. He was inducted in 2007.
- Mark Recchi played for the team at the end of the 2005–06 season after being traded by the Pittsburgh Penguins. He was inducted in 2017.
- Jim Rutherford was the president and general manager in both Hartford and Carolina from 1994 to 2014. He was inducted in 2019.

Six members of the Hockey Hall of Fame played for the team before the move to North Carolina: Gordie Howe, Mark Howe, Dave Keon, Bobby Hull, Brendan Shanahan, and Chris Pronger. In addition, longtime franchise radio play-by-play announcer Chuck Kaiton received the Foster Hewitt Memorial Award in 2004, an honor granted by the Hall of Fame.

=== Carolina Hurricanes Hall of Famers ===
The franchise established its own team Hall of Fame ahead of the 2022–23 season to recognize players and off-ice contributors who positively transformed the club.

- Rod Brind'Amour, Ron Francis, and Glen Wesley, automatic induction, 2022
- Cam Ward, first committee-voted player, 2022
- Justin Williams, inducted in 2024
- Eric Staal, inducted in 2025

=== Broadcasters ===
As of the 2026–27 season, Hurricanes games not televised by the NHL's national broadcast partners are carried by the Hurricanes Hockey Network; produced by NHL Productions, the broadcasts are distributed on an ad-hoc basis to part-time channels on participating television providers, including Charter Spectrum and FuboTV. A direct-to-consumer streaming package is also distributed on the Amazon Prime Video platform. The team also announced an agreement with WRAL to carry ten games on broadcast television via either WRAL or WRAZ, as well as a network of affiliates outside of the Raleigh area.

Color commentary is performed by Tripp Tracy, while play-by-play is provided by Mike Maniscalco. Pregame, intermission, and postgame coverage is provided by Shane Willis and Hannah Yates. The Hurricanes simulcast audio from the television broadcasts to a network of four stations fronted by WCMC-FM in Raleigh. Hurricanes games can also be heard on WWNB in New Bern, WECU in Greenville, and WZGV in Charlotte.

Chuck Kaiton was the team's radio play-by-play announcer from 1979 to 2018, dating to the team's days in Hartford. On the television side, John Forslund was the play-by-play voice of the franchise starting in 1995 but left prior to the 2020 Stanley Cup playoffs. He initially moved to NBC, and currently works for TNT and the Seattle Kraken.

=== First-round draft picks ===
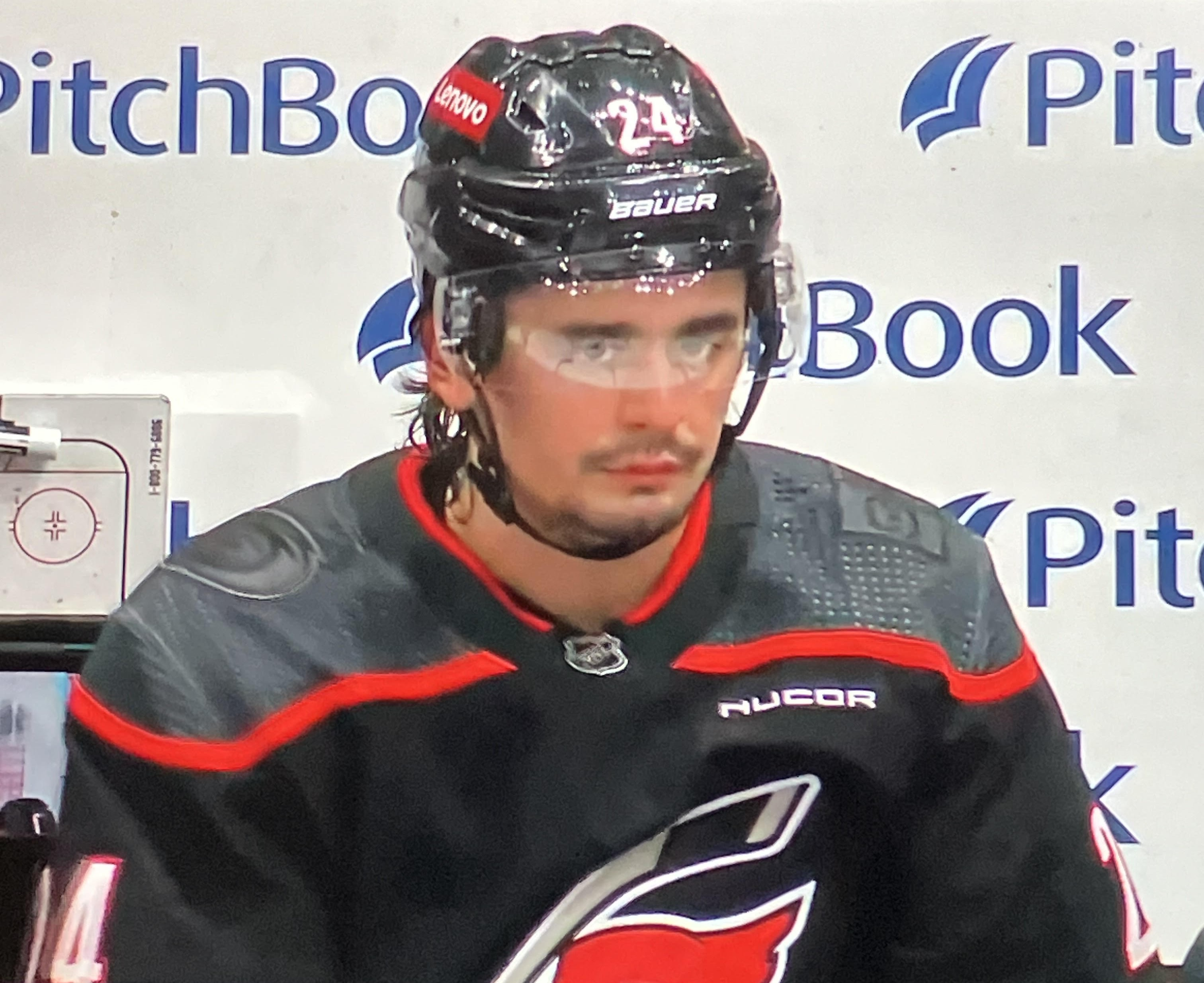
Seth Jarvis, the second most recent first-round draft pick.

Note: This list does not include selections of the Hartford Whalers.

- 1997: Nikos Tselios (22nd overall)
- 1998: Jeff Heerema (11th overall)
- 1999: David Tanabe (16th overall)
- 2001: Igor Knyazev (15th overall)
- 2002: Cam Ward (25th overall)
- 2003: Eric Staal (2nd overall)
- 2004: Andrew Ladd (4th overall)
- 2005: Jack Johnson (3rd overall)
- 2007: Brandon Sutter (11th overall)
- 2008: Zach Boychuk (14th overall)
- 2009: Philippe Paradis (27th overall)
- 2010: Jeff Skinner (7th overall)
- 2011: Ryan Murphy (12th overall)
- 2013: Elias Lindholm (5th overall)
- 2014: Haydn Fleury (7th overall)
- 2015: Noah Hanifin (5th overall)
- 2016: Jake Bean (13th overall), Julien Gauthier (21st overall)
- 2017: Martin Nečas (12th overall)
- 2018: Andrei Svechnikov (2nd overall)
- 2019: Ryan Suzuki (28th overall)
- 2020: Seth Jarvis (13th overall)
- 2023: Bradly Nadeau (30th overall)

== NHL awards and trophies ==
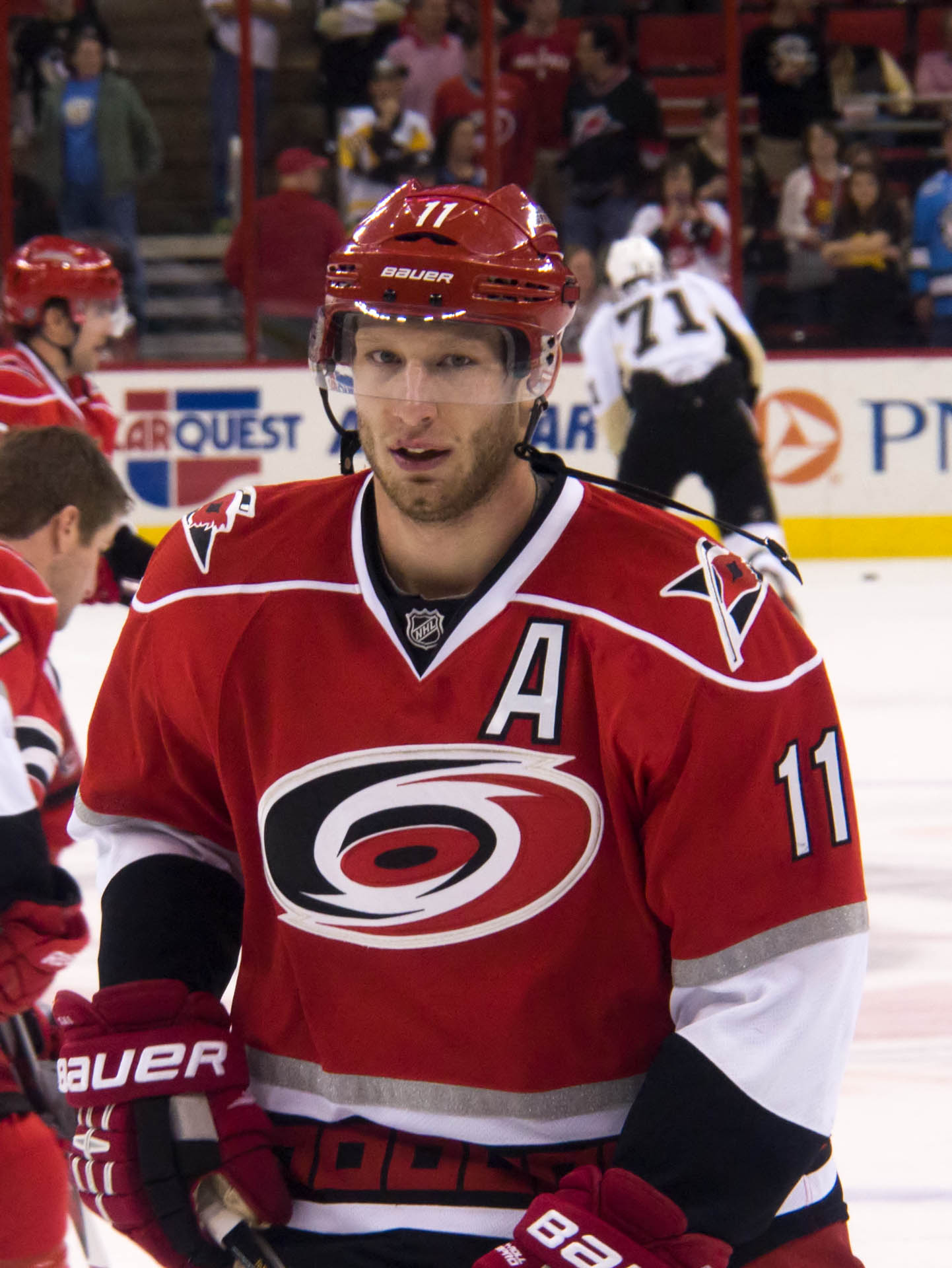
Jordan Staal has won the Conn Smythe Trophy in 2026

Stanley Cup

- 2005–06, 2025–26

Prince of Wales Trophy

- 2001–02, 2005–06, 2025–26

Conn Smythe Trophy

- Cam Ward: 2005–06
- Jordan Staal: 2025–26

Frank J. Selke Trophy

- Rod Brind'Amour: 2005–06, 2006–07

King Clancy Memorial Trophy

- Ron Francis: 2001–02

Lady Byng Memorial Trophy

- Ron Francis: 2001–02
- Jaccob Slavin: 2020–21, 2023–24

Lester Patrick Trophy

- Peter Karmanos Jr.: 1997–98

Calder Memorial Trophy

- Jeff Skinner: 2010–11

Jack Adams Award

- Rod Brind'Amour: 2020–21

William M. Jennings Trophy

- Frederik Andersen: 2021–22
- Antti Raanta: 2021–22

== Franchise records ==
=== Scoring leaders ===
These are the top-ten point-scorers in franchise (Hartford and Carolina) history. Figures are updated after each completed NHL regular season.

- * – current Hurricanes player

Note: Pos = Position; GP = Games played; G = Goals; A = Assists; Pts = Points; P/G = Points per game

Points
Player	Pos	GP	G	A	Pts	P/G
Ron Francis	C	1,186	382	793	1,175	.99
Eric Staal	C	909	322	453	775	.85
Sebastian Aho*	C	756	310	401	711	.94
Kevin Dineen	RW	708	250	294	544	.77
Jordan Staal*	C	972	198	301	499	.51
Rod Brind'Amour	C	694	174	299	473	.68
Andrei Svechnikov*	RW	557	182	252	434	.78
Jeff O'Neill	RW	673	198	218	416	.62
Teuvo Teräväinen	LW	555	138	277	415	.75
Pat Verbeek	RW	433	192	211	403	.93

Goals
Player	Pos	G
Ron Francis	C	382
Eric Staal	C	322
Sebastian Aho*	C	310
Kevin Dineen	RW	250
Blaine Stoughton	RW	219
Jeff Skinner	LW	204
Jeff O'Neill	C	198
Jordan Staal*	C	198
Geoff Sanderson	LW	196
Pat Verbeek	RW	192

Assists
Player	Pos	A
Ron Francis	C	793
Eric Staal	C	453
Sebastian Aho*	C	401
Jordan Staal*	C	301
Rod Brind'Amour	C	299
Kevin Dineen	RW	294
Teuvo Teräväinen	LW	277
Andrew Cassels	C	253
Andrei Svechnikov*	RW	252
Jaccob Slavin*	D	251

=== Goaltending leaders ===
These goaltenders rank in the top ten in franchise (Hartford and Carolina) history for wins. Figures are updated after each completed NHL season.

- * – current Hurricanes player

Note: GP = Games played; W = Wins; L = Losses; T/O = Ties/Overtime losses; GA = Goal against; GAA = Goals against average; SA = Shots against; SV% = Save percentage; SO = Shutouts

Goaltenders
Player	GP	W	L	T/O	GA	GAA	SA	SV%	SO
Cam Ward	668	318	244	84	1,728	2.70	18,989	.909	27
Artūrs Irbe	309	130	122	44	739	2.49	7,884	.906	20
Mike Liut	252	115	111	17	823	3.36	6,963	.882	13
Sean Burke	281	107	131	29	819	3.09	8,425	.903	11
Frederik Andersen	159	98	49	10	383	2.45	4,085	.906	9
Pyotr Kochetkov*	125	71	38	12	295	2.46	3,080	.905	11
Peter Sidorkiewicz	178	71	79	24	575	3.33	4,665	.877	8
Greg Millen	219	62	120	33	919	4.26	6,950	.868	4
Petr Mrázek	92	50	32	8	222	2.48	2,493	.911	10
Antti Raanta	79	46	15	9	183	2.53	1,843	.901	7

=== Individual and team records ===
Note: these records include those from the Hartford Whalers.

==== Individual ====
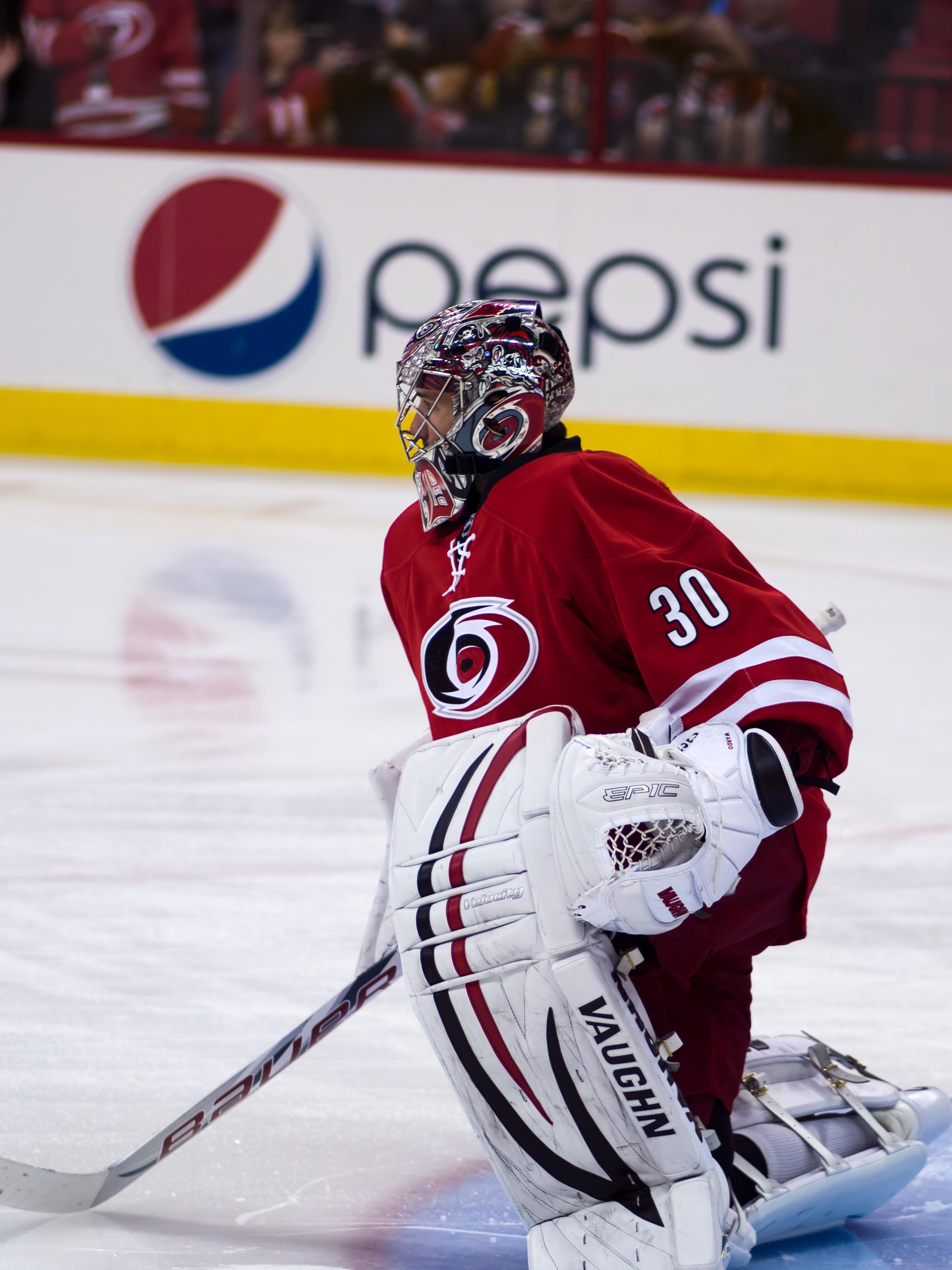
With 39 wins in the 2008–09 season, Cam Ward set the franchise record for most wins by a goaltender in a season.

- Most goals in a season: Blaine Stoughton, 56 (1979–80)
- Most assists in a season: Ron Francis, 69 (1989–90)
- Most points in a season: Mike Rogers, 105 (1979–80, 1980–81)
- Most penalty minutes in a season: Torrie Robertson, 358 (1985–86)
- Most points in a season, defenseman: Mark Howe, 80 (1979–80)
- Most points in a season, rookie: Sylvain Turgeon, 72 (1983–84)
- Fastest hat trick: Ray Whitney, 1 minute 40 seconds (February 8, 2007, vs. Boston Bruins)
- Most shots on goal in one game: Jeff Skinner, 13 (2014)
- Most hat tricks in a season: Eric Staal, 4 (2008–09)
- Most wins in a season: Cam Ward, 39 (2008–09)
- Most shutouts in a season: Artūrs Irbe (1998–99, 2000–01); Kevin Weekes (2003–04); Cam Ward (2008–09), 6
- Most career postseason goals: Sebastian Aho, 39
- Most career postseason points: Sebastian Aho, 97
- Most points in one postseason: Eric Staal, 28 (2006)
- Most shutouts in one postseason: Frederik Andersen, 3 (2026)
- Most career postseason shutouts: Frederik Andersen, 5

==== Team ====
- Most wins in a season: 54 (2021–22)
- Most points in a season: 116 (2021–22)
- Most consecutive wins: 11 (2022–23)
- Most consecutive home wins: 12 (2008–09)
- Most consecutive penalties killed: 36 (Nov. 8—24, 2000 (twice), Dec. 21, 2014—Jan. 19, 2015)
- Best shot differential in a game: 45 (57–12), April 7, 2009, vs. New York Islanders
- Fewest shots on goal by both teams in a period: 6 (3-3) (3rd), October 15, 1999 vs. Vancouver Canucks
- Fewest shots on goal by both teams in a period: 6 (5-1) (3rd), Match 31, 2015 vs. Washington Capitals

== Notes ==
Preceded by Tampa Bay Lightning (2003–04)	Stanley Cup champions 2005–06	Succeeded by Anaheim Ducks
Preceded by Florida Panthers	Stanley Cup champions 2025–26	Succeeded by Incumbent
