= Tripp Tracy =

American ice hockey player and commentator (born 1973)

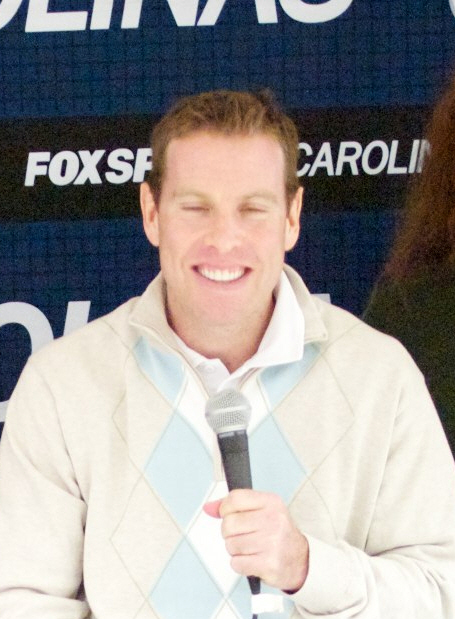
- Tripp Tracy in February 2012
- Born: December 20, 1973 (age 52) Detroit, Michigan, U.S.
- Height: 5 ft 10 in (178 cm)
- Weight: 170 lb (77 kg; 12 st 2 lb)
- Position: Goaltender
- Caught: Right
- Played for: AHL; Springfield Falcons; Beast of New Haven; ECHL; Richmond Renegades
- NHL draft: 218th overall, 1993; Philadelphia Flyers
- Playing career: 1996–1998

Emmet E. "Tripp" Tracy III (born December 20, 1973) is a retired American professional ice hockey goaltender and the current television and radio color commentator for the Carolina Hurricanes.

== Playing career ==
Tracy played junior hockey for the Detroit Compuware Ambassadors of the NAHL for two years and was then a goalie for Harvard University for four years. In his first two seasons at Harvard, he shared goaltending minutes with classmate Aaron Israel; he became the lone starter in 1994, his junior year, when Israel left to join the Philadelphia Flyers' farm system.

Tracy was drafted in the 9th round (218th overall) by the Flyers in the 1993 NHL entry draft. After he graduated from Harvard in 1996, he signed a free agent contract with the Hartford Whalers (who soon after became the Carolina Hurricanes); he played two seasons in the franchise’s farm system, in the ECHL and AHL.

=== Career stats ===
			Regular season									Playoffs
Season	Team	League	GP	W	L	OTL	MIN	GA	SO	GAA	SV%	GP	W	L	MIN	GA	SO	GAA	SV%
1992–93	Harvard	NCAA	17	13	2	2	1055	40	3	2.77	.915	—	—	—	—	—	—	—	—
1993–94	Harvard	NCAA	17	12	3	2	978	49	0	3.01	–	—	—	—	—	—	—	—	—
1994–95	Harvard	NCAA	27	13	12	2	1560	86	0	3.71	–	—	—	—	—	—	—	—	—
1995–96	Harvard	NCAA	30	10	18	1	1746	93	0	3.20	.888	—	—	—	—	—	—	—	—
1996–97	Springfield Falcons	AHL	2	1	1	0	118	7	0	3.56	.887	—	—	—	—	—	—	—	—
1996–97	Richmond Renegades	ECHL	35	18	15	1	2039	109	1	3.21	.900	1	1	0	60	2	0	2.00	.923
1997–98	Beast of New Haven	AHL	4	0	4	0	237	14	0	3.54	.882	—	—	—	—	—	—	—	—
1997–98	Richmond Renegades	ECHL	36	16	14	2	1883	112	1	3.57	.893	–	–	–	–	–	–	–	–
NCAA totals			91	48	35	7	5339	268	3	3.01	–	–	–	–	–	–	–	–	–
Professional totals			77	35	34	3	4277	242	2	3.39	.895	1	1	0	60	2	0	2.00	.923

== Broadcast career ==
After retiring from playing hockey in 1998, Tracy worked briefly for CNN before rejoining the Hurricanes organization as an announcer for the 1998–1999 season. He has been with the Hurricanes' broadcast team ever since.

On April 26, 2022, Tracy made several strange posts on Twitter referencing a personal struggle with alcohol while misspelling several words in the tweets. On April 27, 2022, Carolina Hurricanes President and General Manager Don Waddell said Tracy would miss the remainder of the season and playoffs to address a "personal matter"; Shane Willis, the Hurricanes Director of Youth Hockey and Community Outreach, stepped into Tracy's role alongside play-by-play announcer Mike Maniscalco. Tracy would later come out as a recovering alcoholic and discuss his struggles with sobriety. Tracy returned to the broadcast booth for the start of the 2022–23 NHL season.

On January 7, 2025 it was announced that Tracy shared the title of 2024 North Carolina's Sportscaster of the Year by National Sports Media Association.

== Awards and honors ==
Award	Year
All-ECAC Hockey Rookie Team	1992–93
