= WRDC =

Television station in Durham, North Carolina

ATSC 3.0 station
- Durham–Raleigh–; Fayetteville, North Carolina; United States
- City: Durham, North Carolina
- Channels: Digital: 14 (UHF); Virtual: 28
- Branding: MyRDC, MyRDC28

Programming
- Affiliations: 28.1: Independent with MyNetworkTV; 28.2: Charge!; 28.3: Comet

Ownership
- Owner: Sinclair Broadcast Group; (Raleigh (WRDC-TV) Licensee, Inc.)
- Sister stations: WLFL

History
- First air date: November 4, 1968
- Former call signs: WRDU-TV (1968–1978); WPTF-TV (1978–1991)
- Former channel numbers: Analog: 28 (UHF, 1968–2009); Digital: 27 (UHF, until 2009), 28 (UHF, 2009–2019)
- Former affiliations: NBC (1968–1995); CBS (secondary, 1968–1971); UPN (secondary January−September 1995, primary September 1995–2006)
- Call sign meaning: Raleigh, Durham, and Chapel Hill

Technical information
- Licensing authority: FCC
- Facility ID: 54963
- ERP: 1,000 kW
- HAAT: 624 m (2,047 ft)
- Transmitter coordinates: 35°40′29″N 78°31′39″W

Links
- Public license information: Public file; LMS
- Website: myrdctv.com

WRDC (channel 28) is an independent television station licensed to Durham, North Carolina, United States, serving the Research Triangle area and having a secondary affiliation with MyNetworkTV. It is owned by Sinclair Broadcast Group alongside CW affiliate WLFL (channel 22). The two stations share studios in the Highwoods Office Park, just outside downtown Raleigh; WRDC's transmitter is located in Auburn, North Carolina.

Channel 28 is the third-oldest television station in the Triangle and was the market's NBC affiliate for its first 27 years of operation. It was perennially the third-rated station in the market and did not produce local newscasts for significant portions of its tenure with NBC, which contributed to the network moving to another station in the market, WNCN. After losing NBC in 1995, WRDC became a UPN affiliate, and has carried MyNetworkTV programming from 2006 onward.

== Prior use of channel 28 in Raleigh ==
Channel 28 in Raleigh was initially occupied by WNAO-TV, the first television station in the Raleigh–Durham market and North Carolina's first UHF station. Owned by the Sir Walter Television Company, WNAO-TV broadcast from July 12, 1953, to December 31, 1957, primarily as a CBS affiliate with secondary affiliations with other networks. The station was co-owned with WNAO radio (850 AM and 96.1 FM)), which Sir Walter had bought from The News & Observer newspaper after obtaining the television construction permit. After the Raleigh–Durham market received two VHF television stations in 1954 and 1956 (WTVD, channel 11, and WRAL-TV, channel 5, respectively), WNAO-TV found the going increasingly difficult, as did many early UHF stations. The station signed off December 31, 1957, and its owner entered into a joint venture with another dark UHF outlet that was successful in obtaining channel 8 in High Point.

== History ==
=== WRDU-TV/Triangle Telecasters ===
In 1966, a major overhaul of the UHF allocation table moved the market's channel 28 allotment from Raleigh to Durham. On November 18 of that year, Triangle Telecasters, Inc., a group led by law professor Robinson O. Everett, applied to the Federal Communications Commission (FCC) for a construction permit to build a new channel 28 station in Durham. The Everett group competed with a very similarly named company, Durham–Raleigh Telecasters (owned by the same interests that were building WCTU-TV in Charlotte), which also applied for the channel. Triangle Telecasters won out on April 29, 1968. Everett sold a minority stake to Charles Woods, owner of WTVY-TV in Dothan, Alabama. Other minority partners included then-mayor of Chapel Hill and WCHL founder Roland "Sandy" McClamroch, former Durham mayor E. J. Evans and former Raleigh mayor Jim Reid.

The new channel 28 began broadcasting on the afternoon of November 4, 1968, as WRDU-TV. The station had no single full affiliation: its first programs were an episode of the CBS soap opera Love is a Many Splendored Thing followed by the NBC soaps The Doctors and Another World. The new station's studios were on North Carolina Highway 54 in southern Durham, with a transmitter near Terrells Mountain in Chatham County.

The station's first broadcast day reflected the unusual situation in Raleigh–Durham television and which would ultimately have an impact on federal regulations. By then, the Triangle was one of the largest markets in the country with only two commercial television stations. WRAL-TV aired ABC full-time, while CBS and NBC were shoehorned on WTVD. In 1966, a columnist for the University of North Carolina at Chapel Hill's student newspaper, The Daily Tar Heel, opined that WTVD let NBC programs play a "poor second fiddle" to its primary affiliation with CBS. The area had not been allocated a third commercial VHF station; the nearest NBC affiliates were WITN-TV in Washington and WSJS-TV in Winston-Salem. Even though the All-Channel Receiver Act had only taken effect in 1964, WRDU-TV had one form of compensation the old channel 28 lacked: cable TV. After four years of deliberation by the Raleigh city council, cable came to the city the same year the station launched, and WRDU was picked up by the Raleigh and Burlington cable systems almost as soon as it went on the air.

Even with a third station on the air, NBC allowed WTVD to retain right of first refusal for NBC programming. This situation allowed WTVD to continue its established practice of selecting the higher-rated NBC and CBS programs (just as WTVD had selected the higher-rated CBS and ABC programs when WNAO-TV was in business), leaving WRDU to carry the lower-rated shows from those networks as well as NBC's news programming. By November 1969, this situation prompted Triangle Telecasters to petition the FCC for recourse against WTVD taking shows back from them that they had previously rejected. In 1971, the FCC ruled in favor of Triangle Telecasters (in part due to the commission's then-policy of protecting the development of UHF stations), setting a precedent for similar cases elsewhere. The ruling forced WTVD to choose one network; it ultimately chose CBS, forcing NBC to sign with WRDU-TV by default ahead of the 1971–1972 television season.

NBC's affiliation with WRDU meant that Triangle television viewers, for the first time, finally saw the full schedules of all three networks on separate stations. However, it consigned NBC to a weaker UHF station in terms of personnel, programming, and signal. Channel 28's transmitter was located on the Orange–Chatham County line on the market's western fringe, providing only a Grade B signal to Raleigh proper and rendering it practically unviewable over the air in southern and eastern Wake County. In May 1969, WRDU set up a translator on channel 70 to improve its coverage in eastern Wake County; in 1972, that translator moved to channel 22 and from the top of the BB&T Building in downtown Raleigh to the top of a newly constructed retirement home nearby. Even then, one writer once called the signal "weak as a Carrie Nation cocktail".

Another problem of WRDU's early years was Triangle Telecasters's frequent preemption of network shows for syndicated programs. The Everetts believed they could get more revenue from local advertising than from network airtime payments, due to WRDU's low ratings keeping compensation rates very low in turn. The preemptions only increased during NBC's 1970s ratings struggles. At the time, NBC was considerably less tolerant of its stations substituting alternative programming for its feed than ABC or CBS. However, when NBC demanded that Triangle Telecasters clear the entire network schedule with no preemptions, the Everetts turned them down. NBC was in no position to do anything about it because of the lack of competition in the market. One time WRDU chose not to preempt a network program, it still faced criticism for different reasons; local religious leaders objected to the airing of Franco Zeffirelli's mini-series Jesus of Nazareth, arguing it would offend their beliefs. This was even though WRDU not only held the local rights to The PTL Club, but frequently preempted NBC programming in order to air Billy Graham crusades. The station was also the Triangle's home for the Jerry Lewis MDA Labor Day Telethon until 1979, when it moved to WTVD.

=== WPTF-TV/Durham Life era ===
Without a sale, WRDU would have gone off the air.

— unnamed Durham Life representative quoted in The News & Observer in 1977 as to why the company was buying a money-losing station

By 1975, though it had outlived the original channel 28, the Everetts were running out of money and wanted out. Realizing that the station was on the verge of shutting down, the family began to look for a new owner. Despite WRDU's ratings struggles, at least three large media groups saw enough promise in the station to consider buying it, among them Scripps–Howard Broadcasting. After two years of negotiations, the Durham Life Insurance Company—which owned WPTF, the Triangle's oldest radio station, and WQDR-FM—bought WRDU-TV from the Everetts in May 1977 and changed its call sign to WPTF-TV on August 14, 1978.

This was Durham Life's second attempt to get into television. It was one of two applicants for channel 5 in the 1950s and had gone as far as buying cameras and rehearsing announcers. However, the FCC shocked Durham Life when it awarded the license to the much smaller Capitol Broadcasting, owner of WRAL-AM-FM radio, as WRAL-TV. Before buying channel 28, Durham Life had been interested in building a new station on channel 22, a Raleigh assignment that had been proposed for a station in the 1960s.

Durham Life had far more financial resources than Triangle Telecasters could have ever managed and invested a considerable amount of money into its new purchase. It built a new 1,300-foot (400 m) transmitter tower near Apex that gave the renamed WPTF-TV a coverage area comparable to those of WRAL-TV and WTVD. It also started a full news department—Woody Durham, the play-by-play voice of North Carolina Tar Heels sports, served as sports director—and purchased $500,000 in new equipment. It also added a weekday children's show entitled Barney's Army, which was hosted by the namesake Aniforms puppet and ran from 1979 to 1983, long after the genre had disappeared from most other American stations. The show consisted of short interstitials between cartoons and other children's shows, a viewer call-in game called TV Powww along with local musical acts and educational segments. This youth-centered daytime schedule came at the expense of the NBC soap opera Another World, which did not air on the station during its 90-minute expansion from 1979 to 1980; a station representative argued the syndicated shows were more profitable. The preemption of Another World came amid vehement opposition from the network and angry calls and letters from viewers who had actually watched the show on WPTF. Meanwhile, the next closest stations still playing the show in its regular time slot were WECT in Wilmington, WITN-TV in Greenville, and WAVY-TV in Portsmouth, Virginia, all of which were VHF stations. Likewise, the station's removal of Texas prompted viewer outrage; less than a year later, the station added the show back when the network moved it to a mid-morning time slot. NBC canceled it along with The Doctors: WPTF was the only NBC affiliate in North Carolina that still aired the latter show.

Amid indications that Durham Life was as willing to preempt NBC programming as the Everetts had been despite a more powerful signal, channel 28 still faced the audience-loyalty problems it had under Triangle Telecasters. As NBC's ratings slump worsened, WPTF's already frosty relationship with NBC became even chillier. Even the network's few hits at the time, such as Diff'rent Strokes and The Rockford Files, performed poorly for the station, a problem compounded when NBC programming head Fred Silverman's theory of a "living schedule" did not generate the same success as it did at ABC. Channel 28's stronger signal did not result in a boost for its news ratings; in November 1979, WRAL's 6 p.m. newscast attracted a 30 rating, WTVD's a 16, and WPTF-TV's a measly 1. In 1981, Durham Life reorganized as a holding company, Durham Corporation; the reorganized company fended off two hostile takeover attempts later in the decade. While the radio stations continued to make money, the broadcasting division posted losses because of channel 28. Durham Life also continued to preempt NBC programming, albeit less often than in the 1970s. Citing a scheduling problem with a syndicated special, WPTF-TV preempted Maya Angelou's TV movie Sister, Sister when NBC aired it, despite it being set in North Carolina and Angelou teaching at Wake Forest University. The station defended its programming philosophy by pointing to its most acclaimed and popular examples of first-run syndicated programs, such as The Muppet Show, and TV movies from Operation Prime Time.

Channel 28 also justified its reliance on syndicated programs by pointing out how they got higher ratings than its nightly news broadcasts. WPTF-TV dropped its 11 p.m. newscast in 1982, moving its early-evening newscast to 5:30 and delaying the NBC Nightly News to 7 p.m. so it could air Star Trek instead. It also dropped NBC News Overnight, arguing to a local newspaper that the station would lose money on the show compared to just showing nothing at all and signing off after Late Night with David Letterman. The following year, longform evening newscasts were dropped altogether, replaced with brief cut-ins throughout the day. The closest thing to a newscast on the station was a half-hour weekday newsmagazine, North Carolina Today.

WRAL and WTVD switched affiliations in 1985 after WTVD's owner, Capital Cities Communications, bought ABC. Despite an ad campaign designed to poke fun at the change, saying "you know where to find us" to point out that NBC was still in the same place, WPTF-TV saw practically no windfall from the switch. By the mid-to-late 1980s, even with NBC's powerful prime time lineup leading the network to first place only two years after finishing last, WPTF-TV remained stubbornly last in the Triangle television ratings. It even trailed WLFL, an independent station (and later, a Fox affiliate) that had only been on the air since 1981. Meanwhile, preemptions of NBC shows continued unabated. The station even preempted the popular prime time dramas Hill Street Blues and St. Elsewhere, prompting over 400 angry calls and letters to the station. One short-lived NBC daytime show called Fantasy went to UNC–Chapel Hill to hold auditions for guests despite the fact that WPTF-TV refused to air it. The show was canceled after only one season. By this time, NBC was running out of patience with WPTF-TV. According to Electronic Media magazine, the network had begun "continuing courtship" of WRAL-TV, a station that rejected the network's overtures out of a desire to avoid a second affiliation switch in three years, going as far as sweetening the deal by offering the NBC affiliation in Charlotte to Capitol's newly-built WJZY with WRAL, which would in turn resolve NBC's continued issues with WPCQ-TV (now WCNC-TV) in that market.

Durham Corporation was able to make progress and begin making money again in its broadcasting unit in the 1980s. Full-length evening newscasts returned in 1986, and a year later the company moved WPTF-AM-TV and WQDR to new quarters in the Highwoods office complex costing $1 million. However, it still made very little difference in the ratings. The 6 p.m. edition of Newsbeat 28 not only saw no improvement on the same low ratings it garnered in the previous decade, but it trailed reruns on WLFL of the former NBC sitcom Gimme a Break!, with WTVD and WRAL maintaining their leads. The next year, WPTF-TV appeared on the cable system in Fayetteville for the first time, a move cited as key in increasing station circulation and giving it more parity with WRAL and WTVD. During this decade, the station broke new ground by broadcasting in 3D and stereo sound before the other stations (and in the case of the latter, ahead of the network itself) while also being the first station in the area to accept condom ads.

In August 1989, Durham Corporation opted to focus on its core insurance business and announced it was placing WPTF-TV up for sale. Durham Life sought as much as $45 million for the station. Nature, however, derailed the station's attempts to turn its fortunes around. On December 10, 1989, WPTF-TV's three-year-old tower near Auburn collapsed in an ice storm that also brought down the nearby tower of WRAL-TV. The next day, Durham Corporation took WPTF-TV off the market due to the collapse; it had received lesser offers than it had expected. The first signs of trouble came earlier that year when a less severe ice storm still proved strong enough to knock the station off the air for 10 hours so maintenance workers could replace parts of a damaged transmission line. After temporarily broadcasting some programs over WYED-TV (channel 17) from Goldsboro and WFCT (channel 62) in Fayetteville, WPTF reactivated its old transmission facility near Apex, which it had used from 1978 to 1986, allowing the station to resume its broadcasts on channel 28 as usual. That same tower was dismantled several years later and then donated to classical radio station WCPE-FM, who reassembled it at a spot near its studios in Wake Forest in 1993. In 1991, WPTF-TV joined WRAL-TV on a newly built 1,989-foot (606 m) broadcast tower at the latter's previous site, which also housed the signals for WRAL-FM, WQDR-FM, and several local low-power television stations.

Even when WPTF-TV began broadcasting on its own signal again, its nightly newscasts remained in the ratings basement, frequently being trounced by the newscasts on WRAL-TV and WTVD and reruns on WLFL. The station had also lost some ratings momentum with the tower collapse. In September 1990, channel 28 tried moving the 6 p.m. newscast to 7 p.m., displacing Hard Copy (a rare ratings success for the station) and airing after NBC Nightly News instead of before it, with Cheers reruns taking its old time slot. By this time, lead anchor and producer Terry Thill had been replaced by Ben Garrett. Moving the early newscast failed to improve ratings, as it now had to compete with Jeopardy! on WTVD and Entertainment Tonight on WRAL. By this time, their higher-rated competitors were also airing pre-6 p.m. newscasts. The firing of Thill ultimately proved to be a grim harbinger of things to come for the news division. On top of that, the whole of Durham Life Broadcasting was suffering bad publicity due to Laurel Smith, general manager of WQDR-FM, facing accusations of sexual harassment by male employees while she was also involved in a child custody case with her ex-husband; a memo by company president Felton P. Coley told employees of the company's radio and TV stations, WPTF-TV included, not to talk about it publicly, a point made moot when she resigned.

=== Sale to FSF TV ===
We have never seen a network affiliate with local news as low-rated as it was here. We could have quadrupled our spending on it and it would not make any progress.

— Paul Brissette, early 1990s owner of WRDC, on the motive for axing the station's news department

While the company initially announced plans to retain its broadcasting properties, the interest of buyers in Durham Life itself resulted in a deal. Bev W. Landstreet III, an investor from Nashville, Tennessee, and owner of Financial Securities Fund L.P., had been attempting to buy Durham Corporation and its $8.2 billion portfolio of life insurance policies since 1983. When Durham instead opted to sell itself to Capital Holding of Louisville, Kentucky, Landstreet got the consolation prize: Durham Life Broadcasting. Landstreet immediately sold the radio stations to Curtis Media Group. He then formed FSF TV, Inc. to acquire channel 28, with Paul Brissette, a Boca Raton, Florida-based investor and president of Adams Television, as a minority partner. The new owners hired Vickie Street—former general manager of Adams-owned WWAY, the ABC affiliate in Wilmington—as general manager, answering directly to Brissette. Almost as soon as FSF took control in late July 1991, Brissette canceled the evening newscasts and fired virtually the entire news department. The news staffers were told of the decision just before the scheduled start of the 7 p.m. newscast and given just two hours to pack their things. Station officials said that the newscasts had not budged from last place despite numerous attempts at improvements. Brissette said that the newscasts' ratings were the most anemic he had seen in all of his years in television; they only attracted a two percent share at the time of their cancellation. This led Brissette and Landstreet to conclude that it would not be worth the effort to spend the money it would take to make the newscasts viable. Brissette also shuttered the public affairs department. The call sign was then changed to WRDC on October 25, 1991, after the three major cities in the Triangle (Raleigh, Durham, and Chapel Hill); the station branded as "TRI-28" (later rendered as "TRY-28").

FSF was able to make the station profitable almost immediately but faced the perception that it believed in making money rather than being a part of the community. In particular, the loss of news programming assured little to no goodwill from NBC about the future direction of the station. One disgruntled ex-employee bitterly suggested that the station's new call sign stood for "We Really Don't Care", while another compared the situation to the last episode of The Mary Tyler Moore Show in which the new owners of the fictional WJM fired all the employees of the nightly newscast except Ted Baxter. Some argued that a last-place newscast was better than nothing and that the Triangle needed more than two functioning news departments to adequately cover the market. Meanwhile, several stations in which Brissette had controlling interest not only had full-fledged newscasts but successful ones as well. The station continued to employ a single anchor/reporter to helm local cut-ins that would air in and around NBC network shows and syndicated programming. Even these news briefs were canceled in 1994, two years after WLFL had launched a 10 p.m. newscast, leaving WRDC as little more than a "pass-through" for network and syndicated programming. However, like its predecessors, FSF continued to preempt NBC shows to make more money off of airing Billy Graham crusades and other fare.

=== Switch from NBC to UPN ===
In March 1994, FSF sold channel 28 to Communications Corporation of America, headed by Tom Galloway. Despite hopes that Galloway would do something to fix what News & Observer media critic Bob Langford called "the worst NBC affiliate in the country", the ownership change would not be enough to save channel 28's affiliation with NBC. By this time, NBC's patience with WRDC had been exhausted after over a quarter-century of mediocrity at best on channel 28. It had perennially been one of NBC's weakest affiliates, even during its nationwide ratings dominance. The station's lackluster ratings in what had become one of the fastest-growing markets in the country were a particular embarrassment for a network still capitalizing on the success of the Must See TV campaign. Continuing preemptions and Brissette's all-but-nonexistent commitment to local news did not help matters.

NBC began to look to move its programming to another station at the end of its affiliation agreement with channel 28. Unlike in the 1970s, the establishment of new television stations in the Triangle and cable leveling the playing field between VHF and UHF outlets gave NBC flexibility in selecting a new local outlet for its programs. In 1994, NBC selected WYED-TV (soon to become WNCN), licensed to Goldsboro but located just outside Raleigh in Clayton. WNCN had recently boosted its signal to 5 million watts to provide greater coverage to the Triangle. Additionally, channel 17's new owner, Outlet Communications, had very good relations with NBC; it owned WJAR-TV in Providence, Rhode Island, and WCMH-TV in Columbus, Ohio, which were two of NBC's strongest and longest-standing affiliates. Although WNCN had just affiliated with the new WB Television Network, NBC quickly cut a deal with Outlet to move its Triangle affiliation to WNCN on October 1, 1995, the day channel 28's affiliation agreement expired.

WRDC took on a secondary affiliation with UPN when that network launched in January. However, in anticipation of the switch, it began branding itself as "UPN 28" and all but stopped promoting NBC programming outside network hours; it also delayed UPN's Monday and Tuesday night slates to air on Friday and Saturday nights instead of NBC's weak prime time lineup, which WNCN aired on those nights until September.

The switchover took place on September 11, 1995—a month earlier than planned, by mutual agreement between the two stations—ending a 27-year partnership between channel 28 and NBC under four different owners. WNCN became the sole NBC affiliate in the Triangle, while WRDC became an exclusive UPN affiliate. That fall, the WB affiliation intended for WNCN went to newly launched WRAZ (channel 50), owned by Tar Heel Broadcasting and operated by WRAL-TV under a local marketing agreement, with the understanding that the new station would switch affiliations with WLFL three years later. In the wake of the switch, WRDC picked up several syndicated shows that WNCN no longer had time to air. This left WRDC with mostly talk shows on its daytime lineup. By then, Communications Corporation of America had contracted with Sinclair Broadcast Group, which was purchasing WLFL, to combine the two stations' operations under a local marketing agreement; Sinclair provided CCA 98 percent of the money to buy channel 28. The merged operation was housed at the former WRDC facility. WRDC was then sold to Glencairn Ltd., nominally headed by former Sinclair executive Edwin Edwards. However, the Smith family, founders and owners of Sinclair, held 97% of Glencairn's stock; for all intents and purposes, Sinclair now owned both stations. Similar arrangements were in place at Glencairn's other eight stations, leading to allegations that Sinclair was using Glencairn to make an end-run around FCC rules forbidding television station duopolies. Ties between WRDC and Sinclair were apparent even before the sale to Glencairn; Sinclair had put up 98 percent of the money Communications Corporation of America had used to buy WRDC. The FCC eventually fined Sinclair $40,000 for its illegal control of Glencairn but approved its direct acquisition of the Glencairn stations in 2001, after duopolies were legalized.

=== As a MyNetworkTV affiliate ===
On January 24, 2006, Time Warner and CBS Corporation announced that The WB and UPN would merge their higher-rated programs onto a new network, The CW. The news of the merger resulted in Sinclair announcing, two months later, that most of its UPN and WB affiliates, including WRDC, would join MyNetworkTV, a new service formed by News Corporation, which also owned the Fox network. WLFL, which had been a WB affiliate since 1998, took the CW affiliation a few months later.

On May 15, 2012, Sinclair and Fox agreed to a five-year affiliation agreement extension for Sinclair's 19 Fox-affiliated stations until 2017. This included an option, exercisable between July 1, 2012, and March 31, 2013, for Fox parent News Corporation to buy a combination of six Sinclair-owned stations (two CW/MyNetworkTV duopolies and two standalone MyNetworkTV affiliates) in three out of four markets; WLFL and WRDC were included in the Fox purchase option, along with stations in Cincinnati (WSTR-TV), Norfolk (WTVZ) and Las Vegas (KVCW and KVMY). In January 2013, Fox announced that it would not exercise its option to buy any of the Sinclair stations in the four aforementioned markets.

== Technical information ==
=== Subchannels ===
The station's ATSC 1.0 channels are carried on the multiplexed signals of other Raleigh–Durham television stations:

Subchannels provided by WRDC (ATSC 1.0)
Subchannel	Res.	Short name	Programming	ATSC 1.0 host
28.1	720p	WRDC-MY	Main WRDC programming	WLFL
28.2	480i	Charge	Charge!	WNCN
28.3	480i	COMET	Comet	WTVD

=== Analog-to-digital conversion ===
WRDC ended regular programming on its analog signal, over UHF channel 28, on February 17, 2009, five months ahead of the official date on which full-power television stations in the United States transitioned from analog to digital broadcasts under federal mandate. It was one of three stations in the Triangle market, along with WLFL and WRAY-TV, that decided to switch on that date, even though the official transition date had been changed to June 12, 2009. Although it had an assigned digital channel that it would move to post-transition that differed from its original digital channel, WRDC continued to broadcast its digital signal on its pre-transition allocation (UHF channel 27). At noon on June 12, the station's digital signal relocated to UHF channel 28.

=== ATSC 3.0 lighthouse ===
WRDC serves as one of two ATSC 3.0 (Next Gen TV) stations in the Triangle, launching in November 2020. WRDC's transmitter is located in Auburn, North Carolina.

Subchannels of WRDC (ATSC 3.0)
Subchannel	Res.	Short name	Programming
11.1	720p	WTVDNG	ABC (WTVD)
17.1	1080p	WNCNNG	CBS (WNCN)
22.1	720p	WLFLNG	The CW (WLFL)
22.10	1080p	T2	T2
22.11	1080p	PBTV	Pickleball TV
22.20		GMLOOP	GameLoop
22.21		ROXi	ROXi
28.1	720p	WRDCNG	Main WRDC programming
40.1	1080p	WUVCNG	Univision (WUVC-DT)

Subchannel streamed via the Internet
