= WCMC-FM =

Radio station in Raleigh, North Carolina

- Holly Springs, North Carolina; United States
- Broadcast area: Raleigh–Durham; Research Triangle
- Frequency: 99.9 MHz (HD Radio)
- Branding: 99.9 The Fan

Programming
- Format: Sports
- Subchannels: HD1: WCMC-FM analog; HD2: WDNC simulcast (sports); HD3: WDUR simulcast (Indian/South Asian); HD4: Simulcast of HD3
- Affiliations: ESPN Radio; Carolina Hurricanes; Charlotte FC

Ownership
- Owner: Capitol Broadcasting Company; (WCMC-FM, LLC)
- Sister stations: WDNC; WRAL; WRAL-TV; WRAZ; WNGT-CD

History
- First air date: 1993
- Former call signs: WFXQ (1990–2005)
- Call sign meaning: "Country Music for Carolina" (previous format)

Technical information
- Licensing authority: FCC
- Facility ID: 51760
- Class: C2
- ERP: 26,500 watts
- HAAT: 206 meters (676 ft)
- Transmitter coordinates: 35°40′35.6″N 78°32′7″W

Links
- Public license information: Public file; LMS
- Webcast: Listen live
- Website: www.wralsportsfan.com

WCMC-FM (99.9 MHz) is a sports radio station based in Raleigh, North Carolina and licensed to nearby Holly Springs. Its studios are located in north Raleigh along with WRAL, an adult contemporary music station, and sports talk station WDNC (which is simulcast on WCMC-FM HD2). All are owned and operated by Capitol Broadcasting Company which also owns NBC television affiliate WRAL-TV, Fox affiliate WRAZ, and the Durham Bulls minor-league baseball team, among other properties.

WCMC-FM transmits from an antenna located in the Auburn community southeast of Raleigh, on a tower shared with WRDC, WRAL FM, and WQDR-FM. The station also broadcasts in HD Radio.

== History ==
Prior to 2005, this station was WFXQ in Chase City, Virginia, one of several southern Virginia stations purchased by former Raleigh radio host Tom Joyner in 2001. It first signed on in early 1993 as a country music station known as "99.9 The Fox". During Joyner's years as owner, the station was black gospel as "Rejoice Radio 99.9" and adult standards as "Stardust 99.9". Joyner sold WFXQ to Capitol Broadcasting Company, and the Stardust format moved to WSHV in South Hill, Virginia, one of several Joyner-owned stations purchased by Lakes Media. WFXQ got permission to move its city of license to Creedmoor and increase its power to 22,000 watts.

WCMC-FM signed on the air in October 2005 with a country music format called "99.9 Genuine Country". The slogan was "Country Favorites From Today and Yesterday" and it played a mix of new country and older country

In October 2006, WCMC-FM moved to another tower, taller than the previous one, but reduced its power to 8,000 watts.

On September 10, 2007, at 9 PM, WCMC-FM began stunting with a classic rock format. On October 10, at 3 PM, the sports format debuted, known as "99.9 The Fan". In September 2009, Capitol Broadcasting purchased WDNC from McClatchey broadcasting. Along with the purchase came nearly the entire staff of WDNC's sister station WRBZ. Brian Maloney, who started the sports talk format in the Raleigh-Durham market and was the general manager of WDNC/WRBZ, was hired by Capitol to spearhead the integration of both WDNC and WCMC-FM.

Since moving to the Triangle, WCMC-FM had broadcast from an antenna located 485 feet (148 m) above ground level located three miles northwest of Youngsville. The short tower and relatively modest power resulted in the station providing only grade B coverage to Chapel Hill, Garner, Cary and most of Durham. In 2010 WCMC-FM was granted permission to move its city of license to Holly Springs and boost its power to 26,500 watts, providing a fairly strong city-grade signal to all of Wake County and most of Durham County. However, Chapel Hill, the third point in the Triangle, still gets only a grade B signal. This may be due to the need to protect WMAG in High Point, at nearby 99.5.

On June 16, 2015, WCMC-FM was awarded North Carolina Large Market Station of the Year by the North Carolina Association of Broadcasters. In 2016, WCMC-FM was a national finalist for Sports Station of The Year by the National Association of Broadcasters.

== HD channels ==
On February 29, 2016, WCLY relaunched as an English-language sports station, "1550 the Ticket". The station featured a mix of sports programming from ESPN Radio, CBS Sports Radio, and Fox Sports Radio, which also aired on the WCMC-FM HD3 channel. ESPN Deportes continued to air on HD4.

On May 1, 2018, WDNC rebranded from "The Buzz" (which continued on WCMC-FM HD2 and the 96.5 and 99.3 translators) to "The Ticket" (moved from WCLY and still aired on the WCMC-FM HD3 channel).

On its HD4 channel, WCMC-FM rebroadcasts Durham-based WDUR 1490 AM's South Asia Radio format.

On August 4, 2022, the HD2 programming was dropped from the 96.5 and 99.3 translators.

== Sports ==
WCMC-FM has been the flagship station for the Carolina Hurricanes since 2007, following a two-year run on Curtis Media-owned WWMY. Following the retirement of longtime radio commentator Chuck Kaiton the games were a straight simulcast of the audio feed from FanDuel Sports South and FanDuel Sports Southeast (formerly Fox Sports Carolinas). In addition, the station broadcasts the weekly football and basketball coaches shows for the NC State Wolfpack, while sister station WRAL broadcasts the games.

On November 30, 2008, WCMC-FM became an ESPN Radio affiliate. This followed the decision by McClatchey Broadcasting to discontinue ESPN programming on its two sports talk stations, WDNC and WRBZ, because of ESPN's insistence on the stations airing more ESPN programming than the company wanted to. This dispute ended when Capitol bought WDNC.

On April 1, 2009, WCMC-FM became the new flagship station of the Durham Bulls. It was expected to carry the full allotment of 144 during the season, along with playoff games, although some games may be moved over to their HD channel on dates that might conflict with a Carolina Hurricanes broadcast.

On May 13, 2010, it was announced that WCMC-FM would become the Triangle affiliate for the Carolina Panthers.

On March 19, 2020, it was announced that the "Adam & Joe Show" would end. About a month later, "The OG" had their first air date featuring longtime WCMC-FM host Joe Ovies and former 'News & Observer sportswriter Joe Giglio. On April 26, 2023, it was announced that "The OG" would end; Ovies and Giglio were both released as part of cost-cutting measures and would later resurrect their show on YouTube and as a podcast.
