= WNCN =

Television station in Goldsboro, North Carolina

- Goldsboro–Raleigh–Durham–; Fayetteville, North Carolina; United States
- City: Goldsboro, North Carolina
- Channels: Digital: 8 (VHF); Virtual: 17
- Branding: CBS 17

Programming
- Affiliations: 17.1: CBS; for others, see § Subchannels

Ownership
- Owner: Nexstar Media Group; (Nexstar Media Inc.)

History
- First air date: April 11, 1988
- Former call signs: WYED (1988–1994)
- Former channel numbers: Analog: 17 (UHF, 1988–2009); Digital: 55 (UHF, 1999–2009), 17 (UHF, 2009–2020)
- Former affiliations: Independent (1988–1995); The WB (January–September 1995); NBC (secondary February–September 1995; primary September 1995–2016)
- Call sign meaning: "North Carolina's News"

Technical information
- Licensing authority: FCC
- Facility ID: 50782
- ERP: 29 kW
- HAAT: 624.1 m (2,048 ft)
- Transmitter coordinates: 35°40′29″N 78°31′39″W

Links
- Public license information: Public file; LMS
- Website: www.cbs17.com

WNCN (channel 17) is a television station licensed to Goldsboro, North Carolina, United States, serving as the CBS affiliate for the Research Triangle area. Owned by Nexstar Media Group, the station maintains studios on Front Street in north Raleigh and its transmitter is located in Auburn, North Carolina.

Built in 1988 as a second-tier independent station operating from studios in Clayton, North Carolina, under the call sign WYED, channel 17 was purchased by Outlet Communications in 1994 and replaced the anemic WRDC (channel 28) as the market's NBC affiliate in 1995, which included the establishment of a local newsroom and the adoption of the present WNCN call letters. NBC owned the station for more than a decade before spinning it off to Media General in 2006. WNCN became the new CBS affiliate for the Triangle market on February 29, 2016, switching with longtime CBS affiliate WRAL-TV, which had announced it would become the new NBC affiliate for the region.

== History ==
=== Early history ===
In 1983, three parties applied to build a television station on channel 17 in Goldsboro, North Carolina: Group H Broadcasting, owned by Randall G. Harvey of Hardeeville, South Carolina; Wayne Telecasters Inc., owned by radio station owner George Beasley alongside the Beasley Broadcast Group; and Friendship Broadcasting of Elizabeth City. The Federal Communications Commission (FCC) gave the nod to Group H in 1984.

The station first signed on the air on April 11, 1988, as WYED. It primarily carried programming from the Home Shopping Network (HSN), along with some religious and syndicated programming. Three months after going on air, WYED was sold to Beasley, becoming the large national radio chain's first and only television property. George Beasley had started his company with the 1961 sign-on of WPYB (1130 AM) in nearby Benson. Channel 17's original studios were located at 622 South Barbour Street in Clayton, with a 1,550-foot (470 m) transmitter tower located nearby, broadcasting with 2.6 million watts of power. The station had limited cable carriage, mainly on smaller providers in the eastern part of the state. Another source of programming for channel 17 was the short-lived Star Television Network, for which it signed on as an affiliate.

WYED was almost sold two years after it started to Elvin Feltner's Krypton Corporation; Feltner proposed a movie-heavy schedule for channel 17. However, a problem developed in another pending Krypton acquisition, of television station WTVX serving West Palm Beach, Florida, which delayed any filing of the license transfer with the FCC. Beasley retained the station, which dropped home shopping in 1991 when HSN cut its payments to affiliated stations to air movies, older syndicated shows, and Baltimore Orioles games. The station's longstanding issue of cable carriage was resolved in 1992 when changes to federal regulations prompted Cablevision to put WYED on its basic lineup in Raleigh and Durham. It did not appear on cable in Fayetteville until February 1995.

For the next two years, WYED continued with a slightly better schedule than it had previously broadcast. In addition, the station dabbled in local sports with the production of several high school football telecasts, as well as a local children's show, Kam and Kids, whose producers were sued by channel 17 for failure to pay for air time.

=== Outlet and NBC ownership ===
Beasley sold WYED in 1994 to Outlet Communications of Providence, Rhode Island, for $5.4 million. Outlet made major changes in programming, affiliated channel 17 with the new WB network, and changed the call sign to WNCN at the start of 1995. The call sign was permanent, but the affiliation was temporary; in November 1994, the station was announced as the new NBC affiliate for the Triangle beginning in the fall of 1995.

Outlet's other two stations, WJAR in Providence and WCMH-TV in Columbus, Ohio, were affiliated with NBC, which was looking for an upgrade in the market. NBC's existing affiliate was WRDC (channel 28), a perennial also-ran in local television whose total-day audience share was less than a third that of the local ABC and CBS affiliates, WRAL-TV (channel 5) and WTVD (channel 11). NBC was also said to be unhappy with the state of news on that station, which had discontinued its news department three years prior. WRDC picked up the UPN affiliation at that network's January 1995 launch and displaced two nights of NBC programming to air UPN fare; those two nights of NBC programs aired on WNCN. Construction began to turn the former WLFL studios on Front Street into a new facility for channel 17, including space for a news department, and on improvements to yield an increase in transmitter power. Meanwhile, Outlet put itself up for sale and accepted a $396 million offer from NBC in August 1995.

WNCN became the full-time NBC affiliate in the Raleigh–Durham market on September 11, 1995—a month earlier than planned, thanks to an agreement between WRDC and WNCN. Ahead of the NBC move, channel 17 began producing local news on September 4, and new station WRAZ (channel 50) signed on with The WB. After the NBC sale closed in 1996, the station began using the NBC peacock extensively in its own branding. "Bud" Polacek, who was the first general manager for the station as an NBC affiliate, left the station due to illness in April 1998; he died of cancer that August.

In 2000, WNCN relocated its transmitter facilities from the Clayton tower to a nearly 2,000-foot (610 m) perch on an arm of Capitol Broadcasting Company's new digital candelabra tower 8 miles (13 km) closer to Raleigh, near Auburn. WNCN signed on its digital signal on UHF channel 55 at the same time. However, NBC's legacy of futility in the market continued to reverberate despite the improved product and facilities. For instance, in 2015, the general manager of WITN-TV in Washington, North Carolina, noted that that station "steals" viewers in four counties in the Raleigh–Durham designated market area from WNCN because viewership habits to the eastern North Carolina station were established before WNCN was an NBC affiliate.

=== Media General and Nexstar ownership; switch to CBS ===
On January 9, 2006, NBCUniversal announced it was putting WNCN up for sale, along with WVTM-TV in Birmingham, Alabama, and the other two former Outlet stations, WJAR and WCMH. On April 6, 2006, Media General announced that it would acquire the four stations. The sale was finalized on June 26, 2006. In April 2013, as part of a new branding campaign, the station switched its branding from "NBC 17" to just WNCN; the new brand was intended to emphasize the station's "strong desire to more aggressively serve its local communities". The station's marketing director declared both "NBC" and "17" as "irrelevant to our local content mission".

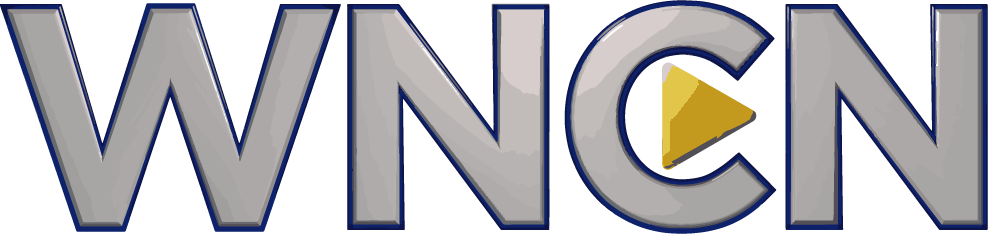
WNCN's last logo as an NBC affiliate, used from 2013 to 2016

WNCN's first logo as a CBS affiliate, used from 2016 to 2018

On January 15, 2016, it was announced that WNCN would switch to CBS on February 29, 2016, after existing affiliate WRAL-TV decided not to renew its affiliation. NBC, in turn, returned to WRAL-TV, which had been the Triangle's NBC affiliate from 1956 to 1962. WNCN became the fourth station in the Triangle to affiliate with CBS. The network had originally aligned with WNAO-TV, Raleigh's first TV station, in 1953 and moved to WTVD in 1958 before switching to WRAL-TV in 1985.

Soon thereafter, on January 27, 2016, it was announced that the Nexstar Broadcasting Group would buy Media General for $4.6 billion. WNCN became part of Nexstar upon the sale's consummation on January 17, 2017.

Upon the switch to CBS, the station changed its on-air branding to "CBS North Carolina" and its newscasts to "North Carolina News". While, in the lead-up to the switch, WNCN emphasized the strong ratings performance of CBS programming and prime time shows, as well as the NCAA Division I men's basketball tournament, ratings for CBS programming in the Triangle dropped significantly with the switch to WNCN on February 29, 2016. On the day of the switch, CBS This Morning, CBS Evening News and The Late Show with Stephen Colbert all lost more than half their audience share; all three fell from first place in the Triangle ratings during their time periods to third place in one stroke.

On March 15, 2018, WNCN rebranded as CBS 17.

== News operation ==
After Outlet bought the station and in the wake of securing the NBC affiliation, hiring for a news department began even before the call letters were changed. In November 1994, an ad in Electronic Media announced that WYED was hiring news anchors, weather anchors, and other staff necessary for newscast production. Nearly nine months later, NCN News debuted on September 4, 1995, a week ahead of WNCN's switch to NBC, with a half-hour early evening newscast at 7 p.m. and a late evening newscast at 11 p.m. nightly. Promising a "New Generation of News", NCN News aimed to differentiate itself from the longstanding news offerings of WRAL and WTVD. The style was loose and informal: the anchors wore clothing from Banana Republic, there was no dedicated sports anchor, and of the four main presenters, only one—Art Edwards—had worked in the market before, though meteorologist Lisa Spencer was hired from The Weather Channel. Ron Bilek, the founding news director at WNCN, claimed the product was designed with "more of a high-tech/Triangle lifestyle look and feel".

However, few people watched. At 11 p.m., when WRAL, WTVD, and WNCN all competed head-to-head, channel 17 drew a fraction of the viewers of the other two stations. At 7 p.m., it was tied for last place with the entertainment offerings of WLFL and WKFT. By June, there was a local morning newscast and a 6 p.m. show, but the ratings did not increase. As a 4 p.m. newscast was added, news director Ron Bilek and assistant Gina Pearce resigned over "philosophical differences" that July. In the wake of their firing, anchors began to sit at the desk instead of roaming the newsroom. There was little movement, and even then-Fox affiliate WLFL at times performed better in the ratings. Within five years, the four main anchors hired at the news department's launch had all left.

In 2003, WNCN news director Caroline Claeys departed after an edition of the station's 5 p.m. newscast featured two viewers, winners of a contest to present the weather on one of the station's news programs, who rapped the forecast; the Triangle Association of Black Journalists wrote a letter to WNCN, calling the stunt degrading. Claeys's permanent replacement was Nannette Wilson; under her leadership, ratings increased for the station's newscasts, though they still remained a distant third. Media General invested in a new set upon taking over, with more resources going to channel 17 because it went from one of NBC's smallest outposts to the second-largest market in which Media General operated.

In 2006, WNCN reinstated the 7 p.m. newscast, moving syndicated programming to the 5 p.m. hour that previously housed news. The station became the first in the market to move the start time of its weekday morning newscast to 4:30 a.m. in 2010.

On January 27, 2014, WNCN launched a half-hour midday newscast at 11 a.m., featuring talent from WNCN Today. The launch coincided with the discontinuation of the 4:30 a.m. half-hour of its morning newscast and the shifting of the advertorial My Carolina Today to 11:30 a.m. The show changed its name to My Carolina Talk with the switch to CBS and later became My Carolina; in 2022, it became an hour-long program at 9 a.m.

When WNCN became a CBS affiliate, channel 17's newscasts were rebranded North Carolina News. Several changes in time slots accompanied the network switch: its 11 a.m. newscast moved to noon, and channel 17 resumed airing an hour of news at 5 p.m., dropping its 7 p.m. newscast. Originally, The Young and the Restless aired at 4 p.m. as a lead-in to WNCN's early-evening news block. The local late-afternoon scheduling of The Young and the Restless dated to a 1993 WRAL-TV schedule change. Ratings improved in some time slots, but talent turnover and changes were also cited as a factor keeping the Raleigh–Durham news competition a "two-horse race".

On January 17, 2022, WNCN reduced its noon newscast to 30 minutes, with The Young and the Restless moving to its traditional 12:30 p.m. time slot to make way for a new 4 p.m. newscast.

=== Notable current on-air staff ===
- Wes Hohenstein – meteorologist

=== Notable former on-air staff ===
- Penn Holderness – anchor
- Hari Sreenivasan – technology reporter (1995–1996)

== Technical information ==
=== Subchannels ===
WNCN's transmitter is located in Auburn, North Carolina. The station's signal is multiplexed:

Subchannels of WNCN
Subchannel	Res.	Short name	Programming
17.1	1080i	WNCN-HD	CBS
17.2	480i	Rewind	Rewind TV
17.3	480i	Grit	Grit
17.4	480i	Antenna	Antenna TV
28.2	480i	Charge!	Charge! (WRDC)

Broadcast on behalf of another station

WNCN airs one subchannel of WRDC from its transmitter facility as part of WRDC's 2020 conversion to ATSC 3.0 (Next Gen TV); WRDC, in turn, broadcasts WNCN's CBS subchannel in that format.

=== Analog-to-digital conversion ===
WNCN ended regular programming on its analog signal, over UHF channel 17, at 12:30 p.m. on June 12, 2009, the official date on which full-power television stations in the United States transitioned from analog to digital broadcasts under federal mandate. The station's digital signal relocated from its pre-transition UHF channel 55, which was among the high band UHF channels (52-69) that were removed from broadcasting use as a result of the transition, to its analog-era UHF channel 17.

=== Spectrum reallocation ===
On April 13, 2017, it was announced that WNCN's over-the-air broadcast spectrum was sold for $52 million during the FCC's spectrum reallocation incentive auction. Net proceeds from the sale went to former shareholders of Media General, which was acquired by Nexstar in January 2017. On September 11, 2019, WNCN moved to channel 8 in the high VHF band.
