= WRAL =

WRAL may refer to:

- WRAL-TV, a television station (channel 17, virtual 5) licensed to Raleigh, North Carolina
- WRAL (FM), a radio station (101.5 FM) licensed to Raleigh, North Carolina
- WPJL, a radio station (1240 AM) licensed to Raleigh, North Carolina, and once called WRAL
