= Fox 50 =

Fox 50 may refer to:

== Current ==
- WRAZ (TV) in Raleigh, North Carolina

== Former ==
- WKBD in Detroit, Michigan (1986–1994)

== Other uses ==
- The Fox 50, an industrial index of large companies put together by the Fox Business Network
