= WCLY (North Carolina) =

- Raleigh, North Carolina; United States
- Broadcast area: Raleigh–Durham; Research Triangle
- Frequency: 1550 kHz
- Branding: The Buzz

Programming
- Format: Defunct
- Affiliations: ESPN Radio; Carolina Panthers; Duke Blue Devils

Ownership
- Owner: Capitol Broadcasting Company; (WCLY-AM, LLC)
- Sister stations: WRAL-TV; WRAL; WCMC-FM; WDNC; WRAZ-TV; WNGT-CD

History
- First air date: August 1962 (as WNOH)
- Last air date: January 31, 2025
- Former call signs: WNOH (1962–1966); WYNA (1966–1982); WRZR (1982–1983); WSES (1983–1987)

Technical information
- Licensing authority: FCC
- Facility ID: 51262
- Class: D
- Power: 1,000 watts day; 8 watts night
- Transmitter coordinates: 35°45′37.55″N 78°39′25.01″W

Links
- Public license information: Public file; LMS
- Webcast: Listen live
- Website: www.wralsportsfan.com/rs/page/11071232/

WCLY (1550 AM; "The Buzz") was a radio station licensed to Raleigh, North Carolina owned by Capitol Broadcasting Company along with sister radio stations WRAL-FM, WCMC-FM and WDNC, and television stations WRAL-TV and WRAZ-TV. Its studios were located in Raleigh, and the transmitter tower site was just south of downtown Raleigh. Established in 1962 as WNOH, WCLY last broadcast a sports radio format, simulcasting sister stations WDNC and WCMC-FM HD2; it was closed in 2025.

== History ==
WCLY began broadcasting in August 1962 as WNOH, a country station founded by N.O. Harris, owner of Harris Wholesale, a local beer distributor. WNOH's original antenna was close to where present-day Interstate 40 crosses Lake Wheeler Road, and its studios were located in the Jack Wardlaw Building on Hillsborough Street. WNOH switched to Top 40 as WYNA in 1966, only to return to country under former WKIX owner Hugh Holder. As country music began taking root on the FM dial, WYNA became Top 40 again as WRZR "The Rock of Raleigh" in 1982.

The Top 40 format did not last long, and the station became WSES in 1983 and switched to black gospel. Construction of I-40 through southern Raleigh forced the station to move their antenna to Maywood Avenue, where it shared a tower with WLLE (now WQDR). By 1987, the final calls, WCLY, were adopted. In the late 1990s, both WCLY and the former WLLE (which was WDTF at the time) were bought by Curtis Media Group.

It was announced, on August 10, 2009, that Curtis Media would sell WCLY and WDNC to Capitol Broadcasting Company in exchange for the North Carolina News Network. WCLY later switched to Spanish language sports radio from ESPN Deportes Radio in October.

On April 16, 2011, a tornado felled the Maywood Avenue tower shared by WCLY and what was then known as WFNL (now WQDR). While WFNL would leave this site to diplex from sister station WPTF's transmitter site, WCLY eventually returned to the air from a new tower at this same site. During its construction, WCLY returned to the air via a temporary long wire antenna.

On February 29, 2016, WCLY relaunched as an English-language sports station, "1550 the Ticket". The station featured a mix of sports programming from ESPN Radio, CBS Sports Radio, and Fox Sports Radio, which also aired on WCMC-FM 99.9-HD3. ESPN Deportes continued to air on 99.9-HD4.

On February 1, 2017, WCLY signed on an FM translator at 95.7 FM and changed its moniker to "95.7 the Ticket". The translator on 95.7 FM broadcast with an effective radiated power of 250 watts with a directional signal (towards the north) from the WDCG tower. In addition, WCLY also broadcast Appalachian State football, NASCAR, and North Carolina FC soccer.

On May 1, 2018, WCLY changed its format to adult album alternative, branded as "That Station". The "Ticket" sports format moved to WDNC. Musical styles ranged from roots, Americana, bluegrass, rhythm & blues, rock and country. Artists included Jason Isbell, Nathaniel Rateliff, Avett Brothers, The Decemberists and Ryan Adams. Capitol Broadcasting ran a contest in which listeners were invited to submit ideas for a permanent name, but the vast majority of the nominations were to keep the name "That Station".

On July 31, 2022, WCLY flipped back to sports, branded as "The Buzz", simulcasting sister stations WDNC and WCMC-FM HD2. The adult album alternative format continued on 101.5 WRAL-HD2 and translator 95.7 W239CK.

On February 5, 2023, the station went off the air.

On January 30, 2025, WCLY filed a special temporary authority request to go off the air as of January 31, "for technical and financial reasons... for more than 30 days", which was granted by the Federal Communications Commission. It never returned to the air; Capitol Broadcasting surrendered the WCLY license in January 2026, and it was cancelled on February 5, 2026.
