= WCLY =

WCLY may refer to:

- WCLY (AM), a radio station (1490 AM) in Bridport, Vermont, United States
- WCLY (North Carolina), a defunct radio station (1550 AM) in Raleigh, North Carolina, United States, which held the WCLY call sign from 1987 until 2026
- WPGC-FM, a radio station (95.5 FM) in Morningside, Maryland, United States, that held the WCLY call sign from 1985 until 1987
