= WLFL =

Television station in Raleigh, North Carolina

- Raleigh–Durham–; Fayetteville, North Carolina; United States
- City: Raleigh, North Carolina
- Channels: Digital: 18 (UHF); Virtual: 22
- Branding: CW 22

Programming
- Affiliations: 22.1: The CW; for others, see § Subchannels

Ownership
- Owner: Sinclair Broadcast Group; (WLFL Licensee, LLC)
- Sister stations: WRDC

History
- First air date: December 18, 1981
- Former call signs: WLFL-TV (1981–1993)
- Former channel numbers: Analog: 22 (UHF, 1981–2009); Digital: 57 (UHF, until 2009), 27 (UHF, 2009–2019)
- Former affiliations: Independent (1981–1986); Fox (1986–1998); The WB (1998–2006)
- Call sign meaning: "Light for Living"; station was built as a Christian TV station

Technical information
- Licensing authority: FCC
- Facility ID: 73205
- ERP: 775 kW
- HAAT: 605.3 m (1,986 ft)
- Transmitter coordinates: 35°40′29″N 78°31′39″W

Links
- Public license information: Public file; LMS
- Website: raleighcw.com

WLFL (channel 22) is a television station licensed to Raleigh, North Carolina, United States, serving the Research Triangle area as an affiliate of The CW. It is owned by Sinclair Broadcast Group alongside WRDC (channel 28), an independent station with MyNetworkTV. The two stations share studios in the Highwoods Office Park, just outside downtown Raleigh; WLFL's transmitter is located in Auburn, North Carolina.

WLFL began broadcasting in December 1981 after years of work by Christian groups. It was the Triangle's first full-market independent station, airing secular and some religious programs. It was purchased by TVX Broadcast Group in 1985; TVX made WLFL the area's first Fox affiliate when the network launched in 1986 and upgraded its programming. TVX was sold to Paramount Pictures between 1989 and 1991; Paramount invested in a 10 p.m. local newscast for channel 22, which debuted in September 1992.

Sinclair acquired WLFL from Paramount in 1994; the next year, after a dispute with Sinclair and Fox over programming, Fox agreed to move its programming to WRAZ (channel 50) beginning in 1998. At that time, WLFL became an affiliate of The WB. The local newscast continued, but ratings fell behind WRAZ's competing effort; it was converted to the News Central hybrid format and discontinued in March 2006, replaced shortly thereafter with a program produced by ABC affiliate WTVD. That year, WLFL also joined The CW when The WB and UPN merged. The WTVD newscast was discontinued in 2022.

== History ==
Channel 22 had been allocated by the Federal Communications Commission (FCC) to Raleigh as an educational reserved channel in 1952. However, it was unreserved by the mid-1960s, and in 1965, two groups that had sought the channel alone merged. The groups were Crescent Broadcasting Company, led by former governor Terry Sanford, and the Springfield Television Broadcasting Company of Springfield, Massachusetts. The merged company found itself waiting on the FCC for approval of its application. The main issue was that the FCC was busy revamping the table of ultra high frequency (UHF) television allocations nationally. The merged Springfield-Crescent group had hoped for channel 22 because Springfield Television already owned two channel 22 stations (WWLP-TV in Springfield and WKEF in Dayton, Ohio), but they instead received channel 28 along with the call letters WJHF when the construction permit was granted. That June, the FCC let them move back to channel 22. Springfield became the full owner of the construction permit at year's end, and the station even began purchasing movie packages, but ownership soon reverted to the Sanford group, which discontinued its plans for WJHF.

Channel 22 was then used by WRDU (channel 28), a new UHF station in Durham, for its Raleigh translator; established on channel 70 in 1969, it moved to channel 22 in 1972.

=== "Light for Living" ===
Interest in building a full-service station on channel 22 began in 1976 when Carolina Christian Communications, a group formed by Durham TV service shop owner L. L. "Buddy" Leathers, began raising funds with the goal of building a station with family-oriented and religious programs. Shortly before Christmas 1976, the group filed for a construction permit to build channel 22; a possible contender, Durham Life Broadcasting, had instead opted against filing for channel 22 and bought channel 28. Leathers expressed hope that any facilities vacated by an expanding WRDU could be reused by his station.

A construction permit was awarded in 1977, and Leathers selected the call sign WLFL—"Light for Living". WTVD in Durham also gifted its Broad Street studio, which it had used since 1954 and was about to vacate, to Carolina Christian Communications; prior to being a television studio, it had served as a jail and a sanitorium. However, Carolina Christian soon found that the former WRDU transmission facility was inadequate to cover the Raleigh–Durham area, and the group sought to raise $1 million in temporary financing to get the station going. It was still waiting for FCC approval to move its transmitter in May 1979.

Because lenders were reluctant to loan money to a non-profit, Leathers had the construction permit transferred for $633,000 from Carolina Christian Communications to Family Television Inc., in which Leathers also owned a stake. Despite the change to a more commercial operation, the gift of WTVD's studio carried no restrictions forbidding its use by a for-profit company. In August 1981, a start date of the following month was announced; however, delays in constructing the station's tower at Apex held up completion.

WLFL began broadcasting on the afternoon of December 18, 1981, with the film Love Is a Many-Splendored Thing as its inaugural program. The station's Durham quarters would prove to be temporary; because channel 22 was designated to Raleigh, it had to move its main studio there within 18 months of starting up. Even before launch, the possibility was floated of the station leaving Durham for Raleigh.

On November 5, 1984, Family Television announced it would sell WLFL to S&F Communications Corp., a group led by Stephen D. Seymour and Stuart D. Frankel, with a call sign change to WMVZ planned for when the new owners took over. Seymour had scouted the station for the A.S. Abell Company, publisher of The Baltimore Sun; however, Abell opted not to make the transaction and offered its option to buy to Seymour.

=== TVX and Paramount ownership ===
The Seymour deal fell apart, and in June 1985, the Norfolk, Virginia–based TVX Broadcast Group purchased WLFL for $14.5 million, after the deal with S&F fell through. TVX, in announcing the purchase, informed investors that it would likely have to sell WNRW in Winston-Salem to buy WLFL; the two stations' signals overlapped, a combination then generally not allowed by the FCC. The FCC approved the WLFL transaction in February 1986 and gave TVX 12 months to divest itself of WNRW. (Note: That November, TVX filed with the FCC to sell the Winston-Salem station to a new broadcasting group, Act III Broadcasting, owned by television producer Norman Lear.) During 1986, WLFL also became the market's first Fox affiliate when the network launched on October 9, and it leased space in a distribution center on Front Street in Raleigh.

TVX upgraded WLFL's programming. By the end of the decade, the station's programming was attracting five percent of the market, though it was well ahead of WPTF-TV, an anemic NBC affiliate, in that station's news time slots. By November 1990, it had passed WPTF in total-day ratings.

Later in 1986, TVX acquired five major-market independent stations from Taft Broadcasting in a highly leveraged transaction. TVX's bankers, Salomon Brothers, provided the financing for the acquisition and in return held more than 60 percent of the company. The company was to pay Salomon Brothers $200 million on January 1, 1988, and missed the first payment deadline, having been unable to lure investors to its junk bonds even before Black Monday. While TVX recapitalized by the end of 1988, Salomon Brothers reached an agreement in principle in January 1989 for Paramount Pictures to acquire options to purchase the investment firm's majority stake. This deal was replaced in September with an outright purchase of 79 percent of TVX for $110 million.

In 1991, Paramount acquired the remainder of TVX, forming the Paramount Stations Group. Paramount made one major move in its three years of owning WLFL: it allotted $2.6 million to start a 10 p.m. local newscast on the station beginning September 21, 1992. This would bring the Raleigh–Durham market back to three television newsrooms, as WPTF-TV had discontinued newscasts the year before shortly before changing its call letters to WRDC.

=== Sinclair ownership and loss of Fox affiliation ===
Paramount sold WLFL to Sinclair Broadcast Group in 1994. Nearly simultaneously, Sinclair provided capital for Communications Corporation of America to buy WRDC, then the NBC affiliate (but about to lose its NBC affiliation and switch to UPN). Sinclair provided CCA 98 percent of the money to buy channel 28 and combined the two stations' operations under a local marketing agreement. The merged operation was housed at the former WRDC facility in the Highwoods area; the Front Street studio was then used by the incoming NBC affiliate, WNCN, to start its news department. WLFL gained additional competition, particularly in the area of news, when WRAZ (channel 50) began broadcasting as an affiliate of The WB in September 1995. The station was programmed by WRAL-TV and featured a WRAL-produced 10 p.m. newscast.

In late 1995, however, a rift emerged between Sinclair and Fox. In late November, Fox announced that it would move its network affiliation in Norfolk from Sinclair-owned WTVZ to WVBT, a station that—like WRAZ—was a WB affiliate programmed by one of the market's established stations, when its current affiliation agreement with Sinclair expired in September 1998. Three weeks later, Sinclair revealed in a terse announcement, citing nothing more than "different philosophical views about the future", that Fox had decided to replace WLFL with WRAZ in the network beginning in 1998; Sinclair apparently had little confidence in Fox plans to expand to late night and early morning slots as well as in the area of news. The additional network shows threatened to encroach on lucrative fringe periods where the Sinclair stations made money. Even though relations improved between Sinclair and Fox, the network had already signed affiliation agreements with its new Raleigh and Norfolk stations and carried out the switch in 1998, with WLFL switching from Fox to The WB.

The newscast remained the same, changing from the Fox 22 News at 10 to the WB 22 News at 10 with the same talent. This continued until 2003, when the WLFL newscast was converted to Sinclair's new News Central hybrid newscast format. With half the news program—consisting of national and international news and weather—originating from Sinclair's corporate office in Hunt Valley, Maryland, eight of the 24 employees in the WLFL newsroom lost their jobs. Ratings, which had still been competitive with the WRAL-produced news on WRAZ, slipped behind channel 50.

=== CW affiliation ===
In 2006, The WB and UPN were shut down and replaced with The CW, which offered programming from both predecessor networks. However, Sinclair was late to sign an agreement with The CW. The news of the merger resulted in Sinclair announcing, two months later, that most of its UPN and WB affiliates, including WRDC, would join MyNetworkTV, a new service formed by the News Corporation, which was also owner of the Fox network.

It was not until May 2 that an agreement was signed for WLFL and several other Sinclair-owned WB stations to join The CW. Amid the transition from The WB to The CW, Sinclair wound down News Central and discontinued WLFL's WB 22 News on March 31, 2006, laying off 23 employees. It was replaced with a new 10 p.m. newscast produced by WTVD in Durham on June 26.

On May 15, 2012, Sinclair and Fox agreed to a five-year affiliation agreement extension for the group's 19 Fox-affiliated stations until 2017. This included an option—exercisable between July 1, 2012, and March 31, 2013—for Fox parent News Corporation to buy a combination of six Sinclair-owned stations (two CW/MyNetworkTV duopolies and two standalone MyNetworkTV affiliates) in three out of four markets; WLFL and WRDC were included in the Fox purchase option, along with Sinclair stations in Cincinnati (WSTR-TV), Norfolk (WTVZ), and Las Vegas (KVCW and KVMY). Fox announced in January 2013 that it would not exercise its option to buy any of the Sinclair stations in the aforementioned four markets; it chose instead to purchase WJZY and WMYT-TV in Charlotte from Capitol Broadcasting.

On June 27, 2022—16 years after the first newscast from WTVD—the station announced that the program would be replaced effective immediately with Sinclair's The National Desk, airing from 10 p.m. to 11:30 p.m.

== Technical information ==
=== Subchannels ===
WLFL's transmitter is located in Auburn, North Carolina. The station's signal is multiplexed:

Subchannels of WLFL
Subchannel	Res.	Short name	Programming
22.1	720p	WLFL-CW	The CW
22.2	480i	TheNest	The Nest
22.3	480i	ROAR	Roar
28.1	720p	WRDC-MY	WRDC (Independent with MyNetworkTV)

Broadcast on behalf of another station

The main subchannel of WRDC is broadcast by the WLFL multiplex as part of WRDC's carriage of ATSC 3.0 (NextGen TV) in the Raleigh–Durham market, which began in 2020.

=== Analog-to-digital conversion ===
WLFL ended regular programming on its analog signal, over UHF channel 22, on February 17, 2009, four months ahead of the official date on which full-power television stations in the United States transitioned from analog to digital broadcasts under federal mandate. It was one of three stations in the Triangle market, along with WRDC and independent station WRAY-TV, that decided to switch on that date, even though the official transition date had been changed to June 12, 2009. In June, the signal moved from channel 57, part of the high-band UHF channels being removed from broadcasting use, to its final channel 27.

Although it had an assigned digital channel that it would move to post-transition that differed from its original digital channel, WLFL continued to broadcast its digital signal on its pre-transition allocation (UHF channel 57). The station's digital signal relocated to UHF channel 27 at noon on June 12, 2009, as the station's original digital channel allocation was among the high band UHF channels (52–69) that were removed from broadcasting use as a result of the transition. WLFL relocated its signal from RF channel 27 to RF channel 18 in 2019, as a result of the 2016 United States wireless spectrum auction.
