= Silent Enemy =

Silent Enemy may refer to:

- "Silent Enemy" (Star Trek: Enterprise), the 12th episode of the television series Star Trek: Enterprise
- "Chapter 2: The Silent Enemy", an episode of the television series Cliffhangers
- The Silent Enemy (1930 film), a drama about pre-Christopher Columbus Native Americans starring Native Americans
- The Silent Enemy (1958 film), a British Second World War film
- Silent Enemy, a 2011 novel by Tom Young (novelist)
