= WDUR =

- Durham, North Carolina; United States
- Broadcast area: Research Triangle
- Frequency: 1490 kHz
- Branding: "AM 1490"

Programming
- Format: Indian - South Asian - Bollywood Hits

Ownership
- Owner: Ravi Cherukuri; (Arohi Media LLC)

History
- First air date: February 29, 1948; 78 years ago
- Former call signs: WSSB
- Call sign meaning: Durham

Technical information
- Licensing authority: FCC
- Facility ID: 36943
- Class: C
- Power: 1,000 watts
- Transmitter coordinates: 35°58′04″N 78°53′17″W
- Translator: 101.9 W270DT (Durham)
- Repeater: 99.9 WCMC-HD3 and HD4 (Holly Springs)

Links
- Public license information: Public file; LMS
- Webcast: Listen live (via TuneIn)
- Website: radionyra.com

WDUR (1490 AM) is an Indian/South Asian radio station in Durham, North Carolina, owned by Ravi Cherukuri, through licensee Arohi Media LLC. The station plays primarily Bollywood Hits with talk and news in Hindi, Tamil and Telugu languages.

WDUR is powered at 1,000 watts using a non-directional antenna. Programming is also heard on FM translator W270DT at 101.9 MHz.

== History ==
=== Top 40 ===
The station signed on the air on 1490 kHz on February 29, 1948. The original call sign was WSSB. The 1490 AM frequency had been vacated when another Durham station, WDNC, moved down the dial to 620 kHz. In late 1951, WSSB merged operations with another Durham station, Mutual Broadcasting System network affiliate WHHT 1590 AM, which subsequently left the airwaves.

Ed Clinton was the owner in the 1950s when Lex Diamond introduced a Top 40 format.. Steve Robbins ("Rockin' Robin") and Gaylord "Jay" Wood were DJ's. (Ed Clinton adopted "Jay" as his official nickname.) Charles Cook was a disc jockey when the station was the number one Top 40 station in Durham in the late 1960s. He played white and black artists, and he was one of the few white DJs to acknowledge black schools and their accomplishments.

=== R&B and Sports ===
During the 1980s and 1990s, WDUR played R&B music, serving the African-American community. The station simulcast WFXC and WFXK until 1994, when it began playing R&B oldies. An urban gospel format began in October 1997 on WDUR and WZZU. WZZU later became WNNL The Light 103.9.

By the mid-1990s, the station was owned by Clear Channel Communications. By the year 2000, it was simulcasting the oldies format on WTRG. For part of the 2000s the station aired the same programming as WTSB, a sports radio station. It was during that time when Clear Channel sold WDUR to Triangle Sports Broadcasters.

=== Unsuccessful sale ===
On August 27, 2007, an application was filed with the FCC to transfer the license to Prieto Broadcasting, which agreed to pay $900,000 contingent on FCC approval, which was granted on October 15, 2007. Prieto Broadcasting is located in Doraville, Georgia, and specializes in Spanish language radio targeting the Hispanic community. WDUR later became Radio Luz 1490 AM, and aired the Regional Mexican programming of WETC.

The FCC process cited in the authorization requires that the parties notify the FCC within 90 days after approval that the transfer of the license and station to the new owner has been consummated. However, that notice was not received by the FCC and the license remained with Triangle Sports Broadcasters.

=== South Asian programming ===
Triangle Sports Broadcasters sold WDUR, and filed an application (314) on April 7, 2014 with FCC for license transfer to Arohi Media LLC., a Texas-based company owned by Ravi Cherukuri. FCC released a public notice on April 9, 2014 as part of this process.

On July 8, 2014, WDUR returned to the airwaves after a two-year hiatus under Arohi Media's ownership with Indian radio programming for South Asian community – a first for the market. By January 2017, however, WDUR was simulcasting WRSV 92.1 FM, a station in Elm City, North Carolina, airing an urban contemporary and hip hop music format.

=== FM translator ===
WDUR began broadcasting on FM translator W252DK 98.3 MHz on August 18, 2016. However, the translator was alleged to cause interference to WLUS, a country station licensed to Clarksville, Virginia. Its transmitter is located near Bullock near the North Carolina/Virginia border, whose signal reaches the outer fringes of the Raleigh-Durham area. WLUS's parent company Lakes Media LLC encouraged its listeners in Durham, Wake, and Granville counties to submit a "listener declaration form" to the station in an attempt to convince the FCC to force WDUR's translator off the air. Arohi Media denied its translator was causing interference.

After nearly a year of debate between Arohi Media, and Lakes Media LLC, the Federal Communications Commission sent Arohi a letter requiring that translator W252DK cease operation immediately. The translator's license was suspended and is no longer found in the FCC database.

The FCC accepted a Petition for Reconsideration filed by Arohi Media on June 1, 2017. On August 22, 2017 WDUR's translator on 98.3 FM went off the air, only to return in the summer of 2018 at low power. In November 2018, the station moved to 101.9 FM as W270DT.

As of late December 2017, WDUR has reverted to its South Asian format, breaking off the simulcast with WRSV. In addition to being heard at 1490 AM and the 101.9 FM translator, WDUR is also heard on an HD Radio subchannel on WCMC-FM 99.9 FM: WCMC-FM-HD4.
