= WRAL (FM) =

Adult contemporary radio station in Raleigh, North Carolina, United States

- Raleigh, North Carolina; United States
- Broadcast area: Research Triangle
- Frequency: 101.5 MHz (HD Radio)
- Branding: Mix 101.5

Programming
- Language: English
- Format: Adult contemporary
- Subchannels: HD2: Adult album alternative; HD3: All-news radio
- Affiliations: Carolina Panthers; NC State Wolfpack; WRAL-TV

Ownership
- Owner: Capitol Broadcasting Company; (WRAL-FM, Inc.)
- Sister stations: WCMC-FM; WDNC; WNGT-CD; WRAL-TV; WRAZ

History
- First air date: September 6, 1946
- Former call signs: WRAL-FM (1946–1974)
- Former frequencies: 95.3 MHz (1946–1947)
- Call sign meaning: Raleigh

Technical information
- Licensing authority: FCC
- Facility ID: 73920
- Class: C
- ERP: 98,000 watts (analog); 4,000 watts (digital)
- HAAT: 606 meters (1,988 ft)
- Transmitter coordinates: 35°40′35.1″N 78°32′7.2″W
- Translators: HD2: 95.7 W239CK (Raleigh); HD3: 96.5 W243DK (Durham); HD3: 99.3 W257CS (Morrisville)

Links
- Public license information: Public file; LMS
- Webcast: Listen live; HD2: Listen live; HD3: Listen live
- Website: wralfm.com; HD2: thatstation.net

WRAL (101.5 FM, "Mix 101.5") is a commercial radio station licensed to Raleigh, North Carolina, and serving the Research Triangle. It is owned by the Capitol Broadcasting Company and broadcasts an adult contemporary radio format, switching to Christmas music for part of November and December. Capitol Broadcasting also owns NBC network affiliate WRAL-TV, Fox affiliate WRAZ, and the Durham Bulls minor-league baseball team, along with several other radio stations. WRAL carries the audio of the Six O'Clock News broadcast from sister station WRAL-TV. During tornado warnings, WRAL-FM also simulcasts WRAL-TV's audio of their tornado coverage.

WRAL has an effective radiated power (ERP) of 98,000 watts, close to the current maximum for U.S. radio stations. Its tower is southeast of Raleigh in Auburn at (35°40′35.1″N 78°32′7.2″W). WRAL broadcasts using HD Radio technology. An adult album alternative format branded as "That Station" is on its HD2 digital subchannel. The HD3 subchannel carries an all-news radio format known as "WRAL News+".

== History ==
=== Easy listening and Jesse Helms ===
A construction permit authorizing the station was initially given the call sign WCOY. It changed to WRAL-FM before it signed on for the first time on September 6, 1946, on 95.3 with an ERP of 1,000 watts. It was the second FM station to operate in North Carolina after Christian radio station WMIT, and the first to operate on the new 88–108 MHz band (FM stations had previously used the 42–50 MHz band.). WRAL-FM was a sister station to WRAL 1240 AM (now WPJL). WRAL-AM-FM were owned by A.J. Fletcher's Capitol Broadcasting, which added a TV station in 1956, WRAL-TV channel 5. The studios were located at 130 Salisbury Street, with the transmitter on Davie Street Extension.

Beginning in the 1960s, WRAL-FM offered its own programming, ending the simulcast with its AM sister station. It played easy listening music and provided extensive agricultural reports. Together with WCEC in Rocky Mount and WGBR in Goldsboro, WRAL-FM helped establish a statewide radio network named the Tobacco Radio Network, which connected communities throughout North Carolina. It became the precursor to today's North Carolina News Network, originally based at the WRAL studios (and sold to Curtis Media Group in 2009). WRAL-FM moved to 101.5 MHz in 1947. It concurrently increased its ERP to 54,000 watts.

Jesse Helms became the news director of the radio stations in 1948, adding TV duties when channel 5 signed on. From 1960 until his election to the U.S. Senate in 1972, the station offered the audio portion of commentaries by Helms which aired as the "Viewpoint" segment on WRAL-TV. The station increased its ERP to 250,000 watts in 1963, which was grandfathered one year later after the FCC imposed new tower height and power restrictions. That made WRAL-FM an FM "superpower station". Only a handful of stations in the U.S. had power of a quarter-million watts or more.

=== Adult contemporary ===
WRAL-FM switched its format to adult contemporary in the early 1970s, branding itself as "WRAL-Stereo 101" and later "WRAL-FM 101.5". The format continues to this day, though at one point the station leaned toward hot AC. The "-FM" suffix was dropped from the call sign on October 1, 1974. Famous Bob Inskeep (FBI) started as morning host in 1975. The show included news and information as well as the puppet Zoot, mailman Mr. Snailspace and tax consultant H.R. Blockhead.

A new, taller tower was built in 1977 near Auburn, with an ERP of 100,000 Watts. On December 10, 1989, an early morning winter ice storm caused the tower it shared with WRAL-TV near Auburn, North Carolina, to collapse, along with a separate tower for WPTF-TV (now WRDC). The station moved its transmission signal to WPTF's former tower near Apex until a new tower was built at the same site the following year. With the new tower, the station had an effective radiated power of 96,000 watts to conform to FCC standards, since its antenna was situated farther up the tower than before. Even with the power reduction, the station still has one of the largest coverage areas of any station in North Carolina. It provides at least secondary coverage as far west as Asheboro, as far east as Greenville, as far south as Elizabethtown and as far north as the Virginia-North Carolina border.

==== HD Radio ====
On December 20, 2002, the station became the first licensed commercial radio station on the East Coast to broadcast using HD Radio technology. WRAL-HD1 simulcast the analog signal, while WRAL-HD2 offered a more modern-leaning playlist. On Monday, June 27, 2005, WRAL became the first commercial station in North Carolina and only the second commercial station in the nation (WUSN in Chicago was the first) to use the "multicasting" capabilities of HD Radio technology to broadcast multiple digital channels.

On April 2, 2013, WRAL-HD2 changed formats to contemporary Christian music, an expansion of the "Cornerstone" program normally heard on Sunday mornings on the main channel from 7 to noon. "Cornerstone" has been hosted by Jami Caskey since it first aired in 1984, and is the station's longest-running program. When the main channel switches to all-Christmas music after Thanksgiving, HD2 airs the adult contemporary format heard during the rest of the year. However, as of 2023, Christmas music on WRAL-FM was restricted to a few select weekends and their normal format ran with some Christmas songs mixed in during the weekdays. WRAL-FM's website offered a 24/7 stream of their Christmas music, and the station would eventually go all-Christmas at 5 pm on December 8.

In March 2022, the HD2 channel flipped from contemporary Christian to an adult album alternative format and began a simulcast of sister station WCLY, also known as "95.7 That Station".

On August 2, 2022, WRAL-HD3, W243DK, and W257CS flipped from sports radio "The Buzz" (which moved to WDNC and WCLY while remaining on WCMC-FM HD2) to all-news radio as "WRAL News+", airing newscasts from WRAL-TV. The stations remain as the radio home of Durham Bulls baseball.

=== Sports ===
On April 23, 2007, WRAL-FM became the flagship station for the NC State Wolfpack, beginning with the 2007–2008 school year. The broadcast rights to football and basketball games belong to Wolfpack Sports Properties, which is jointly owned by Capitol Broadcasting and Learfield Sports. The weekly coaches' shows with Dave Doeren and Justin Gainey air separately on sister station WCMC-FM.

WRAL-FM became part of the Carolina Panthers radio network prior to the 2024 season. The station airs all preseason, regular season, and postseason games alongside sister station Buzz Sports Radio, and Panther Talk with Dave Canales on 99.9 the Fan. Daily updates are featured on both Buzz Sports Radio and 99.9 the Fan.

==== Delilah and Rick Dees ====
WRAL-FM was the second station in Raleigh to air the nationally syndicated Delilah nighttime radio show, which it carried from November 2007 until October 2009. WRSN ("Sunny 93.9") had carried the program before that station flipped to Rhythmic AC as "93.9 Kiss FM".

On August 22, 2009, WRAL-FM started to air the Rick Dees Weekly Top 30 Countdown show on Saturdays from 7–10 am. It also replaced the Delilah program with the John Tesh Radio Show beginning October 5, 2009. Both Dees and Tesh are veterans to Triangle radio, having worked at WKIX in the early 1970s, along with former WRAL-TV morning and noon anchor Bill Leslie.

==== Morning show changes ====
On March 5, 2013, morning drive time personality Bill Jordan announced his retirement after 23 years with the station.

On July 28, 2014, "The Gene and Julie Show" began airing in morning drive time, with husband and wife Gene and Julie Gates. In 2015, the couple won the Marconi Award for Large Market Personality of the Year. Even with the bump in ratings, Gene & Julie eventually parted ways with WRAL-FM on August 15, 2016. The following week, WRAL-FM debuted a new morning show called "Two Men & A Mom". The hosts were Kyle Smelser and Bryan Lord, who came from WNOW-FM in Indianapolis, along with Raleigh native Sarah King, who worked at WKNC while a student at N.C. State. However, the show has since been renamed "Mix Mornings with Kyle, Bryan, and Sarah".

On July 15, 2026, two-thirds of the Mix Mornings crew announced their departures from the station. Bryan Lord cited a move closer to family in Indiana as his reason for leaving, while Sarah King stated a need to be closer to her family and pursuing other ventures. The remaining host, Kyle Smelser will continue on with new co-host Meghan Lamontagne moving from middays.

== Translators ==
WRAL simulcasts its HD subchannel programing on the following translators:

Broadcast translator for WRAL-HD2
Call sign	Frequency	City of license	FID	ERP (W)	Class	Transmitter coordinates	FCC info	Notes
W239CK	95.7 FM	Raleigh, North Carolina	157691	250	D	35°42′50.6″N 78°49′3″W	LMS	

Broadcast translators for WRAL-HD3
Call sign	Frequency	City of license	FID	ERP (W)	Class	Transmitter coordinates	FCC info	Notes
W243DK	96.5 FM	Durham, North Carolina	87684	250	D	36°3′33.5″N 78°57′10″W	LMS	
W257CS	99.3 FM	Morrisville, North Carolina	156990	250	D	35°47′13.7″N 78°43′36.9″W	LMS	Primarily broadcasts audio of WRAL-TV newscasts.

Until August 2, 2022, W243DK and W257CS simulcast WCMC-FM HD2 as sports "The Buzz".
