= WNGT-CD =

Television station in Smithfield–Selma, North Carolina

ATSC 3.0 station
- Smithfield–Selma–; Raleigh–Durham–; Fayetteville, North Carolina; United States
- City: Smithfield–Selma, North Carolina
- Channels: Digital: 23 (UHF); Virtual: 34
- Branding: WRAL Plus

Programming
- Affiliations: 34.1: Independent / Local news

Ownership
- Owner: Capitol Broadcasting Company, Inc.
- Sister stations: WRAL-TV; WRAZ; WRAL; WCMC-FM; WDNC

History
- Former call signs: W35AR (1988–1996); WARZ-LP (1996–2011); WARZ-LD (2011–2015); WARZ-CD (2015–2021)
- Former channel numbers: Analog: 35 (UHF, 1988–1996), 34 (UHF, 1996–2011); Digital: 34 (UHF, 2011–2019)
- Former affiliations: Independent (1988–2009); The Sportsman Channel (2009); Retro TV (2009–2021); 3ABN (2021–2022); Decades/Catchy Comedy (2022–2023)
- Call sign meaning: NextGen TV (trade name for ATSC 3.0)

Technical information
- Licensing authority: FCC
- Facility ID: 71089
- Class: CD
- ERP: 15 kW
- HAAT: 334.2 m (1,096 ft)
- Transmitter coordinates: 35°40′35.1″N 78°32′7.2″W

Links
- Public license information: Public file; LMS

WNGT-CD (channel 34), branded as WRAL Plus, is a low-power, Class A television station licensed to both Smithfield and Selma, North Carolina, United States, serving the Research Triangle region. Locally owned by Capitol Broadcasting Company, it is programmed as a news-formatted independent station. WNGT-CD is sister to NBC affiliate and company flagship WRAL-TV (channel 5) and Fox affiliate WRAZ (channel 50), both licensed to Raleigh. The stations share studios at Capitol Broadcasting headquarters on Western Boulevard in Raleigh; WNGT-CD's transmitter is located atop WRAL-TV's former analog tower, on TV Tower Road in Auburn, North Carolina. Prior to 2021, the station transmitted from South Pollock Street (US 301) in Selma, near the Selma Memorial Cemetery.

On September 11, 2020, Waters & Brock Communications reached a deal to sell then-WARZ-CD to Capitol Broadcasting for use as an ATSC 3.0 NextGen TV multiplex for its Raleigh television stations.

While WNGT-CD's signal is used to multiplex ATSC 3.0 transmissions, its original programming is now aired via a subchannel of WRAL-TV that displays as virtual channel 34.1.

On October 21, 2021, the station's call letters were changed to WNGT-CD.

The station is the local broadcast home of the Durham Bulls, the Triple-A affiliate of the Tampa Bay Rays. Both the Bulls and WNGT-CD are owned by Capitol Broadcasting Company.

== Technical information ==
=== Subchannel ===
Subchannel provided by WNGT-CD (ATSC 1.0) on the WRAL-TV multiplex
Subchannel	Res.	Short name	Programming
34.1	720p	WNGT CD	WRAL Plus

=== ATSC 3.0 lighthouse ===
WNGT-CD's ATSC 3.0 multiplex carries its main programming and those of its sister Capitol stations and PBS member station WUNC-TV.

Subchannels of WNGT-CD (ATSC 3.0)
Subchannel	Res.	Short name	Programming
4.1	1080p	PBS NC1	PBS (WUNC-TV)
5.1	1080p	WRAL*	NBC (WRAL-TV)
34.1	720p	WNGT*	WRAL Plus
50.1	720p	WRAZ*	Fox (WRAZ)

On November 20, 2020, then-WARZ-CD switched over to ATSC 3.0, with simulcasts from WRAL-TV and WRAZ. On December 10, WRAL-TV began the ATSC 1.0 simulcast of WARZ-CD. On March 22, PBS North Carolina began simulcast of WUNC-TV.
