= WETC =

Catholic radio station in Wendell and Zebulon, North Carolina

- Wendell–Zebulon, North Carolina; United States
- Broadcast area: Raleigh–Durham; Research Triangle
- Frequency: 540 kHz
- Branding: Catholic 540-AM Divine Mercy Radio

Programming
- Format: Catholic Talk and Teaching
- Affiliations: EWTN Radio; Ave Maria Radio

Ownership
- Owner: Divine Mercy Radio, Inc.
- Sister stations: WFNE-LP, WPJL

History
- First air date: June 21, 1960; 65 years ago (first license granted)
- Call sign meaning: We're Everything Catholic (slogan based on existing call sign)

Technical information
- Licensing authority: FCC
- Facility ID: 18269
- Class: B
- Power: 10,000 watts day; 4,400 watts night
- Transmitter coordinates: 35°52′9.5″N 78°25′55″W

Links
- Public license information: Public file; LMS
- Webcast: Listen Live
- Website: www.catholic540am.org

WETC (540 kHz) is a non-commercial, listener-supported radio station licensed to the cities of Wendell and Zebulon, North Carolina. It is owned by Divine Mercy Radio, Inc., a 501(c)(3) corporation. It is an all-volunteer, independently-owned station that airs a Catholic radio format, with shows from EWTN Radio and Ave Maria Radio. Programming is simulcast on WPJL 1240 AM in Knightdale.

By day, WETC is powered at 10,000 watts. To protect other stations on 540 AM from interference, at night it reduces power to 4,400 watts. It uses a directional antenna at all times, with a three-to-four tower array. The transmitter is on Oak Legacy Lane in Rolesville. The station's signal benefits from being low on the AM band, allowing it to target the Research Triangle region of North Carolina, including the Raleigh-Durham radio market and also reaching communities in Eastern North Carolina.

== History ==
On June 16, 1959, WETC signed on the air. It was a 250 watt daytimer. Because AM 540 is a clear-channel frequency reserved for Canada and Mexico, WETC had to sign-off every evening at sunset to avoid interfering with skywave signals of other radio stations. It was later allowed to broadcast at night, but only with reduced power.

WETC's call letters originally were said to stand for "We Entertain Tobacco Country". (With its current Catholic radio format, the slogan was changed to "We're Every Thing Catholic.") WETC was a long-time country music station. In 1992, it became the first radio station to target the Research Triangle's Spanish-speaking community with part-time programming. It went completely Spanish by the late 1990s. WETC was owned by East Wake Broadcasting and later Carolina Regional Broadcasting before Prieto Communications bought it in 2004.

Prieto Communications sold WETC to Marta Sanchez's Sanchez Broadcasting Corporation for consideration of the forgiveness of $1.45 million in debt; the transaction was consummated on January 4, 2013.

WETC's programming was once simulcast on AM 1490 WDUR in Durham, North Carolina. That station now airs a South Asian format.

On March 25, 2016, WETC was granted a construction permit from the Federal Communications Commission (FCC) to increase its daytime power to 10,000 watts.

Effective August 31, 2018, Sanchez Broadcasting sold WETC to Divine Mercy Radio, Inc. for $850,000. Divine Mercy is a non-profit organization devoted to Catholic Radio programming. On October 1, 2018, Divine Mercy Radio filed a "Remain Silent Authority" application with the FCC, citing major technical issues. At the time, the station was expected to remain off the air for 120 days while technicians made repairs. WETC resumed regular operations on February 4, 2019.
