= Bill Leslie (journalist) =

American newcaster and recording artist

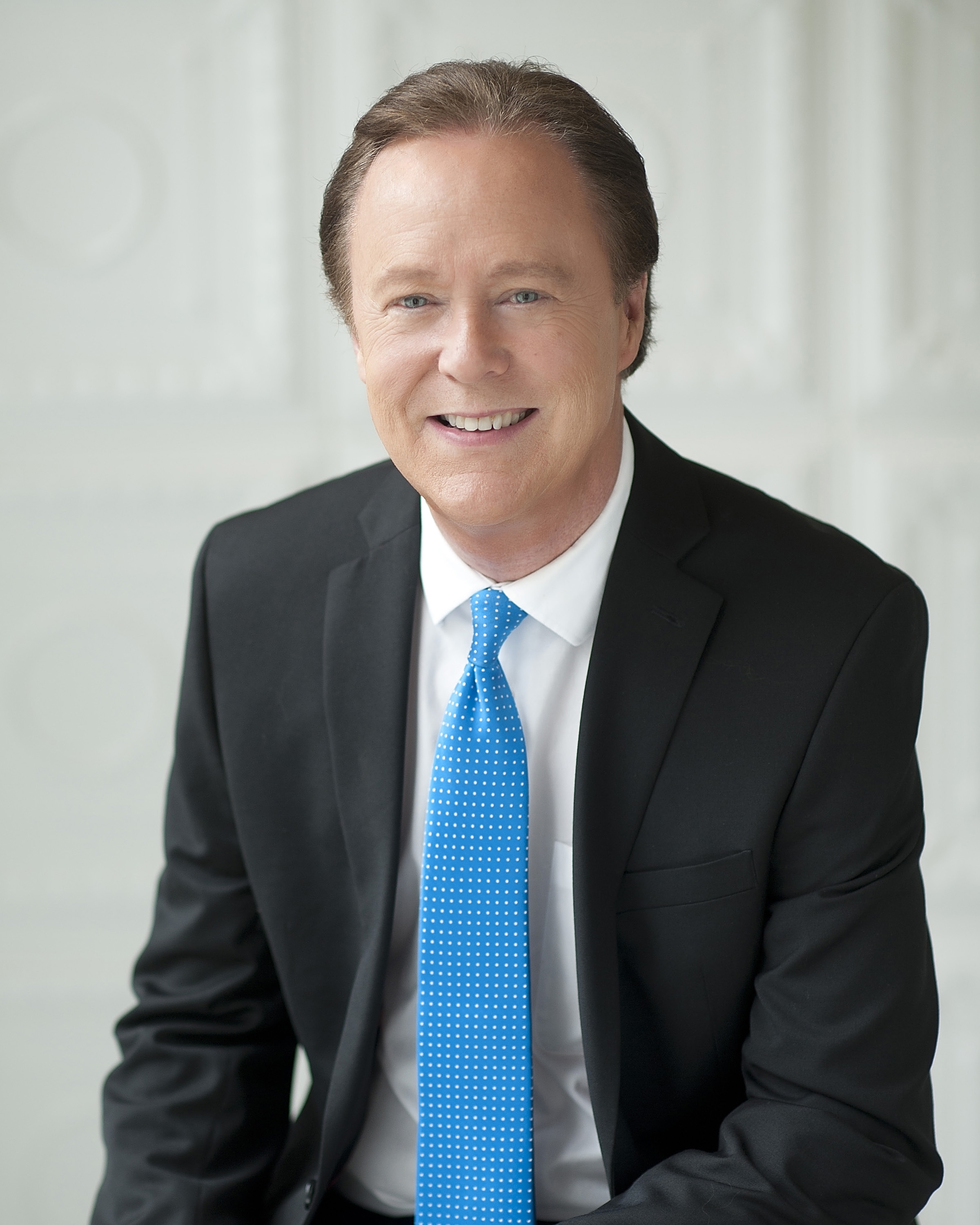

Background information
- Born: September 26, 1950 (age 75); Morganton, North Carolina, U.S.
- Genres: New Age, World, Celtic Fusion
- Occupations: Composer; Recording Artist; News Anchor; News Reporter
- Instruments: Guitar, Celtic Whistle, Piano
- Website: Official website

Bill Leslie is an American journalist who formerly anchored the morning and noon newscasts for WRAL-TV in Raleigh, North Carolina. Bill won more than 70 major news awards, including two Peabody Awards, along with five Emmys. He is also known as a New Age recording artist and composer. Bill has produced twelve music albums, including World Radio Music Album of the Year in 2013 for "Scotland: Grace of the Wild." Bill was awarded the North Carolina Award, the state's highest honor, in 2018 for his accomplishments in music and journalism. In 2022, Bill was inducted into the North Carolina Association of Broadcasters Hall of Fame. Bill is a graduate of the University of North Carolina. He currently serves as president-elect of the Conservation Trust for North Carolina.

== Career ==
Following his graduation from UNC in 1972, Bill began his radio and television career as a reporter and news anchor for WKIX radio in Raleigh. After a three-year stint, he then worked for WTAR in Norfolk and KULF in Houston, before returning to Raleigh in 1979 as News Director for WRAL-FM. In 1984, he transitioned to television work with WRAL-TV, where he stayed for over 30 years. During that time, he served the station in a variety of roles, including News Director, weekend anchor, environmental reporter, and co-anchor of the morning and noon newscasts. Bill retired from WRAL-TV on June 29, 2018.

== Awards ==
Leslie has won 2 George Foster Peabody Awards, 5 Emmys and has also been awarded the Society of Professional Journalists National Distinguished Public Service Award, Robert F. Kennedy Journalism Award, National Headliner Award, Gavel Award, RTNDA Edward R. Murrow Award, UPI National Award for Features and twice won the North Carolina Journalist of the Year.

New Age Reporter named Leslie "Best New Artist" and his Christmas in Carolina album was named "Best Holiday Album" in 2005. Leslie's 2008 release "Blue Ridge Reunion" and 2010 release "Simple Beauty" were both named Best Acoustic Instrumental Album of the Year by international radio hosts who report to ZoneMusicReporter.com Peaceful Journey reached number one on the New Age Reporter's world music charts in December 2004, and Christmas in Carolina reached number two. Zone Music Reporter ranked "Simple Beauty" number one on the world music charts in September 2010. "Blue Ridge Reunion" was also number one on the Zone Music Reporter charts in September 2008.

The North Carolina Governor presented Leslie with the Order of the Long Leaf Pine for "extraordinary service to the state" during Leslie's final week on WRAL.

== Discography ==
- (2025) Paradise
- (2021) Celtic Peace
- (2019) Storyteller
- (2015) Across the Water
- (2013) Scotland: Grace of the Wild
- (2011) A Midnight Clear: Christmas in Mitford
- (2010) Simple Beauty
- (2008) Blue Ridge Reunion
- (2006) I Am a River
- (2005) Christmas in Carolina
- (2003) Peaceful Journey
- (2001) The Hunt by Bragh Adair
- (2000) Grace in Stone by Bragh Adair

== Videography ==
- (2002) Christmas in Carolina

== Books ==
- (2008) Blue Ridge Reunion
