= Wes Hohenstein =

American television meteorologist

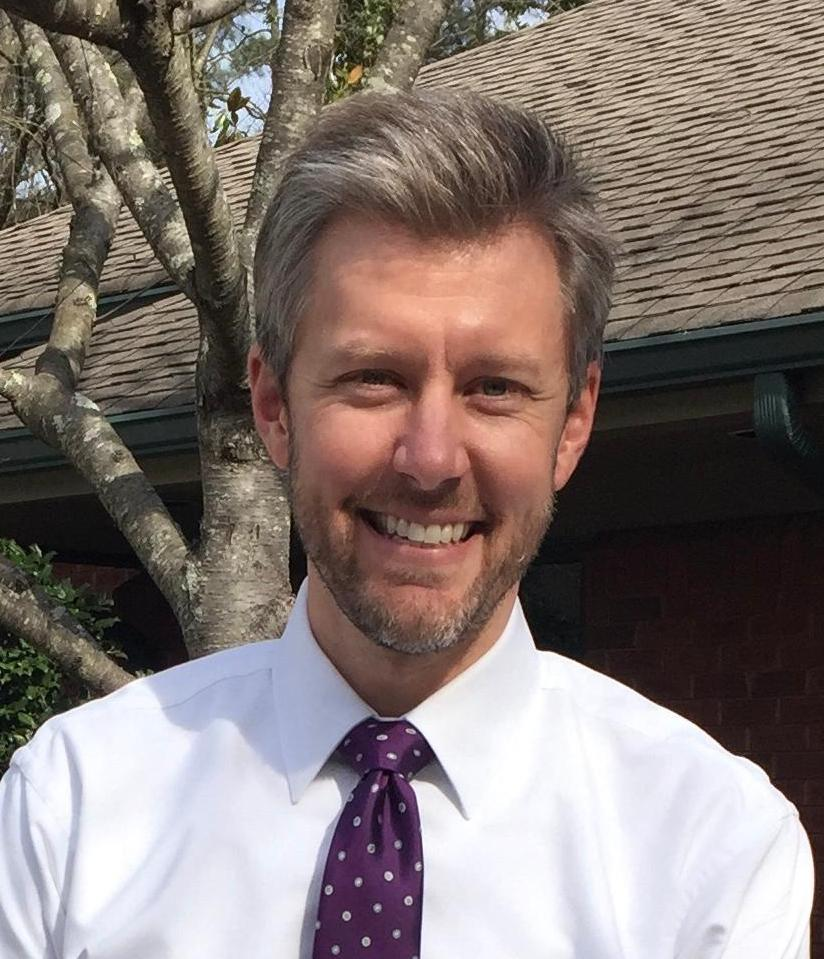
- Hohenstein in Durham in 2018
- Born: Wesley Hohenstein; Decatur, Illinois, U.S.
- Education: Saint Louis University (B.S. Meteorology)
- Occupation: TV meteorologist

Wes Hohenstein is an American on-camera meteorologist for WNCN (CBS 17) in Raleigh, North Carolina who holds the American Meteorological Society Seal of Approval. Since 2006, Hohenstein brings viewers the weather on the 5, 6 and 11 p.m. editions of CBS 17 News. He has also worked in Louisiana, Utah, Texas and Arizona.

== Career ==
Hohenstein earned a meteorology degree from Saint Louis University. He began his career in Lafayette, Louisiana working for the CBS station as a weekend meteorologist. After nearly three years at KLFY as weekend and then weekday morning meteorologist, he moved to Salt Lake City. While in Utah, Wes worked on the morning show for KTVX, the ABC affiliate.

In early 2003, Hohenstein arrived at KPRC-TV in Houston to replace morning meteorologist, Chuck George, who left the station in February 2003 to take care of his ill mother. George eventually landed at KOLD-TV in Tucson, Arizona where he is currently the chief meteorologist. While in Houston, Hohenstein was known for the Sunshine Award, where he visited schools across southeast Texas in the station's helicopter nearly every day. After departing from KPRC-TV in February 2006, Hohenstein was again linked to Chuck George, this time at KOLD-TV while briefly freelancing in Tucson at the same station.

Wes arrived in Raleigh in September 2006 as the Chief Meteorologist at WNCN (then-affiliated with NBC). He can be seen alongside anchors Angela Taylor, Russ Bowen and Jeff Jones every weeknight on CBS 17 News at 5, 6 and 11 p.m. He has also worked with news anchors Melanie Sanders, Pam Saulsby, Sean Maroney, Donald Jones, Bill Fitzgerald and Penn Holderness in the past at WNCN. His weather reports can also be heard on some Cumulus Broadcasting radio stations in the Triangle and Fayetteville.

In 2011, Hohenstein had the misfortune of swallowing a bug live on TV one day during his weather broadcast and, thanks to the Internet, made news all around the world. The station started a promotional campaign in 2012 where Hohenstein is presenting weather facts at the beginning only to reveal an odd setting for the promo part of the way through. The most unusual of these promos has Hohenstein presenting a weather fact standing in an area lake while in a shirt and tie. The promos end with the line "I'm Chief Meteorologist Wes Hohenstein and that's a fact." These promos were well-received in the market and won an Emmy Award for the station in 2014.

Hohenstein has also been a part of several changes on the evening anchor desk at WNCN. Evening news anchor Penn Holderness left the station at the beginning of 2014 followed by news anchor Pam Saulsby departing in the summer of 2014. In February 2016, WNCN switched its affiliation from NBC to CBS with the former network now on WRAL-TV.

== Personal life ==
Hohenstein grew up in the St. Louis, Missouri and is a St. Louis Cardinals fan, he is married and resides in Wake County.
