= Wayland E. Poole House =

Historic house in North Carolina, United States

- U.S. National Register of Historic Places
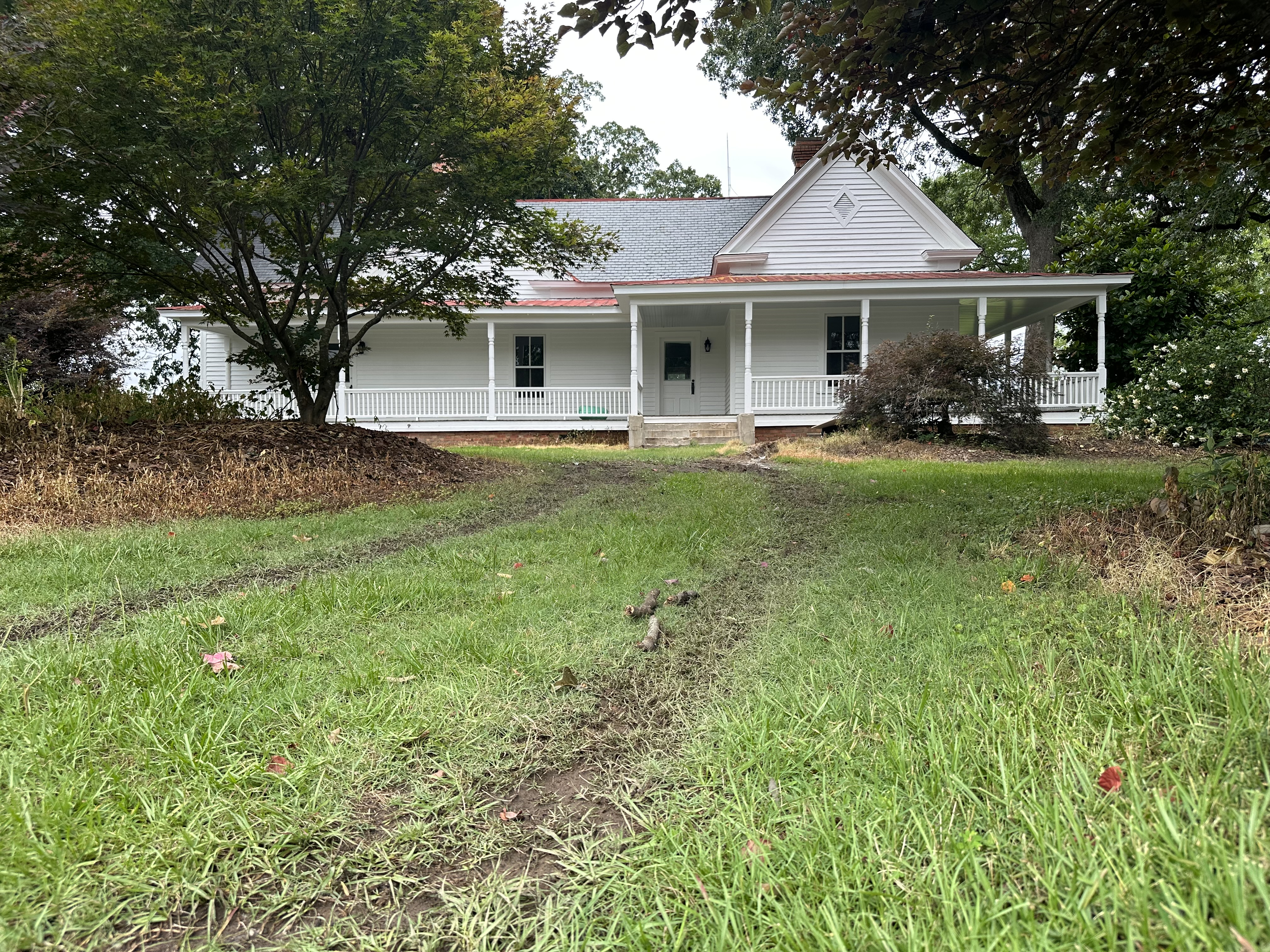

- Location within North Carolina Location within the United States
- Location: NC 2555, 0.2 mi. S of jct. with NC 1004 (4800 Auburn-Knightdale Rd.), Auburn, North Carolina
- Coordinates: 35°41′24″N 78°33′2″W
- Area: 0.2 acres (0.081 ha)
- Built: 1911
- Architectural style: Queen Anne
- MPS: Wake County MPS
- NRHP reference No.: 03000967
- Added to NRHP: September 25, 2003

The Wayland E. Poole House is a historic home located near Auburn, Wake County, North Carolina, a small, unincorporated community located to the east of Garner. Built in 1911, the house is a Queen Anne cross-gabled frame building with a wraparound porch.

In September 2003, the Wayland E. Poole House was listed on the National Register of Historic Places.

== See also ==
- List of Registered Historic Places in North Carolina
