= WDNC =

Sports radio station in Durham, North Carolina, United States

- Durham, North Carolina; United States
- Broadcast area: Raleigh–Durham; Chapel Hill; Research Triangle Park
- Frequency: 620 kHz
- Branding: The Buzz

Programming
- Format: Sports
- Affiliations: ESPN Radio; Carolina Panthers; Duke Blue Devils

Ownership
- Owner: Capitol Broadcasting Company; (WDNC-AM, LLC)
- Sister stations: WCMC-FM; WRAL; WRAL-TV; WRAZ; WNGT-CD

History
- First air date: 1928 (as 1370 WRBT, Wilmington)
- Former call signs: WRBT (1928–1931); WRAM (1931–1934)
- Former frequencies: 1370 kHz (1928–1934); 1500 kHz (1934–1941); 1490 kHz (1941–1948)
- Call sign meaning: Durham, North Carolina (city of license)

Technical information
- Licensing authority: FCC
- Facility ID: 17762
- Class: D
- Power: 1,500 watts day; 41 watts night
- Transmitter coordinates: 35°58′4.52″N 78°53′16.03″W
- Translator: 104.5 W283DE (Durham)
- Repeater: 99.9 WCMC-FM HD2 (Holly Springs)

Links
- Public license information: Public file; LMS
- Webcast: Listen live
- Website: The Buzz website

WDNC (620 AM) is a sports radio station licensed to Durham, North Carolina, but based in Raleigh, North Carolina. Owned and operated by Capitol Broadcasting Company as part of a cluster with NBC affiliate WRAL-TV, Fox affiliate WRAZ, and sister radio stations WCMC-FM and WRAL, the station's studios are in Raleigh, and the transmitter site is in Durham. WDNC is branded as The Buzz and is affiliated with ESPN Radio. In addition, WDNC is the flagship station for the Duke Blue Devils and is the local affiliate of the Charlotte Hornets.

== History ==
What is now WDNC was first licensed June 19, 1928, as WRBT (1370 AM) in Wilmington, North Carolina, which changed its call sign to WRAM in 1931. Durham's first radio station went on the air in February 1934, when then-Mayor W.F. Carr and several investors saw the need for a radio station in what was then the state's third-largest city. They bought WRAM and moved its license and equipment to studios in Durham atop the Washington Duke Hotel downtown at the corner of Corcoran and Chapel Hill Streets (later known as the Carolina and the Jack Tar Hotel; the structure was imploded in 1975). The newly relocated station signed on with 100 watts at 1500 AM as CBS affiliate WDNC. In 1936, WDNC was purchased by the Herald-Sun Newspapers, publishers of the Durham Morning Herald and The Durham Sun. At this time, the station's studios were moved into the Herald-Sun's building at 138 East Chapel Hill Street, literally next door to the Washington Duke Hotel. In 1938, WDNC increased its power from 100 to 250 watts.

The NARBA frequency realignment of 1941 saw the station relocate to 1490 AM. During this time, their antenna was located near present-day Forest Hills Park on South Street. WDNC's last broadcast from this site came on February 28, 1948. On the next day, February 29 — a Leap Day — WDNC abandoned its 1490 dial position and 250-watt signal for a new three-tower directional array on Shocoree Drive in western Durham, which operated with 5,000 watts daytime and 1,000 watts nighttime at a new frequency, 620 AM. That same day, WDNC also signed on its FM sister station, WDNC-FM, at 105.1 MHz, and WDNC's former 1490 dial position was taken over by a new station, WSSB (now WDUR).

In 1952, WDNC's parent company, the Herald-Sun Newspapers, applied to build a TV station in Durham on the city's newly allotted VHF channel 11. The owners of cross-town competitor WTIK had also applied for channel 11. The two parties later joined their efforts under the banner "Durham Broadcasting Enterprises" and signed on WTVD, channel 11 on September 2, 1954. In 1957, Durham Broadcasting sold WTVD to Albany, New York-based Capital Cities Broadcasting in 1957 (the same Capital Cities which bought the ABC TV network in the mid-1980s).

In October 1954, Hurricane Hazel caused significant damage in Raleigh, North Carolina. All of the city's radio stations were off the air, so WDNC aired news for the city's residents.

In the late 1970s, Buddy Poole, a former employee of WTIK, hosted the "Country Lovin'" morning show and worked in sales.

WDNC remained a CBS affiliate and the home of big band and popular standards until 1991, when their focus shifted towards more talk-based programming. In 1992, WDNC and its FM sister station, by now known as WDCG "G-105", relocated to Park Forty Plaza, just off Interstate 40 along NC Highway 55 in southeastern Durham, as the newspaper abandoned their downtown building for a new facility at 2828 Pickett Road in southwestern Durham. Shortly thereafter, the newspaper, wanting to focus more on its publishing divisions, put the two radio properties on the market. It was around this time that radio ownership rules were being relaxed.

WDCG was sold in 1993, but there were no takers for WDNC. In 1994, the company entered into a local marketing agreement (LMA) with Capitol Broadcasting Company (CBC), which allowed the Raleigh-based company control over WDNC's sales, marketing and programming with an option to buy. Capitol, already in the process of moving their minor league baseball team, the Durham Bulls, into the new Durham Bulls Athletic Park being built by the city, announced plans to move WDNC into the ballpark upon its completion in 1995. In the meantime, the station would operate from the basement of the new Herald-Sun building. Capitol redubbed the station the "Smart Choice for News and Sports", and, in late 1995, implemented an all-news format under the handle, "The News Station", using the Associated Press' all-news network supplemented with reports from the WRAL-TV newsroom. After three years, the agreement proved non-profitable for CBC. In 1997, Curtis Media Group took over the LMA from Capitol, replacing the news-centered schedule with more syndicated talk shows and paid programming until it bought the WDNC license from the Herald-Sun in 2000.

In November 2002, WDNC began a simulcast with Raleigh station WDNZ (now WQDR), 570 AM. That arrangement lasted until November 1, 2005, when WDNC entered into yet another LMA, this time with McClatchey Broadcasting, then-owner of WRBZ "850 the Buzz", a more locally oriented sports talk station. The station flipped to sports talk as "620 The Bull".

From July 2006 to June 2007, WDNC was home to an afternoon talk show featuring former ECU football head coach Steve Logan, before moving on to take the offensive coordinator position at Boston College.

Late in 2008, Don Imus returned to the Triangle for the first time since the incident involving the Rutgers women's basketball team. Imus replaced Mike and Mike in the Morning as WDNC de-emphasized ESPN Radio programming.

On August 10, 2009, Curtis Media (which still owned the station) sold WDNC and sister station WCLY to Capitol Broadcasting Company, in exchange for the North Carolina News Network. The move enabled Capitol to concentrate its sports programming across three channels, with WDNC and WCMC-FM receiving some carry-over programming from WRBZ (which Curtis Media received from McClatchey Broadcasting), while WCLY would carry Spanish-language sports programming from ESPN Deportes Radio. WDNC was expected to change its handle to 620 the Buzz beginning in September 2009, but the official changeover happened on November 2 with Adam Gold and Joe Ovies transferring their morning show over from WRBZ.

In 2013, WDNC joined CBS Sports Radio but continued to air Dan Patrick.

In April 2014, WDNC signed on a translator at 99.3 FM in Morrisville, serving Raleigh. In October, it added another translator at 96.5 FM in Durham. They serve mainly to fill in the gaps in the main signal.

On April 25, 2017, the Federal Communications Commission issued a construction permit for Capitol Broadcasting to move WDNC's transmitter from the station's long-time West Durham location on Shocorree Drive to a diplex arrangement with WDUR 1490 AM, at the latter's transmitter site on Nixon Street in southeastern Durham. This also authorized WDNC to reduce its 5,000 watt daytime power to 1,500 watts non-directional, and its 1,000 watt nighttime power to 41 watts non-directional. By late June 2017, WDNC had built out the construction permit and was broadcasting from its new site. The three towers at its former Shoccoree Drive transmitter site were removed in late October/early November 2017.

On May 1, 2018, WDNC rebranded from "The Buzz" (which continued on WCMC-FM HD2 and the 96.5 and 99.3 translators) to "The Ticket" (which moved from WCLY, which flipped to adult album alternative). On July 31, 2022, WDNC switched back to "The Buzz" branding, in a simulcast with WCLY and WCMC-FM HD2.

== Translator ==
Call sign	Frequency	City of license	FID	ERP (W)	Class	Transmitter coordinates	FCC info
W283DE	104.5 FM	Durham, North Carolina	200547	180	D	35°51′59″N 79°10′0.5″W	LMS

== WDNC past on-air staff ==
WDNC has a history developing personalities. Below are some of a few.

- Jim Sackett (????-1997)
- Tom Britt
- Tom Gongaware
- Will Vickers
- Melinda Stubbee
- Tom Guild
- Rob Friedman
- Bill Hard
- Doc Searls (weekends, 1974)
- Rita Chapman (1980 - 1983)
- Tony Wike
- Gaylord "Jay" Wood (1958–1962)
- Pat Patterson
- Cabell Smith
- Eddie Crabtree
- Bo Bierly
- Barry Brown
- Kathy Reid
- Andy Poe
- Bob Harris
- Jeff Dantre
- Tony Peters
- Rollye James
- Tom Young (novelist)
- Easy Gwynn (moved to WIBC Indianapolis)
- Fred Hazeltine (moved to WRNL Richmond, Virginia)
- John Dean (morning personality after World War Two)
- Woody Woodhouse (sports director 1940s)
- Ed Higgins (news director)
- Tony Rigsbee
- Steve Logan
- Frank Morock
- Morgan Patrick (MoJo In The Morning)
- Joe Ovies (MoJo In The Morning)
- Mark Thomas (Mornings)
- Mike Maniscalco (Mornings)
- Lauren Brownlow (Mornings)
- Demetri Ravanos (Mornings)
- Bomani Jones
- Eroll Reese (The Sports Shop)
- Kevin "K-Mac" McClendon (The Sports Shop)
