= Tom Young (novelist) =

American writer

Tom Young (born 1962 in Raleigh, North Carolina) is an American novelist. He is known primarily as the author of the military thrillers The Mullah's Storm, Silent Enemy, The Renegades, The Warriors, and Sand and Fire. Young served in the Iraq and Afghanistan wars with the West Virginia Air National Guard. Young's military experience inspired his debut novel, The Mullah's Storm, which garnered positive reviews. The Mullah's Storm, Silent Enemy, and The Renegades received Gold Medal awards from the Military Writers Society of America. Silent Enemy, The Renegades, and The Warriors received starred reviews from Publishers Weekly.

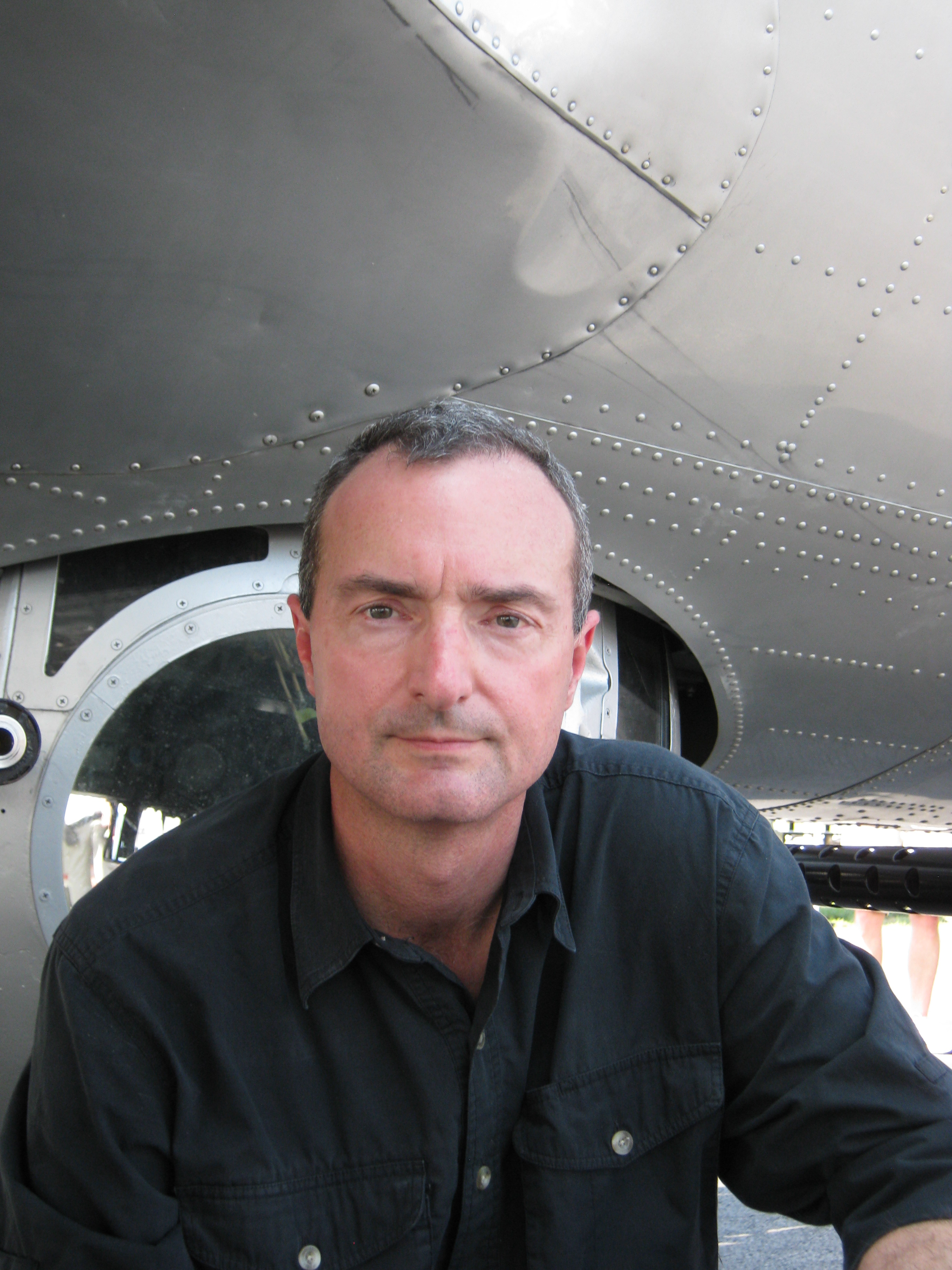
Novelist Tom Young (1962- )

== Career ==
Young began his writing career as a journalist. He received BA and MA degrees from the University of North Carolina at Chapel Hill, and he worked as a reporter and anchor at WDNC Radio in Durham, North Carolina. Young also worked as a writer, editor, and newsroom supervisor for the broadcast division of the Associated Press for ten years. During his time at AP, Young joined the Air National Guard, where he served as a crew chief and flight engineer on the C-130 Hercules with the Maryland Air National Guard and later on the C-5 Galaxy with the West Virginia Air National Guard. Young retired from the Air National Guard in 2013.

Since 2010, Young has written a series of military procedurals that dramatize modern combat operations. Prior to that, his published works about the Iraq and Afghanistan wars were nonfiction. The anthology Operation Homecoming: Iraq, Afghanistan, and the Home Front in the Words of U.S. Troops and Their Families included Young's first-person account of flying over Iraq, titled "Night Flight to Baghdad." A panel of celebrated authors, guided by historian Andrew Carroll, chose the 89 contributors who were published in Operation Homecoming. "Night Flight to Baghdad" was also excerpted in Stars and Stripes (newspaper). (See also Operation Homecoming (book).)

Young's nonfiction book The Speed of Heat: An Airlift Wing at War in Iraq and Afghanistan is an oral history of the 167th Airlift Wing's missions in the Iraq and Afghanistan wars.

== Novels ==
1. Trash-Hauler's Ball: A Tale of Modern War (2003)
2. The Mullah's Storm (2010)
3. Silent Enemy (2011)
4. The Renegades (2012)
5. The Warriors (2013)
6. Sand and Fire (2014)
7. Phantom Fury (2014) (short novel published as an e-book)
8. The Hunters (2015)
9. Silver Wings, Iron Cross (2020)
10. Red Burning Sky (2022)
11. The Mapmaker: A Novel of World War II (2025)

== Nonfiction ==
1. The Speed of Heat: An Airlift Wing at War in Iraq and Afghanistan (2008)
