= WPJL =

- Knightdale, North Carolina; United States
- Broadcast area: Raleigh-Durham
- Frequency: 1240 kHz

Programming
- Affiliations: EWTN Global Catholic Radio Network, Ave Maria Radio Network

Ownership
- Owner: Divine Mercy Radio
- Sister stations: WETC, WFNE-LP

History
- First air date: March 20, 1939; 87 years ago (as WRAL)
- Former call signs: WRAL (1939–1965); WRNC (1965–1978)
- Call sign meaning: "We Proclaim Jesus Lord"

Technical information
- Licensing authority: FCC
- Facility ID: 73884
- Class: C
- Power: 1,000 watts unlimited
- Transmitter coordinates: 35°46′25.00″N 78°37′9.00″W

Links
- Public license information: Public file; LMS
- Website: www.catholic540am.org

WPJL (1240 kHz) is a non-commercial AM radio station, licensed to Knightdale, North Carolina, and serving the Research Triangle. The station, owned by Divine Mercy Radio, simulcasts the Catholic radio format broadcast by WETC.

WPJL is authorized for 1,000 watts non-directional.

== History ==
The station signed on the air on March 20, 1939, as WRAL in Raleigh. Its power was 250 watts by day and 100 watts at night, broadcasting on 1210 kHz. The studios were on Salisbury Street in downtown Raleigh. In 1946, it added an FM station, WRAL-FM, and in 1956 added a television station, WRAL-TV.

In 1941, the North American Regional Broadcasting Agreement (NARBA) was implemented, which moved most stations on 1210 kHz, including WRAL, to 1240 kHz. During those early days, the station was a network affiliate of the Mutual Broadcasting System.

Capitol Broadcasting sold WRAL in 1965, but kept the sister stations WRAL-FM and WRAL-TV. That required a change in its call sign, becoming WRNC, which stood for Raleigh, North Carolina. As WRNC, the station played Top 40 hits and then country music. In the 1960s the station was sold to Smiles Associates and in 1974 the format was changed to Christian radio. In 1978, the call sign was changed from WRNC to WPJL ("We Proclaim Jesus Lord"). The call sign was chosen to reflect the new orientation of the station.

The station aired a Christian talk and teaching radio format before going silent. Religious leaders heard on WPJL included Adrian Rogers, J. Vernon McGee, Joyce Meyer, Jim Daly, Nancy DeMoss Wolgemuth and Chuck Swindoll. WPJL went off the air July 31, 2023, and on August 16, 2023, it was authorized by the Federal Communications Commission to remain silent for up to 180 days.

On February 12, 2024, WPJL was sold to Divine Mercy Radio, in order to become a sister station to WETC in Wendell. At this time it changed from a commercial to a non-commercial station.

In June 2024, the station was given permission to temporarily operate with 250 watts, using a longwire antenna constructed at the WETC transmitter site. In August, the Construction Permit was modified to change the Community of license from Raleigh to Knightdale, and specify diplex operation from the WETC transmitter site.
