= Capitol Broadcasting Company =

American media company

Capitol Broadcasting Company, Inc.
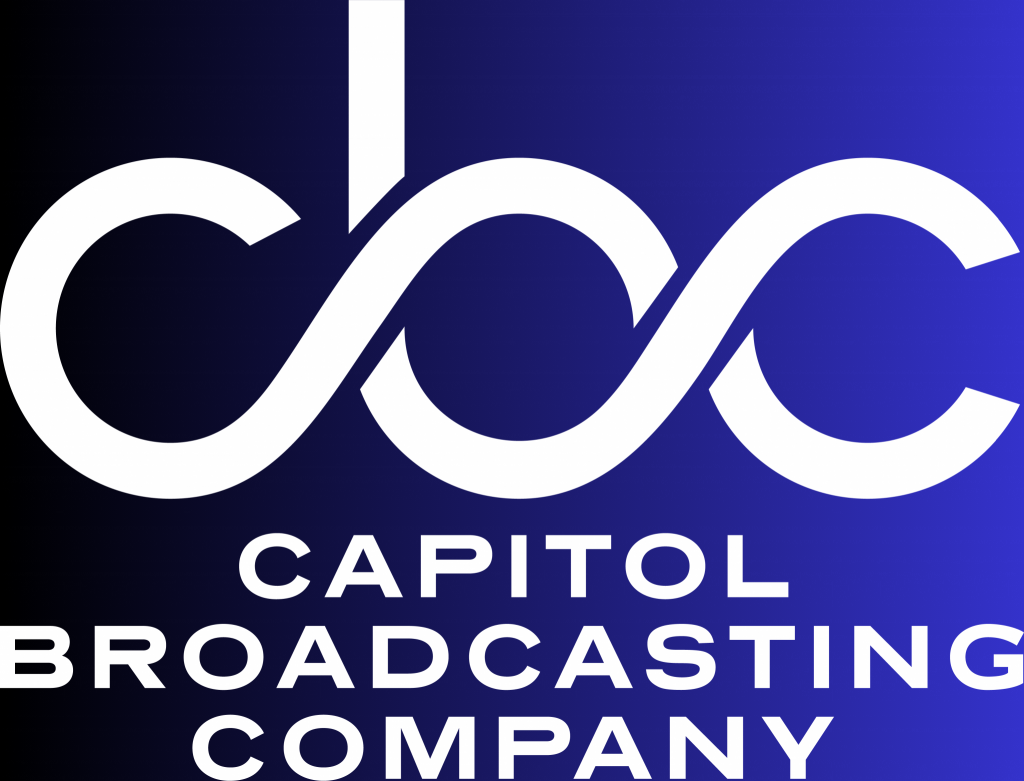
- Type: Private
- Industry: Media; Sports; Real Estate
- Founded: 1937
- Founder: A.J. Fletcher
- Headquarters: Raleigh, North Carolina, U.S.
- Key people: James F. Goodmon (Chairman); James F. Goodmon, Jr. (President/CEO); Tim Steele (Vice President/CFO)
- Products: Television; Radio; Sports; Real Estate
- Website: www.capitolbroadcasting.com

Capitol Broadcasting Company, Inc. (CBC) is an American media company based in Raleigh, North Carolina. Capitol owns three television stations and nine radio stations in the Raleigh–Durham and Wilmington areas of North Carolina and the Durham Bulls minor league baseball team as well as the Coastal Plain League, a college summer baseball league. It is one of the few family-owned broadcasting companies left in the country, owned by four generations of the Fletcher-Goodmon family.

== History ==
A.J. Fletcher founded the Capitol Broadcasting Company in 1937 when he founded Raleigh radio station WRAL (1240 AM, now WPJL). WRAL radio began transmission two years later in 1939, using a 250-watt transmitter, becoming Raleigh's second radio station (after WPTF). In 1942, Capitol created the Tobacco Radio Network, a farm news radio service that was discontinued in 2002. On September 6, 1946, Capitol Broadcasting received a license with the Federal Communications Commission for WCOY-FM (whose callsign was later changed to WRAL-FM), operating from a 250,000-watt transmitter. In 1960, CBC founded the North Carolina News Network, a statewide radio network that now provides news, weather, and sports content to about 80 radio stations. This property was sold to Curtis Media Group in 2009.

On December 15, 1956, Capitol Broadcasting's flagship television station WRAL-TV went on the air in Raleigh.

In 1979, WRAL-TV became the first television station in North Carolina to have a dedicated helicopter for newsgathering.

In 1987, Capitol acquired independent station WJZY-TV in Charlotte. The following year, Capitol also acquired another independent station, WTTV and its satellite station, WTTK, in the Indianapolis area. WTTV and WTTK were sold in 1991 to River City Broadcasting.

In 1996, WRAL-TV was granted the first experimental high definition digital television license in the United States by the Federal Communications Commission. On October 13, 2000, WRAL became the first television station in the world to broadcast a news program entirely in high-definition; the station would begin broadcasting all of its local newscasts in high-definition in January 2001.

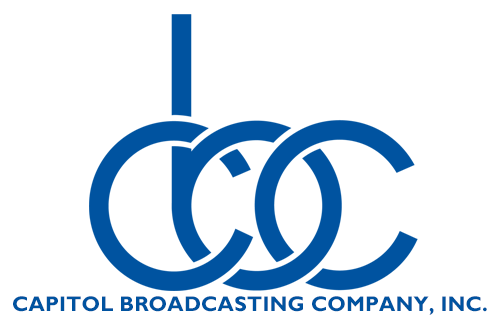
Former Logo

In 2001, Capitol purchased WFVT (now WMYT-TV) in Charlotte, creating the market's second television duopoly.

On October 14, 2005, Capitol Broadcasting signed on WCMC-FM on 99.9 MHz in Raleigh with a country music format, "Genuine Country".

In July 2008, Capitol Broadcasting acquired five radio stations in Wilmington from NextMedia Group for $12 million.

On April 14, 2009, Capitol Broadcasting and the City of Raleigh partnered to introduce the first mobile digital television in a public transit bus.

On January 28, 2013, Fox Television Stations announced that it had entered into an agreement to purchase WJZY and WMYT from Capitol for $18 million; the deal was completed on April 17.

On April 20, 2026, Capitol announced to sell its five Wilmington radio stations (Sunrise Broadcasting) to Curtis Media Group for $1.75 million.

== Major assets ==
(**) – Station that was built and signed-on by Capitol Broadcasting Company.

=== Broadcast stations ===
Media market	State	Station	Owned since
Raleigh–Durham	North Carolina	WCMC-FM	2005
Raleigh–Durham	North Carolina	WDNC	2009
Raleigh–Durham	North Carolina	WRAL**	1947
Raleigh–Durham	North Carolina	WRAL-TV**	1956
Raleigh–Durham	North Carolina	WRAZ	2000
Smithfield–Selma	North Carolina	WNGT-CD	2020
Wilmington	North Carolina	WAZO	2008
Wilmington	North Carolina	WILM-LD	1999
Wilmington	North Carolina	WILT	2015
Wilmington	North Carolina	WKXB	2008
Wilmington	North Carolina	WMFD	2008
Wilmington	North Carolina	WRMR	2011

=== Sports ===
- Durham Bulls – Triple-A minor league baseball team in the International League
- North Carolina Courage – minority stake
- Holly Springs Salamanders – collegiate summer baseball team in the Coastal Plain League
- Wolfpack Sports Properties – joint venture with Learfield IMG College covering NC State Wolfpack sports
- Coastal Plain League

=== Real Estate ===
- American Tobacco Historic District (Durham, NC)
- Mock, Judson, Voehringer Company Hosiery Mill (Greensboro, NC)
- Rocky Mount Mills (Rocky Mount, NC)

=== Investments ===
- TitanTV Media

== Former stations ==
=== Television ===
Media market	State	Station	Purchased	Sold	Notes
Bloomington	Indiana	WTTV	1988	1991	
Kokomo–Indianapolis	Indiana	WTTK	1988	1991	(Note: WTTK is a satellite of WTTV.)
Belmont–Charlotte	North Carolina	WJZY	1987	2013	
Rock Hill	South Carolina	WMYT-TV	2000	2013	

This list does not include KNAZ-TV in Flagstaff, Arizona, KKTV in Colorado Springs, Colorado and WJTV in Jackson, Mississippi. These television stations were owned by an unrelated and defunct Capitol Broadcasting Company based out of Jackson.

=== Radio ===
- North Carolina News Network (now owned by Curtis Media Group)
- WCLY – Raleigh, North Carolina (deleted in 2026)
- WILT – Wilmington, North Carolina (now owned by Bible Broadcasting Network with the call sign WYHW)
- WWMX – Baltimore (now owned by Audacy)
- WOCT-FM – Baltimore (now owned by iHeartMedia with the call sign WZFT)
- WRNL – Richmond, Virginia (now owned by Audacy)
- WRXL – Richmond, Virginia (now owned by Audacy)
- WSTF – Cocoa Beach, Florida (now owned by iHeartMedia with the call sign WJRR)
