= WRAZ (TV) =

Television station in Raleigh, North Carolina

- Raleigh–Durham–; Fayetteville, North Carolina; United States
- City: Raleigh, North Carolina
- Channels: Digital: 15 (UHF), shared with WRTD-CD; Virtual: 50
- Branding: Fox 50; WRAL News

Programming
- Affiliations: 50.1: Fox; for others, see § Subchannels

Ownership
- Owner: Capitol Broadcasting Company; (WRAZ-TV, Inc.)
- Sister stations: WRAL-TV; WNGT-CD; WRAL; WCMC-FM; WDNC

History
- First air date: September 7, 1995
- Former call signs: WACN (CP only, 1993–1995)
- Former channel numbers: Analog: 50 (UHF, 1993–2009); Digital: 49 (UHF, 2000–2019)
- Former affiliations: The WB (1995–1998)
- Call sign meaning: variation of WRAL-TV

Technical information
- Licensing authority: FCC
- Facility ID: 64611
- ERP: 805.4 kW
- HAAT: 607 m (1,991 ft)
- Transmitter coordinates: 35°40′29″N 78°31′39″W

Links
- Public license information: Public file; LMS
- Website: WRAZ schedule page on wral.com

WRAZ (channel 50) is a television station licensed to Raleigh, North Carolina, United States, serving as the Fox affiliate for the Research Triangle area. It is locally owned by the Capitol Broadcasting Company alongside NBC affiliate WRAL-TV (channel 5) and WNGT-CD (channel 34), which airs local news programming. The stations share studios at Capitol Broadcasting headquarters on Western Boulevard in Raleigh; WRAZ's transmitter is located near Auburn, North Carolina.

Though a construction permit was issued for channel 50 in 1986, it did not sign on until September 7, 1995. WRAZ, originally owned by Tar Heel Broadcasting but programmed by WRAL-TV from its first day on air, offered The WB as well as syndicated shows and a WRAL-produced 10 p.m. newscast. The station had been on the air only for several months when Fox—in the middle of a dispute with Sinclair Broadcast Group, owner of its local affiliate, WLFL—decided to change local stations from WLFL to WRAZ beginning in 1998. Coinciding with the switch, Capitol Broadcasting moved operations of WRAZ from Raleigh to an office building it owned in Durham to give the station a separate identity. In the 2000s, WRAZ gained a reputation for preempting Fox programming it found contrary to family values, including such reality shows as Temptation Island and Married by America.

After initially moving to give WRAZ a separate identity in the community, Capitol slowly folded it back into the main operation. In 2003, the newscasts were brought in line with those on WRAL, and the station returned from Durham to Raleigh in 2012. The station offers 48 1/2 hours a week of dedicated and simulcast newscasts from WRAL-TV.

== History ==
=== Construction and WB affiliation ===
In March 1985, five applicants were placed by the Federal Communications Commission (FCC) into comparative hearing to determine which one would receive a construction permit to build channel 50 in Raleigh. The commission awarded the permit to the L Broadcasting Company, owned by Fred and Evelyn Barber and Eleanor J. Brown. Fred Barber and Brown had broadcasting connections; the former was the general manager of WTAE-TV in Pittsburgh after previously serving in that post at WRAL-TV in Raleigh, and the latter was director of personnel for Gannett's television stations. The loser in the original decision was Cotton Broadcasting Company, whose owner, Grant Cotton, had put WLFL (channel 22) on the air and pledged to divest his interests in that station if awarded channel 50. This initial decision was appealed to the FCC review board by Cotton. The board overturned the initial decision and granted channel 50 to Cotton, finding that administrative law judge James Tierney had made a mistake in not accounting for his divestiture pledge. By 1990, Cotton had secured a transmitter site in Apex, North Carolina, and was about to search for studio space to put channel 50 into operation. He believed that the station's location in Raleigh would be an advantage over the region's second independent station, Fayetteville-based WKFT (channel 40).

Cotton filed to transfer the permit to Tar Heel Broadcasting, a not-for-profit company founded by Jim Layton, in 1994. The station announced its forthcoming existence as WRAZ in July 1995, including an affiliation with The WB. Tar Heel entered into a local marketing agreement (LMA) with the Capitol Broadcasting Company, owner of WRAL-TV, which provided its transmitter tower, programming, and facilities to operate the new station. It signed on the air on September 7, 1995, with a 50-episode marathon of The Andy Griffith Show.

The WRAZ license was sold by Tar Heel Broadcasting in 1996 to Carolina Broadcasting System, owned by former state deputy treasurer Thomas H. Campbell. The ownership change meant little in practice, as the LMA with Capitol Broadcasting remained intact. The owners did some public service programming independent from WRAL; in 1998, WRAZ began airing the Carolina Broadcasting System–produced NC Spin, a weekly political roundtable.

=== Fox affiliation ===
WLFL had been the Fox affiliate in the Raleigh–Durham market since the network started in 1986. By 1995, however, it was owned by Sinclair Broadcast Group. In late November of that year, Fox announced that it would move its network affiliation in Norfolk, Virginia, from Sinclair-owned WTVZ to WVBT, a station that—like WRAZ—was a WB affiliate programmed by one of the market's established stations, when its current affiliation agreement with Sinclair expired in September 1998. Three weeks later, Sinclair revealed in a terse announcement, citing nothing more than "different philosophical views about the future", that Fox had decided to replace WLFL with WRAZ in the network beginning in 1998; Sinclair apparently had little confidence in Fox plans to expand to daytime and late night slots as well as in the area of news. The additional network shows threatened to encroach on lucrative fringe periods where the Sinclair stations made money. Even though relations improved between Sinclair and Fox, the network had already signed affiliation agreements with its new Raleigh and Norfolk stations and carried out the switch on August 1, 1998, with WRAZ becoming the new Fox affiliate and WLFL switching from Fox to The WB.

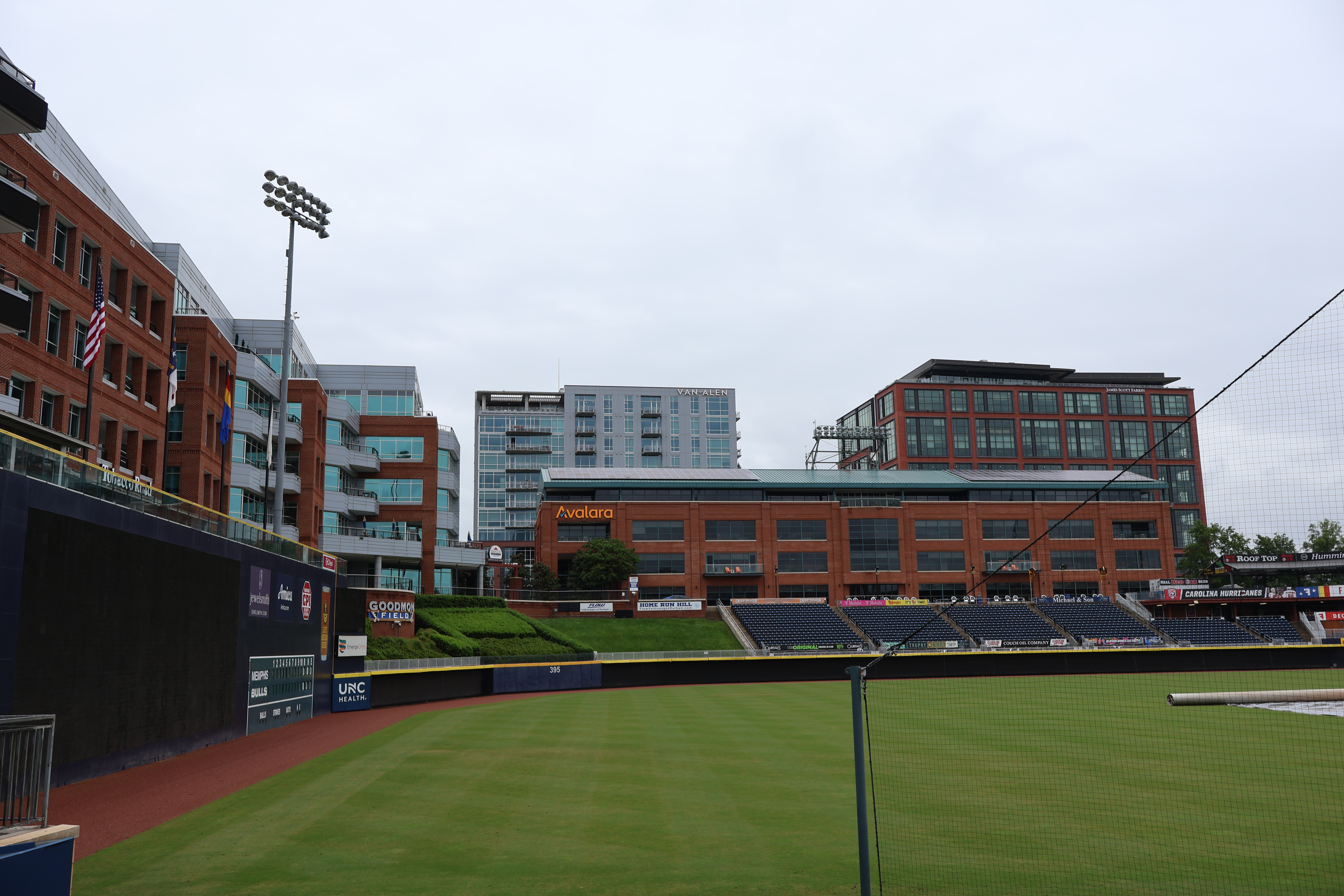
The Diamond View I office building, beyond right field of the Durham Bulls Athletic Park, housed WRAZ from 1998 to 2012.

After the affiliation switch, WRAZ was moved from the WRAL facilities in Raleigh to 18,000 square feet (1,700 m^{2}) on the first floor of the Diamond View I office building in Downtown Durham, next door to the Durham Bulls Athletic Park and the American Tobacco Campus—all owned and developed by Capitol. Capitol CEO James Goodmon deliberately moved WRAZ from Raleigh to Durham in order to give it a separate identity. After the FCC legalized duopolies in 1999, Capitol acquired the WRAZ license from Carolina Broadcasting for $1 million.

In the 2000s, WRAZ earned a track record of preempting Fox programming it deemed too risky or controversial. It was one of the few stations in the United States to refuse to air portions of Fox reality shows Temptation Island and Who Wants to Marry a Multi-Millionaire? The former was pulled after two contestants on the show were revealed to be parents to a young child. Tommy Schenck, WRAZ's general manager, told The News & Observer, "We're not going to support a program that could break up a family. We're not going to be a part of making light of an institution." Temptation Island instead aired on WKFT. After Capitol pulled Married by America from the WRAZ lineup, it eventually earned FCC plaudits as 169 other Fox affiliates were fined for airing an episode featuring strippers. Capitol viewed the programs as anti-family. In 2005, the station refused to air the Fox series Who's Your Daddy?, citing its treatment of adoption. In 2009, the station delayed the series premiere of Osbournes: Reloaded from its prime time slot to 11:35 p.m. and substituted episodes of Andy Griffith and Seinfeld.

WRAZ left Durham and returned to WRAL's facilities in 2012 in conjunction with a new joint master control facility handling both stations. To accommodate the relocation of 35 employees, 15,000 square feet (1,400 m^{2}) of space was added to the WRAL studios. In 2013, Capitol sold its other Fox affiliate, WJZY in Charlotte, to the network and received a renewal of its affiliation agreement for WRAZ.

=== Newscasts ===
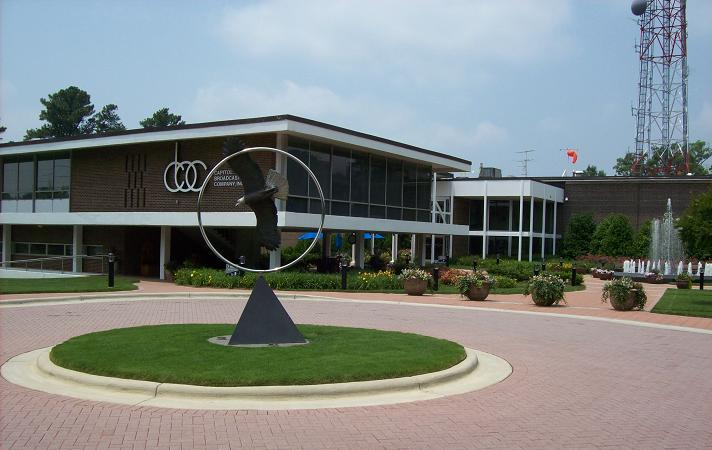
The WRAL studios in Raleigh, where WRAZ-TV has been based since 2012

Concurrently with its 1995 sign-on, WRAZ began airing a nightly prime-time newscast from WRAL-TV at 10 p.m. The half-hour newscast competed with WLFL's hour-long 10 p.m. news, which debuted two years prior. As with the rest of the station after the affiliation switch of 1998, Capitol decided to separate WRAZ's news presentation and talent from that of WRAL-TV, though it continued to come from the WRAL studios, to better match the Fox network's imaging and serve a different audience. After becoming the Fox affiliate, WRAZ's newscast doubled its viewership share year-over-year while WLFL slumped. In 2002, WRAZ debuted a 7 a.m. extension of WRAL-TV's morning show, Fox Morning Connection.

In 2003, Capitol Broadcasting opted again to tie WRAZ's news brand to WRAL's, rebranding the newscasts as WRAL News on Fox 50 and reintegrating it with WRAL's pool of on-air personalities. WLFL, whose newscast had remained a steady competitor to WRAZ's, slipped definitively behind when Sinclair converted the WLFL news operation to its News Central hybrid format; WLFL ceased producing newscasts in March 2006 and months later entered into an agreement with WTVD for local news coverage.

The morning newscast was extended to three hours with a 9 a.m. hour in 2019. By 2024, WRAZ aired 9 1/2 hours a day of news on weekdays, including an hour-long 10 p.m. newscast and simulcasts with WRAL-TV from 4:30 to 7 a.m., at noon, and at 4 p.m., plus a half-hour 10 p.m. newscast on Saturdays and Sundays for a total of 48 1/2 hours a week of news.

== Technical information ==
=== Subchannels ===
WRAZ/WRTD-CD's transmitter is located near Auburn, North Carolina.

Subchannels of WRAZ and WRTD-CD
License	Subchannel	Res.	Short name	Programming
WRAZ	50.1	720p	WRAZ-HD	Fox
WRAZ	50.2	720p	MeTV	MeTV
WRAZ	50.3	480i	DABL	Dabl
WRAZ	50.4	480i	WRAZ4	Heroes & Icons
WRTD-CD	54.1	480i	WRTD-CD	Telemundo

The WRAZ multiplex also includes a subchannel for WRTD-CD, the region's Telemundo owned-and-operated station.

=== Analog-to-digital conversion ===
WRAZ began digital broadcasting on May 1, 2000, from a transmission tower near Garner. The station ended regular programming on its analog signal, over UHF channel 50, on June 12, 2009, the official date on which full-power television stations in the United States transitioned from analog to digital broadcasts under federal mandate. WRAZ's digital signal continued to broadcast on its pre-transition UHF channel 49, using virtual channel 50.

The station was repacked from channel 49 to channel 15 on September 11, 2019, as a result of the 2016 United States wireless spectrum auction.
