= Auburn, North Carolina =

Unincorporated community in North Carolina, US

Auburn is an unincorporated community in Wake County, North Carolina, United States, just southeast of Raleigh. It lies approximately halfway between Garner and Clayton along Garner Road, a former alignment of US 70. The borders of the community are not well defined, but it is centered along Garner Road between Auburn Church Road and Guy Road.

== History ==
The North Carolina Railroad established a depot at Auburn, halfway between Garner and Clayton. A small community grew around the depot, which was later annexed into Garner.

== Landmarks ==
The Wayland E. Poole House is located in Auburn and listed on the National Register of Historic Places. Near Auburn, there are three of the broadcast towers for Triangle area media outlets: the WRAL HDTV Tower, the WTVD Tower and the WNCN Tower. The now-closed Mount Auburn School (a former elementary school and later Wake County Sheriff's Office training site) and the Clemmons Educational State Forest also lie near Auburn. Two large churches, Mt. Moriah Church on Garner Road, and Springfield Baptist Church, located on Auburn Knightdale Road, are also prominent landmarks. Like much of Wake County, the area has undergone a development boom in recent years, anchored by the Auburn Village residential development along Auburn-Knightdale Road, just north of Garner Road. A small industrial park on Greenfield Parkway lies immediately to the west of the community.
