= KVCW =

Television station in Las Vegas

ATSC 3.0 station

- Las Vegas, Nevada; United States
- Channels: Digital: 29 (UHF); Virtual: 33
- Branding: The CW Las Vegas; myLVTV (33.2)

Programming
- Affiliations: 33.1: The CW; 33.2: Independent with MyNetworkTV; for others, see § Subchannels

Ownership
- Owner: Sinclair Broadcast Group; (KUPN Licensee, LLC)
- Sister stations: KSNV

History
- Founded: August 26, 1987
- First air date: July 30, 1989
- Former call signs: KFBT (1989–2006)
- Former channel numbers: Analog: 33 (UHF, 1989–2009)
- Former affiliations: Independent (1989–1995, 1998–2006); The WB (1995–1998, September 5–17, 2006)
- Call sign meaning: Vegas CW

Technical information
- Licensing authority: FCC
- Facility ID: 10195
- ERP: 1,000 kW
- HAAT: 382.9 m (1,256 ft)
- Transmitter coordinates: 36°0′28″N 115°0′24″W
- Translator(s): 15 (UHF) Las Vegas (city)

Links
- Public license information: Public file; LMS
- Website: 33.1: cwlasvegas.com; 33.2: mylvtv.com

KVCW (channel 33) is a television station in Las Vegas, Nevada, United States, affiliated with The CW and MyNetworkTV. It is owned by Sinclair Broadcast Group alongside NBC affiliate KSNV (channel 3). The two stations share studios on Foremaster Lane in Las Vegas; KVCW's transmitter is located on an unnamed peak in Black Mountain Regional Park near Henderson (southwest of I-11/US 93/US 95).

== History ==
=== Early years ===
On April 22, 1987, the Federal Communications Commission (FCC) issued an original construction permit to 4-A Communications to build a new full-power television station, on UHF channel 33, to serve the Las Vegas market. 4-A Communications, owned by Lawrence and Teri DePaulis, became Channel 33, Inc. (which remained the station's licensee until 2015) in August 1987. The station, known as KFBT, went on the air on July 30, 1989, under a program test authority and was given a license one month later. The station's original transmitter was located in the McCullough Range southwest of Henderson. On July 20, 1990, a family ownership group headed by Daniel "Danny" Koker purchased Channel 33, Inc. Under the Kokers, KFBT was an independent station with a firmly local flavor and soon garnered much acclaim with features such as the scary B-movie showcase Saturday Fright at the Movies, hosted by Count Cool Rider, which aired at 10 p.m. Count Cool Rider was actually Danny Koker II, son of the station president and also one of the station's owners, who has since gone on to become a respected builder of custom motorcycles, as well as a regular expert on the History Channel series Pawn Stars and host of its spinoff, Counting Cars.

=== As a WB affiliate and return to independence ===
The station primarily broadcast older movies, sitcoms, and dramas during this era, as well as some Christian religious programs (as the senior Koker was a gospel musician) and professional wrestling (most notably World Class Championship Wrestling and the National Wrestling Alliance). KFBT became a charter affiliate of The WB at the network's launch on January 11, 1995, and remained an affiliate while owned by the Koker family. On December 18, 1997, the Koker family sold Channel 33, Inc. to Montecito Broadcasting Corporation with the sale being finalized on February 3, 1998. The same day that Montecito closed on its purchase of KFBT, it immediately entered into an agreement to be acquired by the Sinclair Broadcast Group, which Montecito entered into a local marketing agreement (LMA) to operate KFBT, until the transaction was completed. On March 1, 1998, Sinclair moved the WB affiliation to KUPN (channel 21, which later changed calls to KVWB, now KHSV); KFBT then became an independent station. The station was rebranded as "Gold 33" and began showing mainly newer syndicated programming. Sinclair completed its purchase of Montecito and Channel 33, Inc. in February 2000, resulting in the creation of the market's first duopoly between KFBT and KVWB.

=== As a CW affiliate ===
On January 24, 2006, CBS Corporation (the parent company of UPN) and the Warner Bros. unit of Time Warner announced that The WB and UPN would be shut down that September and have some of their higher-rated programs migrated onto a new jointly owned network called The CW. On February 22, News Corporation announced that it would start up another new network called MyNetworkTV. This new service, which would be a sister network to Fox, would be operated by Fox Television Stations and its syndication division, Twentieth Television. MyNetworkTV was created in order to give stations affiliated with UPN and The WB that were not mentioned as becoming CW affiliates another option besides becoming independent stations, as well as to compete against The CW.

Sinclair chose to affiliate KVWB with MyNetworkTV leaving The CW to join with either low-power UPN affiliate KTUD-CA (channel 25) or KFBT. Sinclair began negotiations with The CW to affiliate KFBT, and in April, when KTUD decided to go independent instead of pursuing a CW affiliation, KFBT was virtually assured the CW affiliation. An affiliation agreement was announced on May 2 and KFBT changed its call letters to the current KVCW on June 19, reflecting its pending affiliation with the new network. KVMY (now KHSV) affiliated with MyNetworkTV, when the network launched on September 5, two weeks before The WB was scheduled to shut down and The CW made its debut; as a result, KVCW rejoined The WB for the network's last two weeks of programming before switching its affiliation to The CW on September 18.

On May 15, 2012, Sinclair and Fox agreed to a five-year affiliation agreement extension for the station group's 19 Fox-affiliated stations until 2017. This included an option, that was exercisable between July 1, 2012, and March 31, 2013, for Fox parent News Corporation to buy a combination of six Sinclair-owned stations (two CW/MyNetworkTV duopolies and two standalone MyNetworkTV affiliates) in three out of four markets; KVCW and KVMY were included in the Fox purchase option, along with stations in Cincinnati (WSTR-TV), Raleigh (WLFL/WRDC) and Norfolk (WTVZ-TV). In January 2013, Fox announced that it would not exercise its option to buy any of the Sinclair stations in the four markets included in the option.

On August 13, 2013, KSNV-DT announced that the NBC soap opera Days of Our Lives would move to KVCW as of August 19. The move of the program was necessitated after KSNV changed its schedule to accommodate a 3 p.m. newscast. On September 3, 2014, Sinclair announced the purchase of KSNV from Intermountain West Communications Company for $120 million. As Sinclair already owned KVCW and KVMY, the company sold license assets (though not the programming) of one of the three stations to comply with FCC ownership restrictions, with the divested station's programming being relocated to the other stations. On November 1, 2014, KVMY's programming and MyNetworkTV affiliation moved to KVCW's second digital subchannel. Meanwhile, KSNV's call letters, talent, NBC affiliation and syndicated programming moved to KVMY's license. KSNV's former facility took the KVMY call letters before being divested to Howard Stirk Holdings under new call letters, KHSV. With the sale's completion, Sinclair now controls half of those stations. It also created a situation in which a CW affiliate is the nominal senior partner in a duopoly involving an NBC affiliate and a "Big Four" station. However, the combined operation is based at KSNV's studios.

== Programming ==
=== Sports programming ===
On February 3, 2021, the Henderson Silver Knights announced a partnership with KVCW to broadcast 10 home games during the team's inaugural season. This partnership would continue in the 2021–22 season.

On May 21, 2021, the WNBA's Las Vegas Aces announced a partnership with MyLVTV to televise 25 games during the 2021 WNBA season. The Aces later moved to KVVU-TV.

=== Newscasts ===
In 2003, former sister station KVWB established a news department and began airing an hour-long primetime newscast at 10 p.m. It was part of Sinclair's centralized News Central operation that was based at the company's headquarters in Hunt Valley, Maryland. National and international news segments, weather forecasts and some sports segments originated from the company's Hunt Valley facility, while local news and sports segments were based at KFBT/KVWB's Las Vegas studios. The news department was shared with KFBT, which aired its own local newscast at 7 p.m. It also aired "The Point", a one-minute conservative political commentary, that was required to be broadcast on all Sinclair-owned stations with newscasts. The news department was shut down at the beginning of March 2006, as were the majority of Sinclair's news operations under the News Central format.

KVWB later entered into a news share agreement with NBC affiliate KVBC (channel 3, now KSNV) to produce a nightly 10 p.m. newscast for channel 21. The newscast, originally titled News 3 at 10 on The WB Las Vegas, debuted on April 4, 2006, and was later renamed to News 3 at 10 on MyLVTV to correspond with KVMY's affiliation switch to MyNetworkTV. The program was discontinued on December 15, 2006, and moved to KVCW the following Monday under the title News 3 at 10 on The CW Las Vegas. On August 11, 2007, KVBC became the second station in the Las Vegas market to begin broadcasting its local newscasts in high definition and the KVCW broadcast was included in the upgrade. The 10 p.m. newscast originated from KVBC's studios on Foremaster Lane in Las Vegas near the border with North Las Vegas. KVBC also produced a 15-minute sports highlight program called Sports Zone, that aired weeknights at 10:45. Both programs were discontinued on September 28, 2009, and replaced with syndicated programming.

As of August 17, 2015, current sister station KSNV relaunched newscasts on KVCW. Wake Up with The CW Las Vegas airs from 7 to 9 a.m. and the half-hour broadcast of The CW Las Vegas News at Ten, airs at 10 p.m. Both newscasts compete with KVVU's 7 a.m. segment of Fox 5 News This Morning and the 10 p.m. airing of Fox 5 News at Ten.

== Technical information ==
=== Subchannels ===
Subchannels provided by KVCW (ATSC 1.0)
Channel	Res.	Short name	Programming	ATSC 1.0 host
33.1	1080i	TheCWLV	The CW	KTNV-TV
33.2	720p	My_LVTV	Independent with MyNetworkTV	KSNV
33.3	480i	ESTRELL	Estrella TV	KLAS-TV
33.4	480i	ThisTV	The Nest	KLAS-TV
33.5	480i	Nest	The Nest	KLAS-TV

=== Analog-to-digital conversion ===
When the FCC released its initial digital channel allocations on April 21, 1997, it had assigned KFBT's digital companion channel to UHF channel 32. The allocations met with considerable resistance from low-power broadcasters who would be displaced by the digital channel allocations, and on February 17, 1998, the FCC issued a revised final DTV allocation table. KFBT's original allocation would have displaced low-powered K31DO (now KNBX-CD), so the FCC substituted UHF channel 29 allowing channel 32 to be assigned to KMCC-DT in Lake Havasu City, Arizona, and eliminating a displacement there. KFBT was granted a permit to construct its digital facilities on January 26, 2001. Technical difficulties delayed construction of the full-power facilities requiring extensions of the construction permit.

On November 8, 2002, KFBT was granted special temporary authority (STA) to construct a low-power facility in order to comply with the FCC deadline for commencing digital broadcasting while the full-power facilities were still being built. The station, now known as KVCW-DT, completed construction of its full-power digital facilities in January 2007 and was granted a license on March 8. Back in 2006, the FCC required each station with a digital companion channel to select which one it would continue to use after the end of the transition period (at that time scheduled for February 17, 2009). KVCW-DT selected channel 29 as its final digital channel and returned the channel 33 license to the FCC. Digital television receivers display the station's virtual channel as its former UHF analog channel 33. Regular analog programming was dropped on February 18, 2009, with the station participating in the "Analog Nightlight" program for two weeks, with a broadcast explaining how to switch to digital reception.

=== ATSC 3.0 lighthouse ===
Subchannels of KVCW (ATSC 3.0)
Channel	Res.	Short name	Programming
3.1	1080p	KSNV	NBC (KSNV)
3.10	1080p	T2	T2
3.11	1080p	PBTV	Pickleballtv
3.20		GMLOOP	GameLoop
3.21		ROXi	ROXi
5.1	1080p	KVVU	Fox (KVVU-TV)
8.1	1080p	KLAS	CBS (KLAS-TV)
13.1	720p	KTNV	ABC (KTNV-TV)
33.1	720p	KVCW	The CW

Subchannel broadcast with digital rights management
Subchannel streamed via the Internet

On May 26, 2020, KVCW discontinued ATSC 1.0 broadcasts and became one of the first stations in the country (and the first in the Western United States) to begin broadcasting in ATSC 3.0.

=== Translators ===
City of license	Callsign	Channel	ERP	HAAT	Facility ID	Transmitter coordinates
Las Vegas	KVCW (DTS)	29	11.22 kW	43 m (141 ft)	10195	36°7′44.8″N 115°11′28.4″W
Pahrump	KVCW (DRT)	15	0.25 kW	−125.1 m (−410 ft)	10195	36°9′29.5″N 115°54′3.8″W
