= KSNV =

Television station in Las Vegas

- Las Vegas, Nevada; United States
- Channels: Digital: 22 (UHF); Virtual: 3
- Branding: Channel 3; News 3

Programming
- Affiliations: 3.1: NBC; for others, see § Subchannels

Ownership
- Owner: Sinclair Broadcast Group; (KUPN Licensee, LLC)
- Sister stations: KVCW

History
- First air date: January 23, 1955 (Note: Of KLRJ-TV on channel 2. The technical facility used by KSNV today traces its origins to KHSV.)
- Former call signs: KLRJ-TV (1955–1962); KORK-TV (1962–1979); KVBC (1979–2009); KVBC-DT (2009–2010)
- Former channel number: Analog: 2 (VHF, 1955–1967), 3 (VHF, 1967–2009)
- Former affiliations: ABC (secondary, 1955–1957); NTA (secondary, 1956–1961)
- Call sign meaning: Southern Nevada

Technical information
- Licensing authority: FCC
- Facility ID: 10179
- ERP: 1,000 kW
- HAAT: 382.9 m (1,256 ft)
- Transmitter coordinates: 36°0′27.3″N 115°0′26.9″W
- Translator(s): 14 (UHF) Pahrump; for others, see § Translators

Links
- Public license information: Public file; LMS
- Website: news3lv.com

KSNV (channel 3) is a television station in Las Vegas, Nevada, United States, affiliated with NBC. It is owned by Sinclair Broadcast Group alongside CW/MyNetworkTV affiliate KVCW (channel 33). The two stations share studios on Foremaster Lane in Las Vegas; KSNV's primary transmitter is located on an unnamed peak in Black Mountain Regional Park near Henderson.

What is now KSNV traces its origin to the launch of KLRJ-TV on channel 2 on January 23, 1955. KLRJ-TV was owned by Donrey Media Group and named for the Las Vegas Review-Journal newspaper; it was licensed to the Las Vegas suburb of Henderson and maintained studios in between the two cities. Shortly after starting KLRJ-TV, Donrey acquired Las Vegas radio station KORK; channel 2 became KORK-TV in 1962, when the FCC permitted KLRJ-TV to change its city of license to Las Vegas. The station moved from channel 2 to channel 3 on January 3, 1967, as part of a transmitter site relocation.

In 1971, the Las Vegas Valley Broadcasting Company, headed by attorney James E. Rogers, filed a competing application for channel 3. The Federal Communications Commission (FCC) called a hearing to weigh the new station proposal versus KORK-TV's renewal; the case centered on KORK-TV's use of "clipping", an illegal practice of airing local commercials over network-furnished material and advertising. The ensuing legal fight lasted throughout the 1970s. The FCC and federal appeals courts consistently denied Donrey a renewal of KORK-TV's broadcast license, but the Las Vegas Valley Broadcasting application was not finally approved until the end of the decade. On October 1, 1979, KORK-TV was replaced by KVBC, which continued with most of the same staff but built new studio and transmitter facilities at their present sites. The channel 3 takeover marked the beginning of Sunbelt Communications Company, later Intermountain West Communications Company, with KVBC as the flagship station.

While fending off a second and unsuccessful license challenge, under Rogers's ownership, KVBC rapidly improved in the late 1980s and 1990s from a distant second-place in local news ratings to a contender and market leader. In the late 2000s and early 2010s, the station's programming strategy evolved to remove many syndicated programs and replace them with newscasts; the call sign was changed to KSNV in 2010, matching Intermountain West's other Nevada stations. After Rogers died in 2014, Sinclair Broadcast Group acquired KSNV's assets and conducted a switch of technical facilities that allowed it to retain all of its programming while divesting the former KSNV license, now KHSV.

== KLRJ-TV: Early years ==
Channel 2 was originally assigned by the Federal Communications Commission (FCC) to Henderson, a city south of Las Vegas, when the commission lifted its multi-year freeze on TV station assignments in 1952. The allocation lay unused for nearly a year until it suddenly had two applicants in the span of several weeks. The first was the Southwestern Publishing Company, publisher of the Las Vegas Review-Journal, the city's afternoon newspaper. In the first television station application filed in the state, Southwestern had applied on August 16, 1950, for channel 8 at Las Vegas. When the freeze lifted, more applicants sought channel 8, including Las Vegas Television, a sister company to local radio station KLAS. Southwestern Publishing and Las Vegas Television entered into discussions to merge their bids, which fell apart when the talks were reported on the radio. That prompted Hank Greenspun, the publisher of the morning Las Vegas Sun, to file for channel 8. There were now three applications on file for the one channel. At the time, the FCC, seeking to work through a massive backlog of applications, prioritized uncontested channels. Southwestern Publishing then filed for channel 2 in Henderson on February 26; one day later, the Boulder City Broadcasting Company, owners of radio station KRAM in Boulder City, joined them, putting every commercial channel in or near Las Vegas in contested status.

For channel 2, the logjam broke when Boulder City Broadcasting Company withdrew from channel 2 contention so that some of its stockholders could participate in the contest for channel 13. The studios and 324-foot (99 m) transmission tower and antenna were built at a site on Boulder Highway, midway between Henderson and Las Vegas; the new station boasted that its studio was the largest between the Mississippi River and Los Angeles. Southwestern Publishing also signed to affiliate channel 2 with NBC.

KLRJ-TV began telecasting on January 23, 1955, as Nevada's third television station. It was the second Nevada station owned by Donald W. Reynolds, publisher of the Review-Journal; he also started KZTV, channel 8 in Reno. Reynolds then expanded his media interests with the 1955 acquisition of KOLO radio in Reno and Las Vegas radio station KORK (1340 AM). The sale was initially approved in April but held up until July after KLAS-TV, the station built on channel 8, charged that Reynolds was offering discounted rates for advertising between the Las Vegas-area TV station and newspaper as well as for the two Nevada TV stations. In addition to NBC programming, the station broadcast some programs from ABC, which did not have a primary local affiliate until KSHO-TV signed a contract in December 1957; it also briefly affiliated with the NTA Film Network, which began in 1956.

On November 19, 1962, KLRJ-TV became KORK-TV. The move coincided with the city of license changing from Henderson to Las Vegas after a petition by the station, though it remained in its Boulder Highway studios and was required by the commission to continue serving the Henderson area.

In 1965, KORK sought to move its transmitter to Potosi Mountain. However, if it did so, it would no longer be adequately spaced to other stations on channel 2. As a result, in May 1966, the FCC approved changes in four television allocations, including moving KORK-TV to channel 3 and changing a channel allocation for Boulder City from channel 4 to channel 5; it also switched channel assignments in Goldfield and Cedar City. The changeover to channel 3 was made on January 3, 1967. Simultaneously, Donrey inaugurated a microwave transmission link between Reno and Las Vegas, enabling Southern Nevadans to see news events in Northern Nevada.

Please check fire extinguishers—KORK and KVIQ. Matter of fact, all stations, check fire extinguishers. Can't afford to lose anymore stations. Ratings are bad enough now.

— NBC message to affiliates after fires

The studios of KORK-TV on Boulder Highway were destroyed by fire on the afternoon of March 6, 1972, leaving only the walls standing. The blaze broke out in an attic in the rear of the structure, where film and scripts were kept. These combustible materials were being heated by hot air rising from the transmitter room below, which was trapped in the storage area. KORK-TV moved into a disused studio in the new humanities building at the University of Nevada, Las Vegas, paying for the facilities by installing new lighting that would remain with the university. The station returned to the air a week after the fire; a new transmitter was installed inside a trailer, while the station rented a mobile production unit to provide a control room and color cameras. It was the second fire at an NBC affiliate in two weeks; a humorous NBC bulletin advised stations to "check their fire extinguishers". The station rebuilt in its existing footprint but with a new internal layout, moving back to Boulder Highway in September.

== 1970s license challenge ==
On September 1, 1971, a group of 18 Las Vegas professionals known as the Las Vegas Valley Broadcasting Company and headed by attorney James E. Rogers filed an application to build a new station on channel 3 in Las Vegas, conflicting with the renewal of KORK-TV's broadcast license. Two months later, KORK-TV responded with a full-page newspaper advertisement that compared Valley Broadcasting to the claim jumpers of the Old West, touted the station's advancements in technology, and declared, "We have too many years of painfully-gained experience, too much thought, planning and money invested, and too much consideration for the best interests of the viewing public to give up without a fight which we are confident we will win." The Rogers group's application followed a court ruling that threw out an FCC policy statement favorable to incumbent broadcasters at license renewal time. Its attempt to replace KORK-TV on channel 3 was one of the first challenger bids received by the commission in the wake of the court's action.

In the face of the license challenge, Donrey and Valley Broadcasting initially reached a deal to merge their television interests, pending FCC approval. By that time, the FCC was investigating Donrey and its stations for a practice called "clipping", a practice whereby the station aired local commercials over network commercials or other material while continuing to charge the network for the air time. This was not the only complaint about Donrey's operation of KORK-TV; William Hernstadt, the president of competitor KVVU-TV, charged that the Review-Journal gave preferential treatment in news articles, magazine covers, and TV listings to channel 3. In June 1972, the FCC sent the two applications to comparative hearing. For Donrey, the clipping investigation proved immediately costly. The FCC held up Donrey's proposal to buy KVOA in Tucson, Arizona, from Pulitzer Publishing Company over the matter; Pulitzer instead reached a deal with another group shortly after KORK-TV's license was designated for hearing.

Hearings opened in Las Vegas in March 1973. Reynolds admitted to "overloading", crowding local advertisements into network continuity and "clutter"; Ed Tabor, the general manager, downplayed clipping by calling it "a common practice in the industry". Valley Broadcasting stumbled in presenting its case. A full day of testimony, consisting of a key witness whose complaints to the FCC kickstarted the clipping case, was struck from the record; administrative law judge Chester Naumowicz rejected additional documentation provided by the challengers to support their bid. Naumowicz issued his initial decision in June 1974: a double denial. He found against Donrey's operation of KORK-TV, finding its correspondence "rife with inaccurate and misleading statements". However, he also refused to grant a permit to Valley Broadcasting over a series of financial complications, opting not to "gamble the public interest". Among the issues he cited in Valley's application was the conditioning of financing on a network affiliation and vice versa, as well as difficulties in obtaining the proposed transmitter site.

Naumowicz's initial decision was appealed to the full commission, which issued an identical ruling on a 6–0 vote in July 1976. The commission denied Donrey a renewal for KORK-TV while denying Las Vegas Valley Broadcasting Company a permit over financial qualifications. It instead moved to open the channel 3 facility to all filers. This decision was appealed by both parties, which asked the commission to reconsider. Donrey argued that the commission made an error and alleged that Broadcasting magazine had been leaked a copy of the decision; Valley Broadcasting objected to being found financially unqualified. The case came before the United States Court of Appeals for the District of Columbia Circuit, which in 1978 likewise denied KORK-TV a renewal. However, the D.C. Circuit reversed and remanded to the FCC the part of the order denying the Las Vegas Valley Broadcasting Company application. One last attempt by Donrey to appeal this order to the Supreme Court was rebuffed on April 30, 1979, marking the end of a legal fight that had stretched nearly eight years.

KORK-TV continued to operate for five more months; the FCC did not grant a construction permit to the Las Vegas Valley Broadcasting Company until August. The commission permitted the station to remain on the air by way of two short-term license extensions. Had the commission not granted the time extensions, KORK-TV would have been forced to cease broadcasting. A pause in the operation of channel 3 could have resulted in NBC switching stations and affected the financial viability of channel 3. KVVU-TV, the market's independent station, had recently been bought by a group led by Johnny Carson and Herb Kaufmann, the latter of whom reportedly went to New York and negotiated with network executives.

== KVBC ==
On October 1, 1979, in compliance with a condition of its permit, Las Vegas Valley Broadcasting Company assumed control of channel 3, changing the call letters to KVBC. The new licensee retained all of KORK-TV's staff, save the general manager, and all of the old licensee's programming. It continued to operate from the Boulder Highway studios while a new studio was under construction and retained the existing transmitter site until it could relocate to a new tower atop Black Mountain. The new studios, on Foremaster Lane, had previously been a skating rink. When Valley Broadcasting assumed channel 3, it suffered from deteriorating equipment and staff morale, as well as low ratings for its newscasts. In the February 1980 Arbitron sweeps, at 6 p.m., KVBC had 15 percent of the audience; KVVU's rerun of Maude attracted 16 percent, while KLAS dominated with half the viewers.

Shortly after going on air, Valley Broadcasting experienced a cash crunch and asked its shareholders to contribute an additional $1.4 million. This divided shareholders and produced a dispute within the company as to the best strategy to take. Between 1982 and 1983, a minority group of stockholders led by Louis Wiener Jr. attempted to gain control of the station. The dissidents sought to control costs, whereas Rogers and his allies favored increased spending in order to raise the station's ratings. The dynamics led Rogers to make a deal with James McMillan whereby he bought the stock for no negotiated cost; however, once the cost was negotiated, Rogers could not pay, and McMillan resumed ownership of the stake. A related deal was designed to protect McMillan from foreclosure.

=== Hernstadt license challenge ===
Less than four years after taking over channel 3 following its own license challenge, the Rogers group found itself on the other end of a license fight. In September 1983, the family of William Hernstadt—now a Nevada state senator—filed for channel 3. The FCC opened hearings on the matter in October 1985. Shortly before the hearing, Hernstadt revealed his case in FCC filings. It centered around the Rogers–McMillan stock purchase and other ownership and control issues he believed merited denying KVBC renewal of its license. FCC lawyers, while siding with KVBC, found its ownership to have "deplorable" compliance with reporting changes in ownership interests. The case plodded on through 1987, having become entangled with a Rogers-led license challenge to KCRL-TV in Reno and expanded to cover reporting of a stake Valley Broadcasting had acquired in a radio station in San Diego.

FCC administrative law judge Joseph Stirmer ruled in favor of renewing KVBC in 1988, citing its "enviable record of service" to Las Vegas. Hernstadt appealed unsuccessfully to the FCC review board and the full FCC; in December 1990, the D.C. Circuit ruled that the FCC acted properly in renewing KVBC.

=== A local news turnaround ===
Beginning in the mid-1980s, the station made a top-to-bottom overhaul of its local news presence. In late 1985, the station debuted a new logo, new mobile unit to cover live breaking news, and other investments. The station manager wrote a memo to the staff declaring, "The news wars have begun!" Within several years, KVBC became a player in the Las Vegas news ratings and was credited as the first serious competitor to KLAS in years; in total-day ratings, it was solidly ahead of KLAS and KTNV-TV (channel 13). It did so with a format that was lighter than its competitors; Review-Journal media critic Ken White called KVBC's rise "beyond reason" given the "infotainment" content of its newscasts. Channel 3 ended the decade neck-and-neck with KLAS in most news time slots.

KLAS and KVBC continued to fight for first place until the mid-1990s, when channel 8 fell and channel 3 pulled into a commanding first-place position, leading in most time slots for the rest of the decade. It was the first station in the market to have newscasts at 4 and 5 p.m. It also extended its reach with a radio station, KRBO 105.1. This news-talk station was owned by Compass Communications, which contracted with a Sunbelt Communications subsidiary for its programming; KVBC reporters and the station's 5 p.m. newscast were heard on the FM frequency. The station changed its call sign to KVBC-FM in 1996. Sunbelt also had a similar station, KRNV-FM, in Reno. Both stations were transferred to EXCL Communications in 1999 and flipped to Spanish-language formats, with KVBC-FM becoming KQRT.

=== Increasing challenge in the 2000s ===
In the early 2000s, while KVBC continued to edge KLAS in time slots where it aired newscasts, KVVU's 10 p.m. newscast gained steam, attracting more viewers in younger demographics.

When KVWB ceased airing its own newscasts from News Central in March 2006, KVBC stepped in to replace them with a 10 p.m. newscast; this moved to KVCW before being discontinued and replaced with a 10 p.m. newscast for KTUD-CD. In 2009, at the height of the Great Recession, the station axed 14 positions. KVBC launched a new morning newscast, Wake Up with the Wagners, in 2007. The program was hosted by the husband-and-wife pair of Dana and Kim Wagner, who both worked for the station but had only briefly co-anchored. The Wagners continued to host mornings together until 2022, when Dana moved to an evening shift.

KVBC began broadcasting a digital signal on October 22, 2002, and became digital-only on the national transition date of June 12, 2009. Its original digital signal broadcast on channel 2, using virtual channel 3.

== KSNV ==
On July 9, 2010, KVBC changed its call sign to KSNV. The change was touted by the station as an update for the digital era, swapping the VBC (Valley Broadcasting Company) for a reference to Southern Nevada Communications, the Sunbelt division that operated KVBC. It also aligned KSNV with its IWCC sister stations, KRNV in Reno and KENV in Elko.

I didn't go into broadcasting to be in someone else's business. The only thing we as broadcasters can do better than cable is local news. So that's where I have to go.

— Jim Rogers

In the final years of Rogers ownership of channel 3, the station heavily invested in increasing its news and public affairs output in lieu of acquiring more expensive syndicated programming. In 2009, the station began airing Ralston Reports, a public affairs talk show hosted by Nevada political journalist Jon Ralston, which continued on KSNV for five years. The station continued replacing syndicated shows with newscasts in 2013 by debuting a 3 p.m. news hour (replacing the network Days of Our Lives) and a 7 p.m. news hour where the station had once carried the syndicated game shows Jeopardy! and Wheel of Fortune. The news expansion led to the addition of 25 new jobs at the station. Under this plan, by 2016, the station would have no daytime syndicated programming, filling gaps between network shows exclusively with local newscasts as contracts for syndicated shows lapsed. However, losing some of the syndicated shows—particularly the highly-rated Jeopardy! and Wheel—proved costly. Those game shows moved to KLAS, improving their ratings year-over-year and lifting channel 8's news ratings in the process. Meanwhile, the newscast that replaced them on channel 3 represented a 60-percent ratings decrease.

=== Sale to Sinclair ===
In January 2014, Jim Rogers announced he had bladder cancer for the second time. By that time, he had begun to sell some of the stations IWCC owned in Wyoming and Idaho, but he still owned the Nevada, Montana, and Arizona stations. Rogers died on June 15, 2014, at the age of 75.

Sinclair Broadcast Group announced that it would buy KSNV from the Rogers family for $120 million in September 2014. Sinclair already owned a duopoly in Las Vegas, KVMY (channel 21) and KVCW (channel 33), and could not own a third broadcast license. As a result, the company planned to sell the license assets (though not the programming) of one of the three stations to comply with FCC ownership restrictions, with the divested station's programming being moved to the other stations. Eighty to eighty-five percent of proceeds from the KSNV sale were set aside to form the Rogers Educational Foundation, which would support students and educators in Southern Nevada.

On November 1, 2014, Sinclair began the process of realigning KSNV, KVCW, and KVMY. It moved the MyNetworkTV programming to a subchannel of KVCW and relocated KSNV's call letters, programming, and channel number to what had been KVMY. The KSNV technical facility then became KVMY, retaining virtual channel 21 but not the MyNetworkTV programming, and was sold to Howard Stirk Holdings, a company owned by conservative commentator Armstrong Williams. The $150,000 purchase price primarily consisted of the transmission facility. The call sign on channel 21 changed to KHSV on March 7, 2016.

Sinclair broke from the Rogers plan to eradicate syndicated programming. In December 2014, it canceled Ralston Reports as well as two other programs, What's Your Point? and Vegas Inc. It also reinstated Days of Our Lives, which had been airing on KVCW, while adding the game show Family Feud to the lineup. At the same time, the station added an hour of newscasts to its lineup by expanding at noon and adding a half-hour at 6:30 p.m. KSNV debuted 7 a.m. and 10 p.m. newscasts on KVCW in August 2015.

Under Sinclair, ratings for KSNV's local newscasts have fallen. In May 2015, less than a year after taking control, the station placed second to KLAS in early evening news but led its competitors at 11 p.m. By July 2022, the station had fallen into last place at 11 p.m. in total households and viewers 25–54. At the end of 2023, KSNV grounded its news helicopter, "Sky 3", after 34 years; rising maintenance costs were cited.

Between 2014 and 2019, KSNV provided newsroom and office support for KBLR (channel 39), the Telemundo station in Las Vegas. About 1,000 square feet (93 m^{2}) of space at KSNV was dedicated to supporting KBLR. This ended when KBLR moved into new studio facilities, replacing the offices at KSNV and its previous studio on Fremont Street.

=== Notable current on-air staff ===
- Jeff Gillan – political reporter, fill-in anchor, and former host of What's Your Point?, since 2009
- Jim Snyder – anchor, 1991–1994 and since 1998

=== Notable former on-air staff ===
- Terry Care
- Sophia Choi – anchor and reporter, 2007–2010
- Reed Cowan – anchor, 2012–2022
- Colin Cowherd – sports anchor and reporter, 1988–1994
- Trace Gallagher
- Rick Kirkham – reporter, 1980s
- Sue Manteris – anchor and reporter, 1989–2011
- Jessica Moore – anchor and reporter, 2010–2016
- Rory Reid – Democratic pundit on What's Your Point?, 2014
- Jack Williams – news anchor, 1974–1975

== Technical information ==
=== Subchannels ===
KSNV's transmitter is located on an unnamed peak in Black Mountain Regional Park, near Henderson. The station's signal is multiplexed:

Subchannels of KSNV
Subchannel	Res.	Short name	Programming
3.1	1080i	NBC3	NBC
3.2	720p	ROAR	Roar
3.3	480i	Charge!	Charge!
3.4	480i	Comet	Comet
3.5	720p	My_LVTV	Independent with MyNetworkTV (KVCW)

Broadcast on behalf of another station

=== Translators ===
KSNV is broadcast from a digital replacement translator in Pahrump and six other rebroadcasters in southern Nevada:

- Caliente: K11CN-D
- Overton: K14ND-D
- Pahrump: K17CL-D, K33MJ-D
- Panaca: K30QE-D
- Pioche: K03CM-D
- Ursine: K02EG-D

=== Experimental facility ===
Authorized regularly on a temporary basis and tied to the KSNV license is an experimental facility on channel 33 from the Black Mountain transmitter site. Annually since 2018, this facility has been activated to demonstrate new television technologies such as ATSC 3.0 at the Consumer Electronics Show and NAB Show trade conventions, both held in Las Vegas.
