= Jon Ralston =

American journalist and political commentator

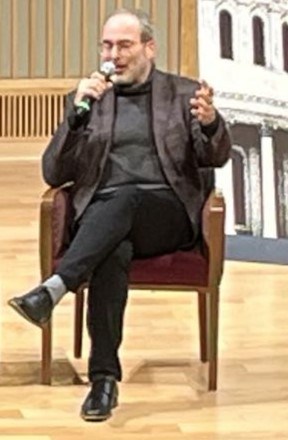
- Ralston in 2026
- Born: July 13, 1959 (age 67); Morristown, New Jersey, U.S.
- Education: Cornell University (BA); University of Michigan (MA)
- Occupation: Journalist
- Years active: 1984–present
- Employer(s): Las Vegas Review-Journal (1984–1999); Las Vegas Sun (1999–2012); Politico (2015–2016); Reno Gazette-Journal (2015–2016)
- Television: KLAS-TV and Las Vegas One (1999–2010); KENV-DT, KRNV-DT and KSNV (2010–2014); KLVX and KNPB (2015–2016); KTNV-TV (2016)
- Political party: Independent (1994–present)
- Children: 1
- Website: Official website

Jonathan Mark Ralston (born July 13, 1959) is an American journalist, political commentator, and former talk show host. His show, Ralston Live, was seen each weekday on the two Nevada PBS stations in Las Vegas and Reno until being discontinued on June 21, 2016.

In 2017, Ralston launched The Nevada Independent (TNI), a nonprofit online news site devoted to Nevada business and government.

== Early life and education ==
Ralston was born in Morristown, New Jersey and grew up in Buffalo, New York, where he attended Williamsville South High School. He received a Bachelor of Arts in English from Cornell University in 1981 and a Master of Arts in journalism from the University of Michigan in 1983.

== Career ==
After completing his master's degree, Ralston moved to Las Vegas, Nevada, to become a night-time police reporter for the Las Vegas Review-Journal in 1984. In 1986, he was assigned to cover politics, and in 1989, he became a full-time political columnist for that paper. In 1999, he sold his newsletter side project to Greenspun Media Group and began writing for the Las Vegas Sun, one of its newspapers. His book, The Anointed One: An Inside Look At Nevada Politics, was published in September 2000. It recounted how Kenny Guinn won his first election, the Nevada governor's race in 1998, with backing from the casino industry and political insiders. Ralston was a guest on Rachel Maddow's show in 2011 to discuss the scandal-provoked resignation of Sen. John Ensign (R-NV).

In September 2012, Ralston left the Las Vegas Sun. In 2014, Ralston appeared as an actor in the Amazon original series Alpha House. His KSNV Ralston Reports TV show ended on December 12, 2014. On January 7, 2015, he began writing for the Reno Gazette-Journal. As of 2016, did a television show, Ralston Live, a different email newsletter called Flash, and a twice-weekly column for the Reno Gazette-Journal. His show was discontinued on June 21, 2016, by KLVX and KNPB.

=== Nevada election predictions and analysis ===
Ralston analyzes Nevada elections, especially based upon early voting results and accurately predicted both the presidential election in Nevada and the Nevada Senate race in 2016 on the basis of early voting data. In 2020, he accurately predicted the presidential election in Nevada and the two Las Vegas-area House races in which he offered predictions. In 2022, he accurately predicted the Nevada Senate race, two of the three Las Vegas-area House races, the gubernatorial race, the lieutenant gubernatorial election, the Secretary of State race, the Attorney General election, the Treasurer race, and the Controller race. In 2024, he incorrectly predicted that Kamala Harris would win the presidential election in Nevada.

=== 2016 Nevada Democratic state convention ===
Reporting on the Nevada Democratic state convention in 2016, Ralston tweeted that supporters of U.S. Senator Bernie Sanders had thrown chairs. The Associated Press filed a similar report. NPR originally repeated Ralston's reporting as did other media outlets, but removed it after only being able to find evidence of a chair being lifted in the air but not of one being thrown. Snopes, a website that documents and debunks urban legends and rumors, identified Ralston as the source for the statement that Sanders supporters had thrown chairs and said there was no evidence to support it.

=== The Nevada Independent ===
Ralston launched a digital news publication in early 2017 titled The Nevada Independent, and Ralston announced he would disclose the sources of its donations.

== Personal life ==
Ralston married Sarah Hoeveler, a former TV reporter and anchor, and they had one child. They divorced and Ralston in 2012 married Jessica Sferrazza, a Reno city councilor. The couple divorced in 2017.
