= Las Vegas One =

Former news channel

- Las Vegas One logo during the mid-2000s
- Country: United States
- Broadcast area: Las Vegas Valley

Programming
- Language(s): English

Ownership
- Owner: Cox Communications; KLAS-TV; Las Vegas Sun; Prime Cable (during 1998)
- Sister channels: KLAS-TV

History
- Launched: April 6, 1998; 26 years ago
- Closed: January 9, 2010; 15 years ago

Las Vegas One (sometimes abbreviated as LV1) was a 24-hour news channel in the Las Vegas Valley that operated from April 6, 1998, to January 9, 2010. It began as a joint venture between the Las Vegas Sun, KLAS-TV, and Prime Cable, and was a sister channel to KLAS' local Channel 8. At its launch, Las Vegas One was among approximately two dozen 24-hour local news channels in the United States, and was the first in Las Vegas.

== History ==
Las Vegas One was a joint venture between the Las Vegas Sun, Prime Cable, and KLAS-TV (also known as Channel 8). The Greenspun family, owners of The Greenspun Corporation and the Las Vegas Sun, had wanted to start a 24-hour local news channel in Las Vegas for more than two decades. The idea of starting a local television news channel originated in 1969, when Las Vegas Sun editor Brian Greenspun's parents sold the KLAS channel to Howard Hughes.

Prime Cable, majority owned by the Greenspun family, had become among the 10 largest cable companies in the United States during the 1990s, at which point the Greenspun family had the ability to make the 24-hour news channel a reality. Prime Cable was the predominant cable company in the Las Vegas Valley, with more than 300,000 cable customers. Prime Cable general manager Harris Bass stated, "A news channel in the fastest growing city in the United States is a natural. In a city that never sleeps, the news shouldn't either." KLAS officials acknowledged that competing against prime time programming would be difficult for Las Vegas One, but believed that the channel would be successful.

Las Vegas One began broadcasting at 9:00 p.m. on April 6, 1998, on Prime Cable channels 1 and 39. Las Vegas One was among approximately two dozen 24-hour local television news channels in the United States, and was the first such channel in Las Vegas. The channel had been in the planning stage for more than a year prior to its launch. Las Vegas One had its own news staff, and also utilized the staffs and resources of Channel 8 and the Las Vegas Sun. Las Vegas One was a sister channel to KLAS Channel 8. At the time of launch, Las Vegas One broadcast from both the KLAS studio located near the Las Vegas Strip and from a new studio built at the Las Vegas Sun office. The channel's general manager was Bob Stoldal, who previously worked in the same position for KLAS.

In May 1998, Cox Communications announced plans to purchase Prime Cable, a deal that would include Cox having 33 percent ownership of Las Vegas One. The sale was completed later that year. As of July 1998, Las Vegas One reached only 65 percent of the viewing audience and did not have enough viewers to be included in the Nielsen ratings. As of 1999, the channel included 65 percent of news air time and 19.5 percent of commercial air time. Ratings for the channel increased during 1999 and 2000 when it provided complete coverage of the Ted Binion murder trial. On December 1, 2003, Las Vegas One was moved from channel 39 to channel 19 as part of a Cox channel rearrangement. Las Vegas One also remained on channel 1. As of November 2009, Las Vegas One garnered viewers from only 69,000 households, out of 721,780 households counted by A.C. Nielsen Co.

Las Vegas One ceased operations at 2:00 a.m. on January 9, 2010. Brian Greenspun stated, "I think Las Vegas ONE has served the community well over the last 11 years or so, but the community has not taken to Las Vegas ONE the way the three of us had hoped they would when we started it." Linda Bonnici, the general manager of Las Vegas One, stated, "New technology has significantly changed how consumers access local news and information. Those changes, in addition to the continued economic challenges, have driven all media outlets to reevaluate how to best serve Southern Nevada."

Stoldal believed that the channel needed more local programming, an idea that could not be implemented due to a limited budget. Stoldal also stated that the channel suffered as a result of being based at KLAS' studios: "We were living in someone else's house. We had to do our programming in between Channel 8's. There was a period of time, from about 3 o'clock to 7, when we couldn't produce any programs." Jeff Gillan, a former anchor for the channel, said, "All the partners did their level best, but they also had things that really demanded more attention than LV1. (Channel 8) had their newscasts and the Greenspuns had the Sun and all their papers and Cox had its cable system to run. We just got crowded out. It's to the credit of everyone that it lasted as long as it did." On the day of the channel's closure, KLAS launched a local all-news channel on Cox's channel 128, broadcasting simulcasts and repeats of KLAS and CBS newscasts.

== Programming ==
Las Vegas One included live newscasts that were later repeated on the channel. Other programming included repeats of KLAS' Eyewitness News, which aired a half-hour after initial broadcast on KLAS. Additional programs included The Wall Street Journal Report and Bloomberg Business News. Point of View Vegas, a daily news talk show, premiered on the channel on July 12, 1999, as an extension of the Las Vegas Sun, featuring reporters from the newspaper. The show's team also worked closely with editors of the Las Vegas Sun. The program had been in development since December 1998, and was the first of two programs to be added to the channel in 1999. A one-hour morning news program, DayONE Las Vegas, premiered in March 2000 with Nancy Byrne as anchor. It was the channel's third local news program.

The Ralston Report, a 30-minute public affairs program, premiered in May 2000, with Jon Ralston as anchor. Point of View Vegas ended in February 2001, and was cancelled later that year. The Ralston Report ended in March 2001, when it was replaced by a new 30-minute program, Face to Face with Jon Ralston, taking the former time slot of Point of View Vegas. Gillan joined Las Vegas One in May 2001, to anchor the channel's NewsOne at 9 nightly newscast. In November 2002, Gillan began hosting a business program titled In Business Las Vegas, named after the Las Vegas Sun's sister newspaper of the same name.

In November 2003, DayONE Las Vegas was replaced by a morning talk and entertainment show hosted by Clint Holmes and Sheena Easton. The program, titled Vegas Live! With Clint Holmes and Sheena Easton, ended production in February 2004 and moved to KVVU-TV later that year under the name The Vegas Show.

Because of poor economic conditions, News One at 9:00 p.m. was suddenly cancelled in October 2009, a decision that surprised Gillan. Since 2005, the program had won two local Emmy Awards for best evening newscast. In Business Las Vegas and Face to Face with Jon Ralston continued to air on the channel until cancellation in December 2009. The two programs subsequently moved to KVBC-TV, while Las Vegas One had no original programming left prior to the end of operations in January 2010. In its final weeks, the channel relied on simulcasts and rebroadcasts of KLAS' news.
