= KBLR =

Television station in Paradise, Nevada

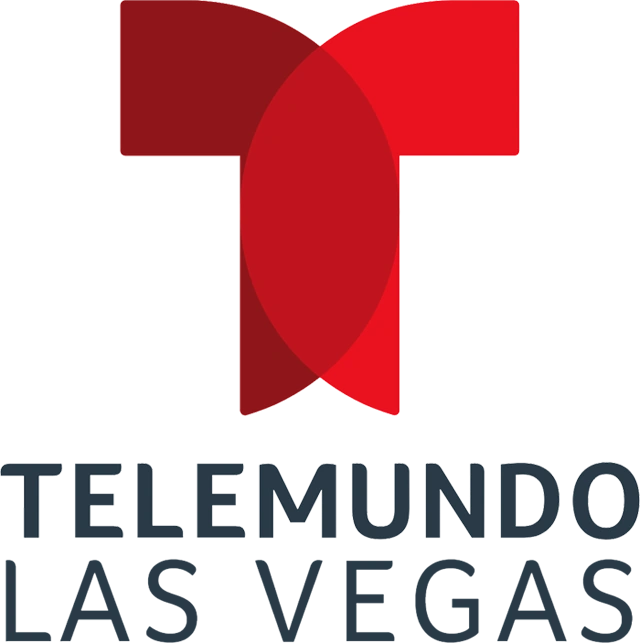
- Paradise–Las Vegas, Nevada; United States
- City: Paradise, Nevada
- Channels: Digital: 20 (UHF); Virtual: 39
- Branding: Telemundo Las Vegas (general); Noticiero Las Vegas (newscasts)

Programming
- Affiliations: 39.1: Telemundo; for others, see § Subchannels

Ownership
- Owner: Telemundo Station Group; (Telemundo Las Vegas License LLC)

History
- Founded: 1988
- First air date: April 20, 1989
- Former channel numbers: Analog: 39 (UHF, 1989–2009); Digital: 40 (UHF, until 2018)
- Former affiliations: Independent (1989–1991); Dark (1991−1994); Ion Television (DT3, until 2020)
- Call sign meaning: Initials of wife of station founder Glenn Rose

Technical information
- Licensing authority: FCC
- Facility ID: 63768
- ERP: 1,000 kW
- HAAT: 371 m (1,217 ft)
- Transmitter coordinates: 36°0′34.43″N 115°0′23″W

Links
- Public license information: Public file; LMS
- Website: www.telemundolasvegas.com

KBLR (channel 39) is a television station licensed to Paradise, Nevada, United States, broadcasting the Spanish language Telemundo network to the Las Vegas area. Owned and operated by NBCUniversal's Telemundo Station Group, KBLR maintains studios on Polaris Avenue in Las Vegas, and a transmitter on Black Mountain near Henderson.

== History ==
=== Early years ===
The station was founded in 1988 by Glenn Rose, an entrepreneur who found early success as a franchisee in Southern California of Nutrisystem and used the wealth from that effort to found KBLR, a station whose call letters were inspired by the initials of his wife.

During its first two years of operation, it aired a schedule heavy on public domain movies and TV shows, professional wrestling, and programs no other Las Vegas stations wanted to air. A lack of compelling programming and competition from three other independent stations, including Fox-affiliated KVVU-TV, left KBLR unable to carve out a niche in the market. After a proposed sale to a company known as The Gaming Network fell through in December 1990, the station added programming from Channel America, a service primarily used by low-power stations.

After dropping much of its programming to carry the contractual minimum with Channel America and air primarily Christian programming in February 1991, the station went dark on July 12, 1991. The station then became the centerpiece of a proposal by Source Venture Capital to relaunch KBLR as a western superstation with content from Willie Nelson's Outlaw Channel and purchased British series, which was slated for an October 15 launch that was postponed several times and ultimately scrapped when Rose's investors would not go along with the deal.

In 1993, Rose sold the station to a partnership known as Summit Media, headed by Scott Gentry, to be converted to the first full-power Spanish-language television station in Las Vegas and a Telemundo affiliate. At the time, the only Spanish-language outlet in the area was K27AF "KAFT-TV" (not to be confused with the PBS station in Fayetteville, Arkansas), affiliated with Univision. The station resumed broadcasting on March 1, 1994.

=== Sale to NBC ===
On February 23, 2005, NBC bought Telemundo affiliate KBLR from Summit Media for $32.1 million. The sale was completed on May 24, 2005.

In August 2008, KBLR confirmed reports from the Las Vegas Sun and announced at the city council meeting that its studio facility would be moving to Neonopolis on Fremont Street, which is part of the Fremont Street Experience. The station's studios were first occupied on January 20 with full completion on February 22, 2009. KBLR began broadcast operations from the new facility that day at 4:45 a.m.

The station previously had a repeater in Reno, Nevada, K52FF (channel 52); this station has since gone dark, and its license canceled.

As a result of the sale to NBCUniversal, KBLR is the only network owned-and-operated station in the Las Vegas media market.

Sometime in the late-2010s, the station moved its studios from Neonopolis to Polaris Avenue in Las Vegas.

== News operation ==
As the first full-power Spanish station in Las Vegas, the station launched local news, at first at 6 p.m. and then 11 p.m. during the week and then with weekend news. Previously, in 1994, it had launched a dubbed repeat of the 5 p.m. newscast from KLAS-TV at 6 p.m.

As part of budget cuts at NBCUniversal, all Telemundo newscast production was shifted to the news hub in Dallas in 2007. In late 2010, most Telemundo stations restored locally produced news, but KBLR's newscasts continued to be produced elsewhere, this time to KTAZ in Phoenix, which utilized Las Vegas-area reporters and Phoenix-based anchor talent. The 6 p.m. program was presented live, while the 11 p.m. broadcast was pre-taped.

On June 30, 2014, KBLR debuted locally produced 6 p.m. and 11 p.m. newscasts, hiring more than a dozen new staffers including anchor Beatriz Moncayo and weather presenter Leticia Castro. The newscast was produced utilizing the technical resources of NBC affiliate KSNV (channel 3), owned by Sinclair Broadcast Group.

== Technical information ==
=== Subchannels ===
The station's signal is multiplexed:

Subchannels of KBLR
Subchannel	Res.	Short name	Programming
39.1	1080i	KBLR-HD	Telemundo
39.2	480i	TelEx	TeleXitos
39.3	480i	CRIMES	NBC True CRMZ
39.4	480i	COZI	Cozi TV
39.5	480i	Oxygen	Oxygen
39.6	480i	Nosey	Nosey

=== Analog-to-digital conversion ===
KBLR shut down its analog signal, over UHF channel 39, on June 12, 2009, the official date on which full-power television stations in the United States transitioned from analog to digital broadcasts under federal mandate. The station's digital signal remained on its pre-transition UHF channel 40 until August 22, 2018, at which point it was licensed to move to channel 20.
