= Jeff Gillan =

American journalist and TV news anchor (born 1957)

- Born: Jeffrey Scott Gillan; June 1, 1957 (age 69); Milwaukee, Wisconsin, U.S.
- Education: American University (M.A.); Georgetown University (B.A.)
- Occupation: Journalist
- Years active: 1986–2022
- Employer(s): Landmark Media Enterprises (2001–2009); Intermountain West Communications Company (2009–2014); Sinclair Broadcast Group (2014–2022)
- Television: KFSM-TV (1986–1987); WSLS-TV (1987–1990); WKOW (1990–2001); KLAS-TV (2001–2009); KSNV (2009–2022)

Jeffrey Scott Gillan (born June 1, 1957) is a retired American journalist and regional television news anchor.

== Education ==
Gillan attended college in Washington, D.C., receiving his undergraduate degree from Georgetown University and his master's degree in journalism and public affairs from American University.

== Career ==
Gillan worked for eight years as an anchor and the managing editor at the cable channel Las Vegas One and KLAS-TV (Channel 8) before joining KSNV-TV (Channel 3) in November 2009 as its assistant news director. He left a TV anchor job at WKOW in Madison, Wisconsin, after 11 years to take the Las Vegas One position.

In 2022, after 13 years as managing director and anchor at KSNV, Gillan retired, having worked for over 30 years in the broadcast news industry. Several Nevada dignitaries were part of his retirement announcement broadcast on KSNV, including former governor of Nevada, Steve Sisolak and former mayor of Las Vegas, Carolyn Goodman, among others.

== Awards and nominations ==
- 2006, won Pacific Southwest Regional Emmy Award for KLAS-TV
- 2009, won Pacific Southwest Regional Emmy Award for KLAS-TV
- 2016, won Pacific Southwest Regional Emmy Award for KSNV
