= KMCC =

Television station in Laughlin, Nevada

- Laughlin–Las Vegas, Nevada; United States
- City: Laughlin, Nevada
- Channels: Digital: 32 (UHF); Virtual: 34
- Branding: The Spot Vegas 34

Programming
- Affiliations: 34.1: Independent / ABC (alternate); for others, see § Subchannels

Ownership
- Owner: E. W. Scripps Company; (Ion Television License, LLC)
- Sister stations: KTNV-TV

History
- First air date: August 21, 2003
- Former channel numbers: Analog: 34 (UHF, 2003–2009)
- Former affiliations: NBC (as satellite of KVBC, 2003–2005); TeleFórmula (2005–2006); Multimedios Television (2006–2009); Mega TV (2009–2010); VasalloVision (2010–2012); MundoFox/MundoMax (2012–2016); Action Channel (2016–2018); Azteca América (2018–2020); Ion Plus (2020–2021); Ion Television (2021–2023; now on 34.2)
- Call sign meaning: Meridian Communications Company (original licensee)

Technical information
- Licensing authority: FCC
- Facility ID: 41237
- ERP: DTS1: 1,000 kW; DTS2: 200 kW
- HAAT: DTS1: 607 m (1,991 ft); DTS2: 60 m (197 ft)
- Transmitter coordinates: DTS1: 35°39′7″N 114°18′43.8″W; DTS2: 36°7′44.8″N 115°11′28.4″W

Links
- Public license information: Public file; LMS
- Website: www.thespottv.com/vegas-34

KMCC (channel 34), branded as The Spot Vegas 34, is an independent television station licensed to Laughlin, Nevada, United States, serving the Las Vegas area. It is owned by the E. W. Scripps Company alongside ABC affiliate KTNV-TV (channel 13). The two stations share studios on South Valley View Boulevard in the nearby unincorporated community of Paradise (though with a Las Vegas mailing address). KMCC uses a distributed transmission system, with the main transmitter located near Dolan Springs, Arizona, and a secondary transmitter at the KTNV studios.

Channel 34 was originally intended to be built at Lake Havasu City, Arizona. However, the original permittee, Meridian Communications Company, had the channel reallocated to Laughlin in order to allow it to broadcast NBC programming, increase its service area, and overcome various technical restrictions. The station began broadcasting in August 2003 and was soon after sold to Cranston II LLC, which used it to broadcast Spanish-language programming from a series of services: TeleFórmula, Multimedios Televisión, Mega TV, VasalloVision, and MundoFox/MundoMax. Entravision Communications acquired KMCC in 2017 and switched its programming source to Azteca América.

Ion Media acquired KMCC in early 2020 and was in turn acquired by the E. W. Scripps Company. In 2023, Ion Television programming moved to a subchannel, and the station became a new English-language independent station under the name Vegas 34. This coincided with Scripps obtaining the broadcast rights to Vegas Golden Knights hockey, which aired on KMCC beginning in the 2023–24 season.

== History ==
On May 14, 1996, the Federal Communications Commission (FCC) issued a construction permit to Meridian Communications Company (later Mojave Broadcasting Company) for a full power television station on UHF channel 34 to serve Lake Havasu City, Arizona. Its original call sign was to be KAUE, adopted in February 1997, but changed to KMCC a month later.

In July 1996, while preparing to build the station, Mojave Broadcasting determined that the proposed transmitter location was inadequate for a full-power television operation and that the alternate site near Oatman, Arizona, could not provide city-grade service to Lake Havasu City due to terrain. In early 1999, the company requested to move the station and both the analog and digital allotments to Laughlin, Nevada, with the transmitter at the Oatman site. It later modified its proposal to specify a transmitter in Laughlin, allowing it to secure an affiliation with NBC, since the new location would not interfere with Las Vegas NBC station KVBC (channel 3, now KSNV); the children of James Rogers, chairman of KVBC owner Sunbelt Communications Company, owned Mojave Broadcasting, and Sunbelt had signed a time brokerage agreement with KMCC.

The FCC formally granted the request in June 2000, and Mojave Broadcasting began building the station in Laughlin. The FCC granted a construction permit for a digital companion channel, UHF 32, on January 15, 2002, and granted special temporary authority (STA) on April 6, 2004, to broadcast in digital at reduced power from the analog transmitter location.

The analog station signed on August 21, 2003, as a satellite of KVBC, and was granted a license on May 28, 2004. The arrangement was temporary, as before the station was licensed, Cranston II LLC had agreed to buy KMCC from Mojave Broadcasting. The sale was approved by the FCC in October 2004 and consummated in July 2005. Upon taking ownership, Cranston changed the station to Spanish-language programming from TeleFórmula, the cable news arm of Grupo Fórmula. In March 2006, equipment failure forced the station to reduce power significantly; in November, it switched to Multimedios Television.

KMCC had a construction permit to broadcast on UHF channel 32 from a transmitter location approximately 40 kilometers (25 mi) NNE of the analog transmitter location. The site, located near Dolan Springs, Arizona, was over 1,200 meters (3,937 ft) higher in elevation than the analog site, so while the analog station served the Mohave Valley from Bullhead City, Arizona, and Laughlin down to Needles, California, the digital station, when fully built and operational, would not only serve Laughlin and the Colorado River Valley, but most of central Mohave County, Arizona, and would reach beyond Las Vegas. As of October 2017, however, the station was broadcasting on STA from the analog site at 15 kW with coverage approximately that of the analog signal. Cranston filed a request to extend the STA until January 1, 2007.

Logo as MundoFox, 2012–2015

On January 26, 2009, KMCC switched to Mega TV, an independent television network based in Florida. The station again changed affiliations on January 1, 2010, affiliating with VasalloVision. KMCC then became an affiliate of MundoFox (later MundoMax) when it launched on August 13, 2012. In 2015, KMCC aired a music video format 24/7 called TheCoolTV on digital channels 32.2, 32.3 with some local programming. On December 1, 2016, with the demise of MundoMax, KMCC switched to Luken Communications' The Action Channel and Heartland networks.

Entravision Communications agreed to purchase KMCC for $2.75 million on March 1, 2017; the sale created a duopoly with Univision affiliate KINC. The sale was completed on January 17, 2018. In April 2018, KMCC became an Azteca América affiliate.

On January 27, 2020, it was announced that Ion Media would purchase KMCC from Entravision for an undisclosed price. The sale was completed on April 3. Because of this, in February 2020, Ion Plus replaced Azteca as the station's main affiliate. On September 24, 2020, the Cincinnati-based E. W. Scripps Company (owners of ABC affiliate KTNV-TV, channel 13) announced that it would purchase Ion Media for $2.65 billion, with financing from Berkshire Hathaway. Scripps then wound down Ion Plus and Qubo at the end of February 2021, and Ion Television became KMCC's main-channel programming source, and the station's technical operations were merged into those of KTNV.

Logo as Vegas 34, used from 2023 to 2025.

On May 4, 2023, the Vegas Golden Knights announced that KMCC, through the E. W. Scripps Company's Scripps Sports arm, would become the team's new television partner, replacing AT&T SportsNet Rocky Mountain after the latter's parent company, Warner Bros. Discovery, announced its intentions to exit the regional sports network business. Along with broadcasting all Golden Knights non-exclusive games over the air in partnership with a network of stations across the Golden Knights' broadcast territory, KMCC rebranded as Vegas 34 and became an independent station on August 14, 2023, with Ion programming moving to the station's second subchannel.

On March 1, 2025, KMCC rebranded as "The Spot Vegas 34". The branding originated on Scripps' KMCI-TV in Kansas City and was adopted by many of their independent stations. On March 13, Scripps Sports announced a deal with the WNBA's Las Vegas Aces which would move their games from KVVU to KMCC.

== Local programming ==
The station has carried all regional Vegas Golden Knights games since the 2023–24 NHL season and airs ancillary programming such as Knight Life. KMCC also simulcasts select programming from Scripps News and airs games from the Henderson Silver Knights, a minor league affiliate of the Golden Knights. It also carries ABC programming in lieu of KTNV when required for local breaking news and sports preemptions. Starting in the 2025 WNBA season, the station will also air regional Las Vegas Aces games along with a weekly program titled "In the Paint".

== Newscasts ==
As of September 2026, KMCC simulcasts Good Morning Las Vegas from KTNV-TV and airs a dedicated 10 p.m. newscast.

== Subchannels ==
Subchannels of KMCC
Subchannel	Res.	Short name	Programming
34.1	720p	Vegas34	Main KMCC programming
34.2	480i	ION	Ion
34.3	480i	CourtTV	Court TV
34.4	480i	BUSTED	Busted
34.5	480i	IONPlus	Ion Plus
34.6	480i	Bounce	Bounce TV
34.7	480i	GameSho	Game Show Central
34.8	480i	HSN	HSN
