= Vegas TV =

Vegas TV may refer to:

- KTUD-CD, a defunct independent television station
- Vegas (1978 TV series), a crime drama television series on ABC
- Vegas (2012 TV series), a period drama television series on CBS
- Las Vegas (TV series), a comedy-drama television series on NBC
