= KRLR =

KRLR may refer to:

- KRLR (FM), a radio station (89.1 FM) licensed to serve Sulphur, Louisiana, United States
- KHSV, a television station (channel 2, virtual 21) licensed to serve Las Vegas, Nevada, United States, which held the call sign KRLR from 1982 to 1995
