= KHSV =

Television station in Las Vegas

- Las Vegas, Nevada; United States
- Channels: Digital: 2 (VHF), to move to 23 (UHF); Virtual: 21

Programming
- Affiliations: see § Subchannels

Ownership
- Owner: Howard Stirk Holdings; (Channel 33, Inc.)

History
- First air date: July 31, 1984 (Note: Of KRLR on channel 21. The technical facility used by KHSV today traces its origins to KSNV.)
- Former call signs: KRLR (1984–1995); KUPN (1995–1998); KVWB (1998–2006); KVMY (2006–2016)
- Former channel number: Analog: 21 (UHF, 1984–2009)
- Former affiliations: Independent station (1984–1995); UPN (1995–1998); The WB (1998–2006); MyNetworkTV (2006–2014); Antenna TV (2014–2016 on 21.1, 2016–2024 on 21.4); Heroes & Icons (2016–2022, now on 21.2); MeTV (2022–2026)
- Call sign meaning: Howard Stirk Holdings (station owner); Las Vegas

Technical information
- Licensing authority: FCC
- Facility ID: 69677
- ERP: 27.7 kW; 1,000 kW (CP)
- HAAT: 386 m (1,266 ft)
- Transmitter coordinates: 36°0′31″N 115°0′20″W
- Translator(s): K26NP-D Overton

Links
- Public license information: Public file; LMS

KHSV (channel 21) is a television station in Las Vegas, Nevada, United States. The station is owned by Howard Stirk Holdings and broadcasts from Black Mountain, near Henderson.

Channel 21 went on the air as KRLR, the second independent station for Las Vegas, on July 31, 1984. Initially reliant on music videos, it broadened its mix of programming and sports soon after launch. KRLR became an affiliate of UPN at its launch in January 1995 and changed its call sign to KUPN. However, after Sinclair Broadcast Group acquired the station in 1997, poor relations between Sinclair and UPN led the company to change affiliations to The WB in 1998, with the station switching its call sign to KVWB shortly thereafter. Sinclair then began managing and later owning the former WB affiliate, KFBT (channel 33). Between 2003 and 2006, both stations aired local newscasts powered by the company's News Central.

In 2006, when The WB and UPN merged to form The CW, Sinclair first signed a group deal for the rival MyNetworkTV service for KVWB before acquiring the rights to The CW for KFBT. To reinforce its new network identity, KVWB again changed its call sign to KVMY.

Sinclair agreed in 2014 to acquire KSNV, the NBC affiliate, from the Intermountain West Communications Company. However, since Sinclair already owned two Las Vegas stations, it opted to merge the three stations onto the two licenses it already owned. In late 2014, Sinclair switched the technical facilities and licenses of KSNV and KVMY while absorbing the MyNetworkTV programming onto a subchannel of KVCW. The former KSNV license and facility, now under the KVMY call letters, was then sold to Howard Stirk Holdings and renamed KHSV.

== History ==
=== KRLR and KUPN ===
In 1980, the Federal Communications Commission (FCC) designated four applications for comparative hearing to determine who would be the first to build and operate a television station on the ultra high frequency (UHF) band in Las Vegas. The applications came from DRES Media of Las Vegas, led by the Scott and Foremaster families; Alden Communications, a California firm which also filed for channels in Seattle and Portland, Oregon; Broadcast West Inc., based in North Las Vegas; and Channel 21 Corporation, whose principals were two New Jersey businessmen. Three of the applications had been filed in 1978, anticipating a possible boom in subscription television broadcasting.

Under DRES Media ownership, the station began broadcasting on July 31, 1984, as KRLR. It originally broadcast as "Vusic 21", devoting most of its time to music videos; KRLR management boasted that theirs was the first 24-hour music video station in the country, though the format was also an aid to getting the station on the air in short order. Over the course of the next year, the independent station transformed its schedule into a broader mix of entertainment programming by acquiring movies and syndicated programs. The first notable exception to the music video format came months after signing on, when the station signed for rights to air telecasts of Las Vegas Americans indoor soccer. Sports played a key role in the station's schedule in the late 1980s; channel 21 broadcast a partial-season package of UNLV Runnin' Rebels basketball and selected UNLV football games, and it was also a heavy baseball broadcaster, featuring the San Diego Padres and Oakland Athletics on its schedule.

Dennis Todd, a subcontractor for KRLR, was working on the station's Black Mountain tower on May 4, 1988, when the nearby Pacific Engineering and Production Company facility exploded. Todd was known to tape some of his work and had a video camera with him while on the tower. After the first blast, he began recording the unfolding disaster; he was flown with his camera to NBC in Burbank, California, from which his footage was fed to NBC affiliates nationwide.

As the first Las Vegas station on the UHF band, KRLR's promotion in tuning and antennas forged a path for two stations that followed it in the decade: KBLR-TV (channel 39) and KFBT (channel 33). However, in the ratings, it was a distant second to KVVU, one of the nation's strongest independent outlets.

In 1993, DRES Media filed to sell KRLR to Las Vegas Channel 21 Inc., a company owned by Michael J. Lambert, for $4.875 million. The new ownership affiliated channel 21 with the new United Paramount Network (UPN) at its launch on January 16, 1995, and changed its call letters to KUPN on March 6 of that year. Lambert more than recouped his investment by selling KUPN to Sinclair Broadcast Group for $87 million in 1997; the transaction represented the company's entry to a market where TV revenues had doubled within four years.

=== KVWB and KVMY ===
The purchase of KUPN came months before Sinclair's relationship with UPN frosted over. On July 21, 1997, Sinclair signed a long-term affiliation agreement with The WB, under which the group committed five of its UPN-affiliated stations to that network in 1998, with a sixth independent station to join in 1999. The high-profile move by Sinclair to move five stations from UPN to its direct competitor led to a legal dispute between the companies. UPN sued Sinclair, alleging it had breached its affiliation contract by exiting it early. On January 14, 1998, Sinclair announced that KUPN would join The WB, taking the affiliation from KFBT, in a switch later postponed to March 1; KFBT did not pick up UPN, making it an independent station, and a month later, Sinclair struck a deal to operate KFBT under a local marketing agreement. Channel 21's call letters remained KUPN until changing to KVWB on May 27, 1998.

The affiliation switch was beneficial for the station's ratings; in prime time, it saw a 150-percent increase between November 1997 and November 1998. In January 1999, Sinclair hired a news director with plans to debut an hour-long 10 p.m. newscast, the second in the market, for the fall television season; its launch was to be contingent on the station moving into new, 30,000-square-foot (2,800 m^{2}) studios to be built in Summerlin. The station instead programmed reruns of Star Trek: Voyager in the hour. In November 1999, KVWB tied KVVU in sign-on to sign-off ratings for the first time in history.

On October 13, 2003, Sinclair debuted local News Central hybrid newscasts for KVWB (at 10 p.m.) and KFBT (at 7 p.m.). As with others of its type, the newscasts combined local news coverage read by anchors in Las Vegas with national news and weather from Sinclair's corporate headquarters in Hunt Valley, Maryland. News Central wound down in March 2006; the KVWB newscast ceased on March 3 and was soon after replaced with one produced by NBC affiliate KVBC.

In 2006, The WB and UPN were shut down and replaced with The CW, which offered programming from both predecessor networks. However, Sinclair was late to sign an agreement with The CW. The news of the merger resulted in Sinclair announcing, two months later, that most of its UPN and WB affiliates, including KVWB, would join MyNetworkTV, a new service formed by the News Corporation, which was also owner of the Fox network. It was not until May 2 that an agreement was signed for KFBT and several other Sinclair-owned stations to join The CW. To reinforce their new affiliations, KVWB and KFBT became KVMY and KVCW in June 2006, relaunching as "My LV TV" and "The CW Las Vegas" when the new networks debuted in September.

On May 15, 2012, Sinclair and Fox agreed to a five-year affiliation agreement extension for the station group's 19 Fox-affiliated stations until 2017. This included an option, that was exercisable between July 1, 2012, and March 31, 2013, for Fox parent News Corporation to buy a combination of six Sinclair-owned stations (two CW/MyNetworkTV duopolies and two standalone MyNetworkTV affiliates) in three out of four markets; KVMY and KVCW were included in the Fox purchase option, along with stations in Cincinnati (WSTR-TV); Raleigh, North Carolina (WLFL/WRDC); and Norfolk, Virginia (WTVZ). In January 2013, Fox announced that it would not exercise its option to buy any of the Sinclair stations.

=== 2014 license swap and sale to Howard Stirk Holdings ===
On September 3, 2014, Intermountain West Communications Company announced that it would sell KSNV-DT, Las Vegas's NBC affiliate, to Sinclair for $120 million. As Sinclair already owned a duopoly in Las Vegas, it could not add a third license, the company planned to sell the license assets (though not the programming) of one of the three stations to comply with FCC ownership restrictions, with the divested station's programming being moved to the other stations. On November 1, 2014, Sinclair began the process of realigning KSNV, KVCW, and KVMY. It moved the MyNetworkTV programming to a subchannel of KVCW and relocated KSNV's call letters, programming, and channel number to what had been KVMY. The KSNV technical facility then became KVMY, retaining virtual channel 21 but not the MyNetworkTV programming, and was sold to Howard Stirk Holdings, a company owned by conservative commentator Armstrong Williams. The $150,000 purchase price primarily consisted of the transmission facility. The call sign on channel 21 changed to KHSV on March 7, 2016.

== Technical information ==
=== Subchannels ===
KHSV-TV broadcasts from Black Mountain, near Henderson. The station's signal is multiplexed:

Subchannels of KHSV
Subchannel	Res.	Short name	Programming
21.1	720p	NTDwest	NTD TV
21.2	480i	H & I	H&I
21.3	480i	START	Start TV
21.4	480i	greatTV	Great
21.5	480i	CATCHY	Catchy Comedy
21.6	480i	QVC	QVC
21.7	480i	DABL	Dabl

=== Analog-to-digital conversion ===
The present channel 2 digital technical facility was built by KSNV, then KVBC, and activated on October 22, 2002.

Pre-swap KVMY shut down its analog signal, over UHF channel 21, on February 17, 2009, the original target date on which full-power television stations in the United States were to transition from analog to digital broadcasts under federal mandate; pre-swap KVBC did not follow suit on that date. The station's digital signal remained on its pre-transition UHF channel 22; similarly, when KVBC shut down, its signal continued on channel 2 prior to the 2014 swap.
