= Paula Francis =

American journalist (born 1952)

- Born: March 12, 1952 (age 74); Queens, New York City, New York, U.S.
- Education: University of Wisconsin–Madison
- Occupation: Journalist
- Television: KTNV-TV (1985–1990); KLAS-TV (1990–2016)

Paula Francis (born March 12, 1952) is an American journalist.

== Life ==
Francis was born in Queens, New York City, New York. Paula's TV news career started in Madison, Wisconsin and later moved to Las Vegas in 1985 where she started at KTNV-TV as the evening anchor until she joined KLAS-TV in 1990 as the evening anchor alongside Gary Waddell. Paula has won eight Las Vegas Review-Journal Best of Las Vegas awards and several humanitarian awards for her involvement in the community.

She has appeared in over a dozen episodes as herself as the news anchor in CSI: Crime Scene Investigation.

Francis retired from anchoring on April 1, 2016.
