= Sue Manteris =

American journalist (born 1962)

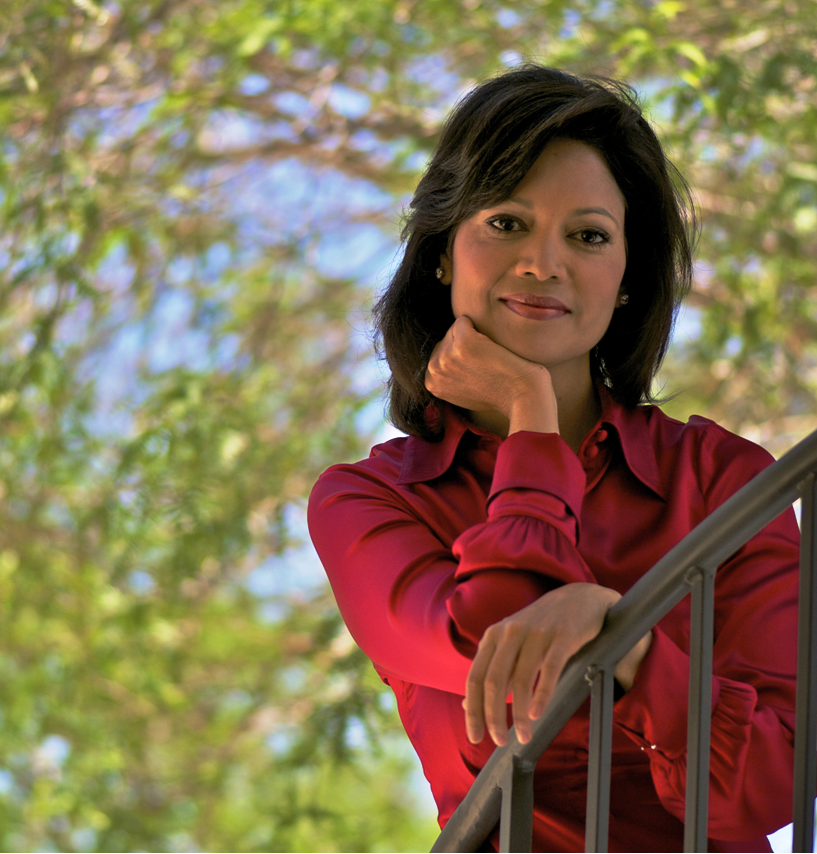
- Manteris in 2011
- Born: Sunanda Tripathi; June 20, 1962 (age 64); Varanasi, India
- Education: Columbine High School; Colorado State University Pueblo
- Occupations: Account executive and former journalist
- Years active: 1984–present
- Employer: 10e Media (2011–present)
- Television: KVBC-TV/KSNV-DT (1989–2011)
- Spouse: Arthur Manteris (?–present)
- Children: 1 (with Manteris); 3 grandchildren (1 deceased)

Sunanda Tripathi-Manteris (born June 20, 1962) is an Indian-born American account executive and former journalist at the NBC affiliate in Las Vegas, Nevada, KSNV-DT.

Manteris was raised in Littleton, Colorado, a suburb of Denver, where she attended Columbine High School. She went on to receive a Bachelor of Arts degree in mass communications in 1985 from Colorado State University Pueblo.

In 1984, she began her broadcasting career as a disc jockey at KDZA and Z-100 in Southern Colorado, including a transfer to the News Department where she did “morning drive” newscasts. She began working in television in 1985 as a reporter and weekend anchor at KCWY-TV in Casper, Wyoming. She later moved to work in TV news positions at KULR-TV in Billings, Montana and WWAY-TV in Wilmington, North Carolina. Manteris moved to Las Vegas in early 1989 when she joined NBC affiliate KVBC-TV (now KSNV-DT), as a news anchor. She continued this position for 22 years until June 10, 2011, when her contract expired.

As a result of allegations of ethnic, gender and age discrimination, a Federal lawsuit was filed in U.S. District Court in Nevada on May 17, 2011, on her behalf. On April 2, 2012, Judge Gloria Navarro put the lawsuit on hold and ordered Manteris to resolve the lawsuit against the station through arbitration.The arbitration resulted in the station offering a settlement, which was accepted by Manteris. Both sides agreed to a non-disclosure agreement regarding the amount and terms of the settlement.

She was honored as a finalist for Emmy Award for “Hooked on Hookah.” Manteris is a founding member and currently an officer in “Las Vegas-India Chamber of Commerce” and member of “Friends of India.” Manteris is married and has one son; she lives in Boulder City, Nevada.

Manteris is a supporter of the Leukemia & Lymphoma Society of Southern Nevada. Her 12-year-old grandson died in March 2018 from acute myeloid leukemia.

== Awards and nominations ==
- 2010, nominated for Pacific Southwest Regional Emmy Award for her work at KSNV

== Personal life ==
Tripathi-Manteris is married to Arthur Manteris, author and former Vice President of Station Casinos.
