= News Central (American TV program) =

Television news format created by Sinclair Broadcast Group

- Genre: News
- Directed by: Joe DeFeo
- Presented by: Morris Jones; (National anchor); Vytas Reid; (Chief meteorologist)
- Theme music composer: Stephen Arnold Music
- Country of origin: United States

Production
- Production location: Hunt Valley, Maryland
- Running time: 23 minutes
- Production company: Sinclair Broadcast Group

Original release
- Network: Sinclair Broadcast Group stations
- Release: October 28, 2002 – March 31, 2006

Related
- The National Desk

News Central is an American series of primetime newscast television programs on television stations owned by the Sinclair Broadcast Group. The programs mixed locally produced news with nationally produced news and an opinion segment from Sinclair's Hunt Valley, Maryland studios, along with weather segments customized for each market also originating from Hunt Valley. News Central was broadcast between October 2002 and March 2006.

== History ==
News Central was launched on October 28, 2002, with WSMH's News At Ten. The format was original announced to be rolled out to Sinclair stations currently not offering news. But after a successful trial run at WSMH, Sinclair announced that three stations with newscasts would be next in converting to the format during the first quarter of 2003. By April 2003, News Central was planning to launch its own Washington bureau. By December 2003, 12 Sinclair stations were using the News Central format.

News Central ended all newscasts effective March 31, 2006; after that date, its stations either returned to a more traditional in-house newscast format, outsourced their newscast to a larger station in the market, or cancelled their newscasts entirely. Others, like WSMH, teamed up with non-affiliate stations in their market to either simulcast other stations' newscasts or jointly produce a news program. WYZZ and WUHF went into LMAs with other stations in their markets.

Sinclair later revisited the concept of a centralized news operation with The National Desk, a national news program that features contributions and reports from Sinclair's local stations.

== Content ==
The local station news operation provided the first ten minutes of news. Then national News Central operation produced 12 minutes of international and national news of the total newscast, along with customized local weather forecasts produced from the national operation, and with other content such as stories prepared by the publicity departments of that station's network as a video news release (for instance, WVTV would carry a feature on Gilmore Girls or One Tree Hill produced by The WB as a tie-in to that evening's episodes). The national operation also provided nightly The Point commentary by Mark E. Hyman, Sinclair's Vice President of Corporate Relations. News Central additionally subscribed to AccuWeather and CNN Newsource to provide wire service video and additional context for national stories.

== Carriage ==
- WSMH, Flint, Michigan (October 28, 2002 – March 31, 2006)
- KOKH, Oklahoma City (Q1 2003–March 31, 2006)
- WLFL, Raleigh, North Carolina (Q1 2003– March 31, 2006)
- WUHF, Rochester, New York (Q1 2003– March 31, 2006)
- WPGH, Pittsburgh, Pennsylvania (2003–March 31, 2006)
- WVTV, Milwaukee, Wisconsin (August 2003–March 31, 2006)
- WNYO Buffalo, New York (August 16, 2004 – March 31, 2006)
- WTTA, Tampa, Florida (August 25, 2003–March 31, 2006)
- KFBT, KVWB, Las Vegas, Nevada (2003–March 31, 2006)
- WUPN, WXLV Greensboro, North Carolina (2003–March 31, 2006)
- WBFF, Baltimore, Maryland (February 2003 – March 31, 2006)
- WSTR-TV, Cincinnati (December 2003 – February 24, 2006)

== See also ==
- The National Desk, Sinclair's current national newscast effort
