= KTNV-TV =

Television station in Las Vegas

- Las Vegas, Nevada; United States
- Channels: Digital: 26 (UHF); Virtual: 13
- Branding: Channel 13

Programming
- Affiliations: 13.1: ABC; for others, see § Subchannels

Ownership
- Owner: E. W. Scripps Company; (Scripps Broadcasting Holdings LLC)
- Sister stations: KMCC

History
- First air date: May 4, 1956
- Former call signs: KSHO-TV (1956–1980); KTNV-TV (1980–1988); KTNV (1988–2009)
- Former channel numbers: Analog: 13 (VHF, 1956–2009); Digital: 12 (VHF, 2002–2009), 13 (VHF, 2009–2026)
- Former affiliations: Independent (1956–1957)
- Call sign meaning: "Television Nevada"

Technical information
- Licensing authority: FCC
- Facility ID: 74100
- ERP: 1,000 kW
- HAAT: 606 m (1,988 ft)
- Transmitter coordinates: 35°56′44.7″N 115°2′37.6″W

Links
- Public license information: Public file; LMS
- Website: www.ktnv.com

KTNV-TV (channel 13) is a television station in Las Vegas, Nevada, United States, affiliated with ABC. It is owned by the E. W. Scripps Company alongside Laughlin-licensed KMCC (channel 34), an independent station. The two stations share studios on South Valley View Boulevard in the nearby unincorporated community of Paradise (though with a Las Vegas mailing address); KTNV-TV's transmitter is located atop Mount Arden in Henderson.

Channel 13 was the third station to be activated in Southern Nevada, beginning broadcasting in May 1956 as KSHO-TV. The station originally operated on a 24-hour basis, unique for the time, with a rotating schedule of movies and minimal news coverage; it remained an independent station until affiliating with ABC in December 1957. Amid financial difficulties, multiple stock sales and ownership transfers occurred from 1957 until 1961, when the licensee, Television Company of America, declared bankruptcy, and a receiver was appointed. In 1963, the Federal Communications Commission opened an investigation into an unauthorized transfer of control of the station, which resulted in a decision to deny renewal of its broadcast license. KSHO-TV continued to operate on an interim basis while seven applicants fought for the permanent license; Talmac, Inc., owned the station from then until 1972, followed by Arthur Powell Williams.

The Journal Company acquired KSHO-TV in 1979 and relaunched it as KTNV-TV in March 1980. Journal made technical investments at the station, and the news department also grew, but KTNV-TV has not been able to substantially rise from third place in the market despite several overhauls and tweaks to the station's newscasts. Scripps acquired Journal, including KTNV, in 2015.

== History ==
Channel 13 in Las Vegas was first applied for in 1951 by the Desert Television Company, a consortium of local businessmen associated with local radio station KRAM, which was in turn sold to Huntridge Theaters in 1952. Another application was filed by the Western Television Company, but while Western withdrew its application in February 1954 and left Desert Television unopposed, a Federal Communications Commission (FCC) hearing examiner denied the application because the group failed to prove its financial qualifications.

=== Early years ===
On September 28, 1955, Moritz Zenoff, owner of radio station KBMI in nearby Henderson as well as the Boulder City News and Henderson Home News, was granted a construction permit to build channel 13 in Las Vegas. Zenoff built the station and signed on KSHO-TV on May 4, 1956. It was an independent station with a 24-hour schedule—possibly the only one at that time—consisting of four rotating six-hour movie blocks, interrupted in the evening for brief five-minute news breaks that were the station's only local programming. The studios were located in the Fremont Hotel and Casino, from which the station broadcast with a mere 250 watts of power; low-budget advertisements were a major draw, as was a classified advertising feature aired throughout the day. KSHO-TV was built for $70,000, a fraction of the cost of most new-build TV stations, and run by just two technical employees per shift, but its low-cost programming made the small operation profitable.

Zenoff sold the station and KBMI radio to the Television Company of America (TCA) in September 1956, four months after putting it on the air. TCA was owned by a number of TV and radio investors in the western United States, including Albert Zugsmith. It was the second attempt to sell the station that year after a previous application to sell the outlet to Wilbur Clark, developer and owner of the Desert Inn, was withdrawn. Stock in Television Company of America changed hands multiple times in the late 1950s. In March 1957, Morton Sidley and Ira Laufer, both radio executives in Los Angeles, bought stock in TCA, as did Nathan and Merv Adelson and Irwin Molasky.

That fall, the station relocated to El Rancho Vegas and applied to increase its power, and on December 15, it became an ABC affiliate, the 81st primary outlet of the network nationally. However, financial trouble and continued ownership turnover remained as hallmarks. In February 1959, the sale of the station to Rube Jolley, the founder of KLAS-TV, was announced. The FCC granted the $137,500 purchase of TCA stock by Jolley's company, the Nevada Broadcasters Fund, in November. Jolley was president but did not own any of the stock; among the notable stockholders was Howard D. Johnson, owner of radio and television interests in Idaho and Utah. The Television Company of America, meanwhile, had to obtain a court order to prevent it from being evicted from El Rancho Vegas.

=== License revocation and re-award ===
Television Company of America filed for bankruptcy protection in May 1961, and it asked for permission to transfer the license to a court-appointed receiver. However, in March 1963, the FCC instead designated its license renewal as well as a proposed transfer of the license to Arthur Powell Williams, a businessman from Los Angeles, for hearing. The commission ordered the hearings over complications in ownership. The FCC alleged that, over two years of what Variety called "financial gamesmanship", ownership had passed from Television Company of America to Nevada Broadcasters' Fund to a company controlled by Johnson, who advanced funds to keep the station in business; that there was an unauthorized contract for a transfer of control to Johnson; and that Nevada Broadcasters' Fund had disclosed in stock sales that it acquired control of KSHO-TV before even filing the application with the FCC, which must approve all transfers of control of radio and television stations. Hearings were held in Las Vegas before an FCC examiner over the various unauthorized transfers and attempts to solicit public investment. KSHO-TV's weakened position also was revealed by testimony in a concurrent FCC battle over the licensing of channel 4 in Boulder City, wherein applicants for that station—including KSHO-TV's station manager—were found to have discussed how to seek a network affiliation and "what part Channel 13 would play if it became dead".

FCC hearing examiner Millard French handed down an initial decision in November 1964 against the license renewal and proposed transfers of control to Williams, citing Nevada Broadcasters' Fund's "misrepresentations and statements that were calculated to deceive", that stakeholders were selling stock they no longer owned, and that Johnson's company, KBLI Inc., attempted to raise stock only to be told by the securities commissioner in Idaho that it could not invest any of the money it raised outside the state. In July 1965, the FCC ruled against Television Company of America. It represented the first time the commission had denied renewal of a television license at hearing; even though the FCC held that some innocent creditors and others would be punished, it rebuked the "most incredibly lax manner" in which KSHO-TV was operated and noted that concealing the Johnson ownership interest was "outstanding and willful".

Arthur Powell Williams lodged an appeal, noting that the commission found him to be of "blameless character". However, a federal appeals court upheld the commission's action in June 1966, and the Supreme Court refused to take up the case in February 1967.

=== Talmac and Williams ownership ===
On June 9, 1967, KSHO-TV's operating authority expired; the same day, the FCC granted interim operating authority to a group consisting of five of the seven applicants seeking to operate the station on a permanent basis. Channel 13 of Las Vegas, Inc., consisted of five of the groups: Williams, Desert Broadcasting Corporation, Ettlinger Broadcasting, Clark County Communications, and Talmac, Inc. The other two, not part of the interim operator, were Lotus Television of Las Vegas and Diller Broadcasting Corporation, owned by Phyllis Diller.

The application of Talmac, Inc., attracted the most immediate attention because it had ripple effects in Carson City. Alan Abner, one of Talmac's principals, sat on the Nevada Gaming Control Board, and conflict-of-interest questions prompted him to tender his resignation. Two gamblers—whose business Abner regulated on the Gaming Control Board—were stakeholders in competing applicant Clark County Communications, thus the issue. Even during the interim operation period, KSHO-TV moved into its present Valley View Drive studios in 1968 and simultaneously began high-power broadcasting for the first time in its history.

The seven applicants reached a settlement in April 1969, with Talmac being named the winner of permanent authority to operate KSHO-TV and some of Ettlinger Broadcasting's principals buying stakes in Talmac. Arthur Powell Williams—the same man who was to have bought the station a decade earlier—filed to acquire KSHO-TV from Talmac in April 1971, a transaction approved by the FCC in January 1972.

=== Journal and Scripps ownership ===
In 1979, The Journal Company purchased KSHO-TV from Williams, adding its first television station outside of its home state of Wisconsin. The move came at a time when The Journal Company wanted to diversify in order to relieve antitrust pressures on its Milwaukee combination of the Milwaukee Journal, WTMJ-TV, AM and FM. A total overhaul was necessary at channel 13, which had become the fourth-rated station locally even though it was affiliated with ABC, then the top network nationally. The general manager of KLAS-TV noted that the syndicated early evening offerings of independent KVVU-TV had provided stiffer competition for their newscasts than KSHO-TV's news offerings. The result was a total image overhaul, including new KTNV-TV call letters on March 2, 1980. Journal also invested in new live mobile reporting equipment and moved the transmitter to Black Mountain; in 1985, KTNV was the first Las Vegas-area station to broadcast in stereo.

On July 30, 2014, it was announced that the E. W. Scripps Company would buy Journal Communications in an all-stock transaction. Scripps would retain the two companies' broadcast properties, including KTNV, and spin off its print properties as part of Journal Media Group. The FCC approved the deal on December 12, 2014. It was approved by shareholders on March 11, 2015. The merger was completed on April 1, 2015.

Scripps acquired Ion Media and most of its stations, including KMCC (channel 34) in the Las Vegas market, in 2020. As part of its acquisition of broadcast rights to local Vegas Golden Knights hockey games, Scripps announced on May 4, 2023, that Ion programming would relocate and KMCC would become an independent station featuring the Golden Knights and newscasts from KTNV.

== Local programming ==
=== News operation ===
As KSHO-TV, the station aired local news programming, though it rarely found much ratings success. When Journal took over, the main early evening newscast was moved from 6 to 5:30 p.m. to avoid direct competition with KLAS-TV, which commanded half of all TV viewership at the 6 p.m. hour in February 1980. The station was lifted into second place for a time but had sunk back down to third by 1989; in the Las Vegas Review-Journal, Ken White described the newsroom as having "more news directors hired and fired the last few years than managers for the New York Yankees". In 1989, the station launched its first morning newscast, Good Morning Las Vegas.

Much of the station's history in news has been spent making attempts to improve the ratings and move the station up from third place. In 1992, the station rebranded its newscasts as News 13: Inside Las Vegas, including an image overhaul. Another shakeup was made in late 2001, two years before the Action News brand was instituted.

In 2014, Journal was fined $115,000 by the FCC for airing so-called "special reports" about liquidations at car dealerships that were actually commercials for the dealerships, failing to disclose that they were paid advertisements. This was the second ethics problem for the KTNV newsroom within five years. In 2009, reporter Nina Radetich was recorded telling the owner of an automotive repair business that her boyfriend's public relations company could help counter the negative press being generated by KTNV's own reporting.

=== Morning Blend ===
In 2010, following the lead of several other Journal stations, KTNV launched a lifestyle-oriented program, The Morning Blend, on July 6, 2010. The program, produced by KTNV's creative services department, features advertorial segments.

=== Notable former on-air staff ===
- Ross Becker – anchor, 2002–2004
- Paula Francis – anchor (known as Paula Dilworth at KTNV)
- Dave Malkoff – reporter
- Cecily Tynan – meteorologist

== Technical information ==
=== Subchannels ===
KTNV-TV's transmitter is located atop Mount Arden in Henderson. Its signal is multiplexed:

Subchannels of KTNV-TV
Subchannel	Res.	Short name	Programming
13.1	720p	KTNV-HD	ABC
13.2	480i	LAFF	Laff
13.3	480i	GRIT	Grit
13.4	480i	HSN	HSN (4:3)
13.5	480i	ShopLC	Shop LC (4:3)
33.1	1080i	TheCWLV	The CW (KVCW)

Broadcast on behalf of another station

KTNV-TV is a participating station in Las Vegas's ATSC 3.0 (NextGen TV) deployment on KVCW and in turn hosts that station's main subchannel in 1.0 format.

=== Analog-to-digital conversion ===
KTNV-TV shut down its analog signal, over VHF channel 13, on June 12, 2009, the official date on which full-power television stations in the United States transitioned from analog to digital broadcasts under federal mandate. The station's digital signal relocated from its pre-transition VHF channel 12 to channel 13 for post-transition operations. In 2021, Scripps filed to move KTNV-TV from the VHF band on channel 13 to the UHF band on channel 26.

=== Translators ===
KTNV-TV's signal is additionally rebroadcast over the following translators:

- Caliente: K13NV-D
- Laughlin: K20NW-D
- Overton: K30MH-D
- Pahrump: K31OY-D, K36BQ-D
- Panaca: K04HF-D
- Pioche: K11IV-D
- Ursine: K13LU-D
