= KLAS-TV =

Television station in Las Vegas

- Las Vegas, Nevada; United States
- Channels: Digital: 7 (VHF); Virtual: 8
- Branding: Channel 8; 8 News Now

Programming
- Affiliations: 8.1: CBS; for others, see § Subchannels

Ownership
- Owner: Nexstar Media Group; (Nexstar Media Inc.)

History
- First air date: July 8, 1953
- Former channel numbers: Analog: 8 (VHF, 1953–2009)
- Former affiliations: ABC (secondary, 1953–1957)
- Call sign meaning: Las Vegas (also the ICAO code for Harry Reid International Airport)

Technical information
- Licensing authority: FCC
- Facility ID: 35042
- ERP: 30.1 kW
- HAAT: 609.1 m (1,998 ft)
- Transmitter coordinates: 35°56′45.1″N 115°2′38.3″W

Links
- Public license information: Public file; LMS
- Website: www.8newsnow.com

KLAS-TV (channel 8) is a television station in Las Vegas, Nevada, United States, affiliated with CBS and owned by Nexstar Media Group. The station's studios are located on Channel 8 Drive near the northern portion of the Las Vegas Strip in the unincorporated community of Winchester (though with a Las Vegas mailing address), and its transmitter is located on Mount Arden in Henderson.

== History ==
=== Early years ===
KLAS-TV initially broadcast a test pattern for two weeks, beginning on July 8, 1953. The station went on-air on the evening of July 22, 1953, becoming Nevada's first television station. The station was originally owned by Las Vegas Television Inc., run by Hank Greenspun, owner of the Las Vegas Sun. KLAS has always been a CBS affiliate, but maintained a secondary affiliation with ABC, which it would share with KLRJ/KORK-TV (channel 3, now KSNV-DT) from that station's sign on in January 1955, until KSHO-TV (channel 13, now KTNV-TV) affiliated with the network in December 1957.

Billionaire and aviation magnate Howard Hughes enjoyed staying up late and watching television, and he wanted KLAS to broadcast a full 24-hour/7-day-a-week schedule. Hughes also requested the station to show more Westerns and films about aviation. He eventually decided to purchase the station so he could have it operate as he wanted (though under his ownership, continuing to run CBS programming as scheduled and expected if preempted, most of the time). Greenspun sold the station to Hughes Tool Company on March 30, 1968. After Hughes' death in 1976, the station was held in an outside trust for another two years until 1978, when it was sold to Landmark Communications (Landmark Communications renamed itself to Landmark Media Enterprises in September 2008).

=== Since 1996 ===
On April 16, 1996, KLAS-TV became the first commercial television station in Nevada (and one of the first in the United States) to carry a digital broadcast signal. This signal was first launched during the National Association of Broadcasters annual convention that year. On April 6, 2000, the first scheduled high definition network broadcasts in Las Vegas began on KLAS-TV's digital signal.

On January 30, 2008, Landmark announced its intention to sell KLAS, along with its other television station WTVF in Nashville. No suitable buyer for KLAS was found until Landmark took most of its properties off the market in October 2008 due to the 2008 financial crisis. KLAS and WTVF remained under Landmark ownership for more than four years.

On September 4, 2012, Journal Broadcast Group (owners of one of KLAS-TV's local rivals, ABC affiliate KTNV-TV) announced that it would purchase WTVF for $215 million. The sale was finalized on December 6. This left KLAS-TV as the only television station in Landmark's portfolio.

On November 21, 2014, Nexstar Broadcasting Group announced that it would purchase KLAS for $145 million. The sale was completed on February 13, 2015.

On January 29, 2016, shortly prior to Super Bowl 50, KLAS was dropped from Cox Communications due to a retransmission consent dispute with Nexstar across nine markets. As a contingency plan, Cox announced on February 3, 2016, that it would offer a free preview of ESPN Deportes (which was broadcasting the game in Spanish) over the Super Bowl weekend, and encouraged viewers to listen to the English radio broadcast along with it. The next day, KLAS was restored after Cox reached a new deal with Nexstar.

== Programming ==
=== Sports programming ===
In 2020, Nexstar and KLAS were named the official television partners of the NFL's Las Vegas Raiders. Along with carrying the bulk of the team's games as part of the NFL on CBS, KLAS carries preseason games and team-produced ancillary programming (such as The Silver & Black Show). By virtue of CBS holding the rights to the game, KLAS was the local broadcaster of Super Bowl LVIII at Allegiant Stadium.

=== News operation ===
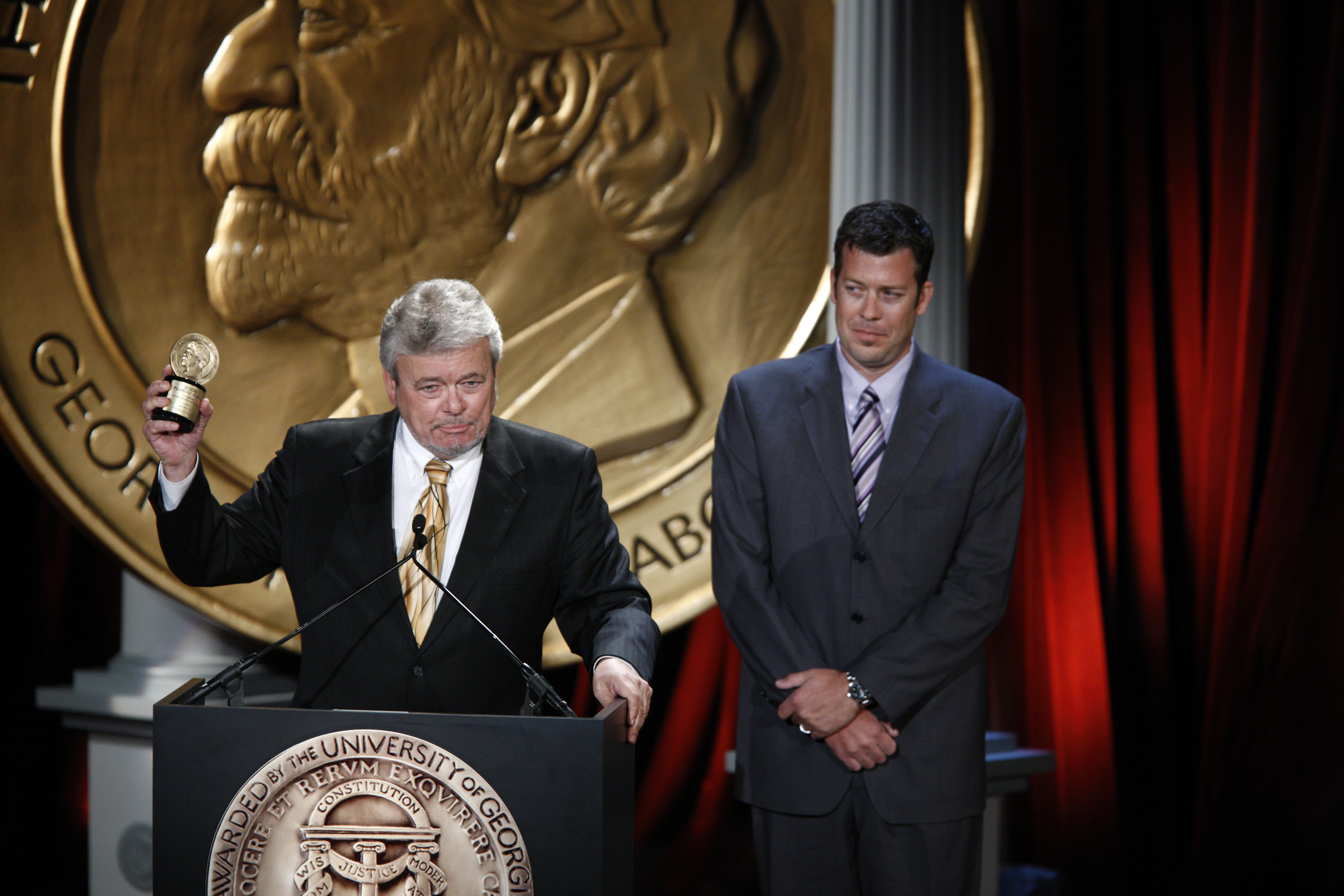
George Knapp and Matt Adams of KLAS-TV at the 68th Annual Peabody Awards

KLAS-TV presently broadcasts 38 hours of locally produced newscasts each week (with 6 1/2 hours each weekday, two hours on Saturdays and 3 1/2 hours on Sundays); in addition, the station formerly produced an additional five hours of local newscasts for its second subchannel (with one hour each weekday). Although channel 8 does not produce a Saturday edition of its morning newscast, 8 News Now: Good Day, the station does produce a newscast which airs for 3 hours weekday mornings from 4 to 7 a.m. and on Sunday mornings for an hour at 5:30 a.m. and a half-hour at 8 a.m., since channel 8 airs CBS Saturday Morning. The evening news runs at 4 p.m., 5 p.m., 6 p.m. and 11 p.m.

KLAS previously branded its newscasts as Eyewitness News, taking over the name from 1982 after KVBC discontinued using the branding, and used it until late 2009, when its newscasts adopted the 8 News Now title from KOLO-TV in Reno. In the early 1980s, the station's newscasts were branded as Newscenter 8, and used the opening Phenix Horns music of Earth, Wind & Fire's 1979 single "In the Stone" for two years. On September 21, 1981, KLAS-TV became the first station in the state of Nevada to provide hour-long newscasts. For years, KLAS produced a daily interview show, which aired on sister channel Las Vegas One; the program moved to NBC affiliate KVBC (channel 3, now KSNV) in January 2010.

Beginning in the fall of 2002, KLAS produced a 10 p.m. newscast for KTUD-CA called Eyewitness News at 10 on UPN. In the fall of 2006, when KTUD became an independent station, that station was rebranded on-air as "Vegas TV" and the newscasts was renamed to suit the new identity. Shortly after the merger, however, the station dropped the 10 p.m. newscast. KTUD later revived its 10 p.m. newscast, this time produced by KSNV, from October 2009 to August 2010.

In March 2006, KLAS revamped the station's morning newscast, which was branded as Eyewitness News This Morning at the time.

On September 17, 2006, KLAS became the first station in the Las Vegas market and the state of Nevada, and the eleventh station in the United States, to begin broadcasting its local newscasts in high definition.

Just after Nexstar purchased the station, it was announced that Nexstar might discontinue the 4 a.m. and 4:30 a.m. half-hours of the station's weekday morning newscast. Starting on February 25, 2015, Nexstar would lay off at least 18 of the station's employees, mainly in the news department's business and traffic divisions; some jobs related to the station's Internet operations were also removed as the station's web operations moved onto Nexstar's Lakana platform. The station's news helicopter was also discontinued.

On October 10, 2018, channel 8 began producing an hour-long weeknight 9 p.m. newscast for its second digital subchannel, making it the only television station in Las Vegas to air a local newscast in that timeslot. The newscast was later canceled.

==== Awards ====
KLAS has won more than 100 awards for its news coverage, including investigative documentaries about the American Mafia and UFOs. In 1986, United Press International awarded it "Best Newscast in America". As of 1992, it frequently dominated ratings in local newscasts. In 2011, KLAS received 19 nominations from the National Academy of Television Arts and Sciences, eclipsing its rival news stations.

==== Notable news staff ====
- Paula Francis
- George Knapp
- Sue Lowden

== Technical information ==
=== Subchannels ===
The station's signal is multiplexed:

Subchannels of KLAS-TV
Subchannel	Res.	Short name	Programming
8.1	1080i	CBS	CBS
8.2	480i	Antenna	Antenna TV
8.3	480i	Rewind TV	Rewind TV
8.4	480i	Shop LC	Shop LC
33.3	480i	ESTRELL	Estrella TV (KVCW)
33.4	480i	ThisTV	The Nest (KVCW)
33.5	480i	Nest	The Nest (KVCW)

Broadcast on behalf of another station

In 2010, KLAS launched a second subchannel affiliated with MeTV. As of June 2013, the station launched another subchannel, this time with Movies!. Ion Television began airing on 8.4 in 2017 and was replaced by Circle in April 2021 and Rewind TV on November 1, 2021. In January 2022, Movies! was replaced by SportsGrid. On June 1 of that year, MeTV moved to KHSV resulting in Rewind TV moving to 8.2, and Shop LC took its place on 8.4. In October 2022, SportsGrid was replaced by Get. On May 1, 2024, Antenna TV was added to 8.2, being moved from KHSV, displacing Rewind TV to subchannel 8.3, which replaced Get as a result.

=== Analog-to-digital conversion ===
KLAS-TV shut down its analog signal, over VHF channel 8, on June 12, 2009, the official date on which full-power television stations in the United States transitioned from analog to digital broadcasts under federal mandate. The station's digital signal remained on its pre-transition VHF channel 7, using virtual channel 8.

=== Translators ===
- K09FL-D Caliente
- K24GY-D Ely
- K17NT-D Ely & McGill
- K31BI-D Kingman, AZ
- K22DR-D Laughlin
- K25PX-D Lund & Preston
- K18IP-D Overton
- K24BY-D Pahrump
- K30PR-D Pahrump
- K06DM-D Panaca
- K09FJ-D Pioche
- K03DS-D Ruth
- K09FK-D Ursine
