= KVVU-TV =

Television station in Henderson, Nevada

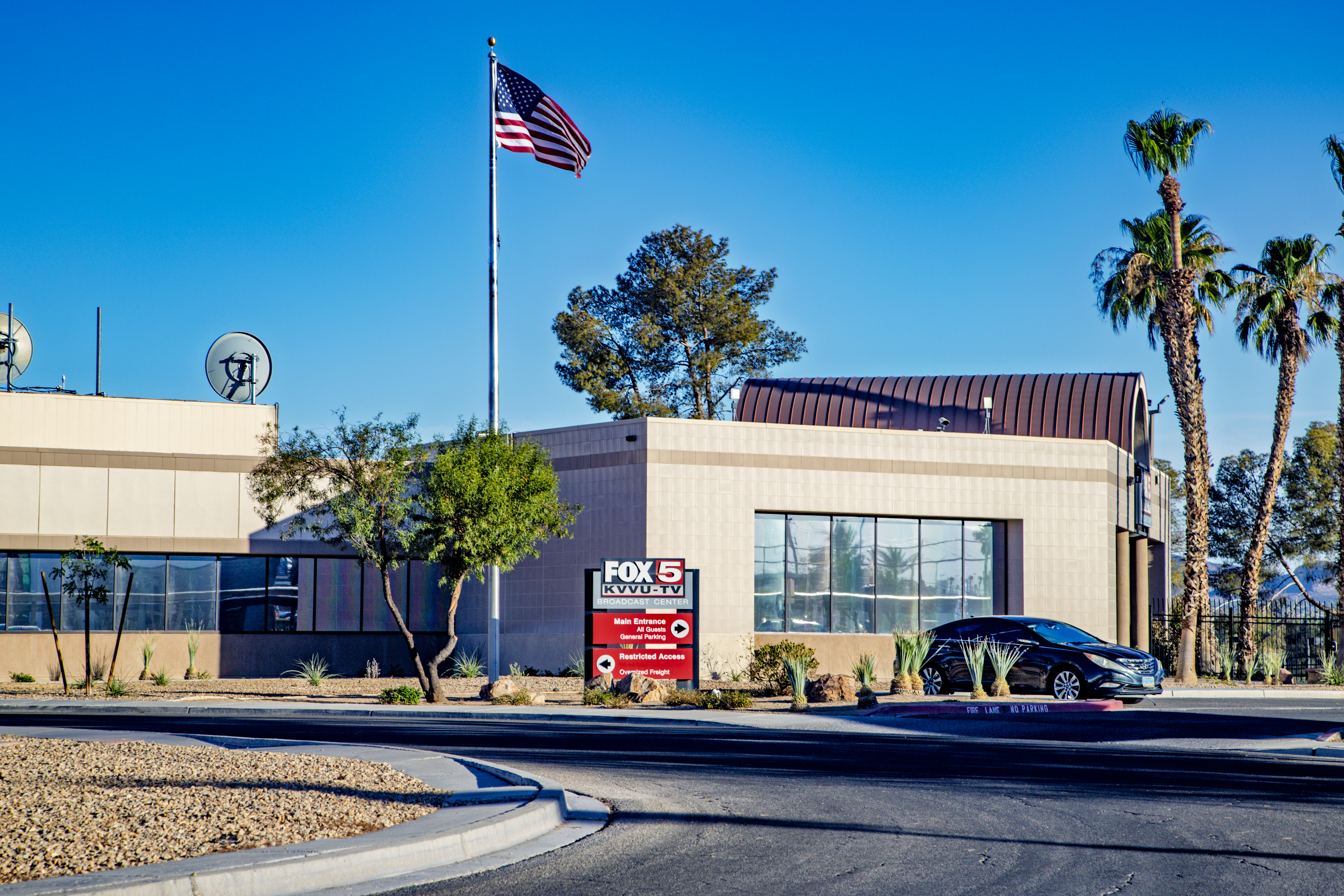
- KVVU-TV studios in 2026
- Henderson–Las Vegas, Nevada; United States
- City: Henderson, Nevada
- Channels: Digital: 9 (VHF); Virtual: 5
- Branding: Fox 5

Programming
- Affiliations: 5.1: Fox; for others, see § Subchannels

Ownership
- Owner: Gray Media; (Gray Television Licensee, LLC)

History
- First air date: September 10, 1967
- Former call signs: KHBV-TV (1967–1971)
- Former channel numbers: Analog: 5 (VHF, 1967–2009)
- Former affiliations: Independent (1967–1986)

Technical information
- Licensing authority: FCC
- Facility ID: 35870
- ERP: 120 kW
- HAAT: 383 m (1,257 ft)
- Transmitter coordinates: 36°0′25.8″N 115°0′24.9″W
- Translator(s): see § Translators

Links
- Public license information: Public file; LMS
- Website: www.fox5vegas.com

KVVU-TV (channel 5) is a television station licensed to Henderson, Nevada, United States, serving the Las Vegas area as an affiliate of the Fox network. Owned by Gray Media, the station maintains studios on West Sunset Road in Henderson (using the 25 TV 5 Drive street address), while its transmitter is located on an unnamed peak in Black Mountain Regional Park near Henderson.

== History ==
KVVU signed on the air on September 10, 1967, as Nevada's first independent station, under the call sign KHBV-TV. The station originally operated from a converted Flying A gas station along Boulder Highway near Sunset Road, while its offices were housed in a modern office building on Flamingo Road. The station was on the air originally from 11 a.m. to midnight and ran a schedule of movies from the 1930s through the 1950s, some cartoons, westerns, and a few sitcoms. Owned first by Charles Vanda, Levin-Townsend Enterprises acquired the station in 1969.

In 1971, the station assumed its KVVU-TV call letters after being purchased by the Nevada Independent Broadcasting Corporation. By 1975, the station was on the air by 7 a.m. and ran a large number of movies, cartoons, more off-network sitcoms, drama shows, and some westerns. Las Vegas was still considered a small market then; in 1975, it was the 140th-largest out of 207 areas of dominant influence. Las Vegas was the smallest market to have four commercial television stations; there were still larger markets that only had two commercial stations and lacked programming from either ABC, NBC, or CBS as a result.

In 1978, the station was sold to Carson Broadcasting, a company owned by talk show host and entertainer Johnny Carson, who visited the station fairly often.

Under Carson's ownership, the station often ran R-rated theatrical films uncut during the late-night and early morning hours. While the afternoon (1 p.m.) and evening (9 p.m.) movies would always be different, the same film would be run uncut in the evening and aired in its censored form in the afternoon, but not on the same day. The evening movie generally reran at 1 a.m. almost every day. Films with questionable content were sometimes prefaced by a pre-recorded warning from Carson.

The Meredith-era "TV5" logo used from 1985 to 1990.

The station's announcer from 1973 to 2001, Ralph Menard, would stretch the hourly station identification out to emphasize the market's larger city, intoning "Henderson..." neutrally, then leading into an elongated and smooth segue to "...and Laaassss Vegas!"; Menard died in 2003. Meredith Corporation bought the station from Carson Broadcasting in 1985. Upon Meredith taking control of the station, KVVU adopted a stylized "TV 5" logo borrowed from its new sister stations, KPHO-TV in Phoenix; WNEM-TV in Bay City, Michigan; KCTV in Kansas City, Missouri; and WTVH in Syracuse, New York. Channel 5 remained an independent station until October 9, 1986, when it became one of the charter affiliates of the newly launched Fox network (it was one of a very few handful of stations located on the VHF dial to align with the new network upon its startup). However, by the time Fox expanded its programming from late nights into evenings in April 1987, network prime time programming initially ran only two days a week (it was not until 1993 that Fox began providing programming on all seven days of the week), so KVVU continued to be essentially programmed as an independent station. In the 1980s, more talk shows were added to the schedule and movies were cut back slightly.

In 1990, the station introduced an on-air mascot named "Rusty the Fox", apparently named after both the network and the station's then-general manager Rusty Durante. The mascot, an anthropomorphic fox (in actuality, a person in a fox costume), is used for community events and at one time was used for announcements for family-oriented information, as well as the block of children's programming called Fox 5 Kids Club.

The station moved into its present studio facilities on Sunset Way in the Green Valley subdivision of Henderson in 1991. The station remained a Fox affiliate during an affiliation deal that was struck between Meredith and CBS in 1994 because that network had a long-term affiliation contract with its existing affiliate KLAS-TV (KPHO and WNEM would both change their network affiliations to CBS through the deal while KCTV was already affiliated with that network); as a result, the Las Vegas market became one of the few television markets to not be affected by the 1994 United States broadcast television realignment. It was one of only five stations (not counting satellites or semi-satellites) under Meredith ownership (the company having recently sold off WTVH) at the time of the deal, and was one of only three Meredith stations to not switch their affiliation from a different network to CBS between 1994 and 1996 (WSMV-TV in Nashville and WOFL-TV in Orlando being the others). In June 2006, the station's website was redesigned (along with those of four of Meredith's other stations). The old website was operated by the Local Media Network division of WorldNow. Internet Broadcasting operated the site until 2011, when WorldNow began a group deal with all of Meredith's stations.

On May 3, 2021, Gray Television announced its intent to purchase the Meredith Local Media division, including KVVU, for $2.7 billion. The sale was completed on December 1.

== Programming ==
In addition to KVVU's local newscasts, the station also produces a locally produced entertainment and lifestyle magazine program called MORE, which took its name from the defunct similarly-named magazine for women 40+ published by former owner Meredith (the MORE program format originated at sister station KPTV in Portland, Oregon). The program debuted on September 12, 2006, and features stories about Las Vegas fashion, local cuisine and events aimed at women between the ages of 25 and 49, MORE is broadcast as an hour-long extension of the station's weekday morning newscast at 10 a.m. and uses the same staff as the newscast's 7–10 a.m. block.

=== Sports programming ===
In 2017, the then Oakland Raiders announced in preparation for their relocation to Las Vegas that KVVU would be the official home for the team's preseason games and other pre-game programming such as the Silver and Black Show in Las Vegas, which began in the 2017 NFL season. After the Raiders completed their relocation ahead of the 2020 season, KVVU was named the team's official broadcast partner. However, KLAS serves as the Raiders' de facto "home" station, by virtue of CBS owning the rights to most games from the American Football Conference, where the Raiders play. In addition to preseason and Fox Sports Sunday afternoon games, KVVU also airs the Raiders' ESPN Monday Night Football, Amazon Prime Video Thursday Night Football and NFL Network appearances.

In 2023, it was announced that KVVU would become the official broadcast partner of the Las Vegas Aces of the WNBA. All Aces games not nationally televised on ESPN, CBS Sports Network, Ion Television, KLAS or KTNV as part of the league's national TV deal are broadcast on KVVU's second digital subchannel branded as the Silver State Sports and Entertainment Network. In addition, a 30-minute show on the Aces is broadcast weekly on KVVU.

In the 2022–23 television season, Gray began to produce a syndicated sports betting show, Beat the Odds, from KVVU's studio.

In 2025, KVVU and Silver State Sports & Entertainment Network aired a two-game spring training series between the Arizona Diamondbacks and the Athletics from Las Vegas Ballpark. KVVU would later announce that they would broadcast 15 regular season Athletics games, simulcast from NBC Sports California, in preparation for the team's move to Las Vegas.

==== Silver State Sports & Entertainment Network ====
Logo of the network

In June 2022, KVVU launched the Silver State Sports & Entertainment Network on its second subchannel. The network airs local Las Vegas–based sports and entertainment programs. Current live sports rights include select sporting events from the University of Nevada, Las Vegas, Las Vegas Aviators baseball games, Vegas Knight Hawks indoor football games, and Las Vegas Lights FC soccer matches. The network previously held the local broadcasting rights to the Las Vegas Aces and G League Ignite basketball games.

=== News operation ===
KVVU-TV presently broadcasts 78 1/2 hours of locally produced newscasts each week (with 14 1/2 hours each weekday and three hours each on Saturdays and Sundays); in regards to the number of hours devoted to news programming, it is the highest local newscast output among Las Vegas' broadcast television stations and highest of any Fox affiliate in the nation; in addition, the station's sports department produces Fox 5 Sports Plus, a 15-minute sports highlight program that airs on Saturday evenings after the 10 p.m. newscast.

Prior to affiliating with Fox, KVVU's news programming consisted solely of daily news updates featured during the station's syndicated programming between the late 1970s and 1986. Meredith Corporation eventually started a news department for KVVU-TV; it began producing a 10 p.m. newscast in June 1998, the Las Vegas market's first local newscast in prime time, the program originated as a weeknight-only half-hour newscast; the broadcast expanded to Saturday and Sunday evenings in June 2002, followed by the expansion of the newscast to an hour-long program in 2003. For the first couple of years, the newscast was solo-anchored by Angelica Urquijo; the station originally did not have a weather anchor or full-time sports anchor; the sports segments were pre-recorded with voice-over work done by boxing analyst Al Bernstein.

In July 1999, the station added a morning newscast that originally aired from 7 to 9 a.m. The following year, the program was expanded by 90 minutes with the addition of a news block from 5:30 to 7 a.m. News programming on channel 5 would not expand again until September 10, 2007, with the debut of an hour-long block of newscasts during the 5 p.m. hour; with the expansion, KVVU-TV became the only local station in Las Vegas carrying a newscast in the 5:30 p.m. timeslot. One year later on August 4, 2008, KVVU debuted a half–hour weeknight–only newscast at 11 p.m. On March 7, 2011, the weekday morning newscast (which consisted of the pre–7 a.m. Fox 5 News This Morning and the 7–9 a.m. Fox 5 News: Live in Las Vegas until 2013, when the program uniformly rebranded under the former title) expanded to 4½ hours, with its start time moved to 4:30 a.m. On July 9, 2012, KVVU debuted a half-hour 6 p.m. newscast.

On April 6, 2020, KVVU added a half-hour 1 p.m. newscast on weekdays, making it one of a few stations airing a 1 p.m. newscast alongside Los Angeles' CW affiliate KTLA and San Diego's Fox affiliate KSWB-TV. On that same day, KVVU expanded its weeknight 11 p.m. newscast to an hour; this made KVVU among the very few stations to extend its late newscast to midnight, and one of six Fox affiliates (Kansas City's WDAF-TV, Washington, D.C.'s WTTG, Atlanta's WAGA-TV, Tampa's WTVT and Phoenix's KSAZ-TV being the others) to air a two-hour late local news block.

On September 5, 2022, KVVU added an hour-long 2 p.m. newscast on weekdays, becoming the first Fox station to air newscasts in that timeslot. Afternoon and evening newscasts now run from 1 to 7:30 p.m.

==== Syndicated programming ====
Because of KVVU's large-scale news schedule, most of the station's syndicated programming airs late at night to appeal to the market's unique "night owl" audience, with little to no paid programming scheduled outside weekends, and the station's Saturday infomercials exclusively from Fox's Weekend Marketplace, itself exclusive to summer and rarely-aired due to Fox Sports preemptions as a side effect of Las Vegas being in the Pacific Time Zone. The station's only daytime syndicated programming consists of TMZ Live at noontime (itself lead into by Gray's national newsmagazine, Investigate TV+) and TMZ before Fox prime time. Appropriately, repeats of the locally produced History Channel series Pawn Stars air in various time periods throughout the week.

==== Notable former on-air staff ====
- Al Bernstein – sports anchor (1998–2002)
- Cher Calvin – weekday morning anchor

== Technical information ==
=== Subchannels ===
The station's signal is multiplexed:

Subchannels of KVVU-TV
Subchannel	Res.	Short name	Programming
5.1	720p	FOX5LV	Fox
5.2	720p	SSSEN	Silver State Sports
5.3	480i	MYSTERY	Ion Mystery
5.4	480i	5DRVtv	5DRVtv
5.5	480i	DEFY	Defy
5.6	480i	Outlaw	Outlaw
5.7	480i	The365	365BLK

=== Analog-to-digital conversion ===
KVVU-TV shut down its analog signal, over VHF channel 5, on June 12, 2009, the official date on which full-power television stations in the United States transitioned from analog to digital broadcasts under federal mandate. The station's digital signal remained on its pre-transition VHF channel 9, using virtual channel 5.

=== Translators ===
- K02OJ-D Caliente
- K19IM-D Duckwater
- K06HT-D Ely (Squaw Peak)
- K28IZ-D Ely (Cave Mountain)
- K15LU-D Eureka
- K35KM-D Eureka
- K28EU-D Laughlin, etc.
- K23ON-D Lund & Preston
- K34ME-D Overton
- K18NA-D Pahrump
- K19BU-D Pahrump
- K34QJ-D Panaca
- K13PU-D Pioche
- K15LY-D Ruth
- K11OW-D Ursine
