= Black Mountain (Nevada) =

Mountain in the McCullough Range, Nevada

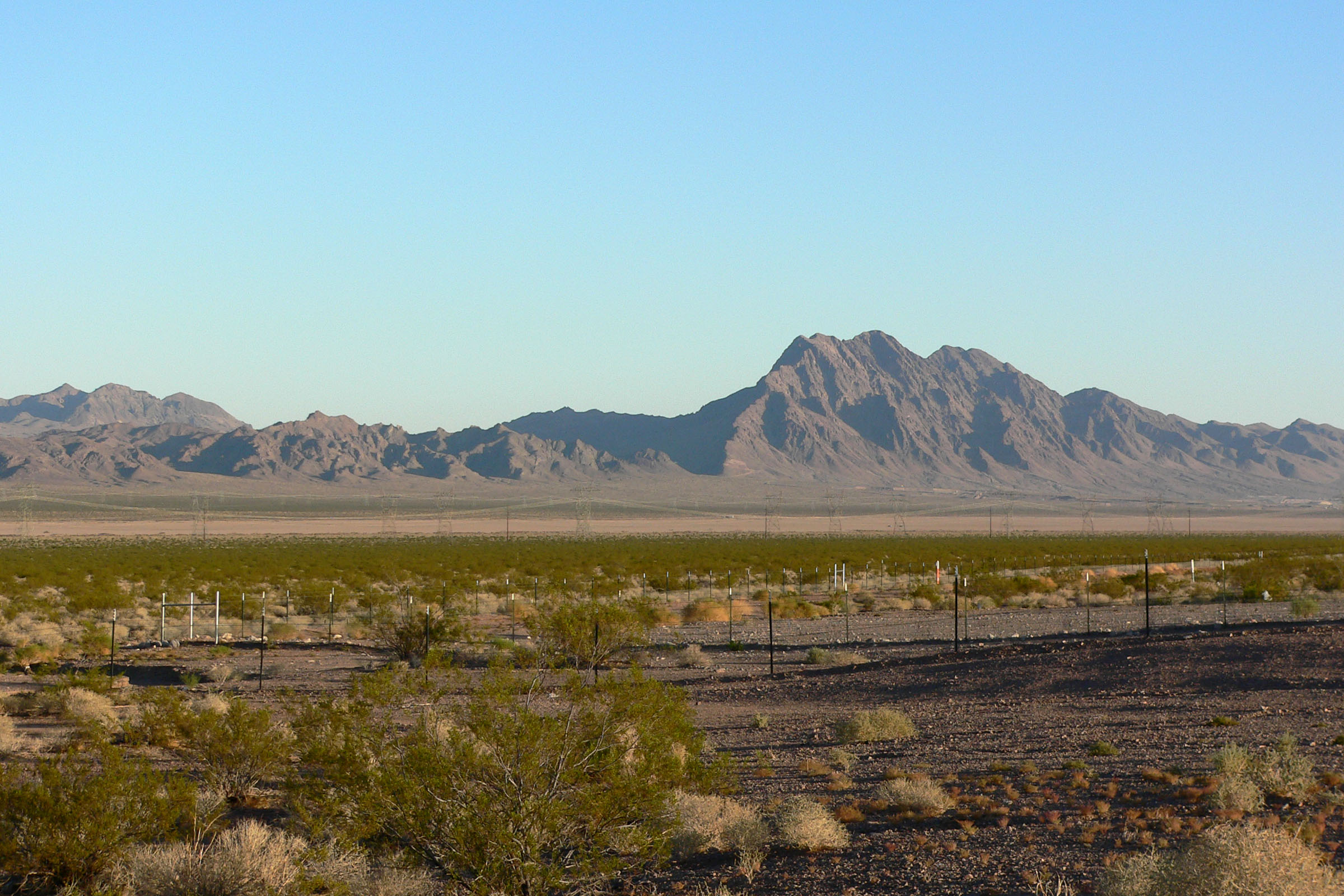
- Black Hill (left) and Black Mountain (right), part of the McCullough Range, as seen from the Eldorado Valley.

Highest point
- Elevation: 5,093 ft (1,552 m) NAVD 88
- Prominence: 1,612 ft (491 m)
- Coordinates: 35°55′52″N 115°02′39″W

Geography
- Location within Nevada
- Location: Clark County, Nevada, U.S.
- Parent range: McCullough Range
- Topo map: USGS Sloan NE

Black Mountain is a landmark mountain south of the Las Vegas Valley. It is one of the more prominent of the mountains in the McCullough Range.

Another mountain, adjacent to Interstate 11 in Henderson, is often mistakenly called "Black Mountain." However, that peak is unnamed.

Black Mountain is home to the transmission towers of many of the Las Vegas area's television and radio stations.

It is owned by the Bureau of Land Management (BLM).

== Hiking and recreation ==
Several trails converge near Black Mountain within the Sloan Canyon National Conservation Area. These trails provide access to much of the conservation area with trail BLM 404 leading to the summit of Black Mountain.

The trail is 6.8 miles, moderately trafficked out, and back trail rated as strenuous due to the last half mile including class two rock scrambling. The trail is primarily used for hiking, walking, trail running, and nature trips and is best used from September until May.

== Name confusion ==
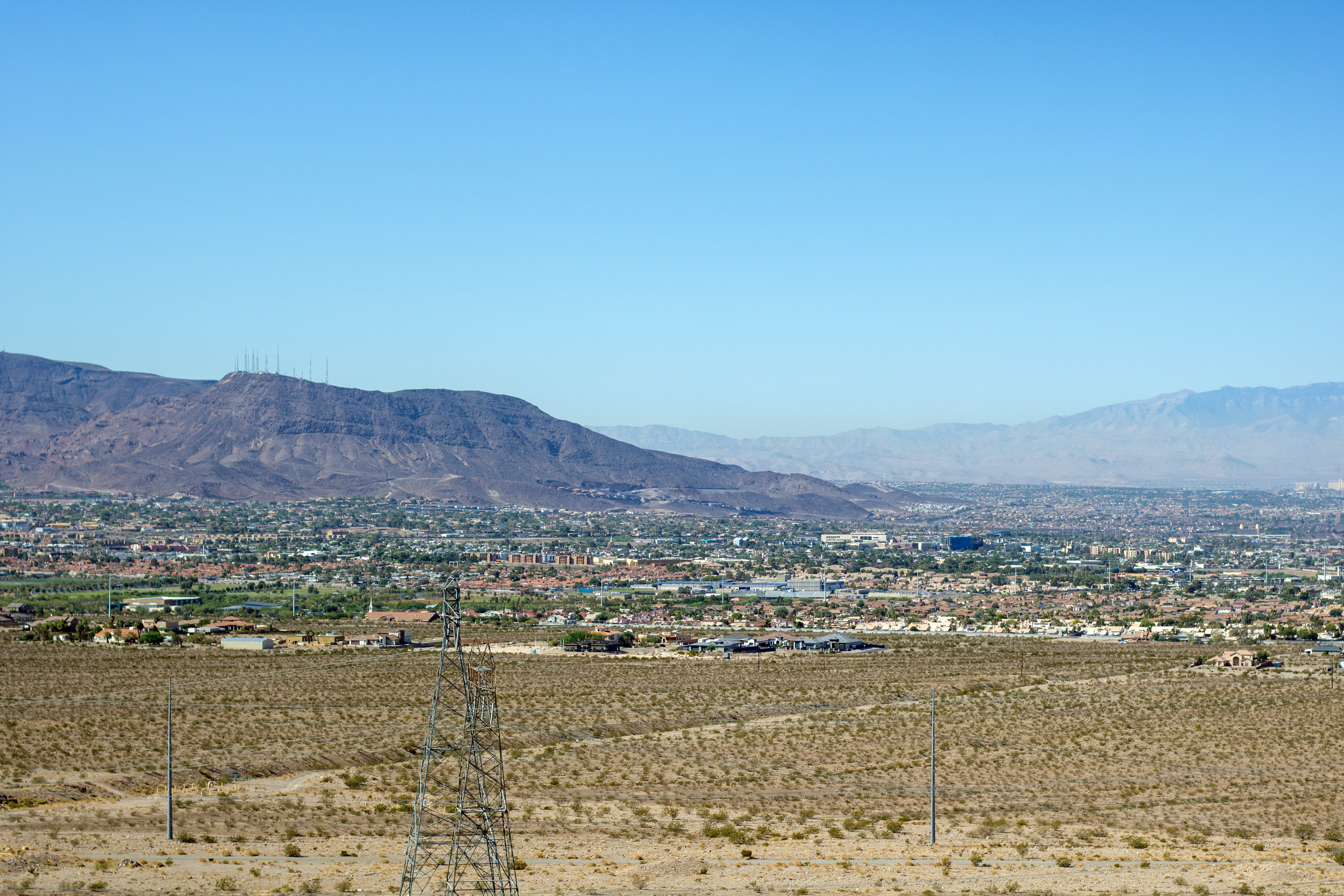
The unnamed peak on the left overlooks downtown Henderson, giving rise to the confusion.

There is common confusion regarding the name “Black Mountain.” Many locals mistakenly refer to the prominent peak adorned with radio and television radio masts and towers overlooking downtown Henderson, the Water Street District near Interstate 11 as Black Mountain.

However, this peak remains officially unnamed. This misidentification is further perpetuated by local references, such as the Black Mountain neighborhood and the Black Mountain Industrial Park. In addition, references in popular culture also reference the peak incorrectly.

Further adding to the confusion, the city of Henderson government itself detailed a plan to create a Black Mountain Nature Preserve encompassing the north-end of the McCullough Range, which includes the unnamed peak. The city received over $5.5 million to build the park and its plan was approved under the Southern Nevada Public Land Management Act. As of 2024, it is currently in the "master design" phase of planning.

== In popular culture ==
- In the 2010 post-apocalyptic game, Fallout: New Vegas, refers to the peak as Black Mountain, a pre-War transmission station rendered uninhabitable to humans by radiation from nuclear blasts. It is populated by super mutants and Nightkin under the leadership of Tabitha in the "State of Utobitha."
