= Charlie Gaddy =

American news presenter (1931–2025)

- Born: September 17, 1931; Roxboro, North Carolina, U.S.
- Died: June 12, 2025 (aged 93); North Carolina, U.S.
- Occupation: Television news anchor

Charlie Gaddy (September 17, 1931 – June 12, 2025) was an American television anchorman for WRAL-TV from Raleigh, North Carolina. He anchored the evening news for over 20 years, before retiring in 1994.

== Life and career ==
Gaddy was born in Roxboro, North Carolina on September 17, 1931, and later grew up in Biscoe, North Carolina. He was a graduate of Guilford College. His first appearance on television was as staff announcer with NBC in 1960. In his 30s, he moved to Raleigh and subsequently worked for radio station WPTF for ten years as the host of Ask Your Neighbor before joining WRAL-TV in 1970 to host Good Morning Charlie After working various other positions at the station, Gaddy was named anchor of the evening newscasts in 1974. By the end of the decade, he was a major part of the number-one-rated Action News 5 team with co-anchor Bobbie Battista, weatherman Bob DeBardelaben and sports anchor Rich Brenner. In 1981, Battista accepted an offer with CNN, Atlanta, and Gaddy became the solo anchor until Adele Arakawa joined in 1983 and Tom Suiter became the new sports anchor in 1981. On July 1, 1994, Gaddy retired from WRAL-TV after 24 years. In 2006, he joined a reunion newscast with Battista, DeBardelaben and Tom Suiter, although he appeared on WRAListens.

The Charlie Gaddy Center for Children was named in honor of Gaddy's public service in support of United Cerebral Palsy of North Carolina.

Gaddy was named to the Mid-South Emmy Award Silver Circle.

Gaddy died on June 12, 2025, at the age of 93.
