= North Carolina News Network =

American radio network

The North Carolina News Network (sometimes called NCNN) is a news and information service established in 1942. It provides programming to approximately 75 radio stations, primarily in the state of North Carolina, and can also be heard by Internet streaming via its website.

== History ==
The roots of this network go back to 1942, when WRAL (1240 AM; now WPJL) in Raleigh, North Carolina began producing agricultural reports for farmers in the Eastern part of the state. Shortly after returning from service in World War II, Ray Wilkinson began delivering agricultural reports in Rocky Mount, North Carolina on radio station WCEC 810 AM (now dark), where he was Program Director. Shortly thereafter, WRAL expressed interest in broadcasting Wilkinson's reports, and the groundwork was laid for the foundation of the Tobacco Radio Network, the predecessor to NCNN.

The network was so-named because tobacco was the leading agricultural crop in Eastern North Carolina, where the oldest stations of the network were based. With the establishment of WRAL-FM in 1946, the network took advantage of its static-free reception and wide coverage area to begin relaying programming to other stations that desired agricultural news. Eventually, the network was available to nearly all of North Carolina through a system of FM repeater stations.

Feeder stations for the network included:

- WRAL-FM/101.5, Raleigh — Main origination station
- WCEC-FM/100.7, Rocky Mount (now WRDU) — Eastern Zone feeder station
- WGBR-FM/99.7, Goldsboro (now WPLW-FM) — Southeastern Zone feeder station
- WGWR-FM/92.3, Asheboro (now WKRR) — Central Zone feeder station
- WEGO-FM/97.9, Concord (now WPEG) — Western Zone feeder station

A companion network, the Tobacco Sports Network, was formed in the mid-1950s to broadcast College Football and College Basketball for the four major universities centered in and around Raleigh. Broadcast commentators for events on this network included Bill Currie and Ray Reeve. It was this network that broadcast the North Carolina Tar Heels’ winning game in the 1957 NCAA basketball championship to a statewide audience.

In 1963, Wilkinson became Farm News Director for WRAL, and the programming he was producing for the network went to Raleigh with him. He became Vice-President of Capitol Broadcasting Company, in charge of both networks, a position he held for 31 years.

With Wilkinson's move to WRAL, operations for the two networks were consolidated by Capitol Broadcasting and renamed the T-N Radio Network. A news staff was hired, and hourly newscasts were begun. During the 1960s, the distinctive three-note news sounder could regularly be heard at 55 minutes past the hour on radio stations across North Carolina.

In 1973, concurrent with programming changes at parent station WRAL-FM, the network was re-imaged to the current "North Carolina News Network" for news, weather and sports reports, while agricultural reports continued as "T-N Farm News."

By 1978, the network had discontinued the FM feeder station distribution, and was carried by telephone lines as a conventional network. That change would only be temporary, as Capitol Broadcasting began satellite distribution of NCNN in 1983.

The satellite bandwidth provided to NCNN by Capitol Satellite Services allowed the network to re-enter sports broadcasting in a big way in the 1990s, offering distribution services for North Carolina State University and Duke University games, and those of the NBA Charlotte Hornets.

In recent years, NCNN has become available to listeners worldwide by streaming audio on the internet.

On August 10, 2009 NCNN owners Capitol Broadcasting Company announced the sale of the network to Curtis Media Group, also of Raleigh. Curtis owns stations in the Raleigh Market, as well as station groups in Wilmington, Goldsboro, Burlington, Winston-Salem and Boone.

== Programming ==
As T-N, the network developed some programming distinctive to North Carolina interests. Being based in Raleigh, the state capital, much of the network's programming dealt with legislative and other governmental activities. A group of stringer reporters informed T-N Network listeners of news from other areas of the state. Statewide and regional weather reports were a fixture on the T-N Network, and daily sports reports dealt almost exclusively with North Carolina high school and college teams.

Daily editorials by WRAL-TV commentator Jesse Helms were broadcast on the T-N Network, and are generally credited as a major contributing factor to his winning election to the U.S. Senate in 1972.

Since becoming NCNN, the network has expanded coverage of high school sports in North Carolina, becoming the major source for scores from football games across the state on Saturday mornings each fall. Coverage of the North Carolina Legislature has become more in-depth, with programs devoted to legislative coverage each year when the Legislature is in session.

NCNN is known for giving extensive, regionalized forecasts for the entire state of North Carolina, prepared by a team of in-house meteorologists (which they share with WRAL-TV and WRAL (FM)).

Some of the current offerings of the North Carolina News Network include:

=== Hourly Newscasts ===
Five minutes of North Carolina news at :55 past each hour

=== Sportscasts ===
News of sporting events with a North Carolina angle air at :25 past the hour in mornings and afternoons.

=== Capitol Link ===
A recap of the day's activities at the state legislature, updated daily Monday through Friday when the North Carolina legislature is in session.

=== Racing Today ===
A rundown of the latest news from stock car racing across North Carolina and throughout the U.S.

== Awards ==
Here are some of the recent awards won by NCNN and its reporters:

2011

- NC Associated Press:
- Best Newscast: David Horn, December 14, 2010
- Best Sports Programming: (Honorable mention) Evolution of NASCAR Spring 2009

2009

- NC Associated Press
- Outstanding News Operation
- Spot News: Clayton Henkel and Ellen Reinhardt, coverage of November's deadly tornado
- Enterprise/Investigative: Clayton Henkel for Beyond the Headlines series "Net Change on the NC Coast"
- Best Feature: Clayton Henkel, Honorable Mention, State Fair report
- Best Sportscast: Bruce Ferrell
- Best Health Report: Clayton Henkel for Beyond the Headlines series "Unplanned Parenthood"
- Best News Writing: Clayton Henkel

2008

- Best website
- Best newscast
- Best Sportscast
- Best Sports Programing
- Best Consumer Report
- Best Series
- Enterprise/Documentary (honorable mention)
- Best Health Report (honorable mention)

2007

- Society of Professional Journalists
- First Place: Green Eyeshade Award – Sports – Racing to the Future
- NC Associated Press
- First Place: Spot News – Apex chemical fire coverage
- First Place: Enterprise/Investigative – Clayton Henkel for Beyond the Headlines "Fueling Our Future"
- First Place: Best Newscast – David Horn
- First Place: Best Sportscast – Bruce Ferrell
- First Place: Best Sports Programming – Clayton Henkel – Heyond the Headlines "Racing to the Future"
- First Place: Best Health Report – Clayton Henkel – Beyond the Headlines "Mercury in Fish"
- Honorable Mention: Best Feature – Clayton Henkel – NASCAR Pigs from the State Fair
- Honorable Mention: Best Series – Clayton Henkel – Beyond the Headlines "Racing to *the Future"
