= Nate Johnson =

Nate Johnson may refer to:

- Nate Johnson (basketball, born 1977), American basketball player
- Nate Johnson (basketball, born 2003), American basketball shooting guard for the Kansas State Wildcats
- Nate Johnson (meteorologist), American meteorologist
- Nate Johnson (baseball), American Negro league pitcher
- Nate Johnson (tackle) (1920–2004), American football tackle
- Nate Johnson (wide receiver) (born 1957), American football wide receiver
- Nate Johnson (quarterback) (born 2004), American football quarterback

== See also ==
- Nathan Johnson (disambiguation)
- Nathaniel Johnson (disambiguation)
