= WTVD =

Television station in Durham, North Carolina

- Durham–Raleigh–; Fayetteville, North Carolina; United States
- City: Durham, North Carolina
- Channels: Digital: 9 (VHF); Virtual: 11
- Branding: ABC11; ABC11 Eyewitness News

Programming
- Affiliations: 11.1: ABC; for others, see § Subchannels

Ownership
- Owner: ABC Owned Television Stations; (WTVD Television, LLC)

History
- First air date: September 2, 1954
- Former channel numbers: Analog: 11 (VHF, 1954–2009); Digital: 52 (UHF, 1999–2009), 11 (VHF, 2009–2020)
- Former affiliations: NBC (primary 1954–1956, secondary 1962–1971); ABC (secondary 1954–1956 and 1957–1962, primary 1956–1957); CBS (secondary 1954–1957, primary 1957–1985)
- Call sign meaning: Television Durham

Technical information
- Licensing authority: FCC
- Facility ID: 8617
- ERP: 45 kW
- HAAT: 615 m (2,018 ft)
- Transmitter coordinates: 35°40′6″N 78°31′58″W

Links
- Public license information: Public file; LMS
- Website: abc11.com

WTVD (channel 11) is a television station licensed to Durham, North Carolina, United States, serving the Research Triangle area. Owned and operated by the ABC television network through its ABC Owned Television Stations division, it maintains studios on Liberty Street in downtown Durham, with news bureaus in Raleigh and Fayetteville. The station's transmitter is located in Auburn, North Carolina.

WTVD began broadcasting on September 2, 1954, as the first VHF television station in the Raleigh–Durham area. It was originally owned by Durham radio interests, including WDNC and the former owners of WTIK, and broadcast from a converted jail and sanatorium in Durham. The station was originally affiliated with NBC and ABC, becoming a sole NBC affiliate after the 1956 sign-on of WRAL-TV in Raleigh. This changed after a group headed by Lowell Thomas acquired WTVD in 1957. The group—which named itself Capital Cities Television and later Capital Cities Communications—had strong ties to CBS, whose local affiliate WNAO-TV was a disadvantaged UHF station, and the station became a CBS affiliate with supplemental programming from ABC (1957–1962) and NBC (1962–1971). During this era, the station was on the first network for Atlantic Coast Conference men's basketball and aired a long-running magazine show, At Home with Peggy Mann, and local newscasts. The present downtown Durham studios opened in 1978.

Capital Cities purchased ABC in 1985, prompting WTVD and WRAL-TV to switch affiliations. From the late 1980s to the mid-1990s, WTVD was in close competition with WRAL-TV, the market's traditional news leader, for overall ratings leadership, adding newscasts as well as a news bureau in Fayetteville. Since then, WTVD has generally rated a more distant but competitive second-place. With the increasing population weight of Raleigh and Wake County in the Triangle, WTVD has over the years devoted more resources to covering the area, including opening the present downtown Raleigh studio in 2005. Most newscasts originated from Raleigh between 2018 and 2025.

== History ==
=== Construction and early years ===
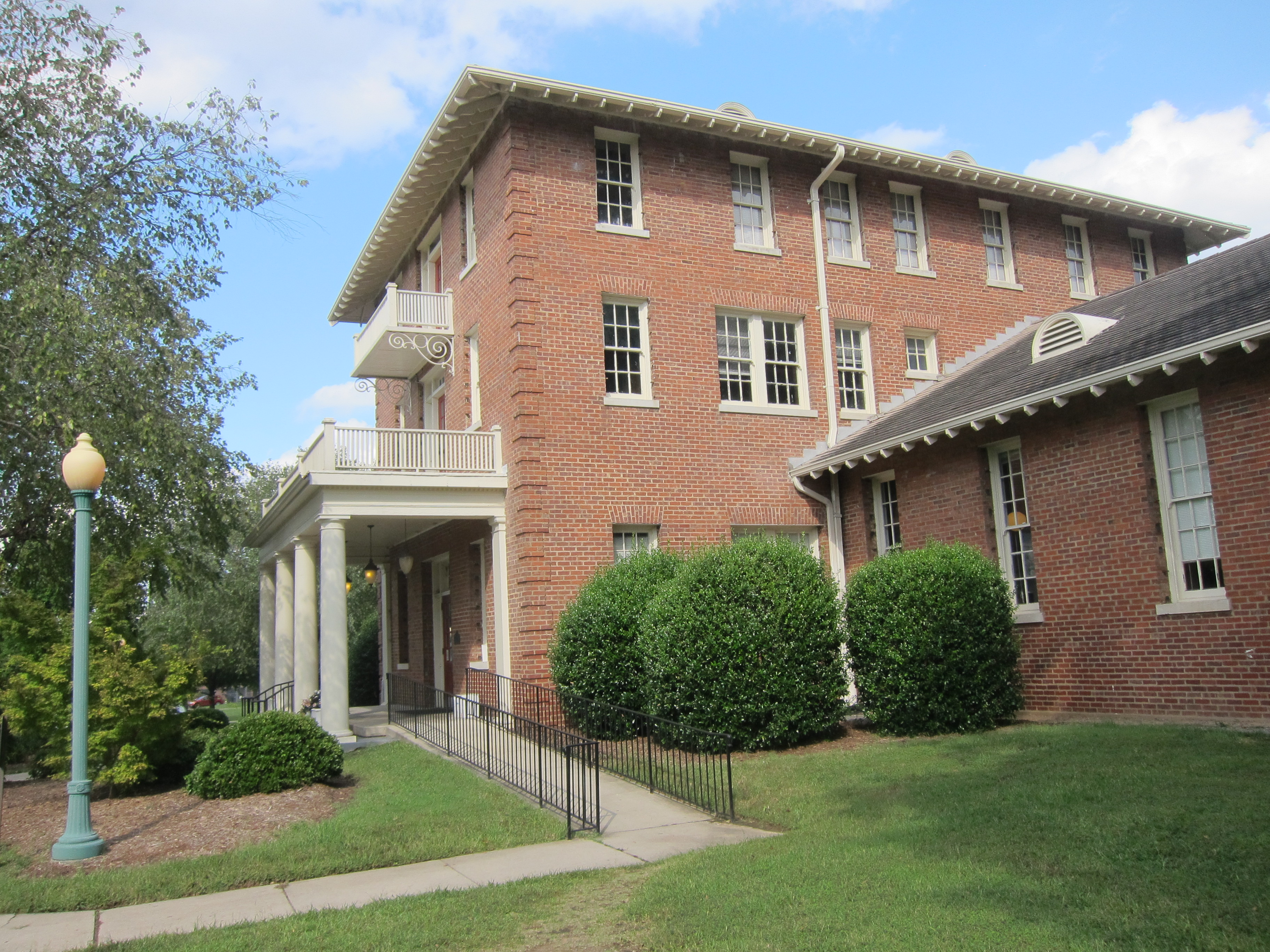
This former tuberculosis sanatorium, now on the National Register of Historic Places as the North Durham County Prison Camp, housed WTVD's studios from 1954 to 1978.

In 1952, the Federal Communications Commission (FCC) ended its multiple-year freeze on new television station grants. Durham, North Carolina, was allocated one channel in the VHF band, channel 11, and three applicants had sought stations in Durham prior to the freeze: Mary Pickford Rogers, Harold H. Thoms, and Durham Radio Corporation. When the freeze was lifted, a fourth group, Durham Broadcasting Enterprises, also filed. The latter two applicants were each associated with Durham radio stations, Durham Radio Corporation with WDNC and Durham Broadcasting Enterprises with WTIK. These were the only two applicants that continued pursuing their stations after the freeze; the FCC dismissed the Pickford and Thoms applications on October 9, 1952, and ordered the two radio stations into comparative hearing for the channel. WDNC, anticipating a win, set up a television workshop across the street from its studios and made plans to build a new facility for WDNC radio and television were it to obtain the permit. WTIK sold shares in its proposed station to 58 residents of Durham.

The hearing opened on November 18, 1953, but after a month, the two radio stations entered into negotiations on a possible merger. The deal, announced at noon on December 24, was the front-page story of that afternoon's edition of The Durham Sun, proclaiming "Durham Gets Christmas Gift—Bids For TV Station Combined". The agreement parceled out the television station ownership, with the Duncan and Fletcher families (major stockholders in WTIK), WTIK's 58 television shareholders, and Durham Radio Corporation each owning 25-percent interest. Because WDNC joined WTIK's application, WTIK radio had to be sold. An FCC hearing examiner recommended approval of the permit grant to the merged applicant on January 13, 1954, and the permit was officially awarded on January 21. Though the permit was originally designated WTIK-TV, in view of the fact that WTIK would need to be divested, the call sign WTVD (Watch Television, Durham) was secured. It had previously been registered for fictitious use by the 20th Century Fox film studio in the 1953 film Taxi. At the time, the FCC granted call signs for two-year terms to fictitious stations in movies and books.

Durham Broadcasting Enterprises now had to find a studio site for the new station. The group took interest in a former tuberculosis sanatorium, which had been closed the year prior when the city of Durham and Durham County discontinued financial support. This facility, built in 1926 as a jail and converted later into a Works Progress Administration sewing center and the sanatorium, was converted for television use. One ward had high ceilings and was refitted as a studio; the X-ray room became a darkroom for film processing; and other wards were converted into offices and shop space. Lebanon Peak was selected as the transmitter site, where work began in mid-May. The station affiliated with NBC, which only had one VHF affiliate in the state (WSJS-TV in Winston-Salem), and ABC. WTVD began broadcasting test patterns on August 12 and regular programs on September 2. In 1955, effective radiated power was increased to the high-VHF maximum of 316,000 watts. The next year, WRAL-TV (channel 5) opened in Raleigh and took with it the NBC affiliation. Some CBS programs also aired on channel 11; CBS's regular affiliate in the market was WNAO-TV (channel 28), a UHF station.

In its early years, WTVD produced local programming beyond the field of news. One of the station's first programs was At Home with Peggy Mann, a women's interest magazine that continued on the air for 26 years until Mann's retirement in December 1980. In 1956, a member of WTVD's staff, John D. Loudermilk, composed "A Rose and a Baby Ruth"; the song was acquired by a local record label and sung by George Hamilton IV, becoming a popular record. The next year, Floyd Fletcher was responsible for helping C. D. Chesley put together a network of stations to broadcast the 1957 NCAA basketball tournament, a precursor to Chesley's syndicated telecasts of Atlantic Coast Conference basketball.

=== Lowell Thomas purchase and change to CBS ===
In 1957, the Durham Television Company, headed by veteran CBS News commentator Lowell Thomas, agreed to purchase WTVD from Durham Broadcasting Enterprises, retaining components of the old ownership in the station's management. Thomas also owned WCDA-TV serving Albany, New York. The merger was effective that August and created a new parent company, Capital Cities Television Corporation. It was so named because WCDA-TV and WTVD, serving Albany and Raleigh, broadcast to the capital cities of their respective states.

Thomas's purchase immediately raised speculation that an affiliation switch was coming. CBS was known to be unhappy with its affiliation with WNAO-TV. The prospect of affiliation shuffling if WTVD became an affiliate led Variety to speculate on effects for stations that overlapped WTVD's signal, such as WFMY-TV in Greensboro, an existing CBS affiliate. Rumors became reality on October 3, 1957, when WTVD announced it would become the Raleigh–Durham area's CBS affiliate in about six months' time. WNAO-TV, which was trying to get a VHF channel allocated for its use, announced it would close on December 31, in effect forcing the switch earlier than anticipated. At that time, programs had to be approved by their sponsors to switch stations; as a result, some CBS programs went unseen while arrangements were made to air them over WTVD. In the meantime, one ABC program made its way to WRAL-TV's lineup at WTVD's request. WRAL-TV became an ABC affiliate in 1962, and WTVD took its place in NBC's affiliate roster. With only channels 5 and 11 as network affiliates, the stations had to shoehorn as many programs as possible from three networks on two signals. WTVD had first call rights to CBS and NBC programs, which sometimes aired on WRAL-TV when they could not be scheduled on channel 11. The station was known to have a strong preference for CBS; in 1966, a columnist for the University of North Carolina at Chapel Hill's student newspaper, The Daily Tar Heel, opined that WTVD let NBC programs play a "poor second fiddle".

Raleigh–Durham gained a third commercial station in 1968, when WRDU-TV (channel 28) began in Durham. WRDU-TV had no primary network affiliation and instead aired those network programs not featured on WTVD's schedule, as well as NBC's national news programming. WTVD still had the right of first refusal to CBS and NBC programs; series that were successful could be selected by WTVD and thus removed from WRDU's schedule. WRDU's owner, Triangle Telecasters, petitioned the FCC in November 1969 for relief from this situation. In 1971, the FCC ruled in favor of Triangle Telecasters (in part due to the commission's then-policy of protecting the development of UHF stations), setting a precedent for similar cases elsewhere. The ruling forced WTVD to choose one network; it chose CBS, forcing NBC to sign with WRDU-TV by default ahead of the 1971–72 television season. This precedent became known as the "Raleigh Rule".

=== Move to downtown Durham ===
In May 1976, the Durham Redevelopment Commission accepted a bid by Capital Cities for a 7.5-acre (3.0 ha) land parcel, which would be divided with 4 acres gifted for a new county library and the remainder for a new studio for WTVD. The Liberty Street studio was completed in May 1978; the former studio was gifted to Carolina Christian Communications, the permittee of a new Triangle television station, WLFL (channel 22). On December 31, 1998, the building was listed on the National Register of Historic Places as the North Durham County Prison Camp.

Less than a year later, on March 4, 1979, a fire starting in a prop area caused significant damage to the building, destroying three cameras and both studios. The newsroom suffered damage but not the control room. The station was back on the air the next day, with an executive conference room pressed into service as a makeshift news studio and business offices housing the entire news staff. Much of the rear suffered significant structural damage. Repair work was completed by August. Later that year, WTVD began broadcasting from a 2,000-foot (610 m) tower in Garner, which station officials claimed would expand its viewing area by 30 percent.

=== Affiliation switch to ABC ===
In 1985, Capital Cities agreed to buy ABC. The deal put the company, which owned two CBS affiliates including WTVD, in a bind. ABC's existing Raleigh–Durham affiliate, WRAL-TV, was the higher-rated station, and some expected Capital Cities to put WTVD on the market. It did not, leading to an affiliation switch. WRAL-TV signed with CBS on July 12, setting up an affiliation change on August 4, 1985, three months before the FCC approved the Capital Cities–ABC merger.

The merger and affiliation switch came right as WTVD passed WRAL in total-day ratings for the first time and even by one survey had a slightly higher share of 6 p.m. news viewers, but with ABC then running a poor third in national ratings, WRAL moved back into the lead in total-day and news ratings. In the wake of the switch, WTVD—traditionally seen as the "Durham station"—sought to increase its ratings in Raleigh by projecting a regional image. By November 1987, WTVD had narrowly moved past WRAL-TV in the total-day and news ratings, a lead it held for several surveys.

Early on the morning of December 7, 1991, WTVD's news helicopter, returning from a high school football game in Wilmington, crashed into a field between Raleigh and Fuquay-Varina, killing three occupants: the pilot, an engineer, and a photographer. Sports reporter Tony Debo was the only survivor, thrown from the aircraft still strapped to his seat. He recounted the engine failing mid-flight. The National Transportation Safety Board, in its 1993 report into the crash, determined that an engine bearing seized after a light came on indicating metal fragments in the engine oil. It attributed probable cause to "the pilot's improper decision in continuing the flight with a known engine problem".

On April 28, 2026, the FCC ordered ABC to file early broadcast license renewals for its eight TV stations. The early renewal order—which criticized diversity, equity and inclusion policies of ABC's corporate owner, The Walt Disney Company—came after the network's late night talk show Jimmy Kimmel Live! aired a joke about Melania Trump and calls from President Donald Trump for Kimmel to be fired. Though the FCC has the right to order early renewals, the process had been seldom used. ABC submitted early renewal applications in May 2026, saying it did so "under protest", and alleged that the action was unlawful, retaliatory against the network, and intended to suppress speech.

== Raleigh and Fayetteville facilities ==
WTVD was the first Raleigh–Durham station to establish a news bureau in Fayetteville, North Carolina, opening in 1984. In the years that followed, Fayetteville and Cumberland County became a WTVD news ratings stronghold, leading WRAL-TV to open its own bureau there in 1990. The bureau moved in 2013 to the Robert C. Williams Business Center, located on Hay Street downtown. Fayetteville bureau reporter Greg Barnes remained with the station for more than 30 years until retiring in 2017.

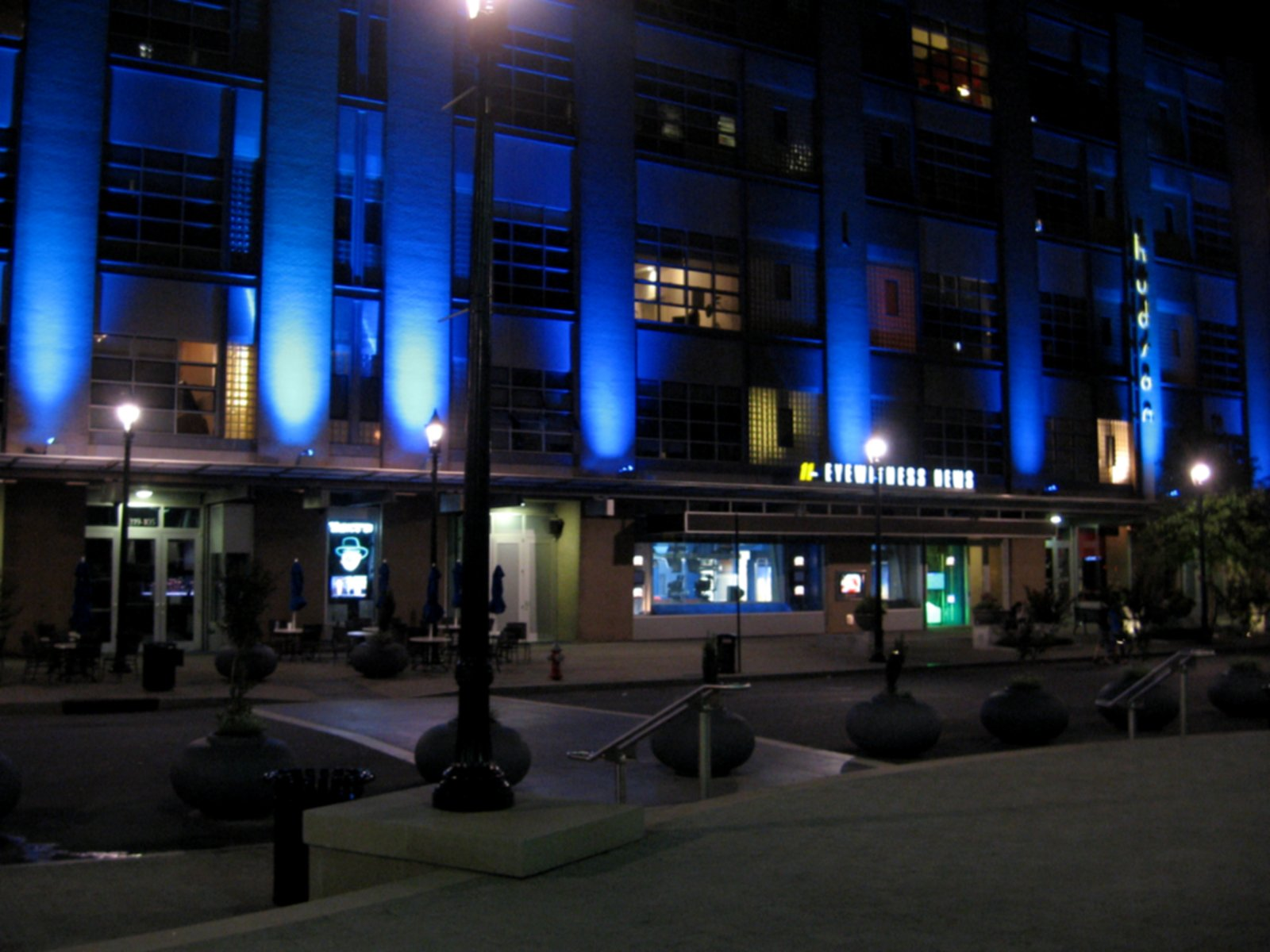
The WTVD Raleigh Eyewitness News Center

Over time, WTVD increased its coverage of Raleigh and Wake County, which over the course of the late 20th century grew faster than Durham. In 2005, WTVD expanded its physical presence in Raleigh by opening a 5,500-square-foot (510 m^{2}) studio on Raleigh's Fayetteville Street Mall, taking up part of the former Hudson Belk department store. The news set in the Raleigh studio was designed by the same firm that had produced the set used by Good Morning America at Times Square Studios in New York City. Previously, WTVD had a Raleigh bureau but could not present live reports from there. The Raleigh Eyewitness News Center originally housed between 12 and 14 station employees. In 2018, the studio was upgraded and began being used for the morning, noon, and 4 and 5:30 p.m. newscasts, with the remaining evening newscasts originating from Durham. Production of all newscasts moved back to Durham in 2025, as a result of upgrading of the Durham studio, though some reporters and photographers remain based in Raleigh.

== News operation ==
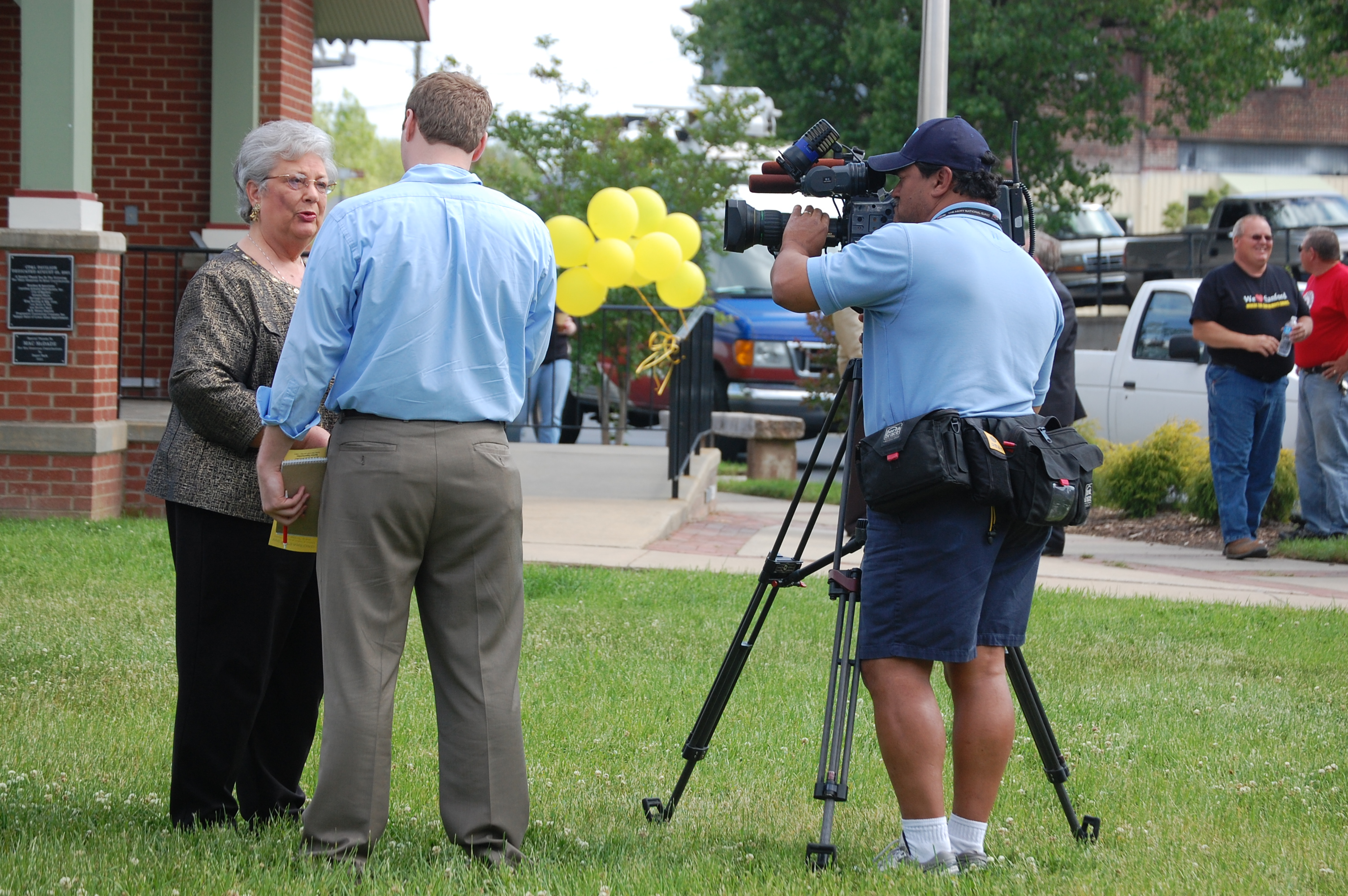
A WTVD news crew interviews the mayor of Sanford, North Carolina, in 2012

WTVD's newscasts have primarily competed with WRAL-TV, which has traditionally led and at times dominated the news market in the Raleigh–Durham area. By 1978, WRAL had a 50-percent audience share for its evening newscast, WTVD just 29 percent, and WPTF-TV (then the NBC affiliate) 7 percent or less. That year WTVD attempted a retooling of its anchor team with new personnel from across the United States, but the new format failed to show the desired improvement, while WRAL-TV had the highest-rated newscast in a top-50 U.S. market. In 1980, the station tried again, replacing male anchor Bob Hughes with Steve Leeolou. With ratings still well off WRAL-TV's pace, Leeolou was replaced in February 1983 by Larry Stogner, who previously had served as chief investigative reporter and Raleigh reporter and at one point had been anchor himself.

In the mid-1980s, WTVD saw growth in its early evening newscast attributable to several factors. One was the decision to move the popular The Oprah Winfrey Show to 4 p.m. in March 1987, creating a strong lead-in; the other was the length of the newscast. At the time, WRAL-TV presented an hour-long 6 p.m. local newscast, while WTVD offered a 30-minute report. From 1981 to 1987, WRAL's audience share declined 11 percentage points; after Oprah was moved on WTVD's schedule, WTVD took the lead in early evening news. The station debuted a second early evening local newscast in September 1988 when it debuted WTVD 11 News at 5:30, which competed with a similar effort launched the same day by WRAL-TV. WRAL's schedule change and a new syndicated programming acquisition—The Cosby Show—helped that station counter WTVD's surge. In 1990, Miriam Thomas was paired with Stogner on the 11 p.m. newscast.

With the 1985 affiliation switch, WTVD began airing a morning newscast, originally alternating 15-minute segments with a network feed from ABC. The morning news expanded to 6 a.m. in 1992. A Sunday morning newscast launched in 1996, and the weekday morning newscast was expanded to two hours in 1999. Morning news was an area where WTVD was more competitive with WRAL in the ratings than in evening and late news.

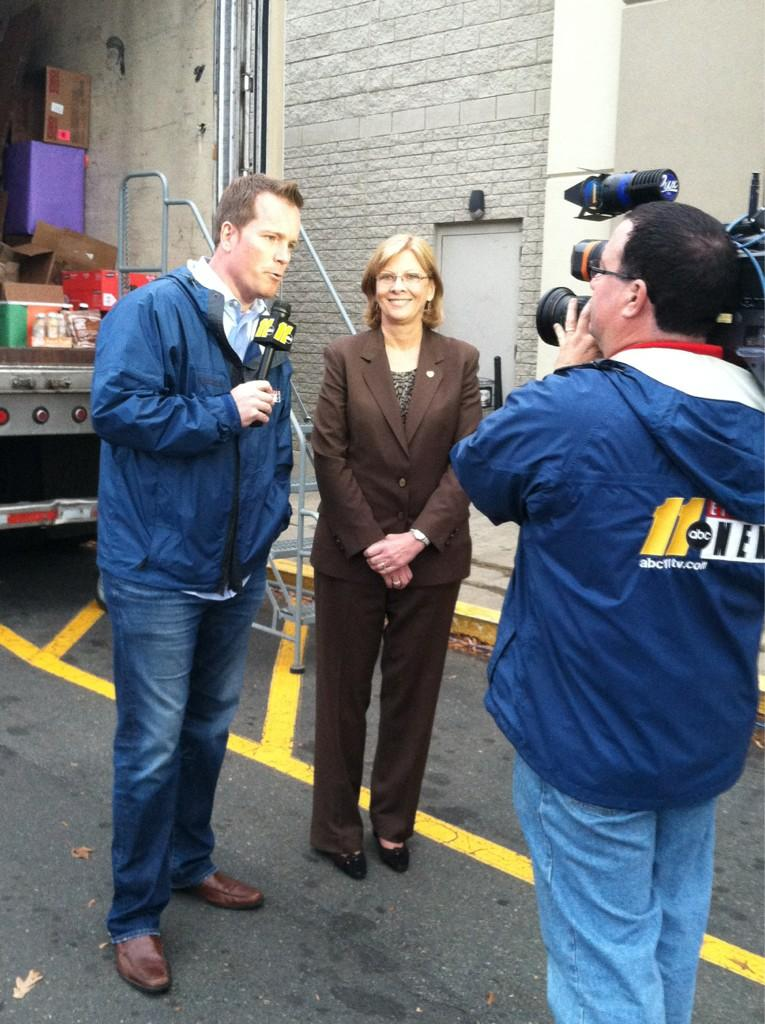
A WTVD news crew interviewing Mayor of Raleigh Nancy McFarlane in 2012

To blunt WTVD's early evening success, WRAL shuffled its afternoon lineup in 1993 and moved the CBS soap opera The Young and the Restless to 4 p.m. to compete against Oprah. The move worked; though it remained close between the two stations, WRAL began to pull away. In 1995, news director Lee Meredith was replaced. His replacement was Mark Casey, previously of WHIO-TV in Dayton, Ohio. Casey brought a format heavy on breaking news that had worked for him in Dayton. During Casey's tenure, WRAL widened its lead, with ratings slipping in most newscasts as WRAL bolstered its weather and online presences. Several reporters and anchors departed the station. At 5:30 p.m., WTVD found itself attracting just over half as many viewers as WRAL by May 1997. Casey departed in 1998. In the years that followed, WTVD attempted to differentiate itself with WRAL-TV. It added a new traffic helicopter and made changes in its anchor lineup, with Stogner moving off the 11 p.m. newscast and Thomas departing in 2001.

From 2006 to 2022, WTVD produced a 10 p.m. newscast for WLFL (channel 22), the Raleigh–Durham market's CW affiliate. WTVD debuted an hour-long 4 p.m. newscast in May 2011 and expanded its weekend late newscasts the next year. Stogner retired on January 23, 2015, and announced he had been diagnosed with amyotrophic lateral sclerosis; he died on October 3, 2016.

By 2021, WTVD and WRAL were back to being very close, with tenths of rating points separating WRAL and WTVD in mornings and at 5 and 11 p.m. A streaming news channel with a 7 a.m. morning news expansion debuted in 2022. The next year, WTVD introduced a 10 a.m. newscast. As of April 2026, the station produced 47 1/2 hours a week of news programming.

== Notable former on-air staff ==
- Kate Bolduan – reporter, 2007–2008
- Rich Brenner – sports director, 1982–1986
- David Hartman – weekend announcer, 1955
- Byron Pitts – intern, 1980
- Jim Rosenfield – reporter, 1980–1981
- Stuart Scott – intern, late 1980s
- John Tesh — anchor and producer, –1976
- Diana Williams – part-time, early 1980s

== Technical information ==
=== Subchannels ===
WTVD's transmitter is located in Auburn, North Carolina. The station's signal is multiplexed:

Subchannels of WTVD
Subchannel	Res.	Short name	Programming
11.1	720p	WTVD-D1	ABC
11.2	720p	LOCLish	Localish
11.3	480i	CHARGE!	Charge!
11.4	480i	HSN	HSN
28.3	480i	COMET	Comet (WRDC)

Broadcast on behalf of another station

WTVD began broadcasting a digital signal on UHF channel 52 on October 30, 1999. WTVD ended regular programming on its analog signal, over VHF channel 11, on June 12, 2009, the official digital television transition date. The station's digital signal moved from channel 52 to VHF channel 11. This created difficulties in some cases for reception, particularly as WTVD was at the time the only local station broadcasting a VHF signal. On June 30, 2020, WTVD moved from channel 11 to channel 9 as a result of the 2016 United States wireless spectrum auction.

WTVD is a participating station in the Raleigh–Durham market's ATSC 3.0 (NextGen TV) service, which launched in 2020.
