= WKXR =

- Asheboro, North Carolina; United States
- Frequency: 1260 kHz
- Branding: 94.9 FM Classic Country

Programming
- Format: Classic country
- Affiliations: AP Radio, North Carolina News Network, NC State Wolfpack, Carolina Panthers

Ownership
- Owner: Dorothy Grace Keith; (South Triad Broadcasting Corp.)

History
- First air date: May 24, 1947; 78 years ago
- Former call signs: WGWR (1947–1984)

Technical information
- Licensing authority: FCC
- Facility ID: 55102
- Class: B
- Power: 5,000 watts day 500 watts night
- Transmitter coordinates: 35°43′26.00″N 79°48′21.00″W
- Translator: 94.9 W235CO (Asheboro)

Links
- Public license information: Public file; LMS
- Webcast: Limited
- Website: wkxr.com

WKXR (1260 AM) is a radio station broadcasting a classic country music format. Licensed to Asheboro, North Carolina, United States, the station is owned by Dorothy Grace Keith, through licensee South Triad Broadcasting Corp., and features programming from AP Radio and Jones Radio Network. The station was established in 1947 as WGWR, and is simulcast on translator station W235CO (94.9 FM).

== History ==
The station signed on May 24, 1947, as WGWR. It changed its call letters to WKXR on April 4, 1984. When Chris Kelly of WKRR worked at WKXR as a teenager, the station's playlist included Patsy Cline, Hank Williams Jr. and Tammy Wynette.

Former logo

WKXR started its broadcast day at 5:00 a.m. and ended its broadcast day at 11:00 p.m. However, in recent years, WKXR has continued to broadcast from 11:00 p.m. to 5:00 a.m. WKXR turns its power down at 11:00 pm, but its feed still plays on Time Warner Cable of Asheboro's channel 8, a local Public-access television cable TV channel mainly used for local bulletins.

== Programming ==
WKXR also broadcasts live sporting events such as NASCAR racing, college football, college basketball, NFL football, and local high school sports (for Asheboro High School and Southwestern Randolph High School), in addition to American Legion Post 45 baseball, Asheboro Copperheads baseball and news from the North Carolina News Network. One of WKXR's most enduring features is the Swap Shop, a call-in show used to sell used items. WKXR plays a mix of classic country and modern country. On Sundays, WKXR carries Sunday morning worship services from local churches.

== Translator ==
Broadcast translator for WKXR
Call sign	Frequency	City of license	FID	ERP (W)	Class	Transmitter coordinates	FCC info
W235CO	94.9 FM	Asheboro, North Carolina	156964	250	D	35°43′24.5″N 79°48′21.9″W	LMS
