= Nathaniel Johnson =

Nathaniel Johnson may refer to:

- Nathaniel Johnson (politician) (1644–1712), soldier, Member of Parliament and colonial governor of South Carolina
- Nate Johnson (tackle) (Nathaniel Elijah Johnson, 1920–2004), American football tackle
- Nate Johnson (wide receiver) (Nathaniel Johnson, born 1957), American football wide receiver
- Nate Johnson (basketball, born 1977) (Nathanel Johnson, born 1977), American basketball player

== See also ==
- Nathaniel Johnston (1627–1705), English physician, political theorist and antiquary
- Nathan Johnson (disambiguation)
- Nate Johnson (disambiguation)
