= Nathan Johnson =

Nathan Johnson may refer to:

- Nathan Johnson (abolitionist) (1797–1880), African-American abolitionist
- Nathan Johnson (architect), (1926–2021), African-American architect in Detroit
- Nathan Johnson (canoeist) (born 1976), American Olympic canoer
- Nate Johnson (meteorologist), American meteorologist
- Nathan Johnson (musician) (born 1976), American film composer, songwriter and music producer
- Nathan Johnson (politician) (born 1968), American politician and composer
- Nathan Johnson, placeholder running mate of Evan McMullin in the 2016 United States presidential election
- Nathan Johnson, conspirator in the 2008 Barack Obama assassination plot in Denver

== See also ==
- Nathan and Mary (Polly) Johnson properties, named for the abolitionist
- Nathaniel Johnson (disambiguation)
- Nate Johnson (disambiguation)
