= Brain Game =

Brain Game or Brain Games may refer to:

== Television ==
- Brain Game (1972 TV program), a local quizbowl television show in Indianapolis, Indiana, U.S. that debuted in 1972
- Braingames (1983 TV series), mid-1980s educational program shown on HBO
- Brain Game (1997 TV program), a local quizbowl television show in Raleigh, North Carolina, U.S. that debuted in 1997
- Brain Games (2011 TV series), a 2011 American cognitive science television series broadcast by National Geographic Channel
- "Brain Game," a 2013 episode of the Cartoon Network series Uncle Grandpa

== Video games ==
- Brain Games, a 1978 video game by Atari
- Atari Game Brain, an unreleased 1978 video game console
- Rayman Brain Games, a 2000 educational video game
- Game brain, a 2002 claim about video games in Japan
- Ultimate Brain Games, a 2003 video game containing several thinking games

== Software ==
- Brain training - software marketed as improving cognitive function
