= Shelter-in-place =

Act of seeking safety in the building one is in

Shelter-in-place (SIP; also known as a shelter-in-place warning, SAME code SPW) is the act of seeking safety within the building one already occupies, rather than evacuating the area or seeking a community emergency shelter. The American Red Cross says the warning is issued when "chemical, biological, or radiological contaminants may be released accidentally or intentionally into the environment" and residents should "select a small, interior room, with no or few windows, taking refuge there."

== Radiological and chemical contamination ==
Shelter in place in radiological and chemical defense scenarios entails closing all household doors, windows, and vents and taking immediate shelter in a readily accessible location that puts as much indoor air and radiation shielding-mass between the individual and the hazardous outside air, such as a basement or centrally located medium to small room, and trying to make it as airtight as possible by shutting off all ventilation/HVAC systems and extensively sealing the shelter's doors and windows from all outside air contaminants with damp towels, or if available, plastic sheeting and adhesive tape. Diagrams of what sheltering in place entails following a chemical, biological, radiological or nuclear (CBRN) threat, and how long it is advised to be done for, is provided by the U.S. Federal Emergency Management Agency-affiliated website Ready.gov.

Shelter-in-place effectiveness has been evaluated and experimental results show that proper sealing can make a substantial difference to a normal home shelter, finding it to be at least twice as effective against a host of airborne substances when compared against simply staying inside and not implementing the countermeasure, and in most airborne contaminant cases, it is usually much more effective, depending on the particle size of the substance in question. If the occupant's breathing is the only consumer of oxygen and producer of carbon dioxide in the room, then carbon dioxide levels would not begin to reach dangerous values until 3+ hours had passed, in most likely, 4-person home scenarios.

In the military, "Shelter-in-Place" is comparable to "buttoning up" and has proved life-saving in certain nuclear fallout instances.

The danger of radiation from radioactive precipitation/"fallout" decreases with time, as radioactivity decays exponentially with time, such that for each factor of seven increase in time, the radiation is reduced by a factor of ten. Creating the following 7-10 rule-of-thumb after a typical nuclear detonation while under the conditions that all fallout that will fall on the land has done so completely and no further deposition in the area will occur - After 7 hours, the average dose rate outside is reduced by a factor of ten; after 49(7x7) hours, it is reduced by a further factor of ten (to a value of 1/100 of the initial dose rate); after two weeks the radiation from the fallout will have reduced by a factor of 1000 compared to the initial level; and after 14 weeks the average dose rate will have reduced to 1/10,000 of the initial level.

If an individual finds themselves outside during an emergency that calls for shelter-in-place, then effective but low-tech decontamination is required before entering into the shelter.

== Violence ==
The phrase "shelter-in-place" has also been used, for precautions to be taken by the public when violence has occurred or might occur (particularly in shootings) in the area and the perpetrator is believed to still be in the area but not apprehended. The public in the area is advised to carry out all the same tasks as a typical shelter-in-place but without the key step of sealing the shelter up to prevent outside air from circulating indoors, in this scenario people are simply urged to lockdown — stay indoors and "close, lock and stay away from external doors and windows."

In light of active shooter events and the panic that can ensue, a lockdown alert issued as "shelter in place", can also be implemented as a response to armed events, such as the 2014 Fort Hood shootings. Similarly a lockdown alert was likewise issued as a "Shelter-in-place" alert by the Massachusetts Emergency Management Agency over the cell phone Wireless Emergency Alerts service for local residents during the manhunt for the Boston Marathon bombing suspects.

When a manhunt is being conducted such as for a dangerous suspect or a prison escapee, local, state, and even federal agencies can issue a shelter-in-place for certain municipalities and counties of states where said suspect is believed to be. This is done for the safety of the general public and to help with manhunt efforts of local and state law enforcement. An example of this is when the Pennsylvania State Police issued shelter-in-place warnings, mainly for Monroe County, for the 48 day manhunt of Eric Frein, who shot 2 Pennsylvania State Troopers killing one of them back in 2014.

== Epidemics ==
During an epidemic or pandemic with an infectious agent posing significant risk of death or severe illness such as ebola or SARS, authorities may recommend shelter-in-place for the general population or for segments of the population at high-risk. Unlike other shelter-in-place incidents, recommendations may only be for particular at-risk populations (e.g., the elderly, the immunocompromised) and the recommended duration may be for an extended period of time (days, weeks or months). Shelter-in-place may be implemented as a strategy for suppressing or mitigating an epidemic, for reducing numbers of critically ill patients presenting at the same time and for thus reducing the impact of critical illness on health care systems and reducing the likelihood that a surge in illness will overwhelm critical care resources. Shelter-in-place may apply specifically to individuals or groups judged to be at-risk for death or serious complications if infected, and contrasts with self-isolation (voluntarily seclusion at home to prevent infecting others) and quarantine (voluntary or involuntary seclusion of individuals exposed to infection for a period to determine infection status). Shelter-in-place over extended periods in epidemics may involve significant logistical considerations including measures to safely provide food, medication and other supplies over time as well as arrangements for social and psychological support.

When the term "shelter-in-place order" was used by the authorities in the United States in responding to the outbreaks of Coronavirus disease 2019 (COVID-19) in 2020, people were not familiar with it as the term had been used in other emergency situations such as an active shooter which would require seeking a safe place to hide within the same building that the person already occupies until the situation is resolved. This caused confusion to the residents under the order on exactly what they were supposed to do. Later, the State of California used the term stay-at-home order instead. Other US states started using the new term when they announced their statewide order. Governor Andrew Cuomo of New York criticized anyone using the term "shelter in place" for his stay-at-home order as it would invoke panic due to its association with active shooting situations or nuclear wars.

== Implementation ==
Residents of an affected community might be informed that shelter in place is being implemented through the news media, Emergency Alert System, Reverse 911, warning sirens or horns, National Oceanic and Atmospheric Administration weather reports and radios, and announcements from vehicles equipped with public address systems. In the United States, facilities like nuclear power plants are required to be equipped with audio alert systems that can be heard within a 10-mile (16 km) radius.

Once a shelter in place is called, residents are expected to immediately go indoors, bring all children and animals with them, and to close and lock windows and doors. All ways in which outside materials may enter the shelter area should be eliminated, including closure of fireplace dampers, shutting off ventilation or climate control systems, and prepare an area for pets to eliminate waste that does not require allowing them outside. If told to do so via television or radio, those sheltering should seal their rooms with duct tape and plastic. Upon reaching shelter, those who were outside for a period of time seeking shelter after the shelter in place was called and who may have been exposed to chemical contaminants should remove all outer clothing, put it in a plastic bag, and wash with warm water. After an announcement that the shelter in place is over, residents should go outside and open all doors and windows to ventilate the shelter. Similar processes should be followed in cars, workplaces, or schools.

== Cases ==
- In October 2009, authorities called a shelter in place in Contra Costa County, California, after a teenager committed suicide by mixing chemicals together. Three nearby residents who were affected by the fumes were treated at a hospital, and the shelter in place order was lifted after three hours.
- On August 6, 2012, a shelter in place warning (issued on the EAS as a Civil Emergency Message) was issued in Richmond, California, due to a refinery fire at the Chevron Richmond Refinery.
- On October 29, 2012, a shelter in place warning was issued in Louisville, Kentucky, after a train carrying hazardous chemicals was derailed near Dixie Highway and Katherine Station.
- On April 19, 2013, a shelter in place order was issued in the Boston metropolitan Area as a result of the manhunt for the remaining suspect of the Boston Marathon bombing.
- On March 16, 2020, a shelter in place warning was issued in San Francisco, California and the surrounding Bay Area, to slow the spread of the COVID-19 pandemic in California. The order was the first in California and soon thereafter other states in the United States, as well as many areas in countries throughout the world, gave shelter in place orders. The San Francisco Bay Area's shelter in place order was seen as a proactive measure that had a significant effect with 'flattening the curve' of the outbreak in the area. California, and Washington State, who also gave early warnings, were viewed as important bellwethers for modeling the spread of the virus if strict social distancing, non-essential business shutdowns, and stay at home orders were in effect.
- On December 8, 2020, a shelter in place warning was issued in Kanawha County, West Virginia, after an explosion at a chemical plant in Belle, West Virginia. The warning included any residents within a 2-mile-radius of Belle and stayed in effect until 2:30 a.m. EST on December 9.
- On November 4, 2025, a shelter in place warning was issued for areas within a five-mile radius of Louisville Muhammad Ali International Airport after a UPS plane crashed.

== Emergency Alert System activation ==
The shelter in place warning issued below on September 19, 2014 was issued in response for a manhunt for a suspect responsible for the ambush of two Pennsylvania state troopers.

267 
WOUS41 KPHI 200006
SPWPHI
PAC089-201200-

URGENT - IMMEDIATE BROADCAST REQUESTED
SHELTER IN PLACE WARNING
PENNSYLVANIA STATE POLICE MOUNT HOLLY NEW JERSEY
RELAYED BY NATIONAL WEATHER SERVICE MOUNT HOLLY NJ
806 PM EDT FRI SEP 19 2014

THE FOLLOWING MESSAGE IS TRANSMITTED AT THE REQUEST OF THE
PENNSYLVANIA STATE POLICE.

THE PENNSYLVANIA STATE POLICE ARE ASKING ALL RESIDENTS OF BARRETT
AND PRICE TOWNSHIPS TO SHELTER IN PLACE IMMEDIATELY.

PLEASE DO NOT GO OUTDOORS AND REMAIN AWAY FROM WINDOWS OR OPENINGS
TO THE OUTSIDE.

PLEASE STAY TUNED TO MEDIA OUTLETS FOR FURTHER INFORMATION.

$$

== See also ==
- Centers for Disease Control
- Civil defense
- Decontamination
- Duck and Cover
- Evacuation
- Ex-Rad
- Mobile Emergency Alert System
- NBC suit
- Portable oxygen concentrator
- Potassium iodide
- Stay-at-home order
