= WRJZ =

- Knoxville, Tennessee; United States
- Broadcast area: Knoxville metropolitan area
- Frequency: 620 kHz
- Branding: Joy 620 WRJZ

Programming
- Format: Christian radio

Ownership
- Owner: Thomas Moffit, Jr.; (Tennessee Media Associates)
- Sister stations: WETR

History
- First air date: February 12, 1927

Technical information
- Licensing authority: FCC
- Facility ID: 65209
- Class: B
- Power: 5,000 watts
- Transmitter coordinates: 35°59′24″N 83°50′15″W
- Translators: 99.5 W258DB (Sevierville); 102.5 W273DX (Knoxville)

Links
- Public license information: Public file; LMS
- Webcast: Listen live
- Website: wrjz.com

WRJZ (620 AM) is a commercial radio station licensed to Knoxville, Tennessee, United States, serving the Knoxville metropolitan area. It airs a Christian radio format and is owned by Tennessee Media Associates, headed by Thomas Moffit, Jr. The studios are on East Magnolia Avenue in Knoxville.

Programming is also heard on two FM translators: 99.5 MHz in Sevierville and 102.5 MHz in Knoxville.

== History ==
WRJZ is one of Knoxville's oldest radio stations. It signed on the air on February 12, 1927. The original call sign was WNBJ. It was owned by Lonsdale Baptist Church and it broadcast on 1450 kilocycles. It moved to 1310 AM in 1930 under new owner Stewart Broadcasting Corporation. A year later, Stuart changed the call letters to WROL. It moved to its current frequency in 1941.

The station's ownership group was part of a consortium that signed on East Tennessee's first television station, WROL-TV, in 1953 on channel 6. Two years later, the call letters were changed to WATE AM-TV.

The two stations went their separate ways in 1971, with the television station retaining the WATE-TV calls while the radio station changed its calls to WETE. The station aired an adult contemporary format for most of the 1960s and 1970s. In 1976, WETE-AM changed the call letters to WRJZ-AM, and began airing a top 40 format.

CP and Walker, Jeff Jarnigan, Adele (see below), Mark Thompson, Rick Kirk, John Boy, and J.J. Scott were some of the station's best-known personalities throughout the 1970s.

Adele Arakawa, the first female DJ in Knoxville, worked at WRJZ broadcasting Top 40 music for 5 years in the late 1970s.

Other DJs from WRJZ's late 1970s Top 40 era who became well-known were "John Boy" Isley, later of the "John-Boy and Billy Big Show" in Charlotte, NC. and Mark Thompson, later of "Mark and Brian", the FM drive team who have been on 95.5 KLOS for 20-plus years.

After several years as a popular Top 40 station but losing market share to FM station WOKI, WRJZ briefly switched to an adult contemporary format in 1981, then shortly thereafter to a country music format, then an oldies format, then shortly thereafter went dark entirely only to return to the air during the 1980s with a Christian talk format under the new slogan "Joy 62".

== Programming ==
Bob Bell hosts the station's morning program; Christian preachers make up the remainder of WRJZ's broadcast day. WRJZ also airs Carson-Newman College and Grace Christian Academy football games.
