= Brain Game (1997 game show) =

Raleigh quizbowl television show

Brain Game is a weekly quiz bowl-type show for high school students that airs on NBC affiliate WRAL-TV in Raleigh, North Carolina. The program debuted January 11, 1997, when WRAL-TV was a CBS affiliate. It currently airs at 11 a.m. on Saturdays, and the current host is former WRAL traffic reporter Mark Roberts. Early programs were hosted by WRAL weathercaster Greg Fishel.

== Rules ==
Each Brain Game show is contested by three teams of three players each. Teams may buzz in and attempt to answer at any time while the question is being read. Team members may confer with one another prior to answering. Academic-based questions in the games come from the standard North Carolina curriculum for ninth and tenth graders.

Prior to fall 2008, the teams with the nine best scores advanced to a playoff of three semifinal games, with the winners advancing to a championship game. Teams could advance to the semifinals without winning their regular season games - only the score accumulated during the regular season game determined the playoff teams.

In the fall of 2008, the rules were changed so that the winners of each game would automatically advance to the playoffs. The best non-winning high score qualified a team as a "wild card" in the playoffs.

The format used in Brain Game differs from other quiz bowl formats in some ways:

- Brain Game allows three players to compete at a time, other formats permit four players
- Regardless of who buzzes in on a team, anyone on the team may answer the question
- Three teams compete at a time, other formats have two teams compete at a time
- Brain game includes audio or visual clues via monitors visible to contestants

Starting in 2009, regular-season matches were played with three teams competing. The top 6 teams advance to the playoffs, which have two teams competing. The winners of the three head-to-head matches in the first round advance to the second round, along with the highest scoring losing team, leaving four teams. At this point, a champion is chosen based on single-elimination rules.

== Format and Segments ==
Brain Game shows consist of the following segments:

- Pop-Up Culture
  - 10 questions about pop culture, worth twenty points up or down
- Headliners
  - 10 questions about current events, worth twenty points up or down
- Word Power
  - teams buzz in to fill in a crossword puzzle based on clues, worth twenty points up or down
- Arts and Crafts
  - ten questions about art, culture, literature, and music, worth twenty points up or down
- Name Game
  - each team gets thirty seconds to answer five questions (directed to one team at a time), worth ten points up or down. If a team gets all five questions correct, they receive a twenty-point bonus
- Crunching Numbers
  - five math questions, worth twenty points up or down
- Rocket Science
  - ten questions about science, worth twenty points up or down
- Globetrotting
  - ten questions about an area of the world that varies from show to show, worth twenty points up or down. On the last question of this category, all teams will wager 1-100 points and write down their answers. Each team will gain or lose the number of points they wagered based on whether or not they answer correctly.
- Note that the players know beforehand what areas of the world and of the United States will be covered in the Globetrotting round.

== Participants and Winners ==
Most teams that participate in Brain Game come from the WRAL-TV viewing area.

=== Recent Champions ===
The schedule switched from semesters to school years beginning in 2009-2010 season.

Season	Winner	Location
Fall 2004	Enloe	Raleigh
Spring 2005	Leesville Road	Raleigh
Fall 2005	Terry Sanford	Fayetteville
Spring 2006	Terry Sanford	Fayetteville
Fall 2006	Grimsley	Greensboro
Spring 2007	Person	Roxboro
Fall 2007	Raleigh Charter	Raleigh
Spring 2008	Raleigh Charter	Raleigh
Fall 2008	Enloe	Raleigh
Spring 2009	Grimsley	Greensboro
Spring 2010	Enloe	Raleigh
Spring 2011	School of Science and Math	Durham
Spring 2012	Green Hope High School	Cary
Spring 2013	School of Science and Math	Durham
Spring 2014	Millbrook High School	Raleigh
Spring 2015	Enloe High School	Raleigh
