= WETR =

Knoxville, Tennessee; United States
- Broadcast area: Knoxville metropolitan area
- Frequency: 760 kHz
- Branding: Talk Radio 92.3 and AM 760

Programming
- Format: Conservative talk
- Affiliations: Fox News Radio

Ownership
- Owner: Thomas Moffit Jr.
- Sister stations: WRJZ

History
- First air date: August 14, 1995
- Former call signs: WKNL (1988–1995); WMEN (1995–2004)
- Call sign meaning: East Tennessee Talk Radio

Technical information
- Licensing authority: FCC
- Facility ID: 65205
- Class: D
- Power: 2,400 watts (days only)
- Transmitter coordinates: 35°59′18.00″N 83°50′35.00″W
- Translator: 92.3 W222BA (Karns)

Links
- Public license information: Public file; LMS
- Webcast: Listen live
- Website: talkradio923.com

WETR (760 AM) is a commercial radio station licensed to Knoxville, Tennessee, United States, that operates during the daytime hours only. Owned by Thomas Moffit, Jr., it features a conservative talk format. Studios are located on East Magnolia Avenue in Knoxville.

Programming is heard around the clock on low-power FM translator W222BA at 92.3 MHz in Karns, Tennessee, operating with a smaller coverage area.

== History ==
The station signed on the air on August 14, 1995, as WMEN. It was known as "The Spirit of 76" and was an affiliate of Morningstar Radio Network.

Later, WMEN was called "The Word." It had a Christian radio format and shared production facilities with WRJZ 620 AM, its sister station.

WETR previously featured a local morning program called “Real News” with host Grant Henry and co-host Nick Crawford. Both left the station in 2019.

The wake-up show was re-branded as “Knoxville’s Morning News,” featuring hosts Daniel Herrera and Elaine Davis. The show was produced by Rachel “Roz” Adams. Local morning drive time programming ended on January 10, 2020, when the station switched to all nationally syndicated shows on weekdays and most of the weekend.

For the 2019 season, WETR was the flagship station for the Tennessee Smokies minor league baseball radio network.
