= North Durham County Prison Camp =

Historic building in North Carolina, US

- North Durham County Prison Camp (Former)
- U.S. National Register of Historic Places
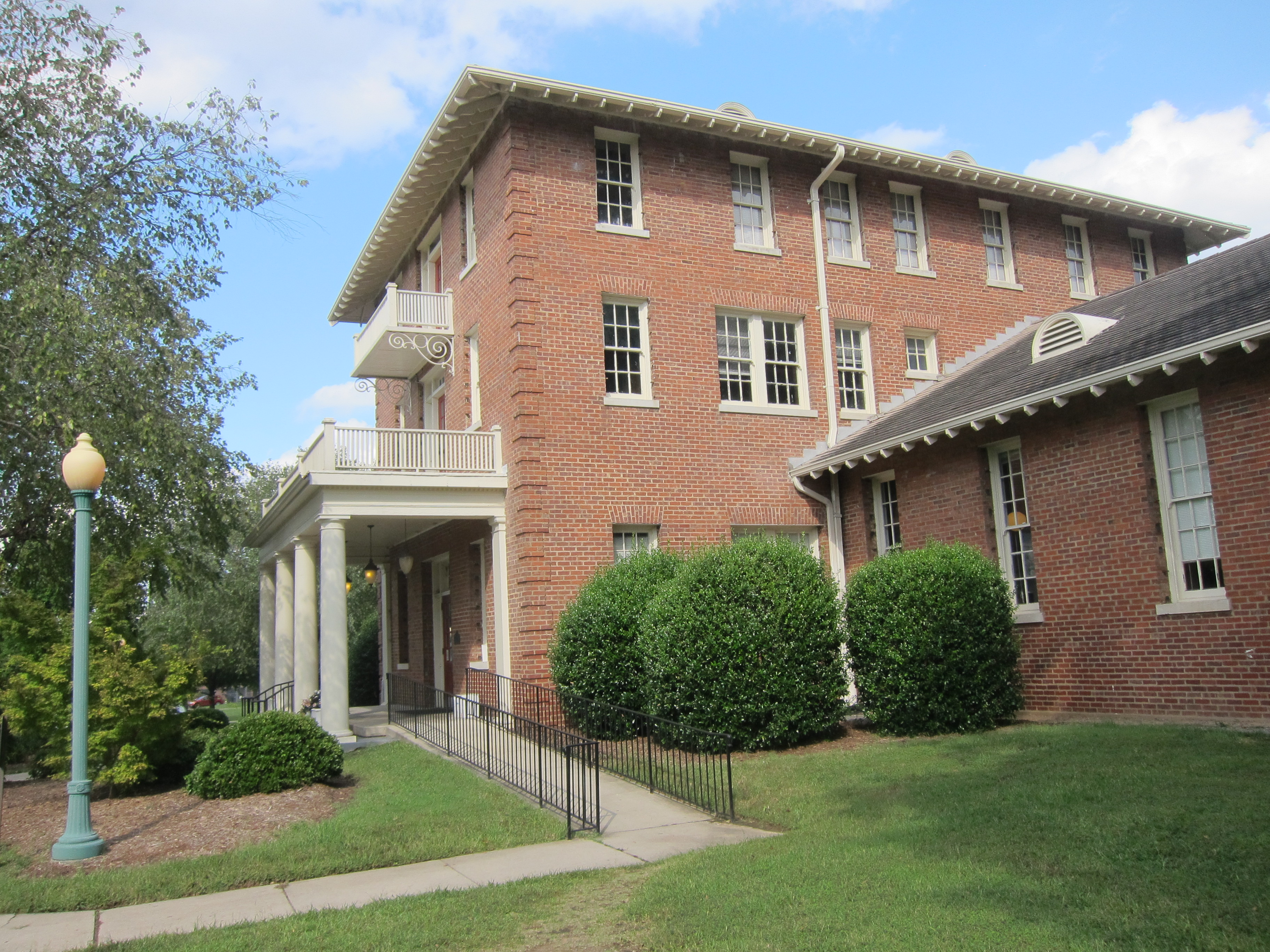

- Location within North Carolina Location within the United States
- Location: 2410 Broad St. Durham, North Carolina
- Coordinates: 36°1′54″N 78°54′37″W
- Area: 3.7 acres (1.5 ha)
- Built: 1925, 1944
- Architect: G. Murray Nelson
- Architectural style: Colonial Revival, Italianate
- NRHP reference No.: 98001573
- Added to NRHP: December 31, 1998

North Durham County Prison Camp, also known as Durham County Tuberculosis Sanatorium, is a historic prison and sanatorium located at Durham, Durham County, North Carolina. It was built in 1925, and is a three-story, T-shaped, Italianate style brick building. The building measures 232 feet long and has 17,000 square feet of floorspace. It features a three-bay, Tuscan order portico in the Colonial Revival style. The building was originally constructed to serve as a prison facility. It housed a prison between 1925 and 1938, was converted for use as a tuberculosis sanatorium beginning in 1944 and continued this function until 1953. It then housed WTVD Television Corporation until 1979.

It was listed on the National Register of Historic Places in 1998.
