= Scott Mason (journalist) =

American journalist

- Occupation: Journalist
- Years active: 1984-present
- Known for: Tar Heel Traveler

Scott Mason is an American author, reporter for WRAL-TV and host of the Southeast Emmy award-winning Tarheel Traveler since 2007. Mason authored Tar Heel Traveler Eats: Food Journeys across North Carolina in 2014. and Tar heel traveler : journeys across North Carolina. in 2013.

Before joining WRAL, he served as news director at WCVE-TV, Richmond, Va. from 1988 to 1990 where his Virginia Currents documentary series won more than 100 awards for journalistic excellence catching the attention of WRAL. He was news bureau chief at WHIO-TV in Dayton, Ohio from 1986 to 1988, a reporter at WXII-TV in Winston-Salem, N.C. from 1984 to 1985 and a reporter at WTVC-TV in Chattanooga, Tennessee.

Scott’s success caught the attention of WRAL-TV, the CBS affiliate in Raleigh, North Carolina. In April, 1997, Scott became the station’s Documentary Producer. He researched, wrote, and produced nine documentaries before adding his talents to the nightly news team as a reporter specializing in features.

Mason is a 1984 graduate of Washington and Lee University, where he majored in Journalism and Communications. He lives in Raleigh with his wife Nina, daughters Lane and Genie, and son Scout.

== Awards ==
- Southeast Emmy Awards
  - 2000 Documentary The Cape Light 14 2/5/2000
  - 2001 Public Affairs Upon This Rock
  - 2003 News Series / Hard News Pentagon Stories
  - 2006 Writer/News Stories
  - 2009 Light Feature News Report Devil's Tramping Ground
  - 2009 Magazine Program Tar Heel Traveler
  - 2009 Serious Feature News Report Marty
  - 2009 Writer/News Scott Mason Composite
  - 2010 Magazine Series Tar Heel Traveler #8
  - 2012 Light Feature News Report Birthday Card
  - 2013 News Writing
  - 2014 Light Feature News Series Tar Heel Traveler New Year's Eve Drops
  - 2014 Magazine Program Tar Heel Traveler
- Edward R. Murrow Award
  - 2015 Writing
- North Carolina Television Reporter of the Year
  - 2004
  - 2005
