= Rick Gall =

Rick Gall is the news director for WRAL-TV in Raleigh, North Carolina, a position he has held since 2005.

== Awards ==
Gall was named News Director of the Year in 2011 by the Radio Television Digital News Association of the Carolinas and also received the 2011 Mid South Emmy Award for News Excellence.
