= Ray Reeve =

American broadcaster (1901–1980)

Ray Reeve (1901–1980) was a pioneering American radio and television sports commentator.

== Career ==
Ray Reeve was a sports broadcaster who worked for WRAL-AM and FM, the Tobacco Sports Network and WRAL-TV during a career that spanned five decades.

He is best known as the first voice of Atlantic Coast Conference basketball over the Tobacco Sports Network—a radio network formed by Capitol Broadcasting Company in 1948 to carry the region's collegiate games.

Reeve's distinct play-by-play style and raspy voice endeared him to listeners throughout the ACC region. Sports historians credit the early growth of the league in part to Reeve's compelling basketball broadcasts.

As the ACC evolved, Reeve narrowed his broadcasts to NC State athletics. He gained widespread popularity as the voice of Wolfpack basketball and football during the eras of Coaches Everett Case and Earle Edwards.

When WRAL-TV signed on the air in 1956, Reeve was its first sports director and sports anchor – roles he maintained until his retirement in 1973.

During his early years at WRAL-TV Reeve was the original host of All-Star Wrestling, which later became Mid-Atlantic Championship Wrestling. He hosted the wildly popular shows in the late 50s and early 60s as they were recorded before a live audience in WRAL-TV's Studio A. Reeve later turned the hosting duties over to an up-and-coming WRAL sportscaster–Nick Pond.

In its on-air and print promotion, WRAL-TV referred to Ray Reeve as the “Dean of Sportscasters,” and it turns out his contemporaries agreed. In 1967 Reeve was elected to the NC Sports Hall of Fame—becoming the first broadcaster to be so honored.

Reeve was a graduate of Dartmouth College. He died in 1980. He was long association with Tobacco Sports Network and WRAL-TV. He made radio broadcasts of early ACC games in 1950s carried the league to millions of listeners across the eastern seaboard. He was a graduate of Dartmouth College.

== Awards ==
Elected into the North Carolina Sports Hall of Fame in 1967, he was the first broadcaster to receive this honor.
