= Bobbie Battista =

American journalist (1952–2020)

- Born: Barbara Ann Nusser; July 23, 1952; Iowa City, Iowa, U.S.
- Died: March 3, 2020 (aged 67); Davenport, Iowa, U.S.
- Education: Northwestern University (BS)
- Years active: 1975–2020
- Spouse: John Brimelow (m. 1995)

Barbara Ann "Bobbie" Battista (July 23, 1952 – March 3, 2020) was an American journalist and a prominent newscaster on CNN. During her 20-year career with the cable news company, Battista anchored numerous programs on CNN, CNN Headline News, and CNN International.

== Education ==
Born Barbara Ann Nusser, Battista earned a bachelor's degree in radio, television, and film production at Northwestern University in 1974.

== Career ==
After beginning her career at a radio station in Raleigh, North Carolina, she moved on to be an anchor, reporter and producer with WRAL-TV; she was the writer and assistant producer for the 1981 documentary Fed up with Fear, which won a Peabody Award. On November 17, 2006, Battista returned to WRAL to co-anchor a special "reunion" newscast celebrating the station's 50th anniversary.

With CNN, Battista was one of the original anchors on the CNN Headline News station, and then moved to the main network in 1988, where she served as host of numerous daily and regularly scheduled shows as well as handling anchor and reporting duties. She anchored CNN WorldDay, CNN NewsDay, CNN NewsHour, CNN Daybreak (during the Gulf War), CNN PrimeNews, and CNN WorldNews. During that time, she also reported on historic events including the fall of the Berlin Wall, the Space Shuttle Challenger disaster, the Gulf War, the US Air Flight 427 crash and the September 11 attacks. Battista also hosted a regular program CNNI World News (1600 CET) on the CNN International network since 1992, when CNN/US show CNN WorldDay was canceled due to expanding of CNN Morning News. Her unique style was often parodied on Saturday Night Live, MADtv and Australian sketch comedy show Fast Forward. She was also very popular in Eastern Europe, especially in Poland, Czechoslovakia and Germany, while she anchored HLN.

In 1998, Battista was named as the host of the first multi-platform interactive talk show, TalkBack Live, which ran for an hour on weekday afternoons. Battista left CNN after the merger of CNN's parent company, Time Warner, with America Online in 2001. She joined her husband John Brimelow's firm, Atamira Communications, and provided strategic counsel to a wide range of Fortune 500 companies. Battista remained active in television and was a member of the American Federation of Television and Radio Artists (AFTRA).

In 2009, Battista made periodic, part-time contributions to ONN; the Onion News Network, her first report was released in February 2009.

Battista, who lived in Atlanta, Georgia, was also in the process of starting a new video production company focusing on reality television programming. In 2014, Battista began hosting "On the Story" on Georgia Public Broadcasting.

== Awards ==
While employed at CNN, Battista was recognized with a number of awards. She wrote and produced a series on youth crime involving five stations, and was the recipient of a Peabody Award for her efforts. She was also nominated for an On Cable magazine award for Outstanding News Personality in 1984. In 1986 she was voted Cable Guide's best newscaster, and in 1995 she was nominated for a CableACE Award.

== Personal life ==
Battista was married to John Brimelow and had a stepdaughter.

She died of cervical cancer on March 3, 2020, at the age of 67.
