= Adele Arakawa =

American evening news anchor

- Born: Adele Hausser; August 31, 1957 (age 69)
- Spouse: Barry Tiller (m. 1977)
- Children: 1

Adele Arakawa (born August 31, 1957) is a retired American evening news anchor for NBC affiliate station KUSA-TV of Denver, Colorado. As of June 2007, she provides the female voice of the airport train system at Denver International Airport. She retired on June 30, 2017. She is also the former voice of the Denver International Airport Automated Guideway Transit System.

== Early life and education ==
Born Adele Hausser, Arakawa was raised in Hawaii and later east Tennessee. At age 16, she began taking college courses at Tennessee Tech University and working as a radio disc jockey in her hometown of La Follette, Tennessee. She also attended the University of Tennessee but dropped out after her freshman year.

== Professional career ==
Following her entry into radio, Arakawa worked as a radio news anchor at WYSH in Clinton, Tennessee and as a disc jockey at WRJZ in Knoxville, Tennessee.

In 1981, Arakawa made the transition to television news, working at WTVK (now WVLT-TV) in weather in Knoxville where she began using her mother's maiden name, Arakawa, at the suggestion of news director Hal Wanzer. Two years later, she moved to Raleigh, North Carolina to coanchor weekday evening newscasts for WRAL-TV with Charlie Gaddy and weatherman Bob Debardelaben.

Arakawa's career next took the family to Chicago in 1989, where she again anchored weekday evening newscasts, this time for CBS O&O WBBM-TV.

In 1993, she became a weekday evening newscast anchor for KUSA-TV in Denver. On December 6, 2016, she announced her retirement after 40 years in broadcasting. Her last day was June 30, 2017.

Arakawa was president of the Asian American Journalists Association in 1992 in Chicago and is a member of both the Japanese American Citizens League and the Japanese American Service Committee. Two of her grandparents were from Okinawa, Japan.

== Personal life ==
Arakawa married her husband, Barry Tiller, in July 1977. Since retiring, she has lived in Tucson, Arizona.

Arakawa used to race cars competitively, and as of her retirement was still driving a race car on a road course.

== Awards ==
- 1992: National Award, Asian American Issues (Television), Asian American Journalists Association
- 1997: Best News Anchor, Heartland Chapter, National Television Academy
- 1999: Best News Anchor, Heartland Chapter, National Television Academy
- 2001: Outstanding Daily Newscast, Markets 1-50 (with team), Heartland Chapter, National Television Academy

Best Interview / Discussion Program (with team), Heartland Chapter, National Television Academy

- 2004: Best News Anchor (tie), Heartland Chapter, National Television Academy
