= Greg Fishel =

American meteorologist

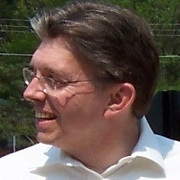
- Born: February 19, 1957 (age 69); Lancaster, Pennsylvania
- Occupation: Meteorologist

Greg Fishel (born February 19, 1957) is a former meteorologist for WRAL-TV in Raleigh, North Carolina. He received his B.S. in Meteorology from Pennsylvania State University in 1979.

Fishel began his broadcast meteorology career in 1979 with WMDT in Salisbury, Maryland. He joined WRAL in 1981, and became the station's chief meteorologist in 1989. He resigned from the WRAL News Team in February 2019. In late 2019, Fishel joined Priogen Energy, an Amsterdam-based energy company, as an atmospheric scientist.

Through most of his career, Fishel held a view on climate change in opposition to the climate consensus. However, he began researching the matter in 2005, and by 2015 he participated in a climate documentary. In his last five years with WRAL, Fishel would make strong anti-denialist statements on climate change.

Greg Fishel initially retired to Myrtle Beach, SC, but has since returned to Raleigh. He does daily weather reports that he publishes to Facebook, with more exclusive content for subscribers on Patreon.

== Awards and recognition ==
- American Meteorological Society Fellow
