= WRAL-TV =

Television station in Raleigh, North Carolina

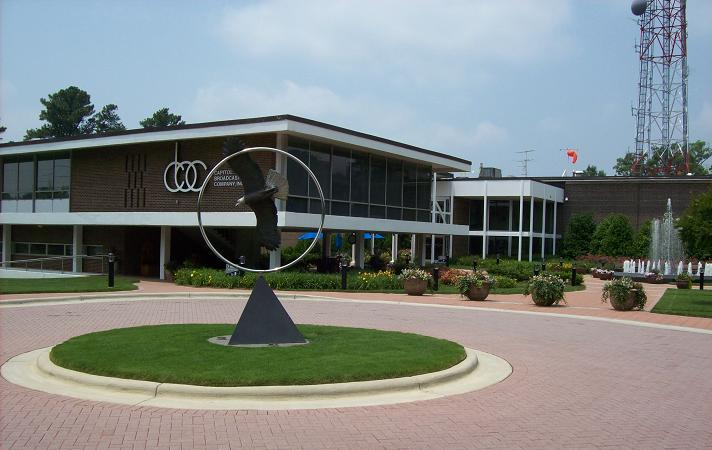
- Raleigh–Durham–; Fayetteville, North Carolina; United States
- City: Raleigh, North Carolina
- Channels: Digital: 17 (UHF); Virtual: 5
- Branding: WRAL-TV 5; WRAL News

Programming
- Affiliations: 5.1: NBC; for others, see § Subchannels

Ownership
- Owner: Capitol Broadcasting Company, Inc.
- Sister stations: WCMC-FM; WDNC; WRAL; WRAZ; WNGT-CD

History
- First air date: December 15, 1956
- Former channel numbers: Analog: 5 (VHF, 1956–2009); Digital: 32 (UHF, 1996–2000), 53 (UHF, 2000–2009), 48 (UHF, 2009–2019)
- Former affiliations: NBC (1956–1962); ABC (secondary 1957–1962, primary 1962–1985); CBS (1985–2016)
- Call sign meaning: Raleigh

Technical information
- Licensing authority: FCC
- Facility ID: 8688
- ERP: 833.7 kW
- HAAT: 625 m (2,051 ft)
- Transmitter coordinates: 35°40′29″N 78°31′39″W

Links
- Public license information: Public file; LMS
- Website: www.wral.com

WRAL-TV (channel 5) is a television station licensed to Raleigh, North Carolina, United States, serving as the NBC affiliate for the Research Triangle area. It is the flagship station of the locally based Capitol Broadcasting Company, which has owned the station since its inception.

It is a sister station to Fox affiliate WRAZ (channel 50, also licensed to Raleigh), Class A news-formatted independent station WNGT-CD (channel 34, licensed to both Smithfield and Selma), and radio stations WRAL (101.5 FM), WCMC-FM (99.9), and WDNC (620 AM). The television stations share studios at Capitol Broadcasting Company headquarters on Western Boulevard in west Raleigh; WRAL-TV's transmitter is located in Auburn, North Carolina.

The station has been affiliated with NBC since February 29, 2016, when it ended a 30-year affiliation with CBS, with CBS going to Goldsboro-licensed WNCN (channel 17) on that date. This is channel 5's second stint with NBC; it was a primary affiliate with that network for six years at the station's inception.

== History ==
=== Early years ===
WRAL-TV began broadcasting on December 15, 1956. Among the first programs aired was the movie Miracle on 34th Street. A. J. Fletcher's Capitol Broadcasting Company, which first licensed WRAL Radio (AM 1240, now WPJL) in 1938, won the TV license in an upset over the much larger Durham Life Insurance Company, then-owners of radio station WPTF.

WRAL was originally an NBC affiliate, taking that network from Durham-based WTVD (channel 11, which included Fletcher's son, Floyd, among its founders). When WNAO-TV (channel 28), the Triangle's CBS affiliate, went dark at the end of 1957 and the affiliation moved to WTVD (which was an ABC affiliate at that point) in the process, WRAL shared ABC with WTVD until August 1, 1962, when channel 5 took the ABC affiliation full-time. This was unusual for a two-station market. ABC was at the time the smallest and weakest of the three major networks; it would not be on par with NBC and CBS in terms of ratings or affiliated stations until the early 1970s. WRAL did, however, continue to carry The Huntley–Brinkley Report until January 3, 1967, when ABC's own evening newscasts expanded to 30 minutes. WRAL also continued to carry My Three Sons for several years after that show switched networks, from ABC to CBS.

From 1960 until his election to the United States Senate in 1972, Jesse Helms was an editorialist on WRAL-TV's news broadcasts; by the early 1970s, the editorials were running for 10 minutes every weeknight. Helms' conservative commentaries were both controversial and popular with many viewers.

=== Switch to CBS ===
In March 1985, WTVD's owner, Capital Cities Communications, purchased ABC, resulting in WTVD becoming an owned-and-operated station of that network. The CBS affiliation moved to WRAL-TV on August 4, 1985. Within six months of the switch, WRAL-TV had become one of the strongest CBS affiliates in the country. It is one of the few stations in the country to have been a primary affiliate of all of the "Big Three" networks.

In December 1989, WRAL was knocked off the air when a severe ice storm caused the collapse of the station's 2,000-foot (610 m) transmitter tower. Within hours, channel 5 cut a deal with the then-struggling Fayetteville independent station WKFT-TV (channel 40, now Univision O&O WUVC-DT), allowing WRAL to return to the air in only three hours. WKFT ran the entire WRAL schedule during this time. The station's new, stronger tower was activated on October 25, 1990, at which point WKFT reverted to broadcasting its own programming.

In the early 1990s, WRAL distributed its programming via C-Band satellite as part of the Primetime 24 package, reaching viewers in the Caribbean and Latin America, as well as the few rural areas of the United States and Canada where local over-the-air broadcast signals were not available. It was replaced in the late 1990s with fellow CBS affiliate WSEE-TV from Erie, Pennsylvania, primarily because of WRAL's preemptions of network programming due to ACC basketball games, which were (and still are) a highly-popular audience draw in North Carolina.

=== Return to NBC ===
On January 15, 2016, WRAL-TV announced that it would switch back to NBC on February 29, 2016. Concurrently, CBS announced that the existing NBC station, Media General-owned and Goldsboro-licensed WNCN (channel 17), would replace WRAL-TV as the Triangle's CBS affiliate the same day. Capitol Broadcasting president and CEO Jim Goodmon stated that CBS would only renew its affiliation with WRAL if it entered into a reverse compensation agreement—under which Capitol would be required to pay the network for the local rights to air its programming, the complete opposite of traditional commercial television practices. NBC, on the other hand, took the line that an affiliation deal was a partnership. Goodmon saw the switch to NBC as "a business decision for the future." The last CBS program to air on WRAL was a showing of the movie Last Vegas at 9 p.m. Eastern Time.

WRAL officially rejoined NBC at 7 a.m. on February 29. In a ceremony at the end of the morning newscast, Goodmon pressed a button decorated with the NBC peacock to switch back to Today.

Meredith College professor Doug Spero suggested that WRAL's overall dominance in the Triangle was so absolute that it was in a position to become one of NBC's strongest affiliates, much as it was one of CBS' strongest affiliates. The feeling was mutual; according to NBC News correspondent Harry Smith, NBC officials felt like they had "just won the lottery" when they learned WRAL was rejoining NBC. Indeed, on the first day of WRAL's return to NBC, several dayparts saw NBC jump from third to first in the Triangle ratings at one stroke. Notably, Today, the NBC Nightly News, and The Tonight Show Starring Jimmy Fallon immediately saw major ratings gains in the market after their move to WRAL. The former two shows tallied their highest ratings on record in the Triangle on the day channel 5 officially returned to NBC, showing gains of well over 200 percent compared to their previous showings on WNCN. By contrast, CBS' competing programs lost more than half their audience share, falling from first to third in one stroke. NBC had struggled in the Triangle ratings for more than 40 years, dating to when it was all but forced to move its programming full-time to WRDU-TV (channel 28, later WPTF-TV and now WRDC) in 1971. While NBC's performance in the area improved somewhat after it moved to WNCN in 1995, that station had remained stubbornly in third place for most of its 20-year run with the network.

The delay in the affiliation switch kept CBS's coverage of Super Bowl 50, which featured the Carolina Panthers (based in nearby Charlotte) as champions of the National Football Conference, on WRAL-TV. As an NBC station, channel 5 carried the 2016 Stanley Cup Finals and the 2016 Summer Olympics in Rio de Janeiro, Brazil, making it the only television station in the United States to air all three events from different networks in the same year.

== Programming ==
WRAL clears most of the NBC schedule in pattern, except for one hour of The More You Know (NBC's E/I-compliant block), which it preempts in favor of paid programming in the noon hour on Saturdays (as a CBS affiliate, it cleared the network's entire schedule from the late 1990s until it rejoined NBC). The only exceptions involved ACC football and basketball from Raycom Sports, both of which aired on the station from 1977, when they moved from WTVD, until the end of the syndication package in 2019. ACC-preempted NBC programming aired either as originally scheduled on digital subchannel 5.2 (which is otherwise an affiliate of Cozi TV) or overnights on the main signal. The More You Know is split over two days; the first hour airs on Saturdays from 10 to 11 a.m., with Brain Game and Smart Start Kids (both of which count toward WRAL's E/I commitments) airing from 11 a.m. to noon, and the second hour airs on Sundays from 11 a.m. to noon.

However, the 2003 reality show Cupid did not air on the station, as have some controversial shows on sister station WRAZ, and WRAL was one of a few CBS affiliates in the nation that did not carry an hour of CBS' weekend morning children's programming block (in favor of Brain Game and Smart Start Kids). WRAL was also one of the few CBS affiliates that aired The Young and the Restless at 4 p.m. as a lead-in to its 5 p.m. newscast. Most CBS stations in the Eastern Time Zone air Y&R at 12:30 p.m. (CBS' recommended time for the show), but in the case of WRAL, the timeslot switch occurred in January 1993. This happened because the station's sitcom reruns (the show being run at the time was an hour-long block of The Golden Girls, making it ironic that during their ABC affiliation they were one of 13 affiliates not to carry the original network run of Soap, another Witt/Thomas/Harris Production) were having no luck against The Oprah Winfrey Show on WTVD. (The second half of their noon newscast and Right This Minute aired in Y&R's recommended time slot.) Following WRAL-TV rejoining NBC on February 29, 2016, Y&R continued to air at 4 p.m. on WNCN while WRAL-TV carried local news at the time slot until January 17, 2022, when WNCN moved it to its traditional 12:30 p.m. timeslot and introduced its own 4 p.m. newscast.

When WRAL joined CBS in 1985, it became the Triangle's home for the NCAA Division I men's basketball tournament, which has aired on CBS since 1981. Due to the Triangle's (and North Carolina's) longstanding status as a college basketball hotbed and local teams North Carolina and Duke being fixtures in the tournament, NCAA Tournament games on WRAL were consistently among the highest-rated programs in the Triangle during tournament season. WRAL aired the Tar Heels' national championship wins in 1993, 2005, and 2009; five of the Tar Heels' other Final Four appearances in 1995, 1997, 1998, 2000, and 2008; all five of the Blue Devils' national championship victories in 1991, 1992, 2001, 2010, and 2015; four of the Blue Devils' other national championship appearances in 1986, 1990, 1994, and 1999; and three of the Blue Devils' other Final Four appearances in 1988, 1989, and 2004. Despite the NCAA Tournament moving with the rest of the CBS schedule to WNCN, WRAL-TV continued to air ACC football and/or basketball until the package ended in 2019 in favor of the ACC Network. WRAL-TV may potentially air any away games of the local ACC teams if the opposing home team is from the Big Ten, Atlantic-10 or Big East conferences.

WRAL has broadcast memorable locally produced children's programming throughout its storied history. Its most famous and longest-running is Time for Uncle Paul, which ran from 1961 to 1981, and starred Paul Montgomery. He had played various other characters on other local shows before getting his own program. He voluntarily ended his program after station management suggested a change to an educational format.

Soon after, WRAL continued to produce acclaimed educational children's shows such as Frog Hollow, Sparks, and The Androgena Show. Today, WRAL continues to produce educational programs with such shows as Smart Start Kids and Brain Game. In recent years, WRAL and UNC-TV have co-produced programming, such as the 2009 Gubernatorial Inauguration and the 2006 Parade of Sail Tall Ship Show in Beaufort. UNC-TV has, also, begun carrying WRAL's award-winning Focal Point documentaries. WRAL has long been a corporate supporter of UNC-TV, often assisting them financially and occasionally with on-air talent during UNC-TV's pledge drives.

WRAL announced on February 1, 2006, that it would begin to stream all of its programming live on the internet. This signified the latest advances in technology-driven delivery of product by a local television station. A few months later, WRAL was selected to be the flagship station for North Carolina Education Lottery drawings (twice daily for certain games, with the multi-jurisdictional Mega Millions Tuesday and Friday nights, and Powerball Wednesdays and Saturdays). On December 3, 2007, WRAL became the first local television station to stream live video to mobile phones.

=== Football Friday ===
Debuting in 1981, each Friday evening following the 11 p.m. news, Tom Suiter hosts Football Friday covering all high school football games throughout Wake and Durham counties along with a dozen or more counties. WRAL crews spread out across the area providing not just scores but video coverage of each of 25 to as many as 35 games in the area. The show is an extension of the expansion throughout the 1980s of high school football coverage on the 11 p.m. newscast. Each Friday, video crews are sent to cover two games each. WRAL videographers and sports reporters capture highlights of the first quarter of one game and second quarter of the other game. Editors have little more than an hour to prepare highlights. From 1995 through 2002, Football Friday was broadcast from WRAL's Studio A with an audience of cheerleaders, bands, players and fans. The arrival of the North Carolina Education Lottery moved the show to the newsroom.

=== News operation ===
WRAL-TV presently broadcasts 42 hours of locally produced newscasts each week (with seven hours each weekday, three hours on Saturdays and four hours on Sundays). WRAL has the highest rated television news organization in the Triangle winning numerous regional Emmys. Most recently, WRAL and wral.com were nominated 29 times for Mid-South Regional Emmys.

Until his retirement on July 1, 1994, Charlie Gaddy co-anchored newscasts alongside Bobbie Battista, Adele Arakawa (now with KUSA-TV in Denver), Donna Gregory (who now works for WWAY in Wilmington), and Pam Saulsby (formerly of WTVJ in Miami). From 1994 to 2022, David Crabtree (formerly of KCNC-TV and KMGH-TV in Denver, WITN-TV in Washington, North Carolina, and WKRN-TV in Nashville) and Debra Morgan were part of the longest-running on-air news team (news, weather, and sports) in the Triangle and one of the longest-running news teams in the state. Long time sports anchor Tom Suiter retired on December 18, 2008, and was replaced by Jeff Gravely, also a sports reporter and anchor for the 10 p.m. news on WRAZ. Jeff Gravely retired from WRAL, and Chris Lea (formerly of WXII in Winston-Salem) became the sports anchor in 2020.

In September 1995, WRAL began to produce newscasts for WRAZ. That station usually simulcasts local breaking news coverage from WRAL. For national breaking news events, WRAZ carries Fox News coverage, while WRAL carries coverage from NBC News. Otherwise, WRAZ may broadcast NBC programming in case WRAL cannot do so as in news-related emergencies. The WRAZ broadcasts include a three-hour newscast at 7 a.m. weekday mornings and a weeknight hour-long, weekend half-hour newscast at 10 p.m., seven nights a week. WRAZ previously aired a 4 p.m. newscast on weekdays; however that newscast moved to WRAL on February 29, 2016, replacing The Young and the Restless.

WRAL was the first commercial station to provide high definition programming when it obtained an experimental HD transmission license from the FCC in 1996. On October 13, 2000, WRAL aired the world's first all-HD newscast. On January 28, 2001, WRAL converted all of its newsgathering and broadcasts to all digital high definition (the WRAZ newscasts are broadcast in high definition as well). On November 17, 2006, WRAL had a special "reunion" newscast during the 6 p.m. broadcast with Gaddy, Battista and DeBardelaben reprising their roles once again in commemoration of the station's 50th anniversary alongside Suiter. On October 10, 2007, the WRAL sports department launched a sports talk radio station, WCMC-FM (which switched from a country music format); it is now the only FM sports talk station in the area and broadcasts in HD Radio. WRAL's newscasts are simulcast with local weather inserts on another sister station, WILM-LD in Wilmington.

The station moved newscasts out of the newsroom into Studio A in 2019 and upgraded to 4K cameras. A new set debuted with the noon newscast on October 31, 2019. The set, designed by Florida based FX Design Group, features a 20-by-11-foot (6.1 m × 3.4 m) LED video wall, the largest installation in a local news operation, and a smaller curved LED wall near the anchor desk.

==== Agricultural coverage ====
WRAL was one of the first stations in North Carolina to cover agricultural markets and farm news in its regular newscasts. During 1953, Farm Program aired from 6 to 6:15 a.m. and Regional and Farm News aired between 12:45 and 12:55 p.m. from Fayetteville.

WRAL's noon newscasts included a farm segment featuring each day's farm commodity prices, followed by a feature agricultural story from somewhere in the viewing area or around North Carolina. This grew WRAL's popularity in rural areas and with farmers, especially in Eastern North Carolina. The segments were anchored by veteran farm reporter Ray Wilkinson and were dropped in the late 1990s, but were continued on the evening news broadcasts by Ray's son Dan Wilkinson. After the sudden unexpected death of Dan Wilkinson in October 2003, it was decided that the station would no longer have a full-time farm reporter and frequent agricultural coverage came to an end.

==== Sky 5 ====
In 1979, WRAL became the state's first television station to begin using a news helicopter, known as "Sky 5". The Hughes 500 helicopter N8624F was painted in the livery of the Royal Saudi Air Force with "Sky 5" graphics added, reflecting the original customer before the sale fell through and WRAL purchased it for newsgathering.

The current Bell 407 helicopter was purchased for $2 million in 2000. The N553HD tail number represents the station's channel, that this is the third news gathering helicopter for the station and WRAL's role in pioneering high definition broadcasting. The aircraft was piloted by Steve Wiley, who had flown for the station from 1987 until his death on February 3, 2021. As of 2022 the helicopter is flown by two pilots that Wiley himself hired and trained to take over Sky 5 operations. Today, the aircraft is normally stored at the Raleigh-Durham International Airport, but a helipad is available on the roof above the Capitol Broadcasting President's office in the WRAL buildings near downtown Raleigh. The helicopter is equipped with $600,000 worth of video equipment including cameras installed on the tail, two in the cabin and a gyroscope controlled high definition camera under the nose, all of which can be controlled from the rear of the aircraft by a videographer. WRAL modified the helicopter to reach speeds of 130 miles per hour providing access to anywhere in the Triangle within seven minutes.

In over 30 years of electronic news gathering using helicopters, WRAL has had no significant incidents and remains one of the few stations to own rather than lease their helicopter. "Sky 5" has also participated in numerous search and rescue operations over the years at the request of local emergency officials before returning to newsgathering duties.

==== Awards ====
WRAL has received award nominations for news 32 times, tying Nashville station WTVF in the 2012 Mid-South Regional Emmy Awards and won 11. WRAL took home the Emmy for News Excellence, Evening Newscast, Breaking News, Serious Feature News Report, Light Feature News Report, Light Feature News Series, Interactivity, Promo Spot News Same Day, Promo Spot News Image, Graphics Arts, and News Writing. Several of the 2012 Emmys came from coverage of the April 2011 tornadoes that ripped through the area. Parent company Capitol Broadcasting along with the A.J. Fletcher Foundation were awarded the Governor's Award, the National Academy of Television Arts & Sciences' highest honor in 2012 as well.

In 1997, WRAL received eight Mid-South Regional Emmy Awards including those for news excellence, best newscast, best hard news series and investigative reporting. In 1998, WRAL received seven Mid-South Regional Emmy Awards including those for best daytime newscast, special event coverage, news magazine, news promotion, public service announcement, and best children's entertainment program.

WRAL was awarded nine Mid-South Regional Emmy Awards in 2000 including for documentaries on the Cape Light and coverage of the Special Olympics World Games. Jim Goodmon, president and CEO of WRAL parent company Capitol Broadcasting Company, Inc., was honored with the Lifetime Achievement Award as well.

In 2008, among the nine Emmy awards received by WRAL and WRAL.com received the inaugural award in Advanced Media for Interactivity for the video player used throughout the website. The station also won a bronze Horizon Interactive Award for their online hurricane tracker. Geoff Levine won the National Press Photographer of the Year award and the station received 6 awards from the North Carolina Associated Press Broadcasters.

WRAL has consistently swept television media categories in the Independent Weekly and Cary News annual "Best Of" awards voted by readers.

==== Notable current on-air staff ====
- Scott Mason – Tar Heel Traveler anchor/producer

==== Notable former on-air staff ====
- Adele Arakawa – anchor (1983–1989)
- Jim Axelrod – political reporter (1993–1996)
- Bret Baier – reporter (mid-1990s)
- Bobbie Battista – former co-anchor (1976–1981)
- Sandra Bookman – weekend anchor/reporter (1985–1989)
- Rich Brenner – sports anchor (1978–1981)
- Dale Cardwell – reporter (1985–1991)
- Bob Caudle – news and weather anchor/wrestling announcer
- David Crabtree – evening anchor (1994–2022)
- Greg Fishel (AMS Certified Broadcast Meteorologist Seal of Approval) – chief meteorologist (1981–2019)
- Charlie Gaddy – anchorman (1970–1994)
- Jesse Helms – general manager, commentator (1960–1972)
- Brad Johansen – anchor (2018–2019)
- Nate Johnson (AMS Certified Broadcast Meteorologist and NWA Seals of Approval) – meteorologist
- Bill Leslie – anchor
- Ray Reeve – WRAL's first sportscaster (1956–1973)
- Stuart Scott – reporter (1988–1990)
- Tom Suiter – sports anchor, Football Friday anchor/producer and reporter for "The Extra Effort Award" (1981–2008; continued hosting the Football Friday program until the end of the 2015–16 football season)
- Mikaya Thurmond – journalist (2015–2022)
- Ray Wilkinson – farm news (1963–1995)
- Kelly Wright – reporter and weekend anchor (mid-1990s)

== Technical information ==
=== Subchannels ===
The station's digital signal is multiplexed:

Subchannels of WRAL-TV
Subchannel	Res.	Short name	Programming
5.1	1080i	WRAL HD	NBC
5.2	480i	WRAL DT	Cozi TV
5.3	480i	WRAL 3	Start TV
5.4	480i	WRAL 4	Ion Mystery
34.1	720p	WARZ CD	WRAL Plus (WNGT-CD)

On June 19, 1996, the Federal Communications Commission (FCC) awarded WRAL-TV the first experimental high-definition television license in the United States. The station, identified as "WRAL-HD", began digital television operations on UHF channel 32 over a month later, on July 23, 1996. The station's digital signal moved to channel 53 in March 2000.

WRAL-TV was the first in the U.S. to broadcast a live sports program in high definition (on September 6, 1997), as well as the first HD newscast (on October 13, 2000). CBS utilized WRAL-HD in testing its own high-definition programming, and in 1999, began providing the station with a regular schedule of prime time programs in HD. HD sports programming recorded by WRAL was provided to other model stations as well. WRAL-TV's pioneering efforts in digital television have won wide recognition from within the television industry.

=== Analog-to-digital conversion ===
WRAL-TV ended regular programming on its analog signal, over VHF channel 5, at 12:55 p.m. on June 12, 2009, the official date on which full-power television stations in the United States transitioned from analog to digital broadcasts under federal mandate. The station's digital signal remained on its pre-transition UHF channel 48, using virtual channel 5.

As part of the SAFER Act, WRAL-TV kept its analog signal on the air until July 6 to inform viewers of the digital television transition through a loop of public service announcements from the National Association of Broadcasters.

=== ATSC 3.0 ===
WRAL-EX
- Raleigh–Durham–; Fayetteville, North Carolina
- City: Raleigh, North Carolina
- Channels: Digital: 39 (UHF); Virtual: 39

Programming
- Subchannels: 39.1: 1080p simulcast of 5.1; 39.2: 4K/2160p UHDTV demo loop

History
- First air date: June 29, 2016
- Last air date: 2018

Technical information
- Licensing authority: FCC
- Facility ID: 703425
- ERP: 40 kW
- HAAT: 548 m (1,798 ft)
- Transmitter coordinates: 35°40′35.1″N 78°32′7.2″W

Links
- Public license information: Public file; LMS

On June 29, 2016, WRAL became the first U.S. television station to begin broadcasting a full-time service using ATSC 3.0 digital television standards, operating under an experimental license from the FCC on UHF channel 39 as WRAL-EX. The service broadcast two subchannels, including a simulcast of WRAL's main programming in 1080p high definition, and a demo loop of content in 4K ultra high-definition television, along with testing for NBC involving the 2016 Summer Olympics and 2018 Winter Olympics. The station produced episodes of its series Out & About in 4K. However, WRAL-EX left the air in 2018 as a consequence of the FCC's repacking process as a result of a spectrum auction and has not returned. On September 11, 2020, Capitol Broadcasting bought then-WARZ-CD for $725,000, and since then has used the station, now WNGT-CD, as an ATSC 3.0 multiplex for the region. Like WRAL-EX, WNGT-CD has since simulcast WRAL in 1080p as well.

Subchannel	Res.	Programming
39.1	1080p	NBC
39.2	2160p	UHD demo loop

=== Mobile Emergency Alert System ===
WRAL-TV debuted the first Mobile Emergency Alert System (M-EAS) in the United States on September 13, 2012. The system allows emergency information including text, web pages and video to be distributed to compatible receivers using existing digital television signals.

== Station coverage ==
WRAL's signal can be viewed across much of Central and Eastern North Carolina. The official eastern fringe of the Raleigh market is Halifax County and the western fringe is Orange County. The Virginia and South Carolina state lines make up the northern and southern fringe respectively, with the exception of Mecklenburg County, Virginia. WRAL can be seen well outside of the Raleigh market, with the signal penetrating parts of the Greenville, Greensboro, Wilmington, Charlotte, Roanoke–Lynchburg, Richmond, Norfolk and Florence–Myrtle Beach markets. WRAL's signal reaches as far east as U.S. Highway 17 in the Greenville-Washington-New Bern market, including the city of Greenville. The fringe area of WRAL's digital signal runs as far east as the western side of Beaufort County.

WRAL-TV is still viewed and is quite popular with many outside of the Triangle, mainly in portions of the Piedmont Triad, Eastern North Carolina, and even into parts of Southside Virginia and the Pee Dee region of South Carolina. It has long been available on cable as far east as Wilmington. The station is also known for its award-winning documentaries, children's shows and news staff, which has attracted viewers from outside of the Raleigh market. Halifax County in Southside Virginia is frequently mentioned by WRAL, although it is located in the Roanoke–Lynchburg market.

== Amenities ==
The station building, shared by WRAL-TV and WRAZ, and located at 2619 Western Boulevard in Raleigh, adjacent to the North Carolina State University campus, is a modern and open-designed structure and grounds. The property features a fountain visible from the roadway near the building entrance, a helipad on top of the building for the landing of Sky 5, and a large garden in the back of the property, including many varieties of azaleas and other flowering plants including several types of dogwoods. The garden is a popular public attraction, especially during April when the flowers are at the peak of blooming.
