= WKRR =

Classic rock radio station in Asheboro, North Carolina

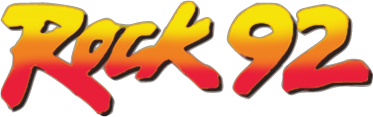
- Asheboro, North Carolina; United States
- Broadcast area: Piedmont Triad
- Frequency: 92.3 MHz
- Branding: Rock 92

Programming
- Format: Classic rock
- Affiliations: Carolina Panthers Radio Network

Ownership
- Owner: Dick Broadcasting; (Dick Broadcasting Company of Tennessee)
- Sister stations: WKZL

History
- First air date: November 1948 (as WGWR-FM)
- Former call signs: WGWR-FM (1948–1973); WCSE (1973–1984); WRLT (1984–1985)
- Former frequencies: 107.9 MHz (1948)

Technical information
- Licensing authority: FCC
- Facility ID: 16892
- Class: C0
- ERP: 100,000 watts
- HAAT: 393 meters (1,289 ft)
- Transmitter coordinates: 35°49′59.5″N 79°50′1.1″W

Links
- Public license information: Public file; LMS
- Webcast: Listen live
- Website: rock92.com

WKRR (92.3 FM) is a commercial radio station licensed to serve Asheboro, North Carolina in the Piedmont Triad radio market. It broadcasts a classic rock radio format, branded as Rock 92, and is the Triad's affiliate for the Carolina Panthers Radio Network. WKRR is owned by Dick Broadcasting, along with WKZL 107.5 KZL in Winston-Salem. Both stations broadcast from studios and offices on East Lewis Street in Greensboro. The transmitter is off Island Ford Road in Randleman, North Carolina (35°50′0.0″N 79°50′1.0″W).

== History ==
In November 1948, WGWR-FM signed on as the sister station to WGWR (1260 AM). At first, WGWR-FM simulcast WGWR. From the late 1960s until 1984, the station played country music with the WCSE call sign. On April 4, 1984, the call sign was changed to WRLT. It played a "light" soft adult contemporary format.

The station's call sign was changed to WKRR on October 11, 1985. FM pioneer James Dick bought the station and made his son, Allen, station manager. Under Allen's watch, it became one of the highest-rated stations in the Triad. Allen took over the company after his father retired in 1992. Though WSEZ was already playing album oriented rock (AOR) when Rock 92 started, that station did not last. WKRR evolved to classic rock in the early 1990s, changing its name to Classic Rock 92 when other rock stations began competing.

Dick Broadcasting sold off almost all of its stations to Cumulus Media in 2000, but retained WKRR and WKZL. However, years later, the licensee name still reads "Dick Broadcasting Company of Tennessee".

== Personalities ==
WKRR aired the syndicated John Boy and Billy morning show for three years, ending January 1, 1999. John Boy and Billy are syndicated from WRFX in Charlotte, North Carolina.

The station is home to the 2 Guys Named Chris Show, which debuted on January 4, 1999. The show airs live every weekday morning, with recorded episodes aired weekday evenings and Saturday mornings. The show is currently hosted by Chris Kelly, Josh "Biggie" Ellinger, B.B. Shea, and Rachel Craddock. 2 Guys Named Chris is one of the most popular radio programs in central North Carolina. In January 2026 Demm announced he would retire the following March after 27 years. Former co-host Chris Demm's final show was March 25, 2026.

Dave Aiken was fired on July 31, 2024, as a part of significant layoffs that occurred throughout Dick Broadcasting stations in the Mid-Atlantic.

WKRR is the Triad's affiliate for the Carolina Panthers Radio Network.

== Broadcast Signal ==
WKRR is short-spaced to WXLK K92 (licensed to serve Roanoke, Virginia) as they operate on the same channel and the distance between the stations' transmitters is 96 miles as determined by FCC rules. The minimum distance between a Class C0 FM radio station (WKRR) and a Class C FM radio station (WXLK) operating on the same frequency according to current FCC rules is 175 miles. Both stations use directional antennas to reduce their signals toward each other. Even with this restriction, WKRR provides at least grade B coverage as far west as Charlotte, as far east as Raleigh and Fort Bragg, as far south as Rockingham and as far north as the Virginia border.
