= Ray Wilkinson =

Ray Wilkinson (April 14, 1925 – December 4, 2004) was a long-time agricultural news anchor and reporter for Capitol Broadcasting Company in Raleigh, North Carolina.

Wilkinson was born in Lombard, Illinois. Wilkinson served in World War II and briefly did a radio stint in Savannah, Georgia before moving to North Carolina. Wilkinson first came to North Carolina in 1948, where he worked for several radio stations in Rocky Mount, North Carolina. He then moved to Raleigh in 1963 to work for Capitol Broadcasting, the parent owner of WRAL-TV. He was responsible for covering farm news and all things agricultural and was well known for his intensive coverage of agricultural markets. Working in both television and radio at Capitol, he was the general manager of the Tobacco Radio Network. Wilkinson was responsible for taking the Tobacco Radio Network from a small local radio broadcast to one that was broadcast from Virginia to Florida. Wilkinson is probably best known for his Cecil and Leonard jokes. The jokes were centered on the lives and happenings of Cecil and Leonard, two fictional country friends in eastern North Carolina. He was known for his dedicated support of the revitalization efforts of historic Halifax, North Carolina. Wilkinson died December 4, 2004, in Raleigh, North Carolina, from complications of Parkinson's disease at the age of 79.
