= Tobacco Radio Network =

Tobacco Radio Network was a radio network owned and operated by Capitol Broadcasting Company of Raleigh, North Carolina. Begun in 1942, the network was dedicated to educating and keeping farmers informed of the latest agricultural news, stories, and market standings. With the help of broadcaster Ray Wilkinson, the network went from being broadcast on one North Carolina affiliate to affiliates from Virginia to Florida. In the late 1940s, a sister station was formed called the Tobacco Sports Network, which carried North Carolina collegiate football and basketball. In 1959, the two networks were merged into the Tobacco Network and later that became the Capitol Agribusiness Network. In 1996, all of Capitol Broadcasting's radio networks were restructured and merged into the North Carolina News Network.
