= Peggy Mann =

American jazz musician

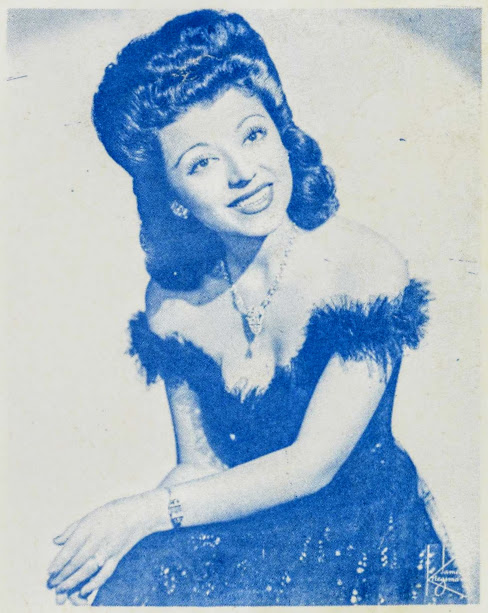
Peggy Mann, from the sheet music cover to "I Didn't Think You Cared"

Margaret Dunlap (née Germano, September 28, 1918 – August 13, 1988), better known as Peggy Mann, was an American Big Band singer who was prominent in the 1930s and 1940s. She worked with the likes of Henry Halstead, Ben Pollack, Larry Clinton, and Teddy Powell, and also as a solo act, before retiring from the music industry in the early 1950s. Mann was born in Yonkers, New York. A review in Billboard magazine referred to her "captivating manner that has made her a favorite song stylist."

Mann was a replacement singer for Joan Edwards on the radio version of Your Hit Parade.

Mann married Roderick Dunlap in 1971 in Washington D.C., and the couple returned to living in Yonkers after Mann's stint in Los Angeles. He predeceased her in July 1987. Mann died at her home in Yonkers, New York in August 1988 at the age of 69.
