= Tom Suiter =

American sportscaster

Tom Suiter is a retired sportscaster for WRAL-TV and former host of Football Friday, a high school football news show also on WRAL-TV in Raleigh, North Carolina. Suiter stepped down from his sportscaster role in 2008, but continued to work on Football Friday and Extra Effort Award segments through the 2015-16 academic year.

== Awards ==
Suiter has won two Midsouth Emmy Awards and named to that awards series' Silver Circle. He was also inducted into the North Carolina High School Sports Hall of Fame in 2012. Suiter was also named among the top three local sportscasters by Radio TV Age magazine.
