= Nate Johnson (meteorologist) =

American meteorologist

Nathan Johnson is an American meteorologist serving as Vice President of Weather Content and Operations for NBC Universal owned and operated stations (including Telemundo) since November 2018, a position created by NBC for Johnson. He Previously he worked for WRAL-TV in Raleigh, North Carolina as a meteorologist and executive producer focusing on weather operations since 2007.

Johnson has also served meteorology lecturer at North Carolina State University since 2010 and serves as gameday meteorologist for NC State football games at Carter-Finley Stadium.

Prior to joining WRAL, Johnson was a data services meteorologist with Baron Services in Huntsville, Alabama. Prior to that he served as chief meteorologist at KTXS-TV in Abilene, Texas. Johnson earned bachelor's degrees in both meteorology and computer science from North Carolina State University. He interned with WRAL from May 1999 - May 2000.

Johnson earned bachelors degrees in Meteorlogy and Computer Science as well as a master's degree in communications focusing on weather related risk communication.

== Certification ==
- Seal of Approval for TV Weathercasting, National Weather Association
- Certified Broadcast Meteorologist. American Meteorological Society

== Awards ==
- 2003: Best Team Coverage – 2002 Floods (Texas AP Broadcasters Division III)
- 2005: Best Local TV Weather Person (Abilene Reporter-News Readers’ Choice)
- 2006: Best Local TV Weather Person (Abilene Reporter-News Readers’ Choice)
- 2011: Regional Emmy Nomination, Weather (National Academy of Television Arts and Sciences Mid-South Chapter),
- 2012: Regional Emmy, Breaking News (National Academy of Television Arts and Sciences Mid-South Chapter)
- 2012: Continuing Coverage (Radio Television Digital News Association)
- 2012: Regional Edward R. Murrow Award
- 2012: AP Award, Best Weather (North Carolina AP Broadcasters)
- 2012: Regional Emmy, Breaking News: "Deadly Tornados" (National Academy of Television Arts and Sciences Mid-South Chapter)
- 2012: National Emmy nomination, Breaking News (National Academy of Television Arts and Sciences)
- 2013: Best weather reporting (North Carolina AP Broadcasters)
- 2014: Regional Emmy, Weekend Newscast "Hurricane Sandy" (National Academy of Television Arts and Sciences Mid-South Chapter)
