= Nate Johnson (wide receiver) =

American football player (born 1957)

No. 84
- Position: Wide receiver

Personal information
- Born: May 12, 1957 (age 69); St. Petersburg, Florida, U.S.
- Listed height: 5 ft 11 in (1.80 m)
- Listed weight: 192 lb (87 kg)

Career information
- High school: Dixie Hollins (St. Petersburg)
- College: Hillsdale
- NFL draft: 1980: 7th round, 193rd overall pick

Career history
- Pittsburgh Steelers (1980)*; New York Giants (1980); Baltimore Colts (1981)*; Winnipeg Blue Bombers (1982–1983); Saskatchewan Roughriders (1983); Calgary Stampeders (1984); Cleveland Browns (1985)*
- * Offseason or practice squad member only

Career NFL statistics
- Games played: 16
- Stats at Pro Football Reference

Nathaniel Johnson (born May 12, 1957) is an American former professional football player who was a wide receiver for the New York Giants of the National Football League (NFL). He played college football for the Hillsdale Chargers.
