= Rich Brenner =

American television sportscaster

- Born: November 24, 1946
- Died: February 27, 2012 (aged 65); Greensboro, North Carolina
- Occupation: Television sportscaster

Rich Brenner (November 24, 1946 – February 27, 2012) was an American television sportscaster.

== Life and career ==
Brenner was a graduate of Baldwin-Wallace College in Berea, Ohio. He was student senate president, sports editor of the college newspaper, Who's Who in American Colleges and Universities, and a member of Lambda Chi Alpha fraternity. He earned a Bachelor of Arts in Political Science from BW in 1968. Rich broadcasts his first football game at his college over the radio with play-by-play reports in October 1965, and spent the summer of 1967, between his sophomore and junior years of college, as a correspondent in Vietnam. He began with television career in 1975 American television sportscaster. For two decades, he reported with WGHP in High Point, North Carolina until his retirement in April 2008. He was a captain in the United States Marine Corps Reserves. In 1972, he joined the 4th Civil Affairs Group located at the Washington, DC Navy Yard. He served as a platoon leader and rose to the rank of Captain before leaving that unit in June 1975. Rich anchored sports for WLVA in Lynchburg, Virginia (1975–1977); WAVY in Portsmouth, Virginia (1977–1978); WRAL, Raleigh, North Carolina (1978–1981); WMAQ, Chicago, Illinois (1981–1983); WTVD, Durham, North Carolina (1983–1986) and WGHP, Greensboro, North Carolina (1987–2008). Rich worked tirelessly for charities in his community and across the state. He was a dedicated volunteer, who donated his time as emcee for many fundraising events and charities. He also served as a tutor to kindergartners at Pilot Elementary School. Rich also found time to teach a broadcasting class at Elon University. There is a scholarship offered at UNCGreensboro and another at the Corrigan/Faircloth Chapter for the National Football Foundation in Rich's name. He has mentored hundreds of young aspiring sportscasters and journalist over his 34 years in broadcasting.

== Death ==
On February 27, 2012, Rich developed a cough during a talk given to military and first responders at "The American Red Cross Salute to Heroes" He was taken to Moses Cone hospital where he died that evening of a heart attack. Rich was speaking about a passion of his and many others to finish building the Carolina Field of Honor, which was opened on Memorial Day 2013.

== Awards ==
- Silver Circle Award from the National Academy of Television Arts and Sciences
- (3) Southeast Regional Emmy awards
- Iris Award from the National Association of Television Program Executives
- Charlie Harville award
- Grady Elmore award
- Guilford County Sports Hall of Fame
- NCHSAA Hall of Fame
- 1977 Virginia Sportscaster of the Year
