= List of radio stations in North Carolina =

The following is a list of FCC-licensed radio stations in the U.S. state of North Carolina, which can be sorted by their call signs, frequencies, cities of license, licensees, and programming formats.

== List of radio stations ==
Call sign	Frequency	City of license	Licensee	Format
WAAE	91.9 FM	New Bern	American Family Association	Inspirational (AFR)
WAAV	980 AM	Leland	Cumulus Licensing LLC	News/Talk
WABZ-LP	101.5 FM	Albemarle	Valley View Radio	Variety
WACB	860 AM	Taylorsville	Apple City Broadcasting	Variety
WADE	1340 AM	Wadesboro	New Life Community Temple of Faith, Inc.	Urban contemporary gospel
WAGO	88.7 FM	Snow Hill	Pathway Christian Academy, Inc.	Christian (Go Mix! Radio)
WAGR	1340 AM	Lumberton	WAGR Broadcasting	Gospel
WAGY	1320 AM	Forest City	KTC Broadcasting, Inc.	Oldies
WAIZ	630 AM	Hickory	Newton-Conover Communications	Oldies
WAJA-LP	102.5 FM	Rocky Mount	New Lite Media	Gospel
WAME	550 AM	Statesville	Statesville Family Radio Corporation	Classic country
WAOG-LP	100.7 FM	Aberdeen	Calvary Chapel of the Sandhills	Christian
WARR	1520 AM	Warrenton	Logan Darensburg d/b/a Darensburg Broadcasting	African-American Variety
WART-LP	95.5 FM	Marshall	Radio Madison	Variety
WASQ-LP	99.1 FM	Statesville	South River Baptist Church	Variety
WASU-FM	90.5 FM	Boone	Appalachian State University	College radio
WATA	1450 AM	Boone	High Country Adventures, LLC	News/Talk
WAUG	750 AM	New Hope	St. Augustine's University	mainstream urban contemporary
WAVQ	1400 AM	Jacksonville	Eastern Airwaves, LLC	Beach music
WAYN	900 AM	Rockingham	WAYN Incorporated	Adult contemporary
WAZO	107.5 FM	Southport	Sunrise Broadcasting, LLC	Top 40 (CHR)
WAZZ	1490 AM	Fayetteville	Beasley Media Group, LLC	Top 40 (CHR)
WBAC-LP	101.5 FM	Belmont	Belmont Abbey College	Christian
WBAG	1150 AM	Burlington-Graham	Gray Broadcasting, LLC	News/Talk
WBAV-FM	101.9 FM	Gastonia	Beasley Media Group Licenses, LLC	Urban adult contemporary
WBBB	96.1 FM	Raleigh	Carolina Media Group, Inc.	Adult hits
WBFJ	1550 AM	Winston-Salem	Triad Family Network, Inc.	Christian Talk & Teaching
WBFJ-FM	89.3 FM	Winston-Salem	Triad Family Network, Inc.	Contemporary Christian
WBHN	1590 AM	Bryson City	Five Forty Broadcasting Company, LLC	Classic country
WBIC-LP	97.3 FM	Wilson	Tabernacle Baptist Church of Wilson, North Carolina	Christian
WBIG	1470 AM	Greensboro	Twin City Broadcasting Company, LLC	Classic hits
WBIS-LP	106.9 FM	Winterville	Community Care Fellowship	Urban gospel
WBJD	91.5 FM	Atlantic Beach	Craven Community College	Classical
WBKU	91.7 FM	Ahoskie	American Family Association	Inspirational (AFR)
WBKZ	105.1 FM	Havelock	Educational Media Foundation	Contemporary worship (Air1)
WBLA	1440 AM	Elizabethtown	Baldwin Branch Missionary Baptist Church	Gospel
WBLO	790 AM	Thomasville	GHB Radio, Inc.	Spanish tropical
WBNK	92.7 FM	Pine Knoll Shores	Educational Media Foundation	Contemporary Christian
WBPL-LP	93.1 FM	Wilmington	Ave Maria Radio Association	Catholic
WBRM	1250 AM	Marion	Skyline Media Holdings, LLC	Country
WBT	1110 AM	Charlotte	Radio One of North Carolina, LLC	News/Talk
WBT-FM	107.9 FM	Charlotte	Radio One of North Carolina, LLC	News/Talk
WBTE	990 AM	Windsor	Dr. Tine Hicks & Associate	Gospel
WBUX	90.5 FM	Buxton	WUNC Public Radio, LLC	Public radio
WBXB	100.1 FM	Edenton	Friendship Cathederal Family Worship Center, Inc.	Urban contemporary gospel
WBYJ-LP	97.9 FM	Burlington	Burlington Christian Radio, Inc.	Gospel
WCAB	590 AM	Rutherfordton	Skyline Media of Rutherfordton, LLC	Classic country
WCBQ	1340 AM	Oxford	The Paradise Network (TPN) of North Carolina, Inc.	Gospel
WCBT	1230 AM	Roanoke Rapids	Shantae Broadcasting Inc.	Sports (SM)
WCCE	90.1 FM	Buies Creek	Radio Training Network, Inc.	Religious
WCCG	104.5 FM	Hope Mills	Dr. James E. Carson	Mainstream urban
WCGC	1270 AM	Belmont	Carolina Catholic Radio Network	Christian
WCHL	1360 AM	Chapel Hill	Rudd Media, LLC	News/Talk/Sports
WCIS	760 AM	Morganton	W.F.M. Incorporated	Southern gospel
WCKB	780 AM	Dunn	North Carolina Central Broadcasters, Inc.	Southern gospel
WCLN	1170 AM	Clinton	Clinton Sampson Radio Company, Inc.	Oldies
WCLN-FM	105.7 FM	Rennert	Grander Vision Media, LLC	Christian
WCLW	1130 AM	Eden	Dr. Jerry L. Carter, d/b/a Reidsville Baptist Church	Southern gospel
WCMC-FM	99.9 FM	Holly Springs	WCMC-FM, LLC	Sports (ESPN)
WCNC	1240 AM	Elizabeth City	East Carolina Radio of Elizabeth City	Talk
WCNG	102.7 FM	Murphy	Cherokee Broadcasting Co., Inc.	Soft adult contemporary
WCOG	1320 AM	Greensboro	Crescent Media Group LLC	Oldies
WCOK	1060 AM	Sparta	Gospel Broadcasting, Inc.	Country
WCOM-LP	103.5 FM	Carrboro	Public Gallery of Carrboro, Inc.	Variety/Pacifica
WCPE	89.7 FM	Raleigh	Educational Information Corporation	Classical
WCPS	760 AM	Tarboro	Trey and Associates, LLC	Urban contemporary gospel/urban oldies
WCQS	88.1 FM	Asheville	Western North Carolina Public Radio	Public radio
WCRU	960 AM	Dallas	Truth Broadcasting Corporation	Christian talk
WCSL	1590 AM	Cherryville	KTC Broadcasting, Inc.	Classic country
WCVP	600 AM	Murphy	Cherokee Broadcasting Company	Mexican
WCVP-FM	95.9 FM	Robbinsville	Cherokee Broadcasting Company, Inc.	Country
WCXL	104.1 FM	Kill Devil Hills	Jeffrey T. Testa, Trustee of JAM Media Solutions, LLC	Conservative talk
WCXN	1170 AM	Claremont	Birach Broadcasting Corporation	Gospel
WDAV	89.9 FM	Davidson	The Trustees of Davidson College	Classical music & public radio
WDBP-LP	106.7 FM	Rocky Mount	North Carolina Humane Society State Council	Variety
WDCC	90.5 FM	Sanford	Central Carolina Community College	Rhythmic contemporary
WDCG	105.1 FM	Durham	iHM Licenses, LLC	Top 40 (CHR)
WDEX	1430 AM	Monroe	New Life Community Temple of Faith, Inc.	Gospel
WDFC-LP	101.7 FM	Greensboro	CUMC Radio, LLC	Classical/Smooth Jazz/Beach Music
WDJS	1430 AM	Mount Olive	Mount Olive Broadcasting Company, L.L.C.	Religious
WDLX	930 AM	Washington	Pirate Media Group, LLC	Sports
WDLZ	98.3 FM	Murfreesboro	Byrne Acquisition Group, LLC	Adult hits
WDNC	620 AM	Durham	WDNC-AM, LLC	Sports (ESPN)
WDRU	1030 AM	Creedmoor	Truth Broadcasting	Christian talk
WDSG-LP	107.9 FM	Sanford	The Sounds of Sanford, Inc.	Gospel/Oldies
WDSL	1520 AM	Mocksville	Farren K. Shoaf	Classic country/Bluegrass
WDUR	1490 AM	Durham	Arohi Media LLC	South Asian
WDVV	89.7 FM	Wilmington	Caroloma Christian Radio Inc.	Christian radio
WDWG	98.5 FM	Rocky Mount	First Media Radio, LLC	Country
WDYT	1220 AM	Kings Mountain	Iglesia Nueva Vida of High Point	Urban contemporary
WDZD-LP	99.1 FM	Monroe	Shaggers, Inc.	Classic hits
WEAD-LP	106.7 FM	Wendell	Associacion Dominicana de Raleigh, NC	Spanish
WEAL	1510 AM	Greensboro	Delmarva Educational Association	Contemporary Christian
WECR	1130 AM	Newland	High Country Adventures, LLC	Adult contemporary
WECU	1570 AM	Winterville	CTC Media Group	Sports (ESPN)
WEEB	990 AM	Southern Pines	Pinehurst Broadcasting Corp.	News/Talk
WEED	1390 AM	Rocky Mount	Northstar Broadcasting	Black gospel
WEHB-LP	98.3 FM	Wadesboro	First United Methodist Church	Religious Teaching
WEJM-LP	99.9 FM	Mount Zion	M&M Community Development, Inc. Greensboro, NC Branch	Urban
WELS-FM	102.9 FM	Kinston	Eastern Airwaves, LLC	Beach music
WENC	1220 AM	Whiteville	Godwin Communications, LLC	Gospel/News/Talk/Urban AC
WEND	106.5 FM	Salisbury	iHM Licenses, LLC	Alternative rock
WEOM-LP	103.1 FM	Thomasville	World Evangelistic Outreach Ministries, Inc.	Gospel/Jazz/Urban
WERO	93.3 FM	Washington	Dick Broadcasting Company, Inc. of Tennessee	Top 40 (CHR)
WERX-FM	102.5 FM	Columbia	Lawrence Loesch and Margaret Loesch	Classic hits
WETC	540 AM	Wendell-Zebulon	Divine Mercy Radio, Inc.	Catholic
WEWO	1460 AM	Laurinburg	Service Media, Inc.	Gospel
WEZG-LP	102.5 FM	Statesville	Covenant Broadcasting Company of Statesville, Inc.	Religious Teaching
WEZZ	970 AM	Canton	EZ Radio LLC	Sports (FSR)
WFAE	90.7 FM	Charlotte	University Radio Foundation, Inc.	News/Talk, NPR
WFAY	1230 AM	Fayetteville	Colonial Media and Entertainment, LLC	Country
WFBT	106.7 FM	Carolina Beach	Carolina Christian Radio	Southern gospel
WFDD	88.5 FM	Winston-Salem	Wake Forest University	Public radio / News/Talk
WFHC-LP	106.5 FM	Hendersonville	JBN Inc.	Christian
WFHE	90.3 FM	Hickory	University Radio Foundation, Inc.	News/Talk, NPR
WFJA	105.5 FM	Sanford	Sandhills Broadcasting Group LLC	Classic hits
WFLB	96.5 FM	Laurinburg	Beasley Media Group, LLC	Adult hits
WFMC	730 AM	Goldsboro	New Age Communications, Inc.	Black gospel
WFMI	100.9 FM	Southern Shores	Communications Systems, Inc.	Urban contemporary gospel
WFMO	860 AM	Fairmont	Truth Broadcasting Corporation	Regional Mexican
WFMZ	104.9 FM	Hertford	East Carolina Radio of Hertford, Inc.	Urban contemporary
WFNC	640 AM	Fayetteville	Cumulus Licensing LLC	News/Talk
WFNE-LP	103.5 FM	Wake Forest	Epic Radio, Inc.	Catholic
WFNZ-FM	92.7 FM	Harrisburg	Radio One of North Carolina, LLC	Sports (ISN)
WFOZ-LP	105.1 FM	Winston-Salem	Forsyth Technical Community College	Variety
WFQS	91.3 FM	Franklin	Western North Carolina Public Radio	Public radio
WFSC	1050 AM	Franklin	Sutton Radiocasting Corporation	Classic hits
WFSS	91.9 FM	Fayetteville	WUNC Public Radio, LLC	Public radio
WFVL	102.3 FM	Lumberton	Educational Media Foundation	Contemporary Christian (K-Love)
WFXC	107.1 FM	Durham	Radio One Licenses, LLC	Urban adult contemporary
WFXK	104.3 FM	Tarboro	Radio One Licenses, LLC	Urban adult contemporary
WGAI	560 AM	Elizabeth City	Gregory Communications License, Inc.	News/Talk
WGAS	1420 AM	South Gastonia	Victory Christian Center, Inc.	Religious
WGBR	1150 AM	Goldsboro	New Age Communications, Ltd.	Classic hits
WGCR	720 AM	Pisgah Forest	Anchor Baptist Broadcasting Association	Christian
WGFY	1480 AM	Charlotte	Charlotte Advent Media Corporation	Christian
WGHB	1250 AM	Farmville	Pirate Media Group, LLC	Sports
WGHJ	105.3 FM	Fair Bluff	Augusta Radio Fellowship Institute	Christian (Good News Network)
WGHW	88.1 FM	Lockwoods Folly Town	Peace Baptist Church of Wilmington, NC	Religious
WGIV	1370 AM	Pineville	RFPJY, LLC	Urban contemporary
WGIW	89.7 FM	Pilot Mountain	Church Planters of America	Gospel
WGML	88.1 FM	Vanceboro	Pathway Christian Academy, Inc.	Religion
WGNC	1450 AM	Gastonia	SN Radio, LLC	News/Talk/Sports
WGNI	102.7 FM	Wilmington	Cumulus Licensing LLC	Adult contemporary
WGOS	1070 AM	High Point	Iglesia Nueva Vida of High Point, Inc.	News/Talk
WGSP	1310 AM	Charlotte	Norsan Consulting and Management, Inc.	Spanish tropical
WGTI	97.7 FM	Winfall	Educational Media Foundation	Contemporary worship (Air1)
WGTL	104.7 FM	La Grange	Conner Media, Inc.	Spanish
WGXM	91.1 FM	Calypso	Pathway Christian Academy, Inc.	Christian (Go Mix! Radio)
WGXO	90.9 FM	Magnolia	Pathway Christian Academy, Inc.	Christian (Go Mix! Radio)
WHBK	1460 AM	Marshall	Seay Broadcasting, Inc.	Southern gospel
WHBT-FM	92.1 FM	Moyock	iHM Licenses, LLC	Classic hip hop
WHDX	99.9 FM	Waves	Radio Hatteras, Inc.	Variety
WHDZ	101.5 FM	Buxton	Radio Hatteras, Inc.	Variety
WHFK-LP	105.5 FM	Red Oak	Northern Nash High School	Variety
WHGO	91.3 FM	Hertford	Pathway Christian Academy, Inc.	Christian (Go Mix! Radio)
WHGW-LP	100.3 FM	Morganton	Morganton Christian Radio Corporation	Christian
WHIP	1350 AM	Mooresville	Mooresville Media, Inc.	Oldies
WHKP	1450 AM	Hendersonville	Radio Hendersonville, Inc.	Country/Talk
WHKY	1290 AM	Hickory	Long Communications, LLC	News/Talk
WHLC	104.5 FM	Highlands	Charisma Radio Corp.	Easy listening
WHNC	890 AM	Henderson	The Paradise Network (TPN) of North Carolina, Inc.	Gospel
WHPE-FM	95.5 FM	High Point	Bible Broadcasting Network, Inc.	Conservative religious (Bible Broadcasting Network)
WHPY	1590 AM	Clayton	Fellowship Baptist Church Inc.	Religious
WHQC	96.1 FM	Shelby	iHM Licenses, LLC	Top 40 (CHR)
WHQR	91.3 FM	Wilmington	Friends of Public Radio	Public radio
WHSP-LP	100.9 FM	Black Mountain	Church of the Incarnation of Asheville, Incorporated	Religious Teaching
WHUP-LP	104.7 FM	Hillsborough	Hillsborough Community Radio	community radio
WHVN	1240 AM	Charlotte	Truth Broadcasting Corporation	Religious
WIAM	900 AM	Williamston	Lifeline Ministries, Inc.	Southern gospel
WICE-LP	97.1 FM	Hendersonville	Ebenezer Pentecostal Radio Service	Religious Teaching
WIDU	1600 AM	Fayetteville	W I D U Broadcasting, Inc.	Black gospel
WIFM-FM	100.9 FM	Elkin	Yadkin Valley Broadcasting Corporation	Adult contemporary
WIID	88.1 FM	Rodanthe	Craven County SBA Inc	Hot adult contemporary
WIKS	101.9 FM	New Bern	CMG Coastal Carolina, LLC	Mainstream urban
WILT	103.7 FM	Wrightsville Beach	Sunrise Broadcasting, LLC	Adult contemporary
WIOZ	550 AM	Pinehurst	Muirfield Broadcasting, Inc.	Adult standards
WIOZ-FM	102.5 FM	Southern Pines	Meridian Communications L.L.C.	Adult contemporary
WISE	1310 AM	Asheville	Saga Communications of North Carolina, LLC	Sports (FSR)
WIST-FM	98.3 FM	Thomasville	WEAM Quality Radio Corp.	Spanish language/Latino
WIXE	1190 AM	Monroe	Monroe Broadcasting Company, Inc.	Country/Talk
WIZS	1450 AM	Henderson	Rose Farm and Rentals, Inc.	Country
WJCV	1290 AM	Jacksonville	Down East Broadcasting Co Inc.	Religious
WJFT-LP	93.5 FM	Sanford	Sanford Church of Christ	Christian
WJHW	89.5 FM	Mayodan	Church Planters of America	Gospel
WJKA	90.1 FM	Jacksonville	American Family Association	Religious talk (AFR)
WJMH	102.1 FM	Reidsville	Audacy License, LLC	Urban contemporary
WJNC	1240 AM	Jacksonville	Pathway Christian Academy, Inc.	News/Talk/Sports
WJOF-LP	97.9 FM	Liberty	Health and Liberty, Inc.	Christian
WJQY-LP	101.1 FM	Wilson	Kingsmill Ministries Inc.	Religious Teaching
WJRI	1340 AM	Lenoir	Foothills Radio Group, LLC	Adult contemporary
WJRM	1390 AM	Troy	Family Worship Ministries, Inc.	Gospel
WJSG	104.3 FM	Hamlet	Jackson Broadcasting Company	Gospel
WJSI-LP	91.7 FM	Wilmington	St. Mark Radio Association	Catholic
WJSS-LP	103.1 FM	Wilmington	St. Jude Radio Association	Catholic
WJYJ	88.1 FM	Hickory	Positive Alternative Radio, Inc.	Southern gospel
WKBC	800 AM	North Wilkesboro	Wilkes Broadcasting Company, Inc.	Country
WKBC-FM	97.3 FM	North Wilkesboro	Wilkes Broadcasting Company, Inc.	Hot adult contemporary
WKDX	1250 AM	Hamlet	The McLaurin Group	Gospel
WKEW	1400 AM	Greensboro	Truth Broadcasting Corporation	Gospel
WKFV	107.3 FM	Clinton	Educational Media Foundation	Christian contemporary (K-LOVE)
WKGV	104.1 FM	Swansboro	Educational Media Foundation	Contemporary Christian (K-Love)
WKGX	1080 AM	Lenoir	Foothills Radio Group, LLC	Classic hits
WKHC	97.1 FM	Hatteras	Educational Media Foundation	Contemporary Christian (K-Love)
WKIX	850 AM	Raleigh	AM 850, LLC	Oldies
WKIX-FM	102.9 FM	Raleigh	FM 102.9 LLC	Classic hits
WKJO	102.3 FM	Smithfield	FM 102.3 LLC	Classic hits
WKJV	1380 AM	Asheville	International Baptist Outreach Missions	Religious
WKJW	1010 AM	Black Mountain	International Baptist Outreach Missions, Inc.	Christian talk
WKJX	96.7 FM	Elizabeth City	East Carolina Radio of Elizabeth City, Inc.	Hot adult contemporary
WKKT	96.9 FM	Statesville	iHM Licenses, LLC	Country
WKML	95.7 FM	Lumberton	Beasley Media Group, LLC	Country
WKNC-FM	88.1 FM	Raleigh	North Carolina State University	Variety
WKNS	90.3 FM	Kinston	Craven Community College	Classical
WKOO	710 AM	Rose Hill	Mega Media, Inc.	Classic country
WKQC	104.7 FM	Charlotte	Beasley Media Group Licenses, LLC	Adult contemporary
WKRK	1320 AM	Murphy	Radford Communications, Inc.	Classic country
WKRP-LP	101.9 FM	Raleigh	Oak City Media, Inc.	Variety
WKRR	92.3 FM	Asheboro	Dick Broadcasting Company, Inc. of Tennessee	Classic rock
WKRX	96.7 FM	Roxboro	Roxboro Broadcasting Company	Country
WKSF	99.9 FM	Old Fort	iHM Licenses, LLC	Country
WKSK	580 AM	West Jefferson	Caddell Broadcasting, Inc.	Country
WKTE	1090 AM	King	Booth-Newsom Broadcasting, Inc.	Oldies/Beach music/Classic country/R & B
WKVK	106.7 FM	Semora	Educational Media Foundation	Christian Contemporary (K-Love)
WKVS	103.3 FM	Lenoir	Foothills Radio Group, LLC	Country
WKXB	99.9 FM	Boiling Spring Lakes	Sunrise Broadcasting, LLC	Rhythmic oldies
WKXR	1260 AM	Asheboro	South Triad Broadcasting Corp.	Country
WKXS-FM	94.5 FM	Leland	Cumulus Licensing LLC	Classic rock
WKXU	102.5 FM	Hillsborough	New Century Media Group	Classic hits
WKYK	940 AM	Burnsville	Mark Media, Inc.	Classic country
WKZL	107.5 FM	Winston-Salem	Dick Broadcasting Company, Inc. of Tennessee	Top 40 (CHR)
WLFA	91.3 FM	Asheville	Radio Training Network, Inc.	Contemporary Christian
WLGP	100.3 FM	Harkers Island	Augusta Radio Fellowship Institute, Inc.	Christian (Good News Network)
WLHC	103.1 FM	Robbins	Woolstone Corporation	Adult standards/MOR
WLJF-LP	100.7 FM	Greensboro	Love and Faith Christian Fellowship	Urban gospel
WLJZ-LP	107.1 FM	Salisbury	Livingstone College	Variety
WLKO	102.9 FM	Hickory	iHM Licenses, LLC	Adult hits
WLLN	1370 AM	Lillington	Estuardo Valdemar Rodriguez	Spanish
WLLQ	1530 AM	Chapel Hill	Estuardo Valdemar Rodriguez and Leonor Rodriguez	Spanish
WLLY	1350 AM	Wilson	Estuardo Valdemar Rodriguez and Leonor Rodriguez, JT Tenants	Gospel
WLNC	1300 AM	Laurinburg	Scotland Broadcasting Company, Inc.	Adult contemporary, Oldies, & Carolina Beach Music
WLNK-FM	100.9 FM	Indian Trail	Radio One of North Carolina, LLC	Hot adult contemporary
WLNR	1230 AM	Kinston	Estuardo Valdemar Rodriguez & Leonor Rodriguez	Regional Mexican
WLOE	1490 AM	Eden	Truth Broadcasting Corporation	News/Talk
WLON	1050 AM	Lincolnton	Sports Talk Guys, LLC	Oldies
WLPS-FM	89.5 FM	Lumberton	Billy Ray Locklear Evangelistic Association	Gospel
WLQB	93.5 FM	Ocean Isle Beach	iHM Licenses, LLC	Regional Mexican
WLQC	103.1 FM	Sharpsburg	Pinestone Media Corporation	Adult standards/MOR
WLRZ-LP	99.3 FM	Hickory	Lenoir-Rhyne University	Adult album alternative
WLSG	1340 AM	Wilmington	Norsan Consulting and Management, Inc.	Regional Mexican
WLUL-LP	96.5 FM	Thomasville	Thomasville Educational Radio	Religious Teaching
WLWL	770 AM	Rockingham	Beach Music Broadcasting, Inc.	Urban oldies
WLXB	98.9 FM	Bethel	Educational Media Foundation	Contemporary Christian (K-Love)
WLXK	88.3 FM	Boiling Springs	Educational Media Foundation	Adult album alternative
WLXN	1440 AM	Lexington	Positive Alternative Radio, Inc.	Southern gospel
WLXZ	90.3 FM	Pinehurst	Educational Media Foundation	Christian Contemporary (K-Love)
WLYT-LP	94.7 FM	Mooresville	Bespoke Broadcasting	Classic hits
WMAG	99.5 FM	High Point	iHM Licenses, LLC	Adult contemporary
WMFA	1400 AM	Raeford	W & V Broadcasting	Gospel
WMFB-LP	101.5 FM	Charlotte	Monte Calvario Foundation, Inc.	Religious Teaching
WMFD	630 AM	Wilmington	Sunrise Broadcasting, LLC	Sports (ESPN)
WMFR	1230 AM	High Point	Triad Media Partners, Inc.	Country
WMGU	106.9 FM	Southern Pines	Cumulus Licensing LLC	Urban adult contemporary
WMGV	103.3 FM	Newport	CMG Coastal Carolina, LLC	Adult contemporary
WMIT	106.9 FM	Black Mountain	Blue Ridge Broadcasting Corporation	Christian
WMJV	99.5 FM	Grifton	CMG Coastal Carolina, LLC	Hot adult contemporary
WMKS	100.3 FM	High Point	iHM Licenses, LLC	Rhythmic Top 40
WMMY	106.1 FM	Jefferson	High Country Adventures, LLC	Country
WMNC	1430 AM	Morganton	Cooper Broadcasting Company	Classic country
WMNC-FM	92.1 FM	Morganton	Cooper Broadcasting Company	Country
WMNX	97.3 FM	Wilmington	Cumulus Licensing LLC	Urban contemporary
WMPM	1270 AM	Smithfield	Johnson Broadcast Ventures, Ltd.	Urban contemporary gospel/urban oldies
WMQS	88.5 FM	Murphy	Western North Carolina Public Radio, Inc.	Public radio
WMRV	1450 AM	Spring Lake	Colonial Media and Entertainment, LLC	Classic rock
WMTG-LP	88.1 FM	Mount Gilead	Mount Gilead Community Concerts Association	Variety
WMXF	1400 AM	Waynesville	iHM Licenses, LLC	Sports (ESPN)
WMYI	102.5 FM	Hendersonville	iHM Licenses, LLC	Adult hits
WMYN	1420 AM	Mayodan	Truth Broadcasting Corporation	News/Talk
WNAA	90.1 FM	Greensboro	North Carolina Agricultural and Technical State University	Variety
WNBB	97.9 FM	Bayboro	Coastal Carolina Radio, LLC	Classic country
WNBU	94.1 FM	Oriental	Inner Banks Media, LLC	Oldies
WNCA	1570 AM	Siler City	Chatham Broadcasting Co., Inc. of Siler City	News/Talk
WNCB	93.9 FM	Cary	iHM Licenses, LLC	Country
WNCC	104.1 FM	Franklin	Sutton Radiocasting Corporation	Country
WNCT	1070 AM	Greenville	CMG Coastal Carolina, LLC	Beach music
WNCT-FM	107.9 FM	Greenville	Inner Banks Media, LLC	Adult contemporary
WNCU	90.7 FM	Durham	North Carolina Central University	Jazz, Public radio
WNCW	88.7 FM	Spindale	Isothermal Community College	Adult album alternative/Americana
WNIA	89.1 FM	Tarboro	Nash Community College	Variety
WNLV	95.1 FM	Charlotte	K-Love, Inc.	Contemporary Christian (K-Love)
WNNC	1230 AM	Newton	Newton-Conover Communications, Inc.	Oldies
WNNL	103.9 FM	Fuquay-Varina	Radio One Licenses, LLC	Urban contemporary gospel
WNOS	1450 AM	New Bern	CTC Media Group, Inc.	News/Talk/Sports
WNOW	1030 AM	Mint Hill	Norsan Media LLC	Regional Mexican
WNTB	93.7 FM	Topsail Beach	Davis Media, LLC	Country
WOBR-FM	95.3 FM	Wanchese	East Carolina Radio, Inc.	Mainstream rock
WOBX	1530 AM	Wanchese	East Carolina Radio, Inc.	Sports (FSR)
WOBX-FM	98.1 FM	Manteo	East Carolina Radio, Inc.	Adult album alternative
WOGR	1540 AM	Charlotte	Victory Christian Center	Gospel
WOGR-FM	93.3 FM	Salisbury	Victory Christian Center, Inc.	Gospel
WOHS	1390 AM	Shelby	KTC Broadcasting, Inc.	Oldies
WOLS	106.1 FM	Waxhaw	GHB of Waxhaw, Inc.	Regional Mexican
WOPR	88.1 FM	Madison	Church Planters of America	Gospel
WOPT-LP	95.9 FM	Waynesville	Waynesville Christian Radio Corporation	Religious (Radio 74 Internationale)
WOTJ	90.7 FM	Morehead City	Grace Christian School	Conservative religious
WOVE-LP	104.1 FM	Forest City	The Community Empowerment Project Community Development Corp	Variety
WOVV	90.1 FM	Ocracoke	Ocracoke Foundation	Variety
WOXL-FM	96.5 FM	Biltmore Forest	Saga Communications of North Carolina, LLC	Adult contemporary
WPAQ	740 AM	Mount Airy	WPAQ Radio, Inc.	Country/Americana/Bluegrass
WPAW	93.1 FM	Winston-Salem	Audacy License, LLC	Country
WPCM	920 AM	Burlington-Graham	Triad Media Partners, Inc.	Contemporary Christian
WPEG	97.9 FM	Concord	Beasley Media Group Licenses, LLC	Mainstream urban
WPEK	880 AM	Fairview	iHM Licenses, LLC	Sports (ESPN)
WPET	950 AM	Greensboro	Truth Broadcasting Corporation	Religious
WPFJ	1480 AM	Franklin	Radio Training Network, Inc.	Gospel
WPIP	880 AM	Winston-Salem	Berean Christian School	Religious
WPJL	1240 AM	Knightdale	Divine Mercy Radio, Inc.	Catholic
WPLW-FM	96.9 FM	Goldsboro	New Age Communications, Ltd.	Top 40 (CHR)
WPNC-FM	95.9 FM	Plymouth	Durlyn Broadcasting, Co.	Adult contemporary
WPOL	1340 AM	Winston-Salem	Truth Broadcasting Corporation	Gospel
WPTF	680 AM	Raleigh	First State Communications	News/Talk
WPTI	94.5 FM	Eden	iHM Licenses, LLC	News/Talk
WPTL	920 AM	Canton	Skycountry Broadcasting, Inc.	Country
WPTM	102.3 FM	Roanoke Rapids	Byrne Acquisition Group, LLC	Country
WPVM-LP	103.7 FM	Asheville	Friends of WPVM, Inc.	Variety
WPVR-LP	101.3 FM	Mt. Airy	Mt. Airy Community Radio Inc.	Oldies
WPWZ	95.5 FM	Pinetops	First Media Radio, LLC	Mainstream urban
WPYB	1130 AM	Benson	McLamb Broadcasting	Country
WPZS	610 AM	Charlotte	Radio One of North Carolina, LLC	Urban contemporary
WQDK	99.3 FM	Gatesville	Augusta Radio Fellowship Institute, Inc.	Country
WQDR	570 AM	Raleigh	Triangle Broadcast Associates, LLC	Classic rock
WQDR-FM	94.7 FM	Raleigh	Carolina Media Group, Inc.	Country
WQFS	90.9 FM	Greensboro	Guilford College	Variety
WQMG	97.1 FM	Greensboro	Audacy License, LLC	Urban adult contemporary
WQNQ	104.3 FM	Fletcher	iHM Licenses, LLC	Top 40 (CHR)
WQNS	105.1 FM	Woodfin	iHM Licenses, LLC	Mainstream rock
WQOK	97.5 FM	Carrboro	Radio One Licenses, LLC	Urban contemporary
WQSL	92.3 FM	Jacksonville	Dick Broadcasting Company, Inc. of Tennessee	Variety hits
WQSM	98.1 FM	Fayetteville	Cumulus Licensing LLC	Top 40 (CHR)
WQTM	1480 AM	Fair Bluff	Keith Baldwin	Urban gospel
WQZL	101.1 FM	Belhaven	Dick Broadcasting Company, Inc. of Tennessee	Variety hits
WRAE	88.7 FM	Raeford	American Family Association	Religious talk (AFR)
WRAL	101.5 FM	Raleigh	WRAL-FM, Inc.	Adult contemporary
WRCM	91.9 FM	Wingate	Educational Media Foundation	Contemporary Christian (K-Love)
WRCQ	103.5 FM	Dunn	Cumulus Licensing LLC	Mainstream rock
WRCS	970 AM	Ahoskie	WRCS-AM 970, Inc.	Gospel
WRDU	100.7 FM	Wake Forest	iHM Licenses, LLC	Classic rock
WRES-LP	100.7 FM	Asheville	Empowerment Resource Center of Asheville & Buncombe Co. Inc.	Urban/Gospel
WREV	1220 AM	Reidsville	Estuardo Valdemar Rodriguez and Leonor Rodriguez	Spanish-language
WRFX	99.7 FM	Kannapolis	iHM Licenses, LLC	Classic rock
WRGC	540 AM	Sylva	Five-Forty Broadcasting Company, LLC	Adult contemporary
WRHD	94.3 FM	Farmville	Inner Banks Media, LLC	Sports
WRHT	96.3 FM	Morehead City	Inner Banks Media	Talk
WRJD	1410 AM	Durham	Truth Broadcasting Corporation	Spanish Christian
WRKB	1460 AM	Kannapolis	Ford Broadcasting	Southern gospel
WRKV	88.9 FM	Raleigh	Educational Media Foundation	Contemporary Christian (K-Love)
WRLY-LP	93.5 FM	Raleigh	Triangle Access Broadcasting, Inc.	Talk
WRMR	98.7 FM	Jacksonville	Sunrise Broadcasting, LLC	Alternative rock
WRMT	1490 AM	Rocky Mount	First Media Radio, LLC	Gospel
WRNA	1140 AM	China Grove	South Rowan Broadcasting Co., Inc.	Southern gospel
WRNS-FM	95.1 FM	Kinston	Dick Broadcasting Company, Inc. of Tennessee	Country
WRPG-LP	106.9 FM	Pikeville	Pleasant Grove Original Free Will Baptist Church	Religious Teaching
WRQM	90.9 FM	Rocky Mount	WUNC Public Radio, LLC	Public radio
WRRZ	880 AM	Clinton	Sanchez Broadcasting Corporation	Spanish
WRSF	105.7 FM	Columbia	East Carolina Radio, Inc.	Country
WRSH	91.1 FM	Rockingham	Richmond County Board of Education	Educational
WRSV	92.1 FM	Elm City	Northstar Broadcasting Corporation	Mainstream urban
WRTG	1000 AM	Garner	Estuardo Valdemar Rodriguez and Leonor Rodriguez	Spanish variety
WRTP	88.5 FM	Roanoke Rapids	Radio Training Network, Inc.	Christian
WRVS-FM	89.9 FM	Elizabeth City	Elizabeth City State University	Urban/Urban AC
WRXO	1430 AM	Roxboro	Roxboro Broadcasting Company	Classic country
WRYN	89.1 FM	Hickory	American Family Association	Religious Talk (AFR)
WSAT	1280 AM	Salisbury	2B Productions, LLC	Oldies
WSEQ-LP	92.9 FM	Hudson	South Caldwell High School	Variety
WSER-LP	100.1 FM	Lenoir	Caldwell County Public Schools	Variety
WSFL-FM	106.5 FM	New Bern	CMG Coastal Carolina, LLC	Classic rock
WSFM-LP	103.3 FM	Asheville	Friends of Community Radio, Inc.	Variety
WSGE	91.7 FM	Dallas	Gaston College	Adult album alternative
WSGH	1040 AM	Lewisville	Base Communications, Inc.	Spanish
WSIC	1400 AM	Statesville	Iredell Broadcasting, Inc.	News/Talk
WSIF	90.9 FM	Wilkesboro	Isothermal Community College	Adult album alternative/Americana
WSJS	600 AM	Winston-Salem	Truth Broadcasting Corporation	Sports/Talk
WSKY	1230 AM	Asheville	Macon Media, Inc.	Religious
WSME	1120 AM	Camp Lejeune	B&M Broadcasting LLC	Oldies
WSML	1200 AM	Graham	Alamance Media Partners, Inc.	Country
WSMU-LP	106.7 FM	Raleigh	Centro Cristiano el Sermon del Monte	Spanish Religious
WSMW	98.7 FM	Greensboro	Audacy License, LLC	Adult hits
WSMX	1500 AM	Winston-Salem	Blue Ridge Broadcasting Corporation	Contemporary Christian
WSMY	1400 AM	Weldon	Byrne Acquisition Group, LLC	News/Talk/Sports
WSNC	90.5 FM	Winston-Salem	Winston-Salem State University	Jazz
WSOC-FM	103.7 FM	Charlotte	Beasley Media Group Licenses, LLC	Country
WSOE	89.3 FM	Elon	Elon College	Alternative
WSPC	1010 AM	Albemarle	Stanly Communications, Inc.	News/Talk/Sports
WSQL	1240 AM	Brevard	Gonuts Media LLC	Classic hits
WSRP	910 AM	Jacksonville	Estuardo Valdemar Rodriguez & Leonor Rodriguez	Spanish
WSSG	1300 AM	Goldsboro	Eastern Airwaves, LLC	Urban contemporary
WSSY-LP	107.9 FM	Greensboro	Greater Greensboro Broadcasting Team	R&B/Urban Gospel
WSTK	104.5 FM	Aurora	Media East, LLC	Classic country
WSTP	1490 AM	Salisbury	2B Productions, LLC	Classic country
WSTS	100.9 FM	Fairmont	Truth Broadcasting Corporation	Southern gospel/Christian
WSVM	1490 AM	Valdese	Main Street Broadcasting, Inc.	Adult hits
WSYD	1300 AM	Mount Airy	Granite City Broadcasting, Inc.	Oldies
WTAB	1370 AM	Tabor City	WTAB Media, Inc.	Full service
WTCG	870 AM	Mount Holly	Bible Clarity	News/Talk
WTDA-LP	96.5 FM	Williamston	Martin County Tourism Development Authority	Oldies
WTEB	89.3 FM	New Bern	Craven Community College	News/Talk (Public radio)
WTGX	90.5 FM	Williamston	Pathway Christian Academy, Inc.	Christian (Go Mix! Radio)
WTIB	103.7 FM	Williamston	Inner Banks Media	News/Talk
WTIJ-LP	100.7 FM	Bryson City	Grace Christian Academy	Christian
WTIK	1310 AM	Durham	A&B Media LLC	Regional Mexican
WTJY	89.5 FM	Asheboro	Positive Alternative Radio, Inc.	Southern gospel
WTKF	107.1 FM	Atlantic	Atlantic Ridge Telecasters, Inc.	News/Talk/Sports
WTKK	106.1 FM	Knightdale	iHM Licenses, LLC	News/Talk
WTLK	1570 AM	Taylorsville	Apple City Broadcasting, Inc.	Southern gospel
WTMT	105.9 FM	Weaverville	Saga Communications of North Carolina, LLC	Classic rock
WTOB	980 AM	Winston-Salem	Southern Broadcast Media LLC	Classic hits
WTOE	1470 AM	Spruce Pine	Mountain Valley Media, Inc.	Oldies
WTPT	93.3 FM	Forest City	Audacy License, LLC	Active rock
WTQR	104.1 FM	Winston-Salem	iHM Licenses, LLC	Country
WTRG	97.9 FM	Gaston	Byrne Acquisition Group, LLC	Classic hits
WTRU	830 AM	Kernersville	Truth Broadcasting	Christian talk
WTSB	1090 AM	Selma	Truth Broadcasting Corporation	Full service
WTXY	1540 AM	Whiteville	Audiotraxx Media Partners LLC	Classic hits
WTZQ	1600 AM	Hendersonville	Flat Rock Multimedia, LLC	Oldies/Adult standards
WUAG	103.1 FM	Greensboro	University of North Carolina at Greensboro	Variety
WUAW	88.3 FM	Erwin	Central Carolina Community College	Top 40 (CHR)
WUBN-LP	106.9 FM	Wilson	Miracle Christian International Life Center	Religious Teaching
WUIN	98.3 FM	Oak Island	Davis Media, LLC	Adult album alternative
WUIT-LP	90.3 FM	Durham	Ministerio Guerrero de Jesucristo Internacional, Inc.	Spanish religious
WUKS	107.7 FM	St. Pauls	Beasley Media Group, LLC	Classic hip hop
WULC-LP	95.9 FM	Hendersonville	Luz Para Hoy Radio	Spanish Christian
WUNC	91.5 FM	Chapel Hill	WUNC Public Radio, LLC	Public radio
WUND-FM	88.9 FM	Columbia	WUNC Public Radio, LLC	Public radio
WUNW-FM	91.1 FM	Welcome	WUNC Public Radio, LLC	Public radio
WURE-LP	105.9 FM	Troy	Uwharrie Mountain Radio	Variety
WURI	88.9 FM	Manteo	WUNC Public Radio, LLC	Classical
WVBS	1470 AM	Burgaw	Grace Christian School	Religious
WVBZ	105.7 FM	Clemmons	iHM Licenses, LLC	Mainstream rock
WVFV-LP	95.9 FM	Roanoke Rapids	Victory Baptist Church of Roanoke Rapids, Inc	Easy listening
WVOD	99.1 FM	Manteo	Jeffrey T. Testa, Trustee of JAM Media Solutions, LLC	Adult album alternative
WVOE	1590 AM	Chadbourn	Ebony Enterprises, Inc.	Black gospel
WVOT	1420 AM	Wilson	Kingdom Expansion Corporation	Black gospel
WVRA	107.3 FM	Enfield	Liberty University, Inc.	Contemporary Christian
WVRD	90.5 FM	Zebulon	Liberty University, Inc.	Contemporary Christian
WVRH	94.3 FM	Norlina	Liberty University, Inc.	Contemporary Christian
WVRL	88.3 FM	Elizabeth City	Liberty University, Inc.	Contemporary Christian
WVRP	91.1 FM	Roanoke Rapids	Liberty University, Inc.	Contemporary Christian
WWCU	95.3 FM	Dillsboro	Western Carolina University	Variety
WWDR	1080 AM	Murfreesboro	Byrne Acquisition Group, LLC	Urban adult contemporary
WWFJ	88.1 FM	East Fayetteville	Grace Missionary Baptist Church d/b/a Grace Christian School	Gospel/Christian rock
WWGP	1050 AM	Sanford	Sandhills Broadcasting Group LLC	Oldies
WWIL-FM	90.5 FM	Wilmington	Carolina Christian Radio	Christian
WWLV	94.1 FM	Lexington	Educational Media Foundation	Contemporary Christian (K-Love)
WWMC	1010 AM	Kinston	Eastern Airwaves, LLC	Urban contemporary gospel
WWMY	102.3 FM	Beech Mountain	High Country Adventures, LLC	Country
WWNB	1490 AM	New Bern	CTC Media Group, Inc.	Sports (ESPN)
WWNC	570 AM	Asheville	iHM Licenses, LLC	News/Talk
WWNT	1380 AM	Winston-Salem	Delmarva Educational Association	Spanish language
WWOL	780 AM	Forest City	Holly Springs Baptist Broadcasting Co., Inc.	Southern gospel
WWQQ-FM	101.3 FM	Wilmington	Cumulus Licensing LLC	Country
WWQT	1160 AM	Tryon	The Power Foundation	Southern Gospel (The Life FM)
WWQY	90.3 FM	Yadkin	The Power Foundation	Southern Gospel (The Life FM)
WWWC	1240 AM	Wilkesboro	Foothills Media, Inc.	Religious
WXBE	88.3 FM	Beaufort	American Family Association	Religious Talk (AFR)
WXDU	88.7 FM	Durham	Duke University	Variety
WXIT	1200 AM	Blowing Rock	High Country Adventures, LLC	Top 40 (CHR)
WXKL	1290 AM	Sanford	Macadell & Associates, Inc.	Gospel
WXNC	1060 AM	Monroe	Norsan Consulting and Management, Inc.	Regional Mexican
WXQR-FM	105.5 FM	Jacksonville	Dick Broadcasting Company, Inc. of Tennessee	Active rock
WXRC	95.7 FM	Hickory	Pacific Broadcasting Group, Inc.	Classic hits
WXRI	91.3 FM	Winston-Salem	Positive Alternative Radio, Inc.	Southern gospel
WXTZ-LP	103.3 FM	Yadkinville	Yadkinville Media Inc	Variety
WXYC	89.3 FM	Chapel Hill	Student Educational Broadcasting, Inc.	Variety
WYAL	1280 AM	Scotland Neck	Sky City Communications, Inc.	Talk/Personality
WYAY	106.3 FM	Bolivia	Maryland Media One, LLC	Classic alternative
WYBH	91.1 FM	Fayetteville	Bible Broadcasting Network, Inc.	Religious (Bible Broadcasting Network)
WYBJ	90.7 FM	Newton Grove	Grace Missionary Baptist Church, Inc.	Christian contemporary
WYCV	900 AM	Granite Falls	Freedom Broadcasting Corporation	Gospel
WYDU	1160 AM	Red Springs	WYDU Broadcasting Inc.	Religious
WYFL	92.5 FM	Henderson	Bible Broadcasting Network, Inc.	Conservative religious (Bible Broadcasting Network)
WYFQ	930 AM	Charlotte	Bible Broadcasting Network, Inc.	Conservative religious (Bible Broadcasting Network)
WYFQ-FM	93.5 FM	Wadesboro	Bible Broadcasting Network, Inc.	Conservative religious (Bible Broadcasting Network)
WYHW	104.5 FM	Wilmington	Bible Broadcasting Network, Inc.	Conservative religious (Bible Broadcasting Network)
WYLT-LP	100.3 FM	Rocky Mount	Action Community Television, Inc.	R&B/Smooth Jazz
WYMY	101.1 FM	Burlington	Carolina Radio Group, Inc.	Regional Mexican
WYNA	104.9 FM	Calabash	iHM Licenses, LLC	Adult hits
WYNC	1540 AM	Yanceyville	Semora Broadcasting	Religious
WYQS	90.5 FM	Mars Hill	Western North Carolina Public Radio, Inc.	Public radio / Classical / Jazz
WYRN	1480 AM	Louisburg	A and D Broadcasting, Inc.	Urban contemporary gospel/urban oldies
WYSR	1590 AM	High Point	Iglesia Cristo Reyna Inc.	Spanish variety
WYTR	88.1 FM	Robbins	Truth Media Incorporated	Christian
WYZD	1560 AM	Dobson	Gospel Broadcasting, Inc.	Christian
WZAX	99.3 FM	Nashville	First Media Radio, LLC	Rhythmic Hot AC
WZBO	1260 AM	Edenton	Lawrence Loesch and Margaret Loesch	Classic country
WZCO	89.9 FM	Chadbourn	Columbus County Schools	Grade School (K-12)
WZDG	88.5 FM	Scotts Hill	Carolina Christian Radio	Southern gospel
WZED-LP	105.9 FM	Newport	Crystal Coast Community Radio	Classical/Jazz
WZFX	99.1 FM	Whiteville	Beasley Media Group, LLC	Mainstream urban
WZGM	1350 AM	Black Mountain	HRN Broadcasting, Inc.	Classic country
WZGO	91.1 FM	Aurora	Pathway Christian Academy	Christian (Go Mix! Radio)
WZGV	730 AM	Cramerton	2G Media, Inc.	Silent
WZJS	100.7 FM	Banner Elk	High Country Adventures, LLC	Classic hits
WZKB	94.3 FM	Wallace	Carolina's Christian Broadcasting, Inc.	Spanish
WZKT	97.7 FM	Walnut Creek	New Age Communications, Inc.	Country
WZKY	1580 AM	Albemarle	Stanly Communications, Inc.	Oldies
WZMB	91.3 FM	Greenville	East Carolina University Student Media Board	Alternative rock
WZNB	88.5 FM	New Bern	Craven Community College	Classical
WZOO	700 AM	Asheboro	RCR of Randolf County, Ltd.	Classic hits
WZPE	90.1 FM	Bath	Educational Information Corporation	Classical
WZPR	92.3 FM	Nags Head	Jeffrey T. Testa, Trustee of JAM Media Solutions, LLC	Sports
WZQS	90.5 FM	Cullowhee	Western Carolina University	Public radio / Classical / Jazz
WZRF-LP	99.3 FM	Wilmington	Neptune Radio Incorporated	Rock
WZRI	89.3 FM	Spring Lake	Educational Media Foundation	Contemporary worship (Air1)
WZRN	90.5 FM	Norlina	Pathway Christian Academy, Inc.	Christian (Go Mix! Radio)
WZRU	90.1 FM	Garysburg	Pathway Christian Academy, Inc.	Christian (Go Mix! Radio)
WZUP	97.5 FM	Washington	Media East, LLC	Classic country

== Defunct ==
- WBIG
- WCLY
- WCMS-FM
- WCRY
- WDJD-LP
- WEGO
- WGIV
- WGSB
- WGTL (Kannapolis, North Carolina)
- WGTM (Spindale, North Carolina)
- WGTM (Wilson, North Carolina)
- WJBX
- WHCR-LP
- WJOS
- WJPI
- WJSL-LP
- WLTT
- WMBL
- WOOW
- WPTP-LP
- WQNX
- WRDK
- WRNS
- WSDC
- WSHP-LP
- WSPF
- WTOW
- WTRQ
- WVBS
- WVCB
- WVOT
- WVSP
- WWIL
- WWNG

== See also ==
- North Carolina media
  - List of newspapers in North Carolina
  - List of television stations in North Carolina
  - Media of cities in North Carolina: Asheville, Charlotte, Durham, Fayetteville, Greensboro, High Point, Raleigh, Wilmington, Winston-Salem

== Bibliography ==
- Jack Alicoate, ed. (1939), "North Carolina", Radio Annual, New York: Radio Daily, OCLC 2459636 – via Internet Archive
- "AM Stations in the U.S.: North Carolina", Radio Annual Television Year Book, New York: Radio Television Daily, 1963, OCLC 10512375 – via Internet Archive
- Philip McFee; Wiley J. Williams (2006), "Radio Broadcasting", in William S. Powell (ed.), Encyclopedia of North Carolina, University of North Carolina Press

== Images ==
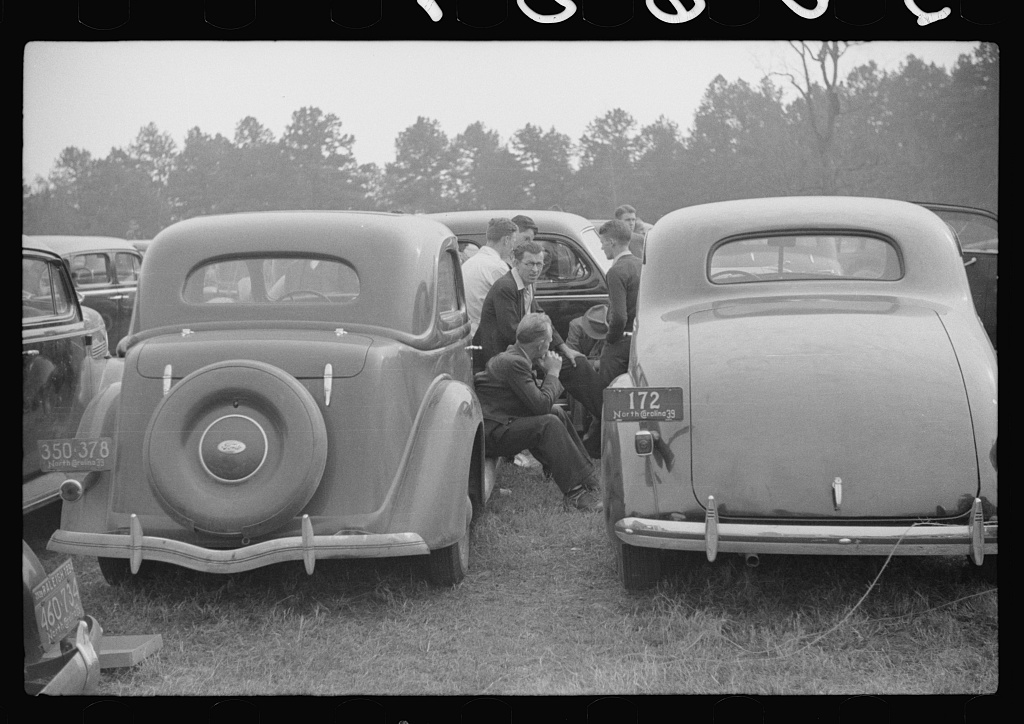
Radio listeners in Durham during football game (Duke University vs. North Carolina), circa 1939

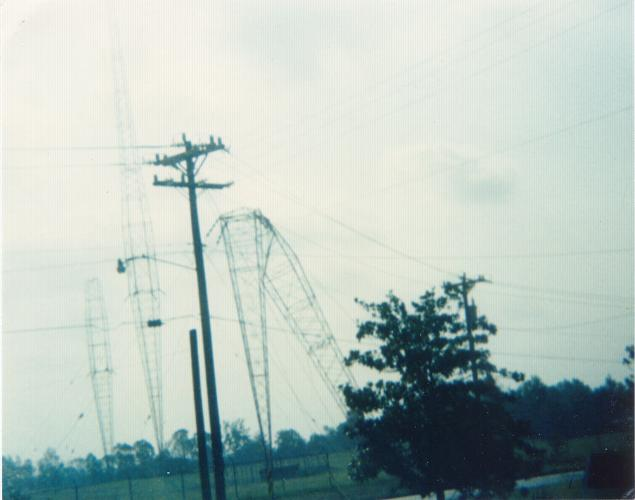
WBT-AM tower in Charlotte area after Hurricane Hugo, 1989
