= KCTO =

Radio station in Cleveland, Missouri, United States

- Cleveland, Missouri; United States
- Broadcast area: Kansas City metropolitan area
- Frequency: 1160 kHz
- Branding: Radio Maria

Programming
- Language: Spanish
- Format: Christian

Ownership
- Owner: Alpine Broadcasting Corporation
- Sister stations: KCXL

History
- First air date: 2006

Technical information
- Licensing authority: FCC
- Facility ID: 136386
- Class: B
- Power: 5,000 watts day 230 watts night
- Transmitter coordinates: 38°40′26″N 94°36′28.8″W
- Translators: 99.3 K257DZ (Kansas City); 100.5 K263BU (Kansas City)

Links
- Public license information: Public file; LMS

KCTO (1160 AM) is a radio station licensed to serve Cleveland, Missouri, United States. The station is owned by the Alpine Broadcasting Corporation.

KCTO broadcasts to the greater Kansas City area simulcasting Spanish Catholic programming from Radio Maria. KCTO occasionally breaks away from this schedule to carry coverage of Kansas City Mavericks ice hockey in English.

The station was assigned the call sign "KCTO" by the Federal Communications Commission (FCC) on July 24, 2003.

== History ==
KCTO signed on in 2006 as a simulcast of sister station KCXL 1140 AM, with a talk format.

KCTO upgraded its power in 2009, and, in March 2010, broke away from simulcasting KCXL while continuing to offer a talk format during the week and Adult Standards on weekends. Other programming included football games from Lee's Summit High School and simulcasts of Catholic programming from JPEG Network.

In March 2011 it flipped to Regional Mexican as “La Super X” and later “La Poderosa 1160”.

In February 2016, the moniker was changed to “La Mega 1160”, with a completely different air staff and management.

In 2017, the station became the Spanish-language home of the Kansas City Chiefs, previously heard on KDTD 1340 AM. Chiefs games are produced through Tico Productions and also air on KHLT-FM in Wichita.

As of January 2020, KCTO flipped from La Mega to Catholic programming in Spanish, simulcasting Radio Maria's Spanish feed. Chiefs games in Spanish moved to KCWJ (1030 AM) for the 2020 season.

Later in early 2020, KCTO began, during the morning hours, broadcasting Hosanna Christian Network (also heard full time on KWJP 89.7 FM in Paola, Kansas, with a format blending Spanish and English Contemporary Christian music, Regional Mexican music with Christian lyrics, and Urban contemporary gospel. The rest of the time, KCTO simulcasted Radio Maria, offering a Spanish Catholic format. Hosanna Christian Network's time expanded by one hour to 7am to 12pm starting in November 2020.

As of February 2021 the station switched from Radio Maria to audio from CatholicTV, offering Catholic programming in English, while Hosanna Christian Network was still heard during the morning hours.

As of Sunday, March 7, 2021, Hosanna Christian Network expanded its time on KCTO by 14 hours, now beginning at 5pm and broadcasting until noon. KCTO once again simulcasts programming from Radio Maria from noon to 5pm.

Starting in September 2021, KCTO began carrying Kansas City Mavericks games in English.

Hosanna Christian Network stopped broadcasting on KCTO at 11:59pm on June 30, 2022. KCTO became Spanish Radio Maria 22 hours per day, with the remaining 2 hours simulcasting “The Vine Connection”, an English Urban Gospel internet radio station based in Washington, North Carolina, formerly heard on WTOW, WSTK and WEGG.

By 2023 The Vine had ceased broadcasting on the station and it went to Radio Maria full-time.
