= WKOO =

- Rose Hill, North Carolina; United States
- Broadcast area: Duplin County; Goldsboro; Jacksonville; Kinston; New Bern; Wilmington
- Frequency: 710 kHz
- Branding: 100.5 Kix FM

Programming
- Format: Classic country

Ownership
- Owner: Norman and Teresa McCauley; (Mega Media, Inc.)

History
- First air date: August 7, 1975
- Former call signs: WEGG (1970–2020)

Technical information
- Licensing authority: FCC
- Facility ID: 17745
- Class: D
- Power: 2,500 watts day
- Transmitter coordinates: 34°51′48″N 78°2′16″W
- Translator: 100.5 W263DF (Rose Hill)

Links
- Public license information: Public file; LMS
- Webcast: Listen Live
- Website: www.1005kixfm.com

WKOO (710 AM, "100.5 Kix FM") is an American radio station licensed to serve the community of Rose Hill, North Carolina. The station broadcasts classic country music.

== Coverage ==
WKOO's main signal on 710 AM reaches all of Duplin County as well as the cities of Benson, Burgaw, Clinton, Elizabethtown, Goldsboro, Greenville, Kinston, Jacksonville, New Bern, Smithfield, and Wilmington. Depending on weather conditions, WKOO can be heard as far away as Durham, Fayetteville, Raleigh, and even Florence (South Carolina).

Similar to radio stations such as WOR in New York City and KIRO in Seattle, 710 AM is Class A clear-channel station.

== History ==
The original construction permit for 710 AM in Rose Hill, North Carolina, was applied for on August 13, 1966, by Duplin County Broadcasters, founded by Jeff Barnes Wilson, and was granted on June 9, 1970. The callsign WEGG was assigned on December 28, 1970. The call letters were intended to reflect the poultry industry, which was next door to the radio station, as well as the local landmark, The World's Largest Frying Pan. WEGG first began broadcasting in August 1975 with 250 watts daytime-only.

=== The Wonderful Egg 710 ===
WEGG started as a country music station, eventually becoming full service, and began incorporating Southern Gospel music as well. WEGG was originally branded as “The Wonderful Egg”. The station carried programming from ABC News, The North Carolina News Network, and Southern Farm Network. James Kenan High School football and Wake Forest sports were part of the programming as well. Since much of the sporting events, especially High School Football, occurred after the nightly sign-off. WEGG would broadcast the play-by-play of the game, the next day.

The station operates at 710 AM, which is designated a clear channel, in which WOR in New York City has priority over the frequency in the night hours. One of the liners on WEGG was "Clear Channel Radio 71", even though the station itself is not classified as a clear channel station.

In 1981, WEGG began airing Gospel music and Bible Teaching programs seven days a week in addition to country music. Charlie Robinson hosted a daily afternoon program called All Gospel For All People, which featured traditional black gospel and coined the call letters as standing for "Where Everyone Glorifies God". “Thru The Bible Radio” with Dr. J. Vernon McGee was part of the programming throughout Wilson's ownership of the station. Jerry Falwell's program was also a part of the lineup. Many local churches aired their ministries on the station as well.

In 1993, Duplin County Broadcasters added FM sister station WBSY 104.7 FM, which allowed WEGG's programming to broadcast 24 hours a day.

=== Country Bear ===
In 1995, Jeff Barnes Wilson died, and Duplin County Broadcasters sold WEGG and sister station, WBSY, to Conner Media Corporation on June 7, 1996. Shortly afterwards, WEGG & WBSY became “Country Bear”, simulcasting WZBR 97.7 in Goldsboro.

=== All Gospel Radio and La Caliente ===
In 1999, WEGG and WBSY broke away from the simulcast. WEGG flipped to traditional black gospel. One of WEGG's notable personalities during this time was Patricia "Ann" Pratt. WBSY became a part of the Go Mix! Network, before becoming regional Mexican with the call letters WZUP, and relocating to Kinston, North Carolina. Though WBSY was no longer simulcasting WEGG, WEGG continued to use invoice forms, in which the letterhead read, "WEGG 710 AM / WBSY 104.7 FM" until 2014.

In June 2005, WEGG flipped to a regional Mexican format. The format change resulted in a backlash against the station, and a local minister organized a committee to bring gospel music back to the radio station, which failed. WEGG also received threats of the NAACP potentially getting involved.

=== Christian formats ===
In December 2005, WEGG dropped the regional Mexican format, and became a part of the Fundamental Broadcasting Network, an Independent Fundamental Baptist radio network based in Newport, North Carolina. During this time, WEGG was granted a construction permit for a power increase to 2,500 watts.

After Fundamental Broadcasting Network elected not to renew its lease in July 2006, Conner Media Corporation intended to close WEGG. However, general manager Suzanne Wilson, in an attempt to save the radio station, brought back the traditional black gospel music format, along with the former on-air personality, Ann Faison. WEGG also began carrying IRN/USA Radio Network news. Ultimately, Conner Media Corporation decided to complete the power upgrade and replaced the original Collins 300G transmitter with a Broadcast Electronics AM2.5E transmitter. As soon as the upgrade was completed, WEGG was put up for sale and remained on the market until 2014.

In October 2007, Media East built WSTK 104.5 FM and acquired WLGT 98.3 FM. These two stations, along with WEGG, became known as "The Light", with a Contemporary Christian Music format under LMA, broadcasting from a studio above the Pepsi Store in New Bern, North Carolina.

In March 2008, The Light brand was dropped from WSTK and WLGT. WSTK, WLGT, and WEGG were rebranded as "Glory Radio", with all three stations operating separately. WLGT 98.3 FM and WEGG 710 AM offered a Traditional Black Gospel format, while WSTK 104.5 FM offered a Southern Gospel format. In June 2008, WEGG and WSTK were rebranded with the moniker “Joy”, offering a traditional black gospel music format, simulcasting 1490 WWIL (AM).

In October 2008, WWIL terminated their LMA with WEGG and WSTK; WSTK went silent, while WEGG reverted to branding as "Glory Radio" with a traditional black gospel music format, now broadcasting from the WEGG studio in Rose Hill, North Carolina.

In May 2009, WSTK resumed broadcasting, simulcasting WEGG. WEGG added a new FM translator W240BN at 95.9 FM. W240BN was located on the 710 AM tower and broadcast with 250 watts of power. The station was rebranded as “The Gospel Superstation”.

In January 2011, WEGG was branded “Your Christian Radio 710 & 95.9” with a traditional black gospel music format. 104.5 FM WSTK also used the same moniker but offered a Christian Talk format.

Sermons from local ministers were broadcast daily. Local ministers also participated in the "Noon Day Prayer" each day at noon, during which time a local minister would offer a 15 to 20-minute prayer, and afterward, listeners could call in and request prayer from the minister or share a testimony. The station also featured church announcements and local obituaries read throughout the morning.

From March 2011 to December 2011, WEGG rebroadcast the audio from "The Great Awakening" revival services at The River Church in Tampa, Florida, with an immediate repeat overnight.

In early 2013, W240BN was relocated, changed frequencies, sold, and eventually became WHQR's Classical HQR 96.7. A new translator, W263BE at 100.5 FM, was launched in its stead, broadcasting from a taller tower outside of Wallace to provide improved reception in Duplin County.

=== Surge 100 ===
In August 2014, Ken Santarelli, former co-owner of "The Surge of SoCal", a then-defunct Dance Hits formatted internet radio station based in Los Angeles, California, began talks with Conner Media Corporation about possibly purchasing the radio station. On October 22, 2014, Surge Media, LLC was organized, and an agreement was proposed that Surge Media, LLC would purchase FM translator W263BE, and operate WEGG via local marketing agreement for a time, and then Surge Media, LLC would purchase WEGG as well. The station would use the Surge Radio brand. Ken Santarelli and Christian Mergliano have the Surge Radio brand trademarked with the United States Patents and Trademarks Office and have been using the brand since April 2005.

On November 1, 2014, Conner Media Corporation entered into an LMA with Surge Media, LLC. On November 4, 2014, an application was filed with the FCC to transfer ownership of translator W263BE from Conner Media Corporation to Surge Media, LLC. On November 15, 2014, Surge Media, LLC flipped the format rhythmic hot adult contemporary as “Surge 100”, under guidance by Michael Oaks, owner of internet radio station Energy 98, former Program Director at KNRJ-Energy 92.7 & 101.1 in Phoenix, Arizona and former Music Director at KVBE-Vibe 94.5 in Las Vegas, Nevada. Your Christian Radio 710 and 100.5 signed off with "You Can Search" by the Angelic Gospel Singers, and Surge 100 signed on at 2 p.m. with "Hello" by Martin Solveig & Dragonette. WEGG also began streaming online for the first time in its history.

Surge 100 immediately began offering mix shows from some of the former DJs who were a part of the lineup on The Surge of SoCal. These included DJ Mirage and DJ Beatz from the Los Angeles area, Garage Sound System from Moscow (formerly on the Europa Plus network in Russia), and Rohit Bangera of Mumbai (currently living in College Park, Maryland, just outside Washington, D.C.).

After the format change, the radio station received many calls from former listeners hoping to get the gospel format back on the air. However, Ken Santarelli, owner and manager of Surge Media, refused, stating that the new format was to reach a larger group of people, better serve the needs of the community, and build a stronger income to help keep the radio station alive. WEGG continued to offer Gospel music and Christian talk programming from local ministries on Sundays.

As of January 2015, “Garage Sound System” from Moscow on Saturday nights was replaced by DJ Perry from Phoenix, Arizona, and “House of Grooves Radio” with Miss Kay Dee and Audio Jacker. Both of these programs were originally on The Surge of SoCal. Surge also added a mix show from Justin Dohman. “The Listening Room with Mikeo” (Michael Oaks), which also runs on Mike's other stations Energy 98 and KXJM-HD2-Too Wild 107.5-HD2, was added on Sunday nights. “The Listening Room” plays tomorrow's potential Dance Hits and allows listeners to rate the music. Gospel Tunes with Robert Osborne (formerly of the now-defunct WTRQ in Warsaw, North Carolina) was added to the Sunday lineup. Osborne also hosted another program on Saturdays, titled “The Fantastic Voyage”, which blends the regular playlist with more of an Urban Contemporary flavor.

After January 2, 2015, DJ Beatz, who was a resident DJ at The Surge of SoCal since 2012, was replaced by “Seduction Mixshow” with Mickey Bono of The Beat Thrillerz, another program that was formerly broadcast on The Surge of SoCal.

On January 7, 2015, the FCC approved the sale of FM translator W263BE to Surge Media, LLC. On January 13, 2015, Conner Media Corporation closed on the sale of FM translator W263BE 100.5 FM to Surge Media, LLC. Starting the week of January 27, 2015, Surge 100 began adding dance currents during the daytime.

In late February 2015, WEGG, once again, began airing content from Southern Farm Network, after 20 years. At the beginning of April 2015, WEGG ended its affiliation with IRN/USA Radio Network and had no news service for the rest of the month. WEGG began carrying North Carolina News Network once again, on May 11, 2015.

In Fall 2015, WEGG began broadcasting high school football, which had been absent from the station since 1996. WEGG covered selected games at Wallace-Rose Hill High School, James Kenan High School, East Duplin High School, Clinton High School, and Harrells Christian Academy. On December 4, 2015; WEGG broadcast the Wallace-Rose Hill High School vs. James Kenan High School playoff championship game, nicknamed the "Duplin County Super Bowl," where Wallace-Rose Hill High School won the championship.

In October 2015, WEGG closed the original studio and office on Highway 117 just north of Rose Hill and opened a new office on Main Street in Downtown Wallace. Shortly after, Robert Osborne discontinued his Saturday afternoon program and took over weekday afternoons. Amber Rose became the midday personality, and Turtle took the evenings.

From December 2015 to August 2016, WEGG's programming was simulcast daily from 2 pm-8 am on WDJS 1430 AM in Mount Olive, North Carolina. This was to keep WEGG's programming available to the northern portions of Duplin County (where the 100.5 translator signal wasn't as clear) as well as the larger cities of Kinston and Goldsboro during the times when WEGG's 710 AM signal was either off the air during the night hours (due to its daytimer status) or overlapped by WOR before sunset.

On March 1, 2016, WSTK began once again simulcasting WEGG. WSTK had, for approximately three years, been operating a Traditional Black Gospel format as "The Vine Connection" under LMA, but the format failed to sustain the station and was dropped. Surge Media, LLC then entered into an LMA with Media East, LLC to operate WSTK. The branding was planned to be completely adjusted from "Surge 100" to “Surge Radio” within the first week, but due to the passing of Ken Santarelli's mother on March 3, necessitating an extended trip out of town, the adjustment of on-air imaging was delayed.

In late April 2016, Amber Rose quit and was replaced by Heather B. of CHOM-FM/97.7, who handled middays on WEGG via voice-tracking. Turtle, shortly after, left the evening shift and was replaced by Lisa G, who is also an on-air personality with internet radio station Energy 98.

On August 10, 2016, Surge Media, LLC announced that it would be ending its LMA with Media East, LLC and would cease broadcasting on WSTK as of August 31, 2016, at 11:59;p.m. Surge Media, LLC was unable to generate any revenue from that station and determined that it was not a viable option to continue operating the signal.

On August 31, 2016, after playing “This Is How It Goes” by Haley, WEGG, and WSTK went to dead air. After a few minutes, WEGG ran an EAS test and resumed operation. WSTK continued broadcasting dead air until the transmitter was shut off sometime later. The next day WEGG relaunched with a Dance Hits format, with music programmed by Ken Santarelli, owner of Surge Media. The focus of WEGG became more on its presence as an internet radio station rather than a community-focused radio station, as Duplin County had shown little interest in community programming.

On October 30, 2016, WEGG began simulcasting its programming in the overnight hours on KCXL/1140 AM & 102.9 FM in Kansas City, Missouri. Shortly after, Ken Santarelli left Duplin County to build Surge's presence in Kansas City.

On January 10, 2017, at 11:59 p.m., Surge Radio ceased broadcasting on WEGG with the final song, “So This Is Goodbye” (Pink Ganter Remix) by William Fitzsimmons. Immediately afterward, WEGG began stunting airing a loop of the song “Data & Picard” by Pogo with a message, in Ken Santarelli's voice, saying "This is WEGG and W263BE Rose Hill. If you're looking for Surge Radio, you'll need to hike it on over to surge radio dot org..." followed by a statement that changes between each song stating that a different format was coming on Monday morning at 7:15, leaving no definitive answer about what the new format would be. Some of the statements made references to radio brands that previously existed in Duplin County (i.e. "WTRQ returns to Duplin County airwaves Monday morning..." or "There's going to be a lot more Power in Duplin County Monday morning...") while others made references to radio brands currently in existence in the nearby Jacksonville/New Bern/Greenville market (i.e. "Duplin County will get to know Bob..." or "Duplin County will be kissed"), and yet others simply stated a specific format was coming (i.e. "There's a whole new country coming to Duplin County..." or "This just in, the news comes to Duplin County...").

Surge Radio continued to broadcast part-time on KCXL in Kansas City until July 2017 and continued streaming online as an internet radio station until November 2020.

=== 100.5 The Dream ===
On January 16, 2017, at 7:15 a.m., after playing The Black American National Anthem, WEGG became Rhythmic Oldies as “100.5 The Dream”, with the first song being Ain't No Stoppin' Us Now by McFadden & Whitehead. The Dream was a partnership between Surge Media and Unique Media. Unique Media's Ray Boney a.k.a. Big Ray Da Hit Man (formerly of WZFX) became the program director. With January 16 being Martin Luther King Jr. Day, WEGG hosted a remote from the NAACP-Duplin County branch's Martin Luther King Jr. Day Celebration at the Lois G. Brit Agricultural Center in Kenansville.

On January 23, 2017, an application was filed with the FCC to transfer ownership of WEGG from Conner Media Corporation to Surge Media, LLC.

On April 1, 2017, Ken Santarelli's Surge Media, LLC acquired WEGG from Conner Media Corporation. Robert Osborne became WEGG's General Manager.

Shortly after the acquisition, Unique Media fell into financial difficulties and began failing to support the radio station. WEGG began to severely deplete Surge Media's resources, to the point that Surge had to terminate its time brokerage agreement with KCXL in Kansas City. Surge Media traded the audio processing equipment they installed at KCXL's FM translators in exchange for an additional month and a half of airtime for Surge Radio in Kansas City. The partnership with Unique Media was terminated on June 30, 2017.

=== The Soul of Duplin County ===
On July 1, 2017, Ray Boney exited as program director, and, as a result, WEGG dropped The Dream moniker. The Dream was taken off the air at 3 p.m., and WEGG played a loop of Alice Cooper's Welcome To My Nightmare for the rest of the afternoon. Later in the evening, the playlist was restored, but with no IDs except for a legal ID at the top of the hour.

By the following Tuesday, all new imaging was produced, using the callsign, WEGG, as the moniker, with the slogan "The Soul of Duplin County." Jay Starling mornings and Robert Osborne afternoons remained in place, and the format remained mostly the same but with a lot of the Hip Hop elements removed. Robert Osborne took the reins as program director in addition to his duties as general manager.

=== The Vine Connection ===
Owner Ken Santarelli accepted an LMA offer from The Vine Connection based in Washington, North Carolina since the Rhythmic Oldies format was generating less than 20% of the station's operating costs. The Vine Connection had also been operating WSTK 104.5 FM via LMA from June 2013 to March 2016 and again since March 2017, and previously operated WTOW 1320 AM from February 2005 to February 2008 and December 2011 to June 2013. Robert Osborne chose to exit as general manager.

On September 1, 2017, WEGG became Urban Contemporary Gospel “The Vine Connection” with Mae Rodgers as program director, once again simulcasting with WSTK 104.5 FM. WEGG's office in Wallace was closed shortly after.

On June 5, 2018, an application was filed to transfer WEGG and W263BE back to Conner Media Corporation for $50,000. Surge Media is selling WEGG back to Conner Media at a loss, having purchased WEGG for $120,000 and W263BE for $80,000. The deal also included a construction permit for a new translator. Ken Santarelli of Surge Media cited financial difficulties, the passing of his father, and plans to move to Viña del Mar, Chile, as reasons for selling it back to Conner Media. Ken Santarelli had not lived in the area since late 2016, and even said in an article published by a Kansas City area health club that living in Duplin County, North Carolina is "a fate worse than death."

On May 30, 2019, the sale from Surge Media, LLC back to Conner Media Corporation was finalized.

=== 100.5 Kix FM ===
On July 1, 2019, WEGG broke away from its simulcast with WSTK and flipped to a classic country music format, as “100.5 Kix FM” with Clay McCauley as program director. Clay McCauley had previously hosted a Sunday program on WEGG called “The Big Kahuna's Gospel Train” from 2009 to 2017.

On July 1, 2020, the call letters were changed to WKOO, marking the first time the callsign has been changed in the history of the radio station.

On May 18, 2022, a petition was filed with the FCC to transfer ownership of WKOO from Conner Media Corporation to Clay McCauley's Mega Media. The sale, for $100,000, was consummated on September 8, 2022.
