= WIID =

WIID may refer to:

- WIID (FM), a radio station (88.1 FM) licensed to serve Rodanthe, North Carolina, United States; WIID is a community radio station playing a country music format as OBX Country. See List of radio stations in North Carolina
- Kemayoran Airport (ICAO code WIID)
