= 2014 Quicken Loans 400 =

2014 Quicken Loans 400 Challenge
Race details
- Race 15 of 36 in the 2014 NASCAR Sprint Cup Series
- Date: June 15, 2014
- Location: Michigan International Speedway, Brooklyn, Michigan
- Course: Permanent racing facility
- Course length: 2 miles (3.2 km)
- Distance: 200 laps, 400 mi (643.737 km)
- Weather: Sunny with a temperature around 76 °F (24 °C); wind out of the SSE at 13 miles per hour (21 km/h).
- Average speed: 143.441 mph (230.846 km/h)

Pole position
Driver	Kevin Harvick	Stewart–Haas Racing
- Time: 35.198

Most laps led
Driver	Kevin Harvick	Stewart–Haas Racing
- Laps: 63

Winner
No. 48	Jimmie Johnson	Hendrick Motorsports

Television in the United States
- Network: TNT & MRN
- Announcers: Adam Alexander, Wally Dallenbach Jr. and Kyle Petty (Television); Joe Moore, Barney Hall and Jeff Striegle (Booth); Dave Moody (1 & 2) and Mike Bagley (3 & 4) (Turns) (Radio)
- Nielsen ratings: 2.7/7; 4.254 Million viewers

The 2014 Quicken Loans 400 was a NASCAR Sprint Cup Series stock car race that was held on June 15, 2014, at Michigan International Speedway in Brooklyn, Michigan. Contested over 200 laps on the 2 miles (3.2 km) superspeedway, it was the 15th race of the 2014 NASCAR Sprint Cup Series. Jimmie Johnson won the race, his third win of the season and his first at Michigan. Kevin Harvick finished second, while Brad Keselowski, Paul Menard, and Kasey Kahne rounded out the Top 5. The top rookies in the race were Kyle Larson (8th), Justin Allgaier (16th), and Michael Annett (21st).

== Report ==
=== Entry list ===
The entry list for the Quicken Loans 400 was released on Tuesday, June 10, 2014 at 8:30 a.m. Eastern time. Forty-four drivers were entered for the race.

No.	Driver	Team	Manufacturer
1	Jamie McMurray	Chip Ganassi Racing	Chevrolet
2	Brad Keselowski (PC2)	Team Penske	Ford
3	Austin Dillon (R)	Richard Childress Racing	Chevrolet
4	Kevin Harvick	Stewart–Haas Racing	Chevrolet
5	Kasey Kahne	Hendrick Motorsports	Chevrolet
7	Michael Annett (R)	Tommy Baldwin Racing	Chevrolet
9	Marcos Ambrose	Richard Petty Motorsports	Ford
10	Danica Patrick	Stewart–Haas Racing	Chevrolet
11	Denny Hamlin	Joe Gibbs Racing	Toyota
12	Juan Pablo Montoya	Team Penske	Ford
13	Casey Mears	Germain Racing	Chevrolet
14	Tony Stewart (PC3)	Stewart–Haas Racing	Chevrolet
15	Clint Bowyer	Michael Waltrip Racing	Toyota
16	Greg Biffle	Roush Fenway Racing	Ford
17	Ricky Stenhouse Jr.	Roush Fenway Racing	Ford
18	Kyle Busch	Joe Gibbs Racing	Toyota
20	Matt Kenseth (PC5)	Joe Gibbs Racing	Toyota
21	Trevor Bayne	Wood Brothers Racing	Ford
22	Joey Logano	Team Penske	Ford
23	Alex Bowman (R)	BK Racing	Toyota
24	Jeff Gordon (PC6)	Hendrick Motorsports	Chevrolet
26	Cole Whitt (R)	BK Racing	Toyota
27	Paul Menard	Richard Childress Racing	Chevrolet
31	Ryan Newman	Richard Childress Racing	Chevrolet
32	Travis Kvapil	Go FAS Racing	Ford
33	David Stremme	Circle Sport	Chevrolet
34	David Ragan	Front Row Motorsports	Ford
36	Reed Sorenson	Tommy Baldwin Racing	Chevrolet
38	David Gilliland	Front Row Motorsports	Ford
40	Landon Cassill (i)	Circle Sport	Chevrolet
41	Kurt Busch (PC4)	Stewart–Haas Racing	Chevrolet
42	Kyle Larson (R)	Chip Ganassi Racing	Chevrolet
43	Aric Almirola	Richard Petty Motorsports	Ford
44	J. J. Yeley (i)	Xxxtreme Motorsports	Chevrolet
47	A. J. Allmendinger	JTG Daugherty Racing	Chevrolet
48	Jimmie Johnson (PC1)	Hendrick Motorsports	Chevrolet
51	Justin Allgaier (R)	HScott Motorsports	Chevrolet
55	Brian Vickers	Michael Waltrip Racing	Toyota
66	Brett Moffitt	Michael Waltrip Racing	Toyota
78	Martin Truex Jr.	Furniture Row Racing	Chevrolet
83	Ryan Truex (R)	BK Racing	Toyota
88	Dale Earnhardt Jr.	Hendrick Motorsports	Chevrolet
98	Josh Wise	Phil Parsons Racing	Chevrolet
99	Carl Edwards	Roush Fenway Racing	Ford
Official entry list

Key	Meaning
(R)	Rookie
(i)	Ineligible for points
(PC#)	Past champions provisional

== Practice ==
=== First practice ===
Kasey Kahne was the fastest in the first practice session with a time of 35.410 and a speed of 203.332 mph (327.231 km/h).

Pos	No.	Driver	Team	Manufacturer	Time	Speed
1	5	Kasey Kahne	Hendrick Motorsports	Chevrolet	35.410	203.332
2	88	Dale Earnhardt Jr.	Hendrick Motorsports	Chevrolet	35.478	202.943
3	41	Kurt Busch	Stewart–Haas Racing	Chevrolet	35.524	202.680
Official first practice results

== Qualifying ==
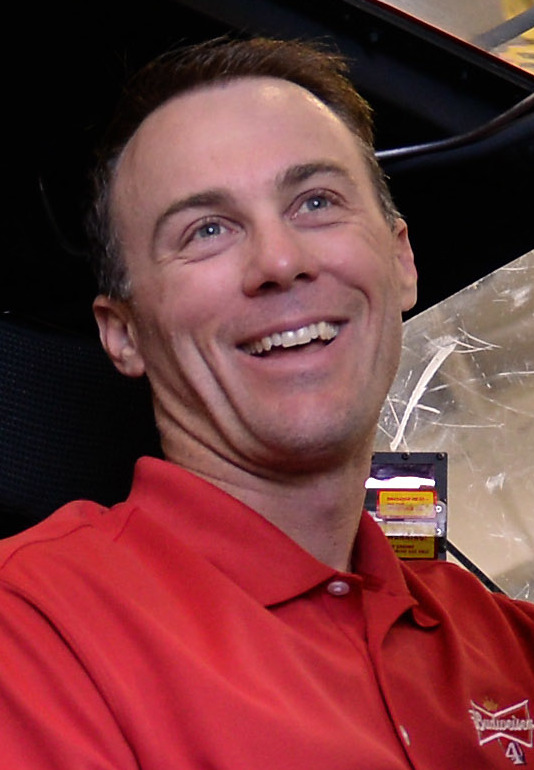
Kevin Harvick won the pole, setting a new track record.

Kevin Harvick won the pole with, both a new track record time and the fastest qualifying speed since 1987, a time of 35.198 and a speed of 204.557 mph (329.203 km/h). "I think that is just a credit on our Budweiser and Stewart-Haas race team for putting fast race cars on the track," Harvick said. "When you put it together with the Hendrick Motorsports engine package it creates a lot of speed and it makes coming to these place a lot of fun. Really excited to start on the pole and get that first pit box and hopefully we can put the whole day together on Sunday." Jeff Gordon, who qualified second, stated that he had "put up a heck of a lap ... just not enough to get Harvick". Ryan Truex was the only driver that failed to qualify.

=== Qualifying results ===
Pos	No.	Driver	Team	Manufacturer	R1	R2	R3
1	4	Kevin Harvick	Stewart–Haas Racing	Chevrolet	35.295	35.470	35.198
2	24	Jeff Gordon	Hendrick Motorsports	Chevrolet	35.541	35.707	35.333
3	88	Dale Earnhardt Jr.	Hendrick Motorsports	Chevrolet	35.638	35.723	35.341
4	43	Aric Almirola	Richard Petty Motorsports	Ford	35.702	35.830	35.433
5	27	Paul Menard	Richard Childress Racing	Chevrolet	35.640	35.686	35.461
6	2	Brad Keselowski	Team Penske	Ford	35.532	35.553	35.484
7	48	Jimmie Johnson	Hendrick Motorsports	Chevrolet	35.796	35.768	35.573
8	41	Kurt Busch	Stewart–Haas Racing	Chevrolet	35.845	35.770	35.636
9	22	Joey Logano	Team Penske	Ford	35.849	35.708	35.638
10	55	Brian Vickers	Michael Waltrip Racing	Toyota	35.772	35.680	35.762
11	1	Jamie McMurray	Chip Ganassi Racing	Chevrolet	35.577	35.656	35.912
12	42	Kyle Larson (R)	Chip Ganassi Racing	Chevrolet	35.572	35.800	0.000
13	5	Kasey Kahne	Hendrick Motorsports	Chevrolet	35.629	35.843	—
14	18	Kyle Busch	Joe Gibbs Racing	Toyota	35.717	35.849	—
15	15	Clint Bowyer	Michael Waltrip Racing	Toyota	35.806	35.851	—
16	78	Martin Truex Jr.	Furniture Row Racing	Chevrolet	35.796	35.853	—
17	51	Justin Allgaier (R)	HScott Motorsports	Chevrolet	35.834	35.869	—
18	16	Greg Biffle	Roush Fenway Racing	Ford	35.651	35.907	—
19	3	Austin Dillon (R)	Richard Childress Racing	Chevrolet	35.646	35.918	—
20	9	Marcos Ambrose	Richard Petty Motorsports	Ford	35.739	35.977	—
21	20	Matt Kenseth	Joe Gibbs Racing	Toyota	35.802	36.006	—
22	99	Carl Edwards	Roush Fenway Racing	Ford	35.830	36.084	—
23	21	Trevor Bayne	Wood Brothers Racing	Ford	35.737	36.087	—
24	31	Ryan Newman	Richard Childress Racing	Chevrolet	35.756	36.151	—
25	47	A. J. Allmendinger	JTG Daugherty Racing	Chevrolet	35.850	—	—
26	14	Tony Stewart	Stewart–Haas Racing	Chevrolet	35.918	—	—
27	10	Danica Patrick	Stewart–Haas Racing	Chevrolet	35.919	—	—
28	12	Juan Pablo Montoya	Team Penske	Ford	35.961	—	—
29	11	Denny Hamlin	Joe Gibbs Racing	Toyota	36.012	—	—
30	17	Ricky Stenhouse Jr.	Roush Fenway Racing	Ford	36.045	—	—
31	13	Casey Mears	Germain Racing	Chevrolet	36.069	—	—
32	38	David Gilliland	Front Row Motorsports	Ford	36.255	—	—
33	34	David Ragan	Front Row Motorsports	Ford	36.259	—	—
34	66	Brett Moffitt (R)	Identity Ventures Racing	Toyota	36.300	—	—
35	44	J. J. Yeley	Xxxtreme Motorsport	Chevrolet	36.382	—	—
36	33	David Stremme (Note: David Stremme started last due to an engine change.)	Circle Sport	Chevrolet	36.425	—	—
37	7	Michael Annett (R)	Tommy Baldwin Racing	Chevrolet	36.476	—	—
38	98	Josh Wise	Phil Parsons Racing	Chevrolet	36.554	—	—
39	40	Landon Cassill	Circle Sport	Chevrolet	36.629	—	—
40	36	Reed Sorenson	Tommy Baldwin Racing	Chevrolet	36.685	—	—
41	23	Alex Bowman (R)	BK Racing	Toyota	36.841	—	—
42	26	Cole Whitt (R)	BK Racing	Toyota	36.899	—	—
43	32	Travis Kvapil	Go FAS Racing	Ford	36.930	—	—
Did not qualify
44	83	Ryan Truex (R)	BK Racing	Toyota	36.561	—	—
Qualifying Results

== Practice (post-qualifying) ==
=== Second practice ===
Jimmie Johnson was the fastest in the second practice session with a time of 35.634 and a speed of 202.054 mph (325.174 km/h).

Pos	No.	Driver	Team	Manufacturer	Time	Speed
1	48	Jimmie Johnson	Hendrick Motorsports	Chevrolet	35.634	202.054
2	24	Jeff Gordon	Hendrick Motorsports	Chevrolet	35.692	201.726
3	4	Kevin Harvick	Stewart–Haas Racing	Chevrolet	35.722	201.556
Official second practice results

=== Final practice ===
Kyle Larson was the fastest in the final practice session with a time of 36.286 and a speed of 198.424 mph (319.332 km/h).

Pos	No.	Driver	Team	Manufacturer	Time	Speed
1	42	Kyle Larson (R)	Chip Ganassi Racing	Chevrolet	36.286	198.424
2	24	Jeff Gordon	Hendrick Motorsports	Chevrolet	36.315	198.265
3	4	Kevin Harvick	Stewart–Haas Racing	Chevrolet	36.320	198.238
Official final practice results

== Race ==
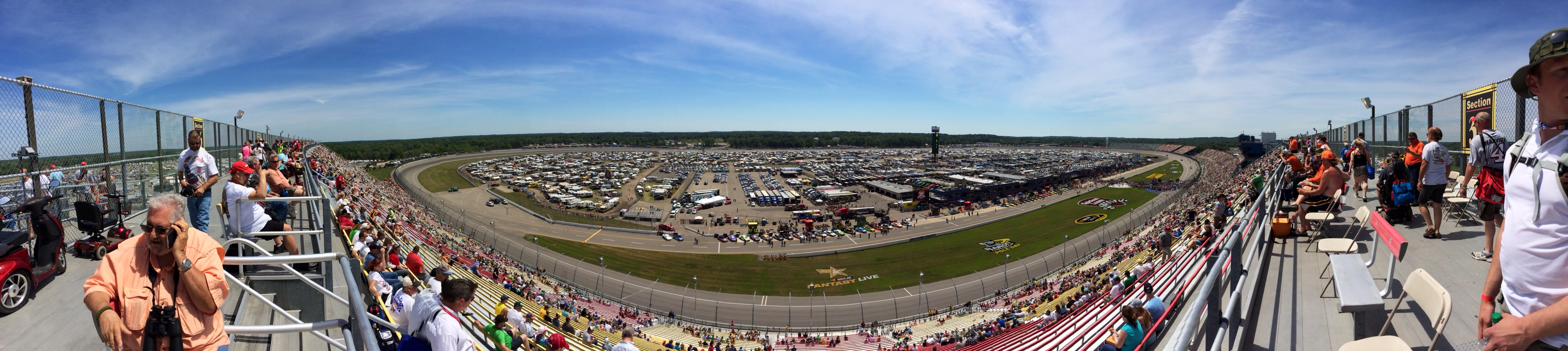
Michigan International Speedway, before the race.

=== First half ===
==== Start ====
The race was scheduled to start at 1:15 p.m. Eastern time but started five minutes later, with Kevin Harvick leading the field to the green flag. Brian Vickers got loose and hit the wall in turn three and was T-boned by Travis Kvapil to bring out the first caution of the race, on the opening lap. The race restarted on lap seven, before Kyle Larson got loose off turn two and went spinning to bring out the second caution. Kasey Kahne, Ricky Stenhouse Jr. and Martin Truex Jr. were also involved. The race restarted on lap 12 and finally completed a lap under green. Jeff Gordon took the race lead from Harvick on lap 19, before green flag stops began on lap 38. Brad Keselowski took the lead on lap 43, as he was the last car to pit, and the lead cycled back to Gordon.

Gordon got caught in lapped traffic and Harvick retook the lead on lap 57. Debris in turn three brought out the third caution on lap 72. Jimmie Johnson took the lead from Harvick during the pit cycle. Johnson led the field to the green on the restart and Kyle Busch, who restarted sixth, did not get going and had to come down pit road due to a burnt left-rear wheel hub. Joey Logano took the lead from Johnson on the restart, for the sixth lead change of the race on lap 78, before Johnson retook the lead from Logano on lap 92. David Ragan brought out the fourth caution of the race on lap 103 for a spin in turn four, and Harvick retook the lead during the pit cycle and led the field to the restart on lap 108. Alex Bowman brought out the fifth caution on lap 110, when he hit the wall in turn two.

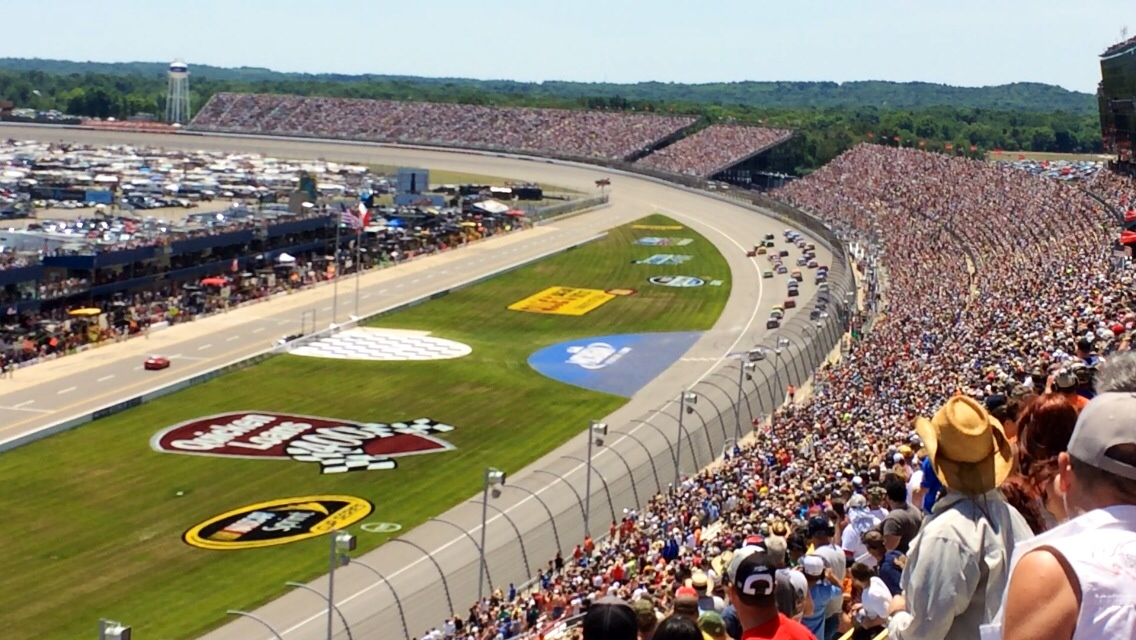
Racing action after a restart during the race.

=== Second half ===
Harvick led the field to the restart on lap 114 and Brett Moffitt brought out the sixth caution when he spun through turn four, with Harvick leading the field to the restart once again, on lap 120. Denny Hamlin got loose in turn three, making contact with Aric Almirola and spun to bring out the seventh caution of the race, on lap 122. Harvick stayed out when most of the other cars came in to pit, and led the field to the restart on lap 128. Joey Logano took the lead on the restart, but later in the run, Harvick retook the lead on lap 142. Debris in turn two brought out the eighth caution on lap 148. Jamie McMurray stayed out during the pit cycle to take the lead, while Larson was caught speeding off pit road.

==== Closing laps ====
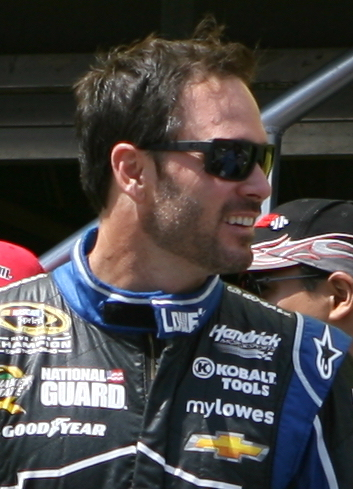
Jimmie Johnson won the race.

McMurray led the field to the restart on lap 153 but he spun the tires and gave the lead back to Johnson. Johnson gave up the lead to make his final stop on lap 165 and gave the lead back to Jamie McMurray, with the lead changing hands seven times – passing to Dale Earnhardt Jr., Kurt Busch, Kahne, Larson, Austin Dillon, Tony Stewart and Matt Kenseth – before Johnson retook the lead with ten laps to go and scored his third win of the 2014 season and first at Michigan. Johnson reflected upon this in a post-race interview, stating that he "had figured out every way to lose this race" and that he "knew we were in the catbird seat and were able to take advantage of it". Harvick described his car as "fast, just wound up on the wrong side of all the strategy".

=== Race results ===
Pos	No.	Driver	Team	Manufacturer	Laps	Points
1	48	Jimmie Johnson	Hendrick Motorsports	Chevrolet	200	47
2	4	Kevin Harvick	Stewart–Haas Racing	Chevrolet	200	44
3	2	Brad Keselowski	Team Penske	Ford	200	42
4	27	Paul Menard	Richard Childress Racing	Chevrolet	200	40
5	5	Kasey Kahne	Hendrick Motorsports	Chevrolet	200	40
6	24	Jeff Gordon	Hendrick Motorsports	Chevrolet	200	39
7	88	Dale Earnhardt Jr.	Hendrick Motorsports	Chevrolet	200	38
8	42	Kyle Larson (R)	Chip Ganassi Racing	Chevrolet	200	37
9	22	Joey Logano	Team Penske	Ford	200	36
10	15	Clint Bowyer	Michael Waltrip Racing	Toyota	200	34
11	14	Tony Stewart	Stewart–Haas Racing	Chevrolet	200	34
12	1	Jamie McMurray	Chip Ganassi Racing	Chevrolet	200	33
13	41	Kurt Busch	Stewart–Haas Racing	Chevrolet	200	32
14	20	Matt Kenseth	Joe Gibbs Racing	Toyota	200	31
15	31	Ryan Newman	Richard Childress Racing	Chevrolet	200	29
16	51	Justin Allgaier (R)	HScott Motorsports	Chevrolet	200	28
17	10	Danica Patrick	Stewart–Haas Racing	Chevrolet	200	27
18	12	Juan Pablo Montoya	Team Penske	Ford	200	26
19	21	Trevor Bayne	Wood Brothers Racing	Ford	200	0
20	16	Greg Biffle	Roush Fenway Racing	Ford	200	24
21	7	Michael Annett (R)	Tommy Baldwin Racing	Chevrolet	199	23
22	47	A. J. Allmendinger	JTG Daugherty Racing	Chevrolet	199	22
23	99	Carl Edwards	Roush Fenway Racing	Ford	199	21
24	13	Casey Mears	Germain Racing	Chevrolet	199	20
25	9	Marcos Ambrose	Richard Petty Motorsports	Ford	199	19
26	38	David Gilliland	Front Row Motorsports	Ford	198	18
27	17	Ricky Stenhouse Jr.	Roush Fenway Racing	Ford	198	17
28	26	Cole Whitt (R)	BK Racing	Toyota	198	16
29	11	Denny Hamlin	Joe Gibbs Racing	Toyota	198	15
30	3	Austin Dillon (R)	Richard Childress Racing	Chevrolet	197	15
31	43	Aric Almirola	Richard Petty Motorsports	Ford	197	13
32	36	Reed Sorenson	Tommy Baldwin Racing	Chevrolet	197	12
33	98	Josh Wise	Phil Parsons Racing	Chevrolet	197	11
34	66	Brett Moffitt (R)	Identity Ventures Racing	Toyota	197	10
35	40	Landon Cassill	Circle Sport	Chevrolet	197	0
36	44	J. J. Yeley	Xxxtreme Motorsports	Chevrolet	197	0
37	78	Martin Truex Jr.	Furniture Row Racing	Chevrolet	196	7
38	34	David Ragan	Front Row Motorsports	Ford	196	6
39	33	David Stremme	Circle Sport	Chevrolet	195	5
40	23	Alex Bowman (R)	BK Racing	Toyota	169	4
41	18	Kyle Busch	Joe Gibbs Racing	Toyota	169	3
42	55	Brian Vickers	Michael Waltrip Racing	Ford	110	2
43	32	Travis Kvapil	Go FAS Racing	Ford	23	1
Race Results

=== Race statistics ===
- Lead changes: 25 among different drivers
- Cautions/Laps: 8 for 36
- Red flags: 0
- Time of race: 2 hours, 47 minutes and 19 seconds
- Average speed: 143.441 miles per hour (230.846 km/h)

== Media ==
=== Television ===
TNT Sports
Booth announcers	Pit reporters
Lap-by-lap: Adam Alexander; Color-commentator: Wally Dallenbach Jr. Color commentator: Kyle Petty	Matt Yocum; Marty Snider; Chris Neville; Ralph Sheheen

=== Radio ===
MRN Radio
Booth announcers	Turn announcers	Pit reporters
Lead announcer: Joe Moore; Announcer: Barney Hall; Announcer: Jeff Striegle	Turns 1 & 2: Dave Moody; Turns 3 & 4: Mike Bagley	Winston Kelly; Steve Post; Alex Hayden; Woody Cain

== Standings after the race ==
Drivers' Championship standings

	Pos	Driver	Points
	1	Jeff Gordon	537
2	2	Jimmie Johnson	522 (−15)
	3	Dale Earnhardt Jr.	514 (−23)
2	4	Matt Kenseth	513 (−24)
	5	Brad Keselowski	490 (−47)
1	6	Carl Edwards	462 (−75)
2	7	Joey Logano	454 (−83)
2	8	Kyle Larson (R)	454 (−83)
3	9	Kevin Harvick	447 (−90)
4	10	Kyle Busch	446 (−91)
	11	Ryan Newman	440 (−97)
4	12	Denny Hamlin	435 (−102)
4	13	Paul Menard	420 (−117)
2	14	Clint Bowyer	417 (−120)
1	15	Greg Biffle	409 (−128)
2	16	Tony Stewart	402 (−135)

Manufacturers' Championship standings

Pos	Manufacturer	Points
1	Chevrolet	679
2	Ford	644 (−35)
3	Toyota	603 (−76)

- Note: Only the first sixteen positions are included for the driver standings.

== Note ==
Previous race: 2014 Pocono 400	Sprint Cup Series; 2014 season	Next race: 2014 Toyota/Save Mart 350
