= WJNC =

Radio station in Jacksonville, North Carolina, US

- Jacksonville, North Carolina; United States
- Frequency: 1240 kHz

Programming
- Format: Christian music, talk and teaching
- Network: Go Mix! Radio

Ownership
- Owner: Pathway Christian Academy, Inc.

History
- First air date: November 26, 1945
- Call sign meaning: Jacksonville, North Carolina

Technical information
- Licensing authority: FCC
- Facility ID: 73143
- Power: 1,000 watts
- Transmitter coordinates: 34°44′56.6″N 77°24′49.9″W
- Translator: W225CV (92.9 FM) Jacksonville

Links
- Public license information: Public file; LMS

WJNC (1240 AM) is a radio station in Jacksonville, North Carolina, United States. It is owned by Pathway Christian Academy of Goldsboro and broadcasts Pathway's Go Mix! Radio network, which airs Christian music and talk and teaching programs. WJNC transmits from a site near Lejeune Boulevard and U.S. 17.

WJNC was a locally programmed station from its debut in 1945 until 2002. In 2002, it converted back to talk and was paired with WTKF, which broadcasts to the Morehead City and New Bern areas. Pathway acquired WJNC and its accompanying FM translator in 2021.

== History ==
Louis N. and Ellis H. Howard, trading as the Jacksonville Broadcasting Company, applied to the Federal Communications Commission (FCC) on March 24, 1945, seeking permission to build a 250-watt radio station on 1240 kHz in Jacksonville. The commission granted the permit on July 17 of that year, and WJNC began broadcasting on November 26. It aired programs from the Mutual Broadcasting System and the regional Tobacco Network and was the last of several stations resulting from World War II in North Carolina; its coverage area included Camp Lejeune. WJNC was sold in 1949 to Lester Gould, the original general manager, and again in 1955 to Robert P. Mendelson, a veteran of radio advertising hailing from New York state. Under Mendelson, WJNC applied for and received a construction permit to build a new FM radio station. Originally WJNC-FM and then WRCM, the FM started with beautiful music before flipping to country. In October 1968, the station debuted a local morning talk show, Ask Your Neighbor. The program was born when its creator, announcer Mike Shadeed, asked people what they thought of the film 2001: A Space Odyssey, which he liked.

Mendelson sold WJNC and the FM station, then WRCM, to Beasley Broadcast Group in 1975, as part of his retirement. Under the new ownership, the station expanded its list of advertisers. With Beasley expanding into larger markets and unable to expand without selling stations, it sold the Jacksonville AM and FM to Winfas, a company that included people associated with radio stations in Raleigh and High Point. By that time, WJNC aired an adult contemporary format.

A Jacksonville-based firm of local business interests, WJNC Inc., acquired WJNC from Winfas in 1987, splitting it from WRCM, whose staff left for another facility. The station shifted its music format in 1989 from adult contemporary to oldies music of the 1950s, 1960s and 1970s, but the station by then predominantly aired news and talk programming. In 1992, an afternoon drive-time version of Ask Your Neighbor was added to the lineup.

Citing difficulties from increased consolidation in the broadcasting industry and a debt owed to the Associated Press, WJNC Inc. sold the station to Jacksonville-Topsail Radio, a company controlled by Hoyle Broome, in 1997. Broome, a former general manager of television station WBMG in Birmingham, Alabama, also owned WZXS on Topsail Island, which broadcast an adult standards format. Shortly after the sale was announced, in February 1998, Shadeed died after 29 years as host of Ask Your Neighbor. Additionally, WJNC became an all-sports station, airing the Carolina Panthers, North Carolina Tar Heels football, and national and local sporting events. Though the station was now primarily sports, it still aired Ask Your Neighbor and the syndicated The Rush Limbaugh Show. The all-sports format lasted until Eastern Communications acquired control in 2002. This made it sister to WSTK (910 AM), which became the sports station as WJNC reverted to a talk format with a local morning show and syndicated conservative talk programs.

Under Eastern, WJNC simulcasted WTKF, licensed to Atlantic. WTKF began broadcasting in 1992 as the state's first talk radio station on FM. This continued until Pathway Christian Academy, owner of the Go Mix! Radio network, acquired WJNC and FM translator W225CV in April 2021 for $150,000.
