= WTCG =

Mount Holly, North Carolina; United States
- Broadcast area: Charlotte metropolitan area
- Frequency: 870 kHz

Programming
- Format: Christian talk and teaching

Ownership
- Owner: Fiorini Broadcasting, LLC; (Bible Clarity)

History
- First air date: June 28, 1961 (as 1370 WGHC in Clayton, Georgia)
- Former call signs: WGHC (1961–2009)
- Former frequencies: 1370 kHz (1961–2009)
- Call sign meaning: "Worship the Creator God"

Technical information
- Licensing authority: FCC
- Facility ID: 68392
- Class: D
- Power: 5,000 watts (days only)
- Transmitter coordinates: 35°16′25.5″N 80°51′39.3″W
- Translator: 92.3 W222CW (Charlotte))

Links
- Public license information: Public file; LMS
- Website: wtcgradio.com

WTCG (870 kHz) is an AM radio station licensed to Mount Holly, North Carolina, and serving the Charlotte metropolitan area. It is owned by Fiorini Broadcasting, LLC. It is managed by Bible Clarity, based in Birmingham, Alabama. WTCG has a Christian talk and teaching radio format.

By day, WTCG transmits with 5,000 watts, using a non-directional antenna. Because 870 AM is a clear channel frequency reserved for WWL in New Orleans, WTCG must sign off at night. WTCG's transmitter is off North Hoskins Road in Charlotte, near Interstate 85. Programming is heard around the clock on 250 watt FM translator W222CW at 92.3 in Charlotte.

== History ==
The radio station now at 870 kHz was previously licensed in Clayton, Georgia, but changed its city of license to Mount Holly, North Carolina, in 2009. When the move occurred, the station moved from 250 watts of power on 1370 kHz to 5,000 watts of power on 870 kHz, the frequency formerly occupied by defunct radio station WGTL. The call sign changed from WGHC to WTCG.

WGHC was sold by Georgia-Carolina Radiocasting to Family First in a deal announced in 2008. Family First owner Linda de Romanett transferred the station's license from Family First to affiliate Bible Clarity on May 19, 2016.
