= Barney Hall =

Sports commentator

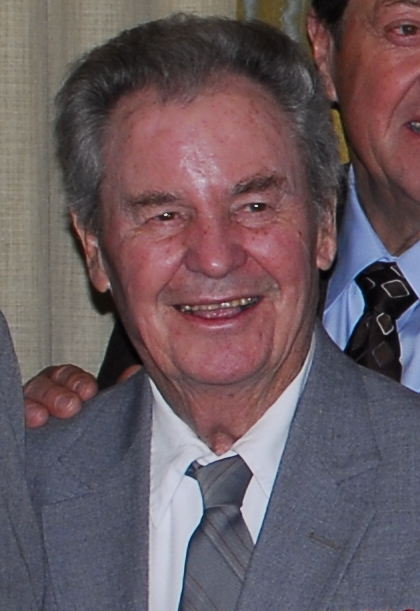
- Hall in 2011
- Born: Barney Hall; June 24, 1932; Elkin, North Carolina, U.S.
- Died: January 26, 2016 (aged 83)
- Occupation: Sports commentator
- Employer: Motor Racing Network
- Spouse: Karen Carrier (m. 1981)

Barney Hall (June 24, 1932 – January 26, 2016) was an American sports commentator for Motor Racing Network, formerly calling NASCAR races. Hall broadcast races for over 50 years. Hall is considered one of the best NASCAR commentators of all-time. MRN director David Hyatt stated, "Motor Racing Network is 'The Voice of NASCAR' and Barney Hall is the voice of MRN."

== Career ==
Hall was born at Elkin, North Carolina in 1932. After serving four years in the United States Navy, Hall's career started in the 1950s working for local radio stations in Elkin, particularly as disk jockey at WIFM-FM for 13 years.

In 1960, Hall became the first person to work on the public address system at Bristol Motor Speedway, which was stated as "dumb luck". When Motor Racing Network started in 1970, Hall became a turn announcer, before becoming a booth announcer. Hall commentated on all but three Daytona 500s in his career. On July 5, 2014, Hall announced that the Coke Zero 400 at Daytona would be his final broadcast.

In 2007, he was inducted into the National Motorsports Press Association (NMPA) Hall of Fame. On May 23, 2012, the NASCAR Hall of Fame announced the creation of the Squier-Hall Award for Media Excellence, named for Hall and former MRN reporter Ken Squier.

On January 26, 2016, MRN president David Hyatt announced that Hall had died at the age of 83 after complications from surgery. He was survived by his wife of 35 years, Karen Carrier.
