= WGTL =

- La Grange, North Carolina; United States
- Broadcast area: Greenville; New Bern; Morehead City
- Frequency: 104.7 MHz
- Branding: Go Mix! Early Light

Programming
- Format: Contemporary worship music
- Network: Go Mix! Radio

Ownership
- Owner: Pathways Christian Academy

History
- First air date: 1993
- Former call signs: WBSY (1993–2000); WZUP (2000–2025); WLGT (2025–2026)

Technical information
- Licensing authority: FCC
- Facility ID: 17618
- Class: C2
- ERP: 29,000 watts
- HAAT: 76 meters (249 ft)
- Transmitter coordinates: 35°6′23″N 77°42′20″W

Links
- Public license information: Public file; LMS
- Webcast: Listen live
- Website: gomixradio.org

WGTL (104.7 FM) is a radio station licensed to La Grange, North Carolina, United States. It serves the Greenville-New Bern-Morehead City area. The station is owned by Pathways Christian Academy.

== History ==
WGTL went on the air in 1993 as WBSY, licensed to Rose Hill, North Carolina. WBSY was a simulcast of WEGG, and branded as "The Wonderful Egg" with a format consisting of country music and southern gospel music. Thru The Bible Radio with Dr. J. Vernon McGee was part of the programming. Many local churches aired their ministries on the station as well. The station carried programming from ABC News Radio, the North Carolina News Network, and Southern Farm Network. James Kenan High School football and Wake Forest sports were part of the programming as well.

In 1995, Jeff Barnes Wilson died, and Duplin County Broadcasters sold WBSY and sister station WEGG to Conner Media Corporation on June 7, 1996. The station, shortly afterward, became "Country Bear 104.7 & 710". The full-time country format proved to be unsuccessful, and the format was changed to full-time traditional black gospel.

In 1999, WBSY broke away from the simulcast, and became a part of the Go Mix! Radio network. In 2000, the call letters were changed to WZUP.

In 2003, the station was relocated to a tower in Kinston, North Carolina, and a new Regional Mexican format was launched. The call sign was changed to WLGT in 2025, and the WZUP call sign was moved to 97.5 MHz in Washington, North Carolina.

The station was sold to Pathways Christian Academy, owner of the Go Mix! Radio network of Christian stations, in March 2026. In June 2026, the call letters changed to WGTL.

== Martin ==
On the TV sitcom Martin (1992–1997), a fictional Michigan radio station with the same name was Martin Payne's job and mentioned recurringly from the start of Martin until the season 2 finale episode, "Martin's on the Move", when the station gets sold to a country station called WEHA (coincidentally two years before the real WZUP changed to Country Bear.) Martin attempts to adapt to the new change to keep his job before quitting.
