= WVBS =

Burgaw, North Carolina; United States
- Frequency: 1470 kHz

Programming
- Format: Defunct (was Religious)
- Affiliations: Fundamental Broadcasting Network

Ownership
- Owner: Grace Christian School

History
- First air date: 1963
- Last air date: October 12, 2015
- Former call signs: WPGF (1963–1973)

Technical information
- Facility ID: 24711
- Class: D
- Power: 880 watts day 93 watts night
- Transmitter coordinates: 34°32′5.00″N 77°54′31.00″W

Links
- Website: www.fbnradio.com

WVBS (1470 AM) was a radio station licensed to Burgaw, North Carolina, United States. It last broadcast a Christian format, as an affiliate of the Fundamental Broadcasting Network, and was last owned by Grace Christian School. The station was first licensed December 3, 1963, and held the call sign WPGF. WPGF spawned a sister station, WPGF-FM, in 1964. In 1973, the station's call sign was changed to WVBS. The station's license was cancelled January 13, 2017, after having been silent since October 12, 2015.
