= WHQR =

- Wilmington, North Carolina; United States
- Frequency: 91.3 MHz (HD Radio)
- Branding: WHQR 91.3 & 92.7 FM

Programming
- Format: Public radio
- Subchannels: HD2: Classical music "Classical HQR"
- Affiliations: National Public Radio

Ownership
- Owner: Friends of Public Radio, Inc.

History
- First air date: April 24, 1984; 41 years ago
- Call sign meaning: Wilmington High Quality Radio

Technical information
- Licensing authority: FCC
- Facility ID: 22656
- Class: C
- ERP: 100,000 watts
- HAAT: 348 meters (1,142 ft)
- Transmitter coordinates: 34°7′53.60″N 78°11′16.00″W
- Translator: See § Translators

Links
- Public license information: Public file; LMS
- Website: www.whqr.org

WHQR is the National Public Radio (NPR) member station for Southeastern North Carolina, broadcasting on the FM band 91.3 MHz. Based inside the third floor of the historic Warwick Building on North Front Street in Wilmington and operated by Friends of Public Radio, Inc. (a community group). It airs NPR, American Public Media, Public Radio Exchange, and BBC programming as well as classical, jazz and adult album alternative music. WHQR hosts concerts, art receptions and events in their gallery space as well as live concerts from the Soup to Nuts Live program and monthly Classical concerts.

The station operates an FM translator station, W265EJ from Rose Hill on 100.9. WHQR also operates a sister classical music station called Classical HQR, broadcasting on the HD-2 stream as well as on translator W224CX from Wilmington on 92.7.

== HD programming ==
WHQR broadcasts in the HD radio format. Since April 2009, WHQR has broadcast Classical HQR on their HD2 sidechannel. Classical HQR specializes in classical music programming with local and national hosts.

== Translators ==
The network consists of one class C radio station, 91.3 and 4 FM translators. All stations are referred to as either WHQR or Classical HQR. The call letters of the other stations are identified only during required station IDs at the start of each hour.

WHQR's 100,000-watt signal not only covers Wilmington but much of southeastern North Carolina including Jacksonville, Surf City, Oak Island, Whiteville, Elizabethtown, Wallace, Warsaw and Lumberton. The station once operated an FM repeater station, W255BZ from Myrtle Beach on 98.9. The translator expanded that signal to cover northeastern South Carolina, including Myrtle Beach, Conway, Dillion, and Marion Counties.

WHQR still owns the 96.7 translator in Brunswick County, which was used for the Classical HQR format from September 2014 to March 2016. The signal changed to 92.7 MHz, which increased the power from 98 to 250 watts. The 96.7 translator was moved to Southport, NC to broadcast Classical HQR to that community.

WHQR's sister classical music station called Classical HQR, broadcasts on the HD-2 stream as well as on translator W224CX from Wilmington on 92.7. It was also on W272CV from Myrtle Beach on 102.3, starting April 23, 2016, the birthday of Shakespeare and the day after the station's 32nd anniversary. As of June 6, 2022, that translator was being used by WNMB.

Broadcast translator for WHQR
Call sign	Frequency	City of license	FID	ERP (W)	HAAT	Class	Transmitter coordinates	FCC info
W265EJ	100.9 FM	Rose Hill, North Carolina	157754	250	120 m (394 ft)	D	34°38′8.2″N 77°55′43.2″W	LMS

Broadcast translators for WHQR-HD2
Call sign	Frequency	City of license	FID	ERP (W)	HAAT	Class	Transmitter coordinates	FCC info
W224CX	92.7 FM	Wilmington, North Carolina	157854	250	0 m (0 ft)	D	34°17′8″N 77°58′32″W	LMS
W244DH	96.7 FM	Southport, North Carolina	157724	250	0 m (0 ft)	D	33°57′14″N 78°1′40″W	LMS

== Programming ==
In addition to syndicated national programming, WHQR has local programs that are both talk and music shows. WHQR hosts local news on the 91.3 station and produces Coastline with Rachel Lewis Hiburn and the Newsroom with Ben Schachtman. There is also a short interview segment, Around Town with Rhonda Bellamy, about local cultural movers and shakers. WHQR also features several folk, jazz and adult album alternative local programming. WHQR also produces four podcasts including Cape Fear Rundown, Coastline, Port City Politics, and The Newsroom. The MC Erny Art Gallery space at the WHQR studios in the historic Warwick building in downtown Wilmington also hosts community events. There are six art shows per year and the gallery participates in Wilmington's Fourth Friday late night gallery event. There are eight Soup to Nuts Live concerts per year, which are then aired on the radio on the Saturday program. A Little Lunch Music is an informal concert hosted in the gallery on the first Friday of every month at noon.

== History ==
WHQR began with a dark day for classical music lovers in Wilmington. On a Saturday in March 1979, avid listeners were disappointed when a local commercial radio station dropped its broadcast of the Metropolitan Opera without warning. Several listeners gathered together to figure out a way to bring opera broadcasts back, and held their first meeting on April 19 in the Kenan Hall Band Room on the UNC-Wilmington campus. They organized into a group called Friends of the Opera. They looked into the possibility of improving and collaborating with UNCW's college radio station, WLOZ, but there were many financial and administrative hurdles that made that a difficult possibility. Friends of the Opera slowly realized that a public radio station was the best way to return classical music to Wilmington and changed their name to Friends of Public Radio in early 1980. With some financial and fundraising help from Friends of Public Radio, WLOZ hosted the Metropolitan Opera broadcasts during the school year from December 12, 1979, until it was forced off the air in February 1981 due to a possible drug scandal.

In early 1982, Friends of Public Radio applied to the FCC to secure the license for 91.3 MHz, WLOZ's old frequency. They were turned down, but told to apply the following year. Friends of Public Radio continued to fundraise with concerts and newsletters and received local city and county grants. They were able to hire a technical director and a station manager. In July 1983, just as the station was about to start construction of their tower, local NBC affiliate WECT filed a complaint with the FCC, citing concerns about interference. To go on the air on their projected date of April 1984, the station was forced to drop the signal strength from a planned 30,000 watts to 1,500 watts, but reached an agreement with the FCC to slowly increase the power as long as there was no interference. The station hired 3 more staff members as required by the Corporation for Public Broadcasting. Membership for the radio station passed 1,000 in March 1984, and they choose the WHQR call sign.

Southeastern North Carolina's first public radio station went on-air at 7a.m. on Sunday, April 22, 1984. The first sound on the new radio station was of a baby crying, then Toccata and Fugue in D minor by Bach, followed by then station manager Michael Titterton announcing;

Good morning and welcome to the very first broadcast day of WHQR-FM, Wilmington North Carolina. WHQR FM transmits on a frequency of 91.3 MHz at an Effective radiated power of 1500 watts from 1270 feet above sea level. WHQR FM is licensed to and operated by the Friends of Public Radio, Inc with studios and offices at 1026 Greenfield Street. Transmitter and antenna are located at Winnabow, North Carolina.

The offices at Greenfield Street were in a converted bar in a strip mall. The first classical programming was a needle-drop style hosted by Michael Titterton, Prelude and Concert in the Morning, and the station provided local news at the top of the hour in the mornings. NPR talk shows played in the afternoons and in the evenings local volunteer DJs hosted the show Jazz till Midnight. In keeping with the founding of the station, Metropolitan and other Opera companies played on Saturday afternoons. The station was on air for 18 hours a day for the first several years. After less than 5 months of being on the air, on September 13, 1984 Hurricane Diana hit the Carolina coast. Most communication in the area was down, but WHQR was only off air for 90 minutes and was, for a while, the only FM station on-air. By May 1985, the station was able to increase its power to its originally planned strength of 30,000 watts. Also in May 1985, Sharon Mahoney won two Associated Press awards for journalism - one of them was for her reporting during Diana. Over the first five years, the station slowly increased and hit all of their semi-annual pledge-drive goals save for one where there was a problem with signal strength. The Radio Research Corporation's (RRC) effectiveness rating in July 1985 showed that WHQR was 31st of 312 public radio stations nationally, a remarkable feat for a station in such a small market. In 1988 "Titterton announced in the program guide that the station had been in the top 20 of RRC-rated stations for the past 3 years."

In 1992, the popular weekly program Flamenco Cafe with William "Paco" Strickland started. Station manager Titterton heard him at a bar and recruited him to play Flamenco guitar on air. Flamenco café was syndicated to public radio stations nationwide. In April 1994 the WHQR studios moved to a new downtown location on the third floor of the historic Warwick building at 254 N. Front Street, Wilmington.

WHQR suffered serious financial problems during the recession, and "ran a deficit of nearly $400,000 in 2007-2008." In January 2007, the station cancelled several local jazz and folk programs. This included Flamenco Cafe, which moved to The Penguin, a local commercial station. Programming manager Bob Workman and station manager John Milligan stated that they were trying to appeal to a younger audience and create smoother "talk blocks". The next year, listeners complained in an editorial in the Star-News that there was too much talk on the station and not enough classical music. In December 2008, Friends of Public Radio decided to remove the position of station manager as a cost-cutting measure. WHQR purchased an HD transmitter in April 2009 after a successful pledge drive, which fixed the older, unreliable transmitter. The station's financial problems improved slowly, from 2008 to 2009 WHQR ran a $170,000 deficit and almost broke even in 2010. In September 2010 WHQR hired Cleve Callison as station manager, who pushed for most of the financial changes at the station.

On June 1, 2009, WHQR added the HD2 station, Classical HQR, which simulcast the morning local classical music and added NPR's classical stream for the rest of the day. Listenership was low as people had to buy new HD radio receivers to tune in. The station also had an extra pledge drive in the summer of 2009 to help pay off their debts. Local actress Mary Carole Erny died in 2010. She spent 15 years volunteering for WHQR. In her will she bequeathed the station $50,000, which WHQR learned about in 2011. The station spent some of the money for an assessment team to see if WHQR would get a positive response from a capital campaign. The station renamed the art gallery space in the Warwick building to be the MC Erny Gallery in her honor. In early 2013 the emPowering Our Future campaign started with a plan to raise $1.5 million to expand service, improve technology and create a welcoming space.

In 2014 WHQR divided into two stations. Friends of Public Radio purchased a transmitter on the analog FM frequency of 96.7 MHz to simulcast the Classical HQR stream, allowing listeners without HD radio a chance to listen. The morning classical music block was removed from 91.3, which became a news, talk and jazz station. In August 2014, with money raised from the capital campaign, Friends of Public Radio bought the studios in the Warwick building outright.

Classic HQR moved to the FM frequency 92.7 MHz in March 2016 with a higher broadcast power of 250 watts. The campaign slogan "92 is the new 96" played for a month during the transition. On April 23, 2016, the birthday of Shakespeare and the day after the station's 32nd anniversary, WHQR added W272CV 102.3 FM in Myrtle Beach for the classical format. In December 2016 the emPowering Our Future Capital Campaign reached its $1.5 million goal after a public drive. Most of the campaign operated in a quiet phase, receiving $1.15 million in grants and support from underwriting businesses. The money from the capital campaign is going towards one-time improvements to the station. In January 2017 the goal was exceeded with a final amount of $1.9 million raised. Kevin Crane is the Station Manager as of July 2022.
