= WRDK =

Bladenboro, North Carolina; United States
- Frequency: 90.7 MHz

Programming
- Format: Defunct

Ownership
- Owner: Richburg Educational Broadcasters, Inc

History
- First air date: 2011
- Last air date: March 12, 2018 (date of license surrender)

Technical information
- Licensing authority: FCC
- Facility ID: 174151
- Class: A
- ERP: 780 watts
- HAAT: 93.8 meters
- Transmitter coordinates: 34°33′19.00″N 78°48′57.00″W

Links
- Public license information: Public file; LMS

WRDK (90.7 FM) was a radio station licensed to serve Bladenboro, North Carolina, United States. The station was owned by Richburg Educational Broadcasters, Inc. The station surrendered its license on March 12, 2018; the Federal Communications Commission cancelled it on March 22.
