= WVCB =

- Shallotte, North Carolina; United States
- Broadcast area: Grand Strand
- Frequency: 1410 kHz

Programming
- Format: Contemporary Christian and gospel music
- Affiliations: Salem Radio Network; Carolina Panthers Radio Network; Sports USA Radio Network; Music & the Spoken Word

Ownership
- Owner: WVCB Radio

History
- First air date: June 11, 1964
- Last air date: September 15, 2021

Technical information
- Licensing authority: FCC
- Facility ID: 31573
- Class: D
- Power: 500 watts day; 168 watts night
- Transmitter coordinates: 33°58′37″N 78°22′54″W

Links
- Public license information: Public file; LMS

WVCB (1410 AM) was a radio station broadcasting a combination of contemporary Christian and gospel music. WVCB transmitted with a daytime power of 500 watts, reducing to 168 watts during nighttime. It had always held the call sign WVCB. WVCB was an affiliate of the Carolina Panthers Radio Network, and aired other NFL games via the Sports USA Radio Network. It also aired Music & the Spoken Word from CBS Radio. WVCB went silent on September 15, 2021.

== History ==
=== Shallotte Broadcasting Company ===
The Shallotte Broadcasting Company applied for a new broadcasting license on April 30, 1962, which was granted on September 11, 1963. On October 3, 1963, the call sign WVCB was attached to the construction permit. WVCB began broadcasting on June 11, 1964. Its license was granted on January 12, 1965.

=== The John Worrell years ===
In January 1984, John Worrell bought the station. Upon his death, ownership transferred to his wife, Joyce.

On December 24, 2014, the station went off the air; it returned to the air on December 6, 2015.

=== Post-John Worrell ===
WVCB changed its format in April 2017 to a more contemporary and gospel music format, adding national and local ministries as broadcast partners. WVCB also began streaming its broadcast on TuneIn and the website.

WVCB went silent on September 15, 2021 due to its transmitter failing. The Federal Communications Commission cancelled the station’s license on January 31, 2024.
