= WQNX =

- Aberdeen, North Carolina; United States
- Frequency: 1350 kHz

Programming
- Format: News/talk
- Affiliations: CBS Radio Network

Ownership
- Owner: Golf Capital Broadcasting

History
- First air date: January 1982
- Last air date: December 2011
- Former call signs: WANC (1981–1987); WEET (1987); WSCT (1987–1988)

Technical information
- Facility ID: 24558
- Class: D
- Power: 2,500 watts
- Transmitter coordinates: 35°7′20″N 79°24′57″W

WQNX (1350 AM) was a radio station broadcasting a news/talk format. Licensed to Aberdeen, North Carolina, United States. The station was owned by Golf Capital Broadcasting.

WQNX was deleted by the Federal Communications Commission (FCC) on December 2, 2011, for failure to file for the renewal of its license (which expired a day earlier).
