= WSTK =

- Aurora, North Carolina; United States
- Broadcast area: New Bern, Morehead City, Washington, & Havelock
- Frequency: 104.5 MHz

Programming
- Format: Christian music and Christian talk and teaching
- Network: Go Mix! Radio

Ownership
- Owner: Pathway Christian Academy, Inc.

History
- First air date: 2004
- Former call signs: WFPF (1998–2004, CP); WSTK (2004–2008); WAVQ (2008–2009)

Technical information
- Licensing authority: FCC
- Facility ID: 85793
- Class: A
- ERP: 4,200 watts
- HAAT: 119.7 meters (393 ft)
- Transmitter coordinates: 35°18′9″N 76°34′0″W

Links
- Public license information: Public file; LMS
- Website: gomixradio.org

WSTK (104.5 FM) is an American radio station licensed to serve the community of Aurora, North Carolina. The station is owned by Media East, LLC. WSTK offers a Christian music and Christian talk and teaching format using the Go Mix! Radio network.

== History ==
In October 2007, WSTK began simulcasting WLGT 98.3 FM, airing a Contemporary Christian format, branded as “The Light”. It was also simulcast on WEGG (710 AM) for the first month.

In March 2008, The Light brand was dropped from WSTK and WLGT. WSTK, WLGT, and WEGG were rebranded “Glory Radio”, all three stations operating separately. WSTK offered a Southern Gospel format.

In June 2008, WLGT became "The Promise 98.3". WEGG and WSTK were rebranded “Joy 710 & 104.5” with a traditional black gospel music format, operating the same syndicated format as 1490 WWIL (AM), under LMA by the same person who operates 1490.

In October 2008, WSTK went silent due to financial difficulties, and one month later changed its call sign to WAVQ. The station came back on the air for less than one month under the name “The Wave” with a Carolina Beach Music format, simulcasting with WAVQ 1400 AM in Jacksonville, North Carolina. The venture was cut short when the principal investor backed out. The station went silent once again.

On February 6, 2009, the call sign was reverted to WSTK.

In May 2009, WSTK resumed broadcasting, simulcasting WEGG. WEGG added new FM translator W240BN 95.9 FM. W240BN was located on the 710 AM tower, and broadcast with 250 watts of power. The station was rebranded as “The Gospel Superstation”.

On June 1, 2009, WSTK went silent once again.

On July 1, 2010, WSTK began simulcasting WEGG (710 AM) “The Gospel Superstation”, once again.

On September 1, 2010, WSTK broke away from the simulcast with WEGG and was rebranded as “Hometown Gospel Station” before going silent yet again on October 4, 2010.

On January 4, 2011, WSTK returned to the air as “Your Christian Radio”, broadcasting a traditional black gospel format. The station began a simulcast with WLGT on November 14, 2011.

In April 2012, WSTK and WLGT flipped to a Christian Talk format, under the same branding as “Your Christian Radio”.

WSTK fell silent again on January 18, 2012 due to transmitter problems.

WSTK resumed broadcasting in January 2013, simulcasting WLGT.

On May 4, 2013, WLGT (98.3 FM) became "The Bridge" with a Contemporary Christian Music format, while WSTK continued under the Your Christian Radio branding.

In June 2013, WSTK's transmitter power supply failed, which caused the station to be silent until the new power supply would arrive, the manufacturer stated it would take "more than 30 days" to send out a new power supply.

In June 2013, WSTK resumed operations under new branding as “The Vine Connection” with an Urban contemporary gospel format, under LMA. The Vine Connection was previously on WTOW 1320 AM in Washington, North Carolina from 2005 to 2008, and 2011 to 2013. The Vine Connection was unable to generate sufficient revenue to continue operating the radio station, and was, unfortunately, dropped from the station on February 29, 2016. The Vine Connection does, however, continue to operate as an internet radio station.

On March 1, 2016, Surge Media, LLC entered into an LMA with Media East, LLC to operate WSTK. Surge Media, LLC also operates WEGG 710 AM via LMA, and owns FM translator W263BE 100.5 FM. WSTK once again began simulcasting WEGG, as “Surge Radio” with a Rhythmic Adult Contemporary/Dance Hits format, and on Sunday offers urban gospel.

On August 10, 2016, Surge Media, LLC announced that it would be ending its LMA with Media East, LLC and would cease broadcasting on WSTK as of August 31, 2016 at 11:59pm. Surge Media, LLC was unable to generate any revenue from the station, and determined that it was not a viable option to continue operating the signal. Ken Santarelli of Surge Media, LLC cited extreme tropospheric interference problems as being the major component of why WSTK was not viable, in which tropospheric ducting would cause other radio stations, even from several states away, to cause interference in the Morehead City, New Bern, and Washington areas; making WSTK unlistenable for as much as six hours out of the day. Interference from the recently upgraded WYHW also caused additional interference issues, specifically in the Morehead City area.

The simulcast with WEGG ended at 11:59 p.m. on August 31, 2016. Afterward, WSTK went silent. Surge Radio continued to broadcast on WEGG until January 10, 2017. Surge continues to stream online.

On Thursday, October 6, 2016, WSTK became “Oldies 104.5”, playing a fully automated oldies format, ranging from the 1930s to the 1990s. The oldies format also failed to generate any revenue. The oldies format ended abruptly when the studio-to-transmitter link was hacked, and the station began playing a loop of FDT by YG and Nipsey Hussle. It took several days before station management noticed the problem, WSTK was then taken off the air on January 31, 2017.

On Wednesday, March 1, 2017, WSTK once again became The Vine Connection with an Urban Contemporary Gospel format, under LMA.

On Friday, September 1, 2017, WSTK began simulcasting, once again, on WEGG, continuing as The Vine Connection.

On Monday, July 1, 2019, WSTK ceased simulcasting on WEGG. WSTK is continuing as The Vine Connection but WEGG became Country music WKOO-100.5 Kix FM.

On Wednesday, June 1, 2022, WSTK flipped formats to a simulcast of WLGT as “98.3 & 104.5 The Bridge”.

On May 1, 2024, WLGT and WSTK changed their format from contemporary Christian to worship music, branded as "Sozo Radio".

On December 30, 2024, WLGT and WSTK ended Christmas stunting and launched a classic country format, branded as "Classic Country 97.5 & 104.5".

As of November 2025, WSTK is airing a Christian music and talk and teaching format using the Go Mix! Radio network after being sold to Pathway Christian Academy, Inc.
