= WVOT =

Radio station in Wilson, North Carolina (1948–2017)

- Wilson, North Carolina; United States
- Frequency: 1420 kHz

Programming
- Format: Urban contemporary gospel

Ownership
- Owner: Kingdom Expansion Corporation

History
- First air date: June 1948
- Last air date: 2011
- Former call signs: WVOT (1948–1999); WALQ (1999–2001)
- Call sign meaning: "Wilson's Voice of Tobacco" or "Wilson's Voice of Truth"

Technical information
- Facility ID: 8778
- Class: B
- Power: 1,000 watts (day); 500 watts (night)
- Transmitter coordinates: 35°44′13.7″N 77°53′7.0″W

WVOT (1420 AM) was a radio station licensed to and located in Wilson, North Carolina, United States. The FCC assigned frequency was 1420 kHz. The station operated at 1,000 watts non-directional by day, and 500 watts directional at night, largely on a north-facing axis.

== History ==
WVOT signed on in June 1948. The station's call letters originally stood for "Voice of Tobaccoland".

In 1984, Century Communications sold WVOT and FM sister station WXYY to Voyager Communications. The FM was moved to Raleigh and the call letters were changed to WRDU. A new tower site for WRDU was built near Middlesex, North Carolina. The AM facility remained in Wilson.

Career Communications bought WVOT in 1990. In 1997, Career Communications sold the station to Al Taylor's Taylor Group Broadcasting. During this time, the call letters were changed to WALQ.

WVOT's final format was urban contemporary gospel. Past formats have included talk, Carolina beach music, oldies, adult contemporary, contemporary hit radio, and block programming.

On November 9, 2017, the Federal Communications Commission (FCC) informed WVOT that it had received a complaint on September 9 that the station had not operated since 2011 (broadcast stations are required to return to the air within a year of going silent), and ordered it to provide information about its operations since the expiration of its most recent special temporary authority authorization on August 29, 2014. The station did not respond to the operational status inquiry, and its license was cancelled on December 19, 2017.
