= WDJS =

- Mount Olive, North Carolina; United States
- Frequency: 1430 kHz

Programming
- Format: diversified

Ownership
- Owner: Ann Weldon Mayo Trust; (Mount Olive Broadcasting Company, L.L.C.)

History
- Call sign meaning: Wayne, Duplin, Johnston and Sampson counties What Did Jesus Say?

Technical information
- Licensing authority: FCC
- Class: B
- Power: 10,000 Watts day 5,000 Watts night
- Transmitter coordinates: 35°12′1″N 78°7′23″W
- Translators: W273DV (102.5 MHz, Goldsboro)

Links
- Public license information: Public file; LMS
- Website: https://www.wdjsradio.net/

WDJS (1430 AM) is a radio station broadcasting a Religious format. Licensed to Mount Olive, North Carolina, United States, the station is currently owned by the Ann Weldon Mayo Trust, through licensee Mount Olive Broadcasting Company, L.L.C.
