= WIFM-FM =

- Elkin, North Carolina; United States
- Frequency: 100.9 MHz
- Branding: 100.9 WIFM

Programming
- Format: Adult contemporary

Ownership
- Owner: Yadkin Valley Broadcasting Corporation

History
- First air date: 1949

Technical information
- Licensing authority: FCC
- Facility ID: 20411
- Class: A
- ERP: 470 watts
- HAAT: 215.5 meters
- Transmitter coordinates: 36°11′50.00″N 80°50′13.00″W

Links
- Public license information: Public file; LMS
- Webcast: Listen Live
- Website: wifmradio.com

WIFM-FM (100.9 FM) is a radio station licensed to Elkin, North Carolina, United States. The station is currently owned by Yadkin Valley Broadcasting Corporation and broadcasts an adult contemporary format.

== History ==
Al Hinshaw signed on WIFM in 1949. Most FM stations were paired with an AM, but Hinshaw's brother owned a radio repair shop and they both believed FM was the future. WIFM was also different from other radio stations because it played pre-recorded music, while other stations aired Burns and Allen, Jack Benny and Amos 'n' Andy. Still, few people had FM radios, so the station had almost no listeners. An AM station – called WJOS because it was based in Jonesville – was added in 1953 and did not perform much better.

Jim Childress bought WIFM in 1954 and used block programming, with pop music, country music, and gospel music. A lot of music was performed live, and there was preaching on Sunday mornings.

The AM and FM stations aired the same programming (the AM went off the air at night) until FCC rules prohibited this more than a few hours a day. By this time, enough people had FM radios that separate programming became possible.

In the mid-60s, WIFM began airing local news, which became one of the station's greatest strengths. Alan Combs was the first person tasked with this duty. In 1972 Ralph Shaw was hired. Ralph became perhaps WIFM's best-known News Director, and won many awards for his outstanding news coverage, bringing the station statewide, and even national attention...especially during the tragic Siloam Bridge collapse in the mid 70s, when Ralph's reports were heard on ABC Radio.

In the mid-70s, Leon Reece's "Good Morning Show" and "Open Mike" aired on both stations. These became perhaps the best-known shows ever on WIFM, and continued until 1995, when Tri-County Broadcasting sold the station to FSA Broadcasting. In the 1970s the FM played pre-recorded country music on reel-to-reel tape during the morning and late afternoon, and gospel music in the early afternoon. Pop/rock music aired in the evening.

During the 1970s WIFM would do remote broadcasts, where a DJ actually brought 45s and played them from the location. The AM station (WJOS) played primarily gospel music.

In the early '90s, Mike Walker was named program director. In 1994 Alan Combs, WIFM's station manager, John Wishon, WJOS's station manager, and Ken Byrd, an announcer on WJOS left WIFM, taking over the reins at WWWC in Wilkesboro, which they purchased jointly.

In 1995, Tri-County Broadcasting sold WIFM to F.S.A. Broadcasting, and the offices moved to a new location on North Bridge Street, though the studios remained on Elk Spur Street for a while. Chris Newman was named general manager. Mike Walker was promoted to Operations Manager, and transitioned the format from oldies to adult contemporary. Mike assumed the morning show "officially" after the departure of Leon Reece, although he had actually hosted it for several months previously. Cathy Smith returned to the station as Sales Manager. Ray McCrary was named News Director.
