= Go Mix! Radio =

Christian radio network in North Carolina, United States

- Type: Radio network
- Country: United States
- Branding: Go Mix! Christian Radio

Ownership
- Owner: Pathway Christian Academy, Inc.

History
- Launch date: July 1, 1998

Coverage
- Availability: North Carolina

Links
- Webcast: Listen Live
- Website: http://www.gomixradio.org/

Go Mix! Radio is a network of Christian radio stations in North Carolina, broadcasting Christian music and Christian talk and teaching. Go Mix! Radio is currently heard on 10 full powered stations and one translator in North Carolina.

== History ==
Go Mix! Radio's flagship station, 88.7 FM WAGO in Snow Hill, North Carolina, began broadcasting on July 1, 1998.

In 2021, Pathway Christian Academy purchased AM 1240 WJNC in Jacksonville, North Carolina, along with its FM translator 92.9 FM W225CV, for $150,000, and they became affiliates of Go Mix! Radio.

In 2022, Pathway Christian Academy purchased a construction permit for a new station at 88.1 FM in Vanceboro, North Carolina from Down East Communications for $215,000. The station began broadcasting in August 2023, holding the call sign WGML and airing a classic praise & worship music format branded "Go Mix! Early Light".

== Stations ==
Go Mix! Radio stations
Call sign	Frequency	City of license	Facility ID	Class	ERP (W)	Power (W)	Height (m (ft))
WZGO	91.1 FM	Aurora, North Carolina	77845	C2	40,000	–	107 m (351 ft)
WSTK	104.5 FM	Aurora, North Carolina	85793	A	4,200	–	119.7 m (393 ft)
WGXM	91.1 FM	Calypso, North Carolina	173569	A	2,200	–	49.7 m (163 ft)
WCGI	89.1 FM	Clinton, North Carolina	762611	C3	13,000	–	58 m (190 ft)
WZRU	90.1 FM	Garysburg, North Carolina	2468	C2	11,000	–	154 m (505 ft)
WHGO	91.3 FM	Hertford, North Carolina	174389	A	3,100	–	106 m (348 ft)
WGTL	104.7 FM	La Grange, North Carolina	17618	C2	29,000	–	76 m (249 ft)
WGXO	90.9 FM	Magnolia, North Carolina	174875	C3	8,000	–	105 m (344 ft)
WZRN	90.5 FM	Norlina, North Carolina	122305	A	2,300	–	91 m (299 ft)
WAGO	88.7 FM	Snow Hill, North Carolina	51730	C3	17,000	–	89 m (292 ft)
WGML	88.1 FM	Vanceboro, North Carolina	765407	C3	7,000	–	149 m (489 ft)
WTGX	90.5 FM	Williamston, North Carolina	122715	C3	20,000	–	92 m (302 ft)
WJNC	1240 AM	Jacksonville, North Carolina	73143	C	–	1,000	
W225CV	92.9 FM	Jacksonville, North Carolina	200613	D	250	–	73 m (240 ft)
