= WKGV =

- Swansboro, North Carolina; United States
- Broadcast area: Wilmington, North Carolina
- Frequency: 104.1 MHz
- Branding: K-Love

Programming
- Format: Contemporary Christian
- Affiliations: K-LOVE

Ownership
- Owner: Educational Media Foundation

History
- First air date: November 15, 1990
- Former call signs: WZXS (11/15/1990-3/4/2003); WWTB (3/4/2003-11/29/2007)

Technical information
- Licensing authority: FCC
- Facility ID: 67339
- Class: A
- ERP: 5,400 watts
- HAAT: 105.3 meters
- Transmitter coordinates: 34°43′26″N 77°14′57″W

Links
- Public license information: Public file; LMS
- Webcast: Listen Live
- Website: klove.com

WKGV (104.1 FM) is a Contemporary Christian radio station licensed to Swansboro, North Carolina, United States. It is an affiliate of K-Love and is owned by Educational Media Foundation.

== History ==
Jack Lee, manager of WFAI in Fayetteville, North Carolina from 1960 to 1971, was general manager of WZXS when it played adult standards.

WWTB "Unforgettable Radio" signed off in January 2004 when new owner Sea-Comm announced the station would begin airing the same programming as WLTT "The Big Talker".

In 2007, Educational Media Foundation agreed to buy WWTB from Sea-Comm for $900,000. WWTB moved its frequency from 103.9 to 104.1, and its city of license from Topsail Beach to Swansboro. The former WBNE became WNTB, taking over the WLTT simulcast.
