= Rose Hill, North Carolina =

- Town
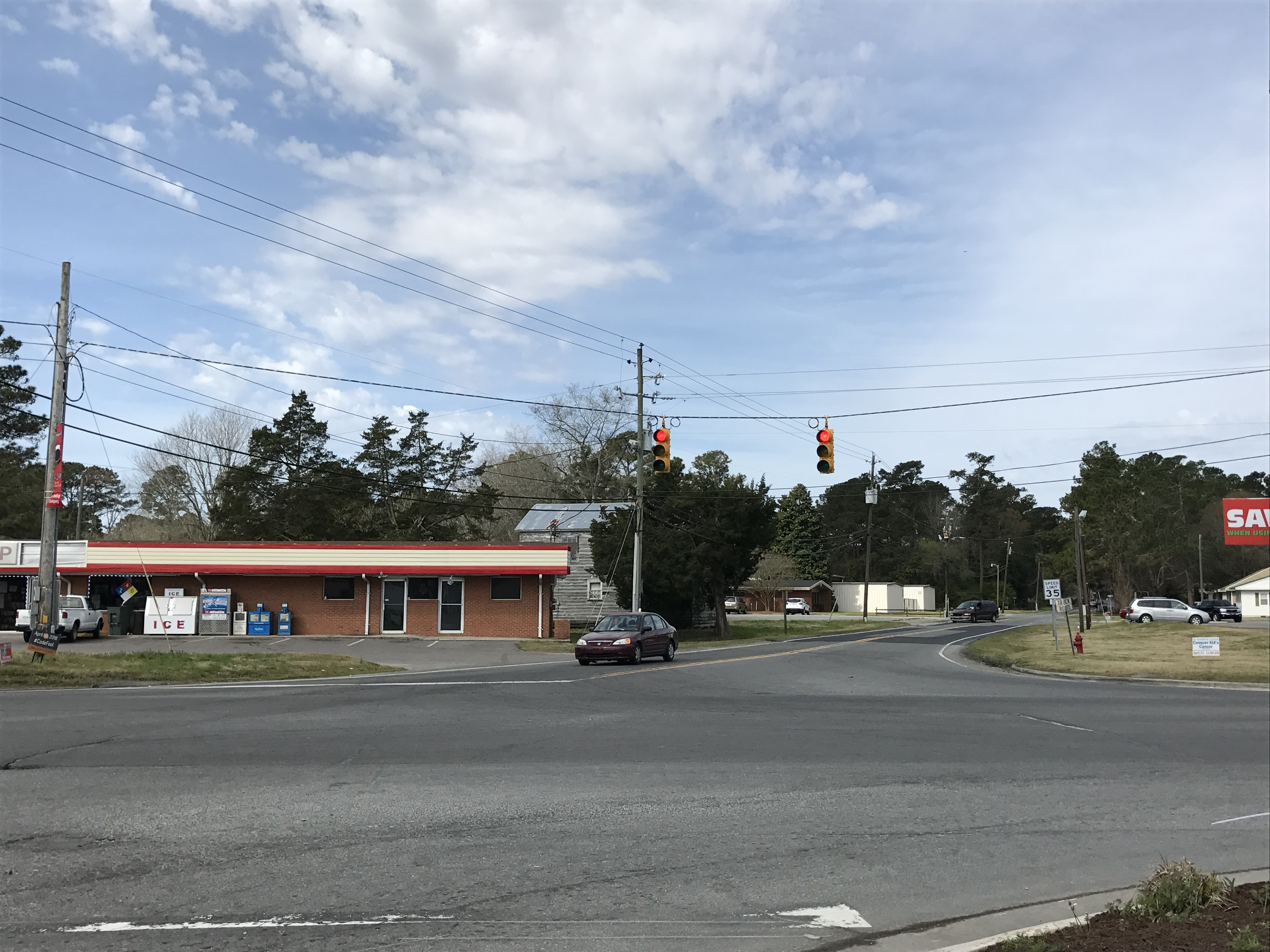

- Location within the state of North Carolina
- Coordinates: 34°49′34″N 78°01′33″W
- Country: United States
- State: North Carolina
- County: Duplin

Area
  - Total: 1.44 sq mi (3.74 km^{2})
  - Land: 1.44 sq mi (3.74 km^{2})
  - Water: 0 sq mi (0.00 km^{2})
- Elevation: 98 ft (30 m)

Population (2020)
  - Total: 1,371
  - Density: 948.9/sq mi (366.36/km^{2})
- Time zone: UTC-5 (Eastern (EST))
  - Summer (DST): UTC-4 (EDT)
- ZIP code: 28458
- Area codes: 910, 472
- FIPS code: 37-57860
- GNIS feature ID: 2407244
- Website: townofrosehillnc.com

Rose Hill is a town in Duplin County, North Carolina, United States. At the 2020 census, the population was 1,371. Rose Hill claims to be the home of the world's largest frying pan.

== History ==
A post office called Rose Hill was established in 1872. The town was named for the abundance of wild roses near the original town site.

== Geography ==
Rose Hill is located in southwestern Duplin County. U.S. Route 117 passes through the center of town, leading north 12 miles (19 km) to Warsaw and south 7 miles (11 km) to Wallace. Interstate 40 passes just east of the town, with access from exit 380. It leads south 49 miles (79 km) to Wilmington and north 84 miles (135 km) to Raleigh.

According to the United States Census Bureau, Rose Hill has a total area of 1.4 square miles (3.7 km^{2}), all land.

== Demographics ==
Historical population
Census	Pop.	Note	%±
1910	364		—
1920	516		41.8%
1930	554		7.4%
1940	727		31.2%
1950	896		23.2%
1960	1,292		44.2%
1970	1,448		12.1%
1980	1,508		4.1%
1990	1,287		−14.7%
2000	1,330		3.3%
2010	1,626		22.3%
2020	1,371		−15.7%
U.S. Decennial Census

=== 2020 census ===
Rose Hill racial composition
Race	Number	Percentage
White (non-Hispanic)	553	40.34%
Black or African American (non-Hispanic)	365	26.62%
Native American	8	0.58%
Asian	5	0.36%
Other/Mixed	33	2.41%
Hispanic or Latino	407	29.69%

As of the 2020 United States census, there were 1,371 people, 823 households, and 554 families residing in the town.

=== 2000 census ===
As of the census of 2000, 1,330 people, 542 households, and 377 families resided in the town. The population density was 969.4 inhabitants per square mile (374.3/km^{2}). The 594 housing units averaged 433.0 per square mile (167.4/km^{2}). The racial makeup of the town was 62.93% White, 25.26% African American, 0.75% Native American, 0.53% Asian, 0.08% Pacific Islander, 9.92% from other races, and 0.53% from two or more races. Hispanics or Latinos of any race were 14.74% of the population.

Of the 542 households, 26.8% had children under the age of 18 living with them, 51.1% were married couples living together, 14.6% had a female householder with no husband present, and 30.3% were not families. About 27.7% of all households were made up of individuals, and 15.3% had someone living alone who was 65 years of age or older. The average household size was 2.45 and the average family size was 2.92.

In the town, the population was distributed as 21.3% under the age of 18, 9.5% from 18 to 24, 27.3% from 25 to 44, 24.4% from 45 to 64, and 17.6% who were 65 years of age or older. The median age was 39 years. For every 100 females, there were 86.0 males. For every 100 females age 18 and over, there were 82.4 males.

The median income for a household in the town was $27,794, and for a family was $36,786. Males had a median income of $27,171 versus $17,411 for females. The per capita income for the town was $16,943. About 15.7% of families and 19.9% of the population were below the poverty line, including 21.2% of those under age 18 and 16.9% of those age 65 or over.

== Notable people ==
- Ralph Britt, NFL tight end
- Aaron Fussell, North Carolina politician and educator
- Wendell H. Murphy, farmer and North Carolina politician
- Jamie Pickett Ultimate Fighting Championship Middleweight Athlete
