= WTOW =

Washington, North Carolina; United States
- Frequency: 1320 kHz

Programming
- Format: Defunct (formerly Gospel music)

History
- First air date: September 6, 1961 (as WEEW)
- Last air date: June 1, 2018
- Former call signs: WEEW (1961–1983); WWGN (1983–1989)

Technical information
- Facility ID: 31856
- Class: D
- Power: 500 watts day 45 watts night
- Transmitter coordinates: 35°32′7″N 77°4′4″W

WTOW (1320 AM) was a radio station broadcasting a Gospel music format. Licensed to Washington, North Carolina, United States, the station was owned by Shabach Media Group. As of June 1, 2018, the station went silent.

== History ==
=== 2003 license renewal fine ===
Former owner James Rouse/The Minority Voice was issued a $13,000 fine for failure to renew WTOW's license in a timely manner in August 2003 leading up to its expiration date of December 1, 2003. The fine was issued on April 2, 2008.

=== License deletion ===
On July 31, 2019, WTOW's license was deleted by the FCC due to being silent over a one-year period.

== See also ==
List of radio stations in North Carolina
