= WJXY =

WJXY may refer to:

- WMIR (AM), a radio station (1200 AM) licensed to serve Atlantic Beach, South Carolina, United States, which held the callsign WJXY from 2017 until March 23, 2021.
- WGLD-FM, a radio station (93.9 FM) licensed to serve Conway, South Carolina, which held the call sign WJXY-FM from 1990 to 2017
- WAYS (AM), a radio station (1050 AM) licensed to serve Conway, South Carolina, which held the call sign WJXY until 2000
