= Andrulonis Media =

American multimedia marketing firm

Andrulonis Media, LLC is a multimedia marketing firm that owns several radio stations in the United States. It is controlled by the Andrulonis family and currently has stations based in the Grand Strand of South Carolina and Cumberland County in North Carolina.

== History ==
The company began operations in Pennsylvania as "Colonial Media Group." It first invested in the Twin Tiers radio market in 2008. The company strategy was to take rimshot signals in farther-flung boroughs such as Kane and Coudersport and move them to towns adjacent to the area's largest city in Olean, hoping to gain market share from the two main broadcasters in the area, Backyard Broadcasting (then owners of WPIG, the dominant station in the region, now owned by Seven Mountains Media) and Pembrook Pines Media Group (whose stations are now owned by Waypoint Media). From 2011 to 2013, Colonial operated a local television station in Olean. In 2018, Andrulonis announced the sale of the last of those stations to Rick Freeman, a Scranton-based businessman previously in the newspaper industry. Andrulonis and agreed to sell the stations to Freeman in a transaction consisting of 10% cash (to consummate a time-brokerage agreement until the sale consummates) and 90% cryptocurrency, the first time cryptocurrency has ever been used in a broadcast license transaction; he stated that "it was time" for him to give up the stations to someone else more interested in building them. The terms of the sale required Freeman to cover any shortfall in cash if the cryptocurrency lost value, and he was unable to do so after cryptocurrencies entered a declining market in 2018. Colonial then sold one of the stations to Family Life Network, a regional Christian broadcaster, in December, and another to upstart broadcaster Bob Lowe in November 2019, finally selling the last to Seven Mountains (who a few months later spun it off to Family Life) in October 2020.

In 2016, CEO Jeff Androulonis called East Carolina University's national anthem protest a "shameful" disrespect of the U.S. military and, in counterprotest and in concurrence with the company's advertisers, dropped a planned broadcast of the team's game against the University of South Florida from WFAY.

In March 2019, Colonial Media and Entertainment changed its name to Andrulonis Media. With the change, the company shuttered its New York operations and, with the FCC eliminating its Main Studio Rule, began operating its remaining station there via automation and voice-tracking from the Carolinas until spinning the station off a year later.

Colonial also previously invested in stations in Williamsport, Pennsylvania. Andrulonis's partners in the Williamsport stations bought him out in 2010, continuing to identify as "Colonial Radio Group of Williamsport;" eventually coming under the ownership of Todd Bartley in 2013. Bartley went bankrupt and, in 2020, sold Colonial Radio Group of Williamsport to Seven Mountains Media, a regional broadcaster.

Andrulonis also began divesting his Carolinas cluster in 2021, selling WYAY and WMIR-FM to Maryland Media One, another station to GT Radio, and a third to Gorilla Broadcasting in early 2022. With the sale, all of Andrulonis's remaining radio licenses are AM radio signals. Andrulonis began the process of buying back its Carolina assets in late 2023.

== Current assets ==
=== Radio ===
Sorted by format:

Country music (Carolina Country)

WFAY, AM 1230, Fayetteville, North Carolina

Classic rock (Rock without the Hard Edge)

WMRV, AM 1450, Spring Lake, North Carolina (The River)

Rejoice! Musical Soul Food

WMIR, AM 1200, Atlantic Beach, South Carolina

=== Events ===
Carolina Country Music Awards

== Former assets ==
=== South Carolina ===
- Camden: WEAF

WMIR-FM, FM 93.9, Conway, South Carolina(sold) to Maryland Media One)
WPGI, FM 93.7, Georgetown, South Carolina (sold to Joseph Rice and Todd Fowler)
WNMB, AM 900, North Myrtle Beach, South Carolina (sold to Gorilla Broadcasting Company)

=== North Carolina ===
WYAY, FM 106.3, Bolivia, North Carolina (sold to Maryland Media One)

=== Pennsylvania ===
- Apollo: WAVL, AM 910
- Kane/Eldred: WBYB/WVTT, FM 103.9
- Smethport: WXMT, FM 106.3
- Bradford: Bradford Speedway
- Williamsport: WLYC, AM 1050

=== New York ===
- Olean: WVTT-CA/TV 25 (local marketing agreement)
- Portville WAGL, FM 96.7
