= WTKN =

- Murrells Inlet, South Carolina; United States
- Broadcast area: Grand Strand
- Frequency: 94.5 MHz
- Branding: Talk 94.5 & 106.7

Programming
- Format: Conservative talk
- Affiliations: Fox News Radio; Premiere Networks; Salem Radio Network; Westwood One

Ownership
- Owner: John and Blake Byrne; (Byrne Acquisition Group MB, LLC)
- Sister stations: WEZV; WYEZ

History
- First air date: February 1991 (as WKOA)
- Former call signs: WKOA (1991–1992); WRNN (1992–2000); WMYB (August 11–30, 2000); WJYR (August 30 – September 15, 2000); WYEZ (2000-2019)

Technical information
- Licensing authority: FCC
- Facility ID: 34901
- Class: C3
- ERP: 12,000 watts
- HAAT: 145 meters (476 ft)
- Transmitter coordinates: 33°33′13.6″N 79°13′13.2″W
- Repeater: 1240 WLSQ (Loris)

Links
- Public license information: Public file; LMS
- Webcast: Listen live
- Website: www.talk945.com

WTKN (94.5 FM) is a news/talk radio station licensed to Murrells Inlet, South Carolina, and serving the Grand Strand area. The Byrne Acquisition Group outlet is licensed by the Federal Communications Commission (FCC) to broadcast with an effective radiated power (ERP) of 12 kW. The station uses the name "Talk 94.5 & 106.7". Its studios are located in Myrtle Beach, South Carolina and its transmitter is located in Plantersville, South Carolina.

== History ==
In February 1991, WKOA first went on the air on 94.5. The station had been programmed as an all-oldies station after listener questionnaires appeared in local newspapers asking readers what type of format was needed for a new radio station that was going to be coming in February 1991. The winning format was oldies, though former Top-40 outlet WSYN-FM Sunny 106.5 had just gone all-oldies in May 1990. The new Koast 94.5 played an odd sort of oldies, many of which were not heard on Sunny 106.5. The playlist was somewhat small. "Dancing Queen" by ABBA, "Torn Between Two Lovers", and "Tom Dooley" by The Kingston Trio were some of the oldies played over and over again on WKOA-FM. By late 1992, Koast 94.5 was dead and talk radio station WRNN took over. The Tom Snyder Radio Show was one of their early shows. The format lasted for almost eight years on 94.5 FM.

In 2000, WRNN-FM "Hot Talk 94.5", a 6,000-watt station, traded frequencies with WMYB "Star 99.5", a 25,000-watt station, for a few weeks. WMYB soon moved to 92.1, leaving the frequency vacant. WEZV needed better coverage of the south end of the market, so a simulcast began. The simulcast ended on July 26, 2007, when WYEZ switched to a soft AC format as "Yes 94.5". On March 17, 2008, the format was tweaked to a mainstream AC format.

The switch to rhythmic AC took place on September 2, 2008. While the station was consulted by Alan Burns and used the "Movin" name, it was not a rhythmic adult contemporary, to which the Movin' name usually refers. WYEZ was the second rhythmic oldies station that used the slogan, the first being KMVN in Los Angeles, California, which has since changed. The slogan was "Picks You Up and Makes You Feel Good".

Wally B., program director and morning host, said that in fall 2013 on "Vinally Fridays", the station gave away vinyl albums in listener contests as part of the vinyl revival. These included artists heard on the station such as Michael Jackson, Hall & Oates, Earth, Wind & Fire and Prince.

On April 21, 2015, WYEZ changed their format to adult contemporary, branded as "94.5 The Tide", with the slogan "Today’s Best & Yesterday’s Favorites." WYEZ added John Tesh late in 2016.

New PD and Morning show host Nick Summers' debut was in April 2016 and introduced the Tide Morning Roll. The new station slogan was updated to "Your Life. Your Music" in 2017. Elton John and The Eagles were dropped, with their songs moving to WEZV/WGTN-FM. The focus became artists such as Taylor Swift, Fifth Harmony and Justin Timberlake.

Logo before simulcasting with WLSQ

On April 22, 2019, Byrne Acquisition Group announced that 94.5 would flip from hot adult contemporary to conservative talk as "Talk 94.5" (with new callsign WTKN) on May 6. Former WRNN-FM morning co-host Liz Callaway would anchor mornings, followed by a syndicated lineup including Glenn Beck, Dennis Prager, Ben Shapiro, Larry Elder, Sebastian Gorka, and Red Eye Radio.
