= WSYN =

Radio station in Surfside Beach, South Carolina

- Surfside Beach, South Carolina; United States
- Broadcast area: Grand Strand
- Frequency: 103.1 MHz
- Branding: Sunny 103.1

Programming
- Format: Classic hits

Ownership
- Owner: Cumulus Media; (Cumulus Licensing LLC)
- Sister stations: WDAI, WAYS, WSEA, WLFF

History
- First air date: 1977 (as WYAK-FM)
- Former call signs: WYAK-FM (1977–2008)
- Call sign meaning: "Sunny"

Technical information
- Licensing authority: FCC
- Facility ID: 46964
- Class: C3
- ERP: 8,000 watts
- HAAT: 161 meters (528 ft)
- Transmitter coordinates: 33°47′6.00″N 78°52′44.00″W

Links
- Public license information: Public file; LMS
- Webcast: Listen Live; Listen Live via iHeart
- Website: sunny1031.com

WSYN (103.1 FM, "Sunny 103.1") is a classic hits music formatted radio station licensed to Surfside Beach, South Carolina and serves the Grand Strand area. The Cumulus Media outlet is licensed by the Federal Communications Commission (FCC) to broadcast at 103.1 MHz with an ERP of 8 kW. Its current slogan is "The Grand Strand's Greatest Hits". Its studios are located on U.S. Highway 17 in Murrells Inlet, South Carolina, and its transmitter is located in Carolina Forest.

== History ==
103.1 signed on as WYAK-FM "Big Yak" with a country music format in 1977. In 1985 the name changed to Y-103 under new owners who wanted a different image. WYAK DJs at that time included John Dixon, Ralph Connor and Steve Mimms. WROQ FM personality Chris Lee began his radio career at WYAK in 1985

An AM frequency was added at 1270 which as of 1984 simulcast the FM. WYAK (AM) changed format January 1, 1989, calling itself WXMB and playing Christian country music. The AM station became WYAK again later, airing Rush Limbaugh starting in mid-1991. Later the AM station played R & B oldies as WCKN, using the WCIN classic oldies format, but signed off.

During the mid-1990s WYAK-FM, owned by Multi-Market Radio Inc., was also heard on WVCO 94.9. On October 1, 1996, Pinnacle Broadcasting Co., owner of WYAV, announced its purchase of WYAK, WMYB, and WRNN-FM. Pinnacle intended to continue managing WVCO, though that station began separate programming in 1997.

WYAK returned to the Big Yak name in 1999 and moved Rick Roberts to mornings with Tab Allen for "Big Yak Mornings with Rick and Tab". Allen's previous partner Michale Jeffries moved to middays and program director Frankie B was afternoon host. After ten years, Allen was let go December 30, 1999, replaced by Holli Heart, formerly of WGTR. Dave Priest was program director for Pinnacle's stations. In 2000, it reverted to the K-103 name.

WSYN and WYAK switched frequencies and were reborn as Sunny 103.1 WSYN and The Coyote 106.5 (WLFF).

WSYN also switched to the "True Oldies" feed; many 1950s and 1960s Oldies were once again heard. Later, with some programming also being done locally, the playlist included many 1960s oldies and also some 1950s ones as well blended in with the mostly early 1970s oldies along with some Carolina beach music classics like "Sixty Minute Man" by Billy Ward (1949).

In January 2010, Craig Russ, the Operations Manager of the Cumulus Cluster, became Program Director of the station. Personalities included Kenzie (from 104.9 BOB-FM) and Craig Russ (also former Program Director of BOB-FM) in afternoon drive.

In April 2016, WSYN added "Casey Kasem’s American Top 40 – The 80s". The station promotes the Awesome '80s Weekends.
