= WVCO =

- Loris, South Carolina; United States
- Broadcast area: Myrtle Beach, South Carolina; Wilmington, North Carolina
- Frequencies: 94.9 MHz (Channel 235)
- Branding: 94.9 The Surf

Programming
- Format: Oldies/Beach music

Ownership
- Owner: Carolina Beach Music Broadcasting Corp.

History
- First air date: 1993

Technical information
- Licensing authority: FCC
- Facility ID: 57036
- Class: C3
- ERP: 11,000 watts
- HAAT: 149 meters
- Transmitter coordinates: 33°59′39.00″N 78°46′16.00″W

Links
- Public license information: Public file; LMS
- Webcast: Listen Live
- Website: 949thesurf.com

WVCO (94.9 FM, "94.9 The Surf") is an American radio station in the Myrtle Beach, South Carolina, market. They play a mix of Blues/Carolina beach music/shag. Its studios are located on Ocean Boulevard in North Myrtle Beach, and its transmitter is southeast of Loris.

== History ==
=== As a country music station ===
By the mid-1990s, WVCO aired the same programming as WYAK, which was country music. On October 1, 1996, Pinnacle Broadcasting Co. announced its purchase of WYAK, WMYB and WRNN-FM. After the transaction was completed, Pinnacle intended to renew the lease with the previous owners of WVCO.

=== “W-Elvis” & smooth jazz ===
On January 1, 1997, the station played "Macarena" over 2,000 times (including several mixes) then became "WELVIS" for the weekend of Elvis Presley's 62nd birthday, then stunted with various musical styles, and finally switched to smooth jazz.

After Frank Sinatra died, WVCO played just his music the entire weekend.

=== WVCO flips to Beach Music ===
On August 18 and 19, 1998, the station repeatedly played Vanessa L. Williams singing the words "pick the pieces up and start again" followed by a tape rewinding. The new beach music format began with "Summertime" by Billy Stewart. This marked the first time the music that began along the Grand Strand had a radio home. WVCO was the first full-time Beach Music station on the Grand Strand. The first full-time station (in the U.S.) was 100,000 watt WRDX, Beach 106, which Fessa' John Hook launched in Salisbury, NC in October 1986.

John Hook, Beach Music radio authority/consultant consulted Gary Morris, WVCO general manager from 1998 to 1999.

"Fessa" John Hook hosted the syndicated "Top 40 Countdown", "Fish Fry Show" and "Classics Show" on the Rhythm 'N Beach Network, including WVCO, and "Ocean Drive Pavilion Show", on WVCO only. 94.9 the Surf described its music format as "Beach, Boogie and Blues". The music was categorized as rhythmic oldies but included much more variety than the typical radio station. Many songs were from the 1950s, and the station's focus was beach music, a style made popular on the South Carolina coast. Personalities included Billy Smith, Ted Bell, Ray Scott and Stevie Blackburn. The station aired the syndicated On the Beach radio show hosted by Charlie Brown.

From spring to fall 1999, Hook was brought in to emcee live remote broadcasts Noon to 6 each Saturday and Sunday. In the course of the year, Hook, Earl Taylor, and station owner Deane Morris developed a relationship which bore fruit in February 2000 when Taylor and Morris brought Hook in as the morning drive DJ, as well as emcee of live remote Deck parties from five different venues, every Monday-Friday afternoon.

In 2001/02 Hook and Taylor pioneered Grand Strand webstreaming by putting WVCO's broadcast live on the Internet.

In 2002, Hook presented a business plan to WVCO colleague Earl Taylor and Harvey Graham which included the 10,000-square-foot Born In the Carolinas museum, the WVCO webstream, a live Sunday night simulcast of Born In the Carolinas Live (from 2001 Nightclub's ballroom), along with merchandising and sponsorship modules. Two corporations followed: one constituted by WVCO was split 51%, 24%, and 24% by Graham, Hook, and Taylor respectively, while the Born In the Carolinas museum and its holdings were captained by Graham 51% and Hook 49%.

In summer 2003, the Born In the Carolinas Live shows, managed and facilitated by Susan and Donny Trexler, Andy Bickle, Kay Mattox, and Kathy Hardwick, presented 26 shows featuring a wide spectrum of Beach Bands, along with national artists including Cuba Gooding, Keisa Brown, Barbara Carr, and many others.

Audio engineer Steve Durr was brought by Hook from Nashville to design the stage, sound system, and audio/video mixing room for the Born in the Carolinas museum. Durr was legendary, having designed the Sydney Opera House system in Australia, and a host of NASCAR race track sound systems.

Hook presented a business/sponsorship plan to Pepsi Regional and National bringing them to the table for a six-figure title sponsorship. Ten more sponsors were signed at $75,000 each. Not long after Graham and Taylor expunged Hook in early 2004. All sponsors signed out, the Born in the Carolinas museum died on the vine. Durr's sound system was returned.

In 2006, WVCO moved its studio from Myrtle Beach (inside the shell of the Born In the Carolinas museum) to 429 Pine Avenue in North Myrtle Beach, also the home of WNMB/900 and the former home of WNMB/105.5. In 2011, WVCO found its permanent home in the Horseshoe Section of Ocean Drive, inside Hoto's Beach Club.

WVCO added the syndicated Mike Harvey show and Clemson University football and basketball.

WVCO was named Station of the Year at the Carolina Beach Music Awards for ten years in a row and was inducted into CBMA Radio Station Hall of Fame

In mid-December 2010, WVCO owner Harvey Graham died. The station returned to the air on April 14, 2011, with reduced power but restored to full power operation by May 2011 under new owners Norman-Worley. Ted Bell moved back to WVCO to host a midday show. In October 2012, WVCO partner Bill Norman died and ownership and operations continues today under Worley.

In 2011 Jason Justice joined WVCO with "The Judge" and "Fat Harold's LIVE"

In 2012 Stephen Blackburn joined WVCO with "Mornings with Stevie B"

In 2016 Mike Worley joined WVCO with Edge Entertainment's "The Edge Radio Show"

In 2017 Jim Morgan joined WVCO with the program "A Joyful Noise" Sunday mornings and in January 2018 became their morning show host.

== Death of WVCO co-owner Bill Norman and subsequent investigation ==
Owner Bill Norman suffered a serious stroke on September 29, 2012, and died at Grand Strand Regional Medical Center on October 14, 2012, from what initially was labelled a "cerebral vascular accident" on the death certificate. On October 19, 2012, the Myrtle Beach Police Department launched an investigation into Norman's death. WMBF-TV reported on December 6–7, 2012, that a 53-year-old nurse, Janet Kupka, had given Norman 20 milligrams of morphine instead of the prescribed 4 milligrams. Kupka allegedly admitted to a witness that she gave Norman the drug Diprivan. Norman was brain dead due to the stroke. Norman's body had been cremated and was not available to be autopsied. The cause of death may be changed to an overdose.
