= WYAY =

WYAY may refer to:

- WYAY (FM), a radio station (106.3 FM) licensed to serve Bolivia, North Carolina
- WPGI, a radio station (93.7 FM) licensed to serve Georgetown, South Carolina, which held the call sign WYAY from 2019 to 2020
- WCOR-FM, a radio station (96.7 FM) licensed to serve Lewis Run, Pennsylvania, United States, which held the call sign WYAY for a brief time in 2019
- WAKL (FM), a radio station (106.7 FM) licensed to serve Gainesville, Georgia, United States, which held the call sign WYAY from 1984 to 2019
