= WGTN =

WGTN or Wgtn may refer to:

- WGTN (AM), a radio station (1400 AM) licensed to Georgetown, South Carolina, United States
- WYEZ, a radio station (100.7 FM) licensed to Andrews, South Carolina, United States which held the call sign WGTN-FM from 1990 to 2019
- Wellington, the capital city of New Zealand, which is often abbreviated to Wgtn
