= WMIR =

WMIR may refer to:

- WMIR (AM), a radio station (1200 AM) licensed to serve Atlantic Beach, South Carolina, United States
- WGLD-FM, a radio station (93.9 FM) licensed to serve Conway, South Carolina, which held the call signs WMIR and WMIR-FM from 2017 to 2022
