= WSEA =

- Atlantic Beach, South Carolina; United States
- Broadcast area: Grand Strand
- Frequency: 100.3 MHz
- Branding: 100.3 The Game

Programming
- Format: Sports
- Affiliations: Westwood One Sports; Carolina Panthers; Charlotte FC; Coastal Carolina Chanticleers

Ownership
- Owner: Cumulus Media; (Cumulus Licensing LLC)
- Sister stations: WDAI, WSYN, WLFF, WAYS

History
- First air date: 1991 (as WPAW)
- Former call signs: WPAW (10/4/1991-3/22/1993)
- Call sign meaning: Referring to the SEA

Technical information
- Licensing authority: FCC
- Facility ID: 3221
- Class: C3
- ERP: 12,000 watts
- HAAT: 145 meters (476 ft)
- Transmitter coordinates: 33°47′3.00″N 78°52′44.00″W

Links
- Public license information: Public file; LMS
- Webcast: Listen live Listen Live via iHeart
- Website: www.thegamemyrtlebeach.com

WSEA (100.3 FM) — branded as Sports Radio 100.3 "The Game" Myrtle Beach — is a sports radio station licensed to Atlantic Beach, South Carolina and serves the Grand Strand area. The Cumulus Media outlet is licensed by the Federal Communications Commission (FCC) to broadcast with an ERP of 12 kW. Its studios are located on U.S. Highway 17 in Murrells Inlet, South Carolina, and its transmitter is located in Carolina Forest.

== History ==
WSEA was originally licensed to Pawleys Island with coordinates 33°26′20″N 79°8′11″W.

100.3 signed on with sounds of the ocean in the mid-90s, but then went silent. For a while it aired the programming of WWXM. In September 1998, Cumulus Media purchased WSEA, which had gone dark, from Pamplico Broadcasting. The station became "Pirate 100" playing "focused, guitar-based rock" from the late 70s to the 90s. With a newspaper ad campaign that included the words "Jump Ship", John Boy and Billy debuted on WSEA early in 1999, including "John Boy and Billy's Rock & Roll Racing" on Sundays. Diane Costello was midday host. WSEA/WJXY-FM/WXJY program director Buzz Elliott had the afternoon shift (in addition to a morning show on his other two stations), and Shaggy was evening DJ. With a 2,750-watt signal, WSEA had its tower near Carolina Forest. Adding John Boy and Billy gave WSEA an audience five times what it had previously, ten times larger in the morning.

Eventually WJXY-FM, a CHR station, put its programming on WSEA before switching to all sports. Early in 2006, Rose Rock, mother of Chris Rock, had a talk show on WSEA.

Later, the station became "Hot 100," with a contemporary hit radio format, airing Bob & Sheri from Lincoln-Financial Radio's The Link in Charlotte, North Carolina and Ace & TJ Mornings from CBS Radio's Kiss 95.1 in Charlotte, North Carolina. "Hot 100" never really came close to "Mix 97.7" in the ratings.

"Power 100.3" signed on April 4, 2009 with the sounds of Hip Hop & R&B.

former logo

However, as with most Cumulus-owned stations, they were billing themselves as a Rhythmic CHR and using the slogan "#1 for Hits & Hip Hop" as the station targeted a broader multi-racial audience. WSEA 100.3 began stunting during Independence Day holiday weekend of 2010. At 10:03 am on July 5, 2010, WSEA became "i100" with a contemporary hit radio format created by Jan Jeffries, senior vice president for programming of Cumulus Media. Craig Russ was the program director for the station. WXJY 93.7 FM simulcast the format.

On March 5, 2012, WSEA became the new Myrtle Beach affiliate of ESPN Radio, moving from sister station WJXY-FM, which picked up WSEA's contemporary hit radio format.

In Fall 2012, WSEA added hourly updates from CBS Sports Radio from Boomer Esiason, Tom Tolbert, and Doug Gottlieb. The station changed from ESPN to CBS Sports Radio on January 2, 2013. The station also added an hour to the show in August 2011. Sports Talk, hosted by Phil Kornblut and Kevin McCreary on stations throughout South Carolina, continued to air.

== Current on-air programming ==
Sports Radio 100.3 "The Game" currently airs CBS Sports Radio's nationally syndicated shows including John Feinstein, Maggie and Perloff, Jim Rome, Chris Moore and Brian Jones and Scott Ferrall.

The station mixes nationally syndicated shows with a variety of local programming.

On August 28, 2023 WSEA rebranded as "100.3 The Game". The station operates as a half-day (6 a.m. to 6 p.m.) simulcast of sister station WNKT in Eastover.

=== Chanticleer sports ===
Coastal Carolina Chanticleers WSEA is the flagship station for Coastal Carolina University sports. The station airs a variety of Chanticleer baseball, softball, basketball, football and other sports games. Matt Hogue announces a majority of the sporting events aired on the station.

As of August 2017, CCU Sports moved to crosstown station WRNN.

=== High school sports coverage ===
"The Team" airs play by play coverage of both high school football and basketball. During the 2012 and 2013 high school football season, "The Team" covered play by play of the Carolina Forest Panthers. In 2013, the station introduced "The High School Basketball Game of the Week" which features two grand strand high school basketball match ups a week.

On Fridays during the sports season, Lewis Woodard hosted a weekly wrap up show featuring interviews with local coaches, players and announcers.

In 2017, The Carolina Forest Panthers football moved to sister station 1050am WHSC and simulcast on 101.9 W270BZ (Conway). Which brought Socastee Braves Football to The Team.

=== Sports Talk ===
"The Game" airs the statewide syndicated show "Sports Talk" with Phil Kornblut and Kevin McCreary.

== The Drive with Aaron Marks ==
The Drive was a local sports talk show that focused most of its attention on sports in the southeastern part of the United States, the Grand Strand Area and major topics in the sports world.

The show which first aired on August 1, 2011 was hosted by Aaron Marks and co-hosted by Lewis Woodard a Virginia native, who took listeners through a 2-hour show filled with interviews from across the country. The show was produced by Justin "J.D." Padgett and assisted by the interns. The show featured a couple segments including Cruzin the Region which included interviews dealing with topics in the southeastern part of the United States.

The show featured "Local Sports Reports" every 20 minutes (except at the top of the hour).

WSEA moved The Drive from its afternoon time-slot to the morning time-slot, airing from 6:00 a.m. to 9:00 a.m. weekday mornings starting February 10, 2014. This replaced Tiki Barber, Brandon Tierney and Dana Jacobson, whose CBS program had aired on the station since January 2013.

== Local On-air personalities ==
The Press box

- Allen Smothers
- Wally B (Producer and On-Air)
- James Clark (Producer and On-Air)

Former

- Aaron Marks (host)
- Lewis Woodard (host and local update announcer)
- Justin Padgett (producer)
- Nick Baldino (play by play host)
- Ashton Leatherman (intern)
