= WLFF =

- Georgetown, South Carolina; United States
- Broadcast area: Myrtle Beach, South Carolina
- Frequency: 106.5 MHz
- Branding: 106.5 Nash Icon

Programming
- Format: Classic country
- Affiliations: Westwood One

Ownership
- Owner: Cumulus Media; (Cumulus Licensing LLC)
- Sister stations: WDAI; WSEA; WSYN; WAYS

History
- First air date: May 1, 1973 (as WSHG at 106.3)
- Former call signs: WSHG (1973–1982); WAZX (1982–1988); WSYN (1988–2008)
- Former frequencies: 106.3 MHz (1973–1988)
- Call sign meaning: WoLFF (former branding)

Technical information
- Licensing authority: FCC
- Facility ID: 63932
- Class: C2
- ERP: 50,000 watts
- HAAT: 150 meters (490 ft)
- Transmitter coordinates: 33°26′20.00″N 79°8′11.00″W

Links
- Public license information: Public file; LMS
- Webcast: Listen live Listen Live (iHeart)
- Website: 1065nashicon.com

WLFF (106.5 FM), known on-air as 106.5 Nash Icon, is a gold-based country music radio station licensed to Georgetown, South Carolina. The station is owned by Cumulus Media and broadcasts with an ERP of 50 kW. Its studios are located on U.S. Highway 17 in Murrells Inlet, South Carolina, and its transmitter is located near Pawleys Island, South Carolina.

== History ==
106.5 was previously WAZX, a Top 40 (CHR) station in Georgetown, South Carolina at 106.3. In 1988, the station increased its power to 50,000 watts and changed to the Sunny 106.5 name and WSYN call letters, with a hot adult contemporary format. During this time in 1988, the WSYN-FM Sunny 106.5 studios were moved to a small Frontage Road Studio off of U.S. Highway 17 By-Pass in Surfside Beach (next door to the offices of Clearview Cable TV that then became Jones Intercable in late 1988). The move of the studios to Surfside Beach and the name change to Sunny 106.5 generated a huge advertising campaign in the local media and a newly designed Sunny 106.5 logo. The staff of veteran Myrtle Beach broadcasters included Tom Brockway (mornings) and "Kahuna" (afternoons). The station was consulted by legendary consultant Tom Collins.

From 1990 to April 2008, WSYN was known as "Oldies Radio Sunny 106.5 FM".

During its heyday of playing oldies radio on the coast of South Carolina, WSYN was owned by Seacoast Radio Company LLC and was South Carolina Broadcasters Association Station of The Year in 1996 and 1997.

Oldies Radio Sunny 106.5 employed an on-air reverb effect, producing a "bigger than life" sound, and served as home to many well-known local talents including Kemosabi Joe, "The Freakin' Deacon", Diane Costello, Michael Parnell, Kelly Broderick, djrockinray, Sissy Hall, Robert Kessler, Lou Krieger, and CJ Jackson, who also was the engineer at the time.

Horry County Council Chair Liz Gilland at one time hosted a Sunday morning gospel program on the station.

Syndicated weekly programs included The Charlie Byrd Beach Blast, Mike Harvey's Super Gold, American Gold with Dick Bartley, and Beatle Brunch.

Cumulus Media bought WSYN, WJXY, WJXY-FM, WXJY, WDAI, and WSEA in its first year of existence.

In 1999, Mike Lawrence took over as operations manager for Cumulus' Myrtle Beach stations and became afternoon DJ on WSYN. Cumulus market manager David Lewis said that among the changes planned was getting rid of the reverb effect and updating the playlist. Also, midday DJ Gary "Deacon" Dawson and morning host Kemosabe Joe traded shifts. Dawson was in his fifth year at WSYN, starting with the night shift and later moving to afternoons. Although WSYN considered moving away from 1950s' music, the station began "spotlighting" them.

Frank Barnhill served as the News and Sports Director for the station during two different tenures, for many years dating back to the 1990s. His position was eliminated by Market Manager Layne Ryan in May 2007.

On April 2, 2008, Al Connors and Krieger, the only DJs still working for the station, said they were told "restructuring" was planned and they too would lose their jobs.

On April 7, 2008, WYAK moved to 106.5, keeping the country format, and changing its name to 106.5 The Wolf. Sunny 106.5 moved to 103.1 FM. Less than two weeks after WYAK's re-incarnation as WLFF, Cumulus changed WLFF to 106.5 The Coyote. A likely reason was the proximity of 96.9 The Wolf in Charleston, S.C.; both country stations overlap in Georgetown County.

On September 6, 2013, WLFF kept the country format, but underwent a name change to Nash FM 106.5. On February 10, 2014, program director Night Train moved to afternoons, with his morning show replaced by America's Morning Show. Nash Nights Live airs during the evening hours, Kickin' It with Kix during the overnight hours, and American Country Countdown is heard on weekends.

On February 26, 2024, WLFF changed its format from country to classic country, branded as "106.5 Nash Icon".

== Previous logo ==
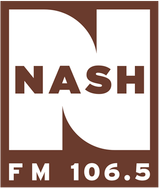
