= WMRV =

WMRV may refer to:

- WMRV (AM), a radio station (1450 AM) licensed to serve Spring Lake, North Carolina, United States
- WDXT, a radio station (93.9 FM) licensed to serve Dansville, New York, United States, which held the call sign WMRV from 2013 to 2017
- WBNW-FM, a radio station (105.7 FM) licensed to serve Endicott, New York, which held the call sign WMRV or WMRV-FM from 1969 to 2013
