= WDTW =

WDTW may refer to:

- WDTW (AM), a radio station (1310 AM) licensed to Dearborn, Michigan, United States
- WLLZ (FM), a radio station (106.7 FM) licensed to Detroit, Michigan, United States, which held the call sign WDTW-FM from 2002 to 2019
- WLQB, a radio station (93.5 FM) licensed to Ocean Isle Beach, North Carolina, which briefly held the call sign WDTW-FM in 2019
