= WIQB =

WIQB may refer to:

- WAYS (AM), a radio station (1050 AM) licensed to serve Conway, South Carolina, United States, which held the call sign WIQB from 2000 to 2010
- WWWW-FM, a radio station (102.9 FM) licensed to serve Ann Arbor, Michigan, United States, which held the call signs WIQB and WIQB-FM from 1975 to 2000
