= WCIE =

WCIE may refer to:

- WCIE (FM), a radio station (91.5 FM) licensed to New Port Richey, Florida, United States
- WKES, a radio station (91.1 FM) licensed to Lakeland, Florida, which held the call signs WCIE from 1975 to 1988 and WCIE-FM from 1988 to 1997
- WMRV (AM), a radio station (1450 AM) licensed to Spring Lake, North Carolina, United States, which held the call sign WCIE from August 1988 to May 2008
