= WLSC =

WLSC may refer to:

- West Liberty State College
- WLSQ (AM), a radio station (1240 AM) licensed to serve Loris, South Carolina, United States, which held the call sign WLSC from 1958 to 1984 and from 1986 to 2023
