= WYNA =

Radio station in Calabash, North Carolina, serving Myrtle Beach, South Carolina

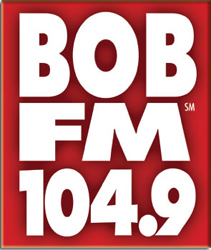
- Calabash, North Carolina; United States
- Broadcast area: Grand Strand
- Frequency: 104.9 MHz
- Branding: 104.9 Bob FM

Programming
- Format: Adult hits

Ownership
- Owner: iHeartMedia, Inc.; (iHM Licenses, LLC)
- Sister stations: WGTR; WLQB; WRXZ; WWXM

History
- First air date: September 1, 1965
- Former call signs: WTAB-FM (1965–1969); WKSM (1969–1979); WKSM-FM (1979–1986)

Technical information
- Licensing authority: FCC
- Facility ID: 24932
- Class: C3
- ERP: 25,000 watts
- HAAT: 100 meters (330 ft)
- Transmitter coordinates: 33°49′20″N 78°46′17″W

Links
- Public license information: Public file; LMS
- Webcast: Listen live (via iHeartRadio)
- Website: 1049bobfm.iheart.com

WYNA (104.9 FM) is an adult hits formatted radio station licensed to Calabash, North Carolina, and serving the Grand Strand area of South Carolina. The station, owned by iHeartMedia, is branded "104.9 Bob FM". Its studios are located on the U.S. 17 Bypass in Myrtle Beach, and its transmitter is located north of Atlantic Beach, South Carolina.

== History ==
WYNA began as WTAB-FM on September 1, 1965, as the sister station to WTAB (1370 AM) at Tabor City, North Carolina. When licensed to and located in Tabor City, this station played country music for most of the 1980s and 1990s, except for a brief time when the station played adult contemporary music starting in 1986 (this was preceded by stunting with marching band music). The WYNA call letters were chosen because the station was originally imaged as "Winner 104.9". In 1998, Pamplico Broadcasting bought the station, which played country music at that time, and increased its power from 3,000 to 25,000 Watts. After stunting with classical music in October and November 1998, and Christmas music in December, WYNA went off the air in preparation for a move that included changing its community of license to Calabash, North Carolina.

In January 1999, Coastline Communications bought WYNA from Pamplico Broadcasting. The studios moved to Wesley Street near Waccamaw Pottery in Myrtle Beach, South Carolina, former home to WBPR. WYNA became "Cool 104.9", a "groovin' oldies" station. Artists included Sam & Dave, Aretha Franklin, Earth, Wind & Fire, The O'Jays, Donna Summer, Kool & the Gang, Barry White, K.C. and the Sunshine Band, James Brown, The Three Degrees, The Trammps, Marvin Gaye, The Temptations and Stevie Wonder. "Billy Smith's Beach Party", hosted by WYNA's morning DJ, returned to the Grand Strand on Easter weekend after being gone for a decade. Later, rock was added to the music mix. Eventually, WGTN-FM in Georgetown, South Carolina, began airing the same programming as "Cool 100.7".

For several years before WYNA changed to adult hits as "Bob FM" in 2006, the two stations were hot adult contemporary, and WGTN-FM continued with that format.

In February 2008, Qantum Communications announced the purchase of WYNA for $5 million. The purchase allowed Qantum to change its station WRXZ from a similar format. Later in 2008, WGTN-FM ended its simulcast.

On May 15, 2014, Qantum Communications announced that it would sell its 29 stations, including WYNA, to Clear Channel Communications (now iHeartMedia), in a transaction connected to Clear Channel's sale of WALK AM-FM in Patchogue, New York, to Connoisseur Media via Qantum. The transaction was consummated on September 9, 2014.

On November 2, 2018, WYNA made a seasonal format change to an all-Christmas format. This happened again in 2019.
