= South Carolina Highway 65 =

Highway in South Carolina

South Carolina Highway 65
- Ocean Boulevard

Route information
- Maintained by SCDOT
- Length: 4.710 mi (7.580 km)
- Existed: 1960s–present

Major junctions
- South end: US 17 near Atlantic Beach
- North end: SC 9 in Cherry Grove Beach

Location
- Country: United States
- State: South Carolina
- Counties: Horry

Highway system
- South Carolina State Highway System; Interstate; US; State; Scenic
← SC 64	→ SC 66

South Carolina Highway 65 (also called Ocean Blvd, abbreviated SC 65) is a 4.710-mile (7.580 km) state highway in the U.S. state of South Carolina. It is the main thoroughfare through North Myrtle Beach. The highway is known for the origin of the official state dance, the Carolina shag.

== Route description ==
SC 65 begins at U.S. Route 17 (US 17) in North Myrtle Beach, near Atlantic Beach. It travels southeast along 27th Avenue South, heading one block towards the shoreline before turning northeast at South Ocean Boulevard, paralleling the ocean and shoreline businesses for the next 3 1/2 miles (5.6 km), including an intersection with Main Street. At the intersection with South Carolina Highway 9, SC 65 ends within the community of Cherry Grove Beach.

== History ==
=== South Carolina Highway 69 ===
South Carolina Highway 69
- Location: Atlantic Beach–Cherry Grove Beach
- Existed: 1977–1981

South Carolina Highway 69 (SC 69) was a state highway that was established in 1977 from U.S. Route 17 (US 17) in Atlantic Beach, up to Cherry Grove Beach, and then back to US 17. In 1981, it was decommissioned and redesignated as SC 65. Today, its northernmost portion is part of SC 9. This was done because of the sexual connotation of the number.

== Major intersections ==
The entire route is in North Myrtle Beach, Horry County.

mi	km	Destinations	Notes
0.000	0.000	US 17 (North Kings Highway) – North Myrtle Beach, Myrtle Beach	Southern terminus
4.710	7.580	SC 9 north (Sea Mountain Highway) / Ocean Boulevard – Loris	Northern terminus of SC 65; southern terminus of SC 9
1.000 mi = 1.609 km; 1.000 km = 0.621 mi
