= Cherry Grove Beach, South Carolina =

Cherry Grove Beach
- Neighbourhood
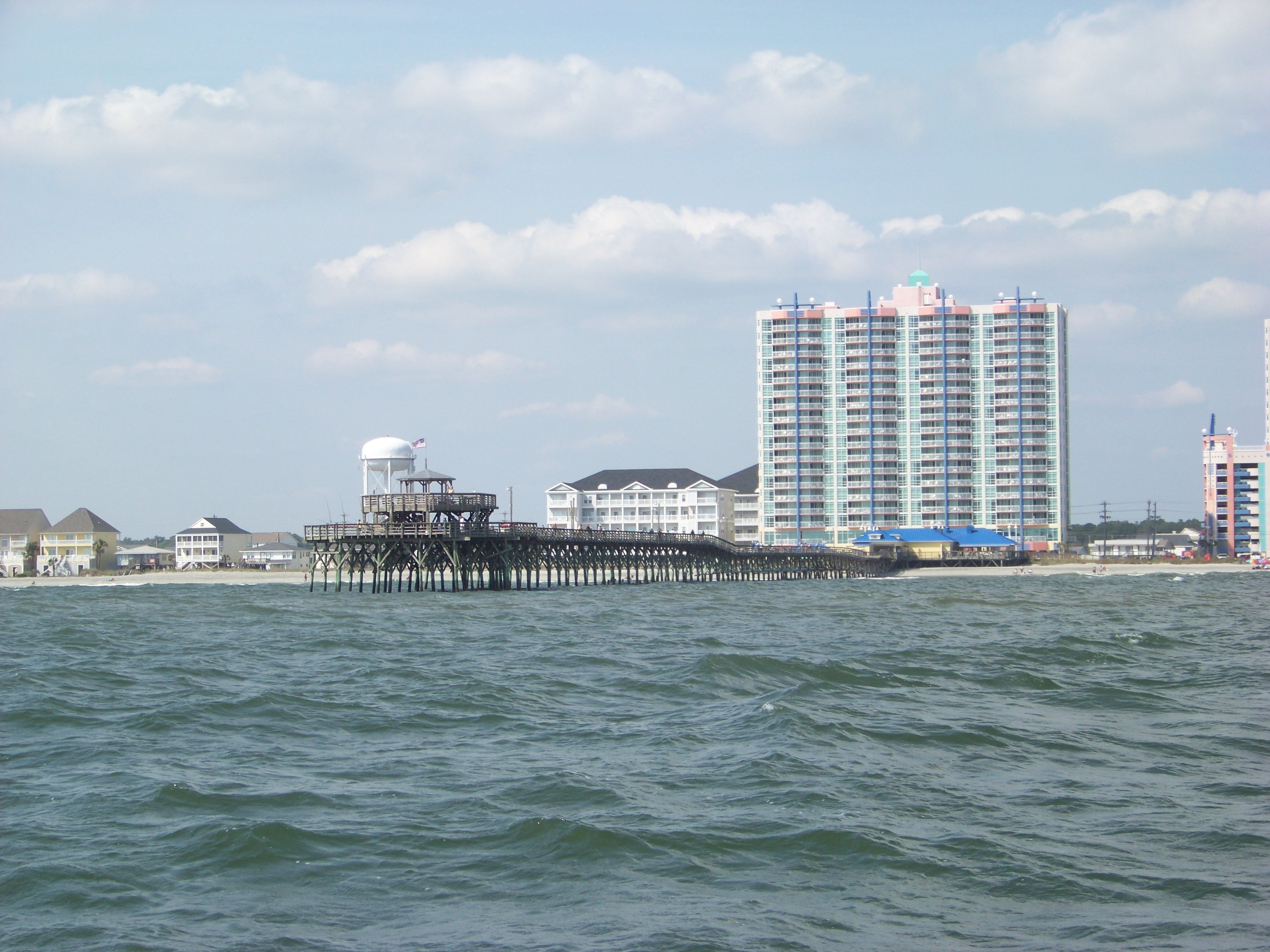
- The Cherry Grove Pier, as seen from the Atlantic Ocean.
- Nickname: Cherry Grove
- Location within South Carolina Location within the United States
- Coordinates: 33°49′39″N 78°38′34″W
- Country: United States
- State: South Carolina
- County: Horry
- City: North Myrtle Beach
- ZIP Code: 29582
- Area code: 843
- GNIS feature ID: 1227843

Cherry Grove Beach, sometimes known as Cherry Grove, is a neighborhood of the city of North Myrtle Beach in Horry County, South Carolina, United States. The community lies along South Carolina Highway 9 and South Carolina Highway 65. The Cherry Grove Pier is a popular landmark of Cherry Grove. It was built early in the 1950s. It has weathered many hurricanes, and was remodeled and lengthened in 1999 after Hurricane Floyd. In 1968 Cherry Grove Beach merged with Windy Hill Beach, Ocean Drive Beach, and Crescent Beach to form the city of North Myrtle Beach.

== Sister beaches ==
- North Myrtle Beach
- Crescent Beach
- Windy Hill Beach
- Ocean Drive Beach

== Major highways ==
- SC 9
- SC 65

== See also ==
- Crescent Beach
- Atlantic Beach
- Myrtle Beach
- North Myrtle Beach
