= WDAI =

Radio station in Pawleys Island–Myrtle Beach, South Carolina

- Pawleys Island, South Carolina; United States
- Broadcast area: Myrtle Beach, South Carolina
- Frequency: 98.5 MHz
- Branding: 98.5 Kiss FM

Programming
- Format: Mainstream urban
- Subchannels: HD2: Fox Sports Radio
- Affiliations: Premiere Networks; Westwood One

Ownership
- Owner: Cumulus Media; (Cumulus Licensing LLC)
- Sister stations: WAYS, WSEA, WSYN, WLFF

History
- First air date: October 1, 1993

Technical information
- Licensing authority: FCC
- Facility ID: 59490
- Class: C3
- ERP: 6,100 watts
- HAAT: 203 meters (666 ft)
- Transmitter coordinates: 33°35′27.00″N 79°2′55.00″W

Links
- Public license information: Public file; LMS
- Webcast: Listen live
- Website: 985kissfm.net

WDAI (98.5 FM, "98.5 Kiss FM") is a mainstream urban radio station licensed to Pawleys Island, South Carolina, and serves the Grand Strand area. The Cumulus Media outlet is licensed by the Federal Communications Commission (FCC) to broadcast with an effective radiated power (ERP) of 6,100 watts. Its studios are located on U.S. Highway 17 in Murrells Inlet, South Carolina, and its transmitter is located a mile west of the studios.

== History ==
WDAI signed on October 1, 1993, with an adult contemporary and sports talk format. It moved to an urban adult contemporary format as "98.5 Kiss FM", featuring the Tom Joyner Morning Show, in January 1995. By 1996, WDAI was the number one station in the market. WDAI dropped to third in fall 1998 but regained its position in spring 1999, losing the top spot to WJYR in Fall 1999. The drop in ratings came after a move toward more adult music, with 34-year-old women the target audience, after program director Ernie D. moved to WCMG and Chris Clay replaced him. More rap was added in the 2000s. WDAI leaned more adult after the 2009 debut of Power 100.3, a hip-hop music station also owned by Cumulus Media.

In January 2010, Cumulus Media hired a market veteran, Craig Russ, as its new Operations Manager. Personalities on the station included Monique, Michael Baisden, and Doug Davis.

In July 2010, WDAI changed from urban adult contemporary to mainstream urban, replacing a similar format Cumulus had aired on WSEA for a year before switching that station to CHR. WDAI also took the syndicated morning show from WSEA; Rickey Smiley, replacing Tom Joyner.

On January 9, 2020, it was announced that WDAI had added Premiere Networks' The Breakfast Club to mornings.
