= WNMB =

- North Myrtle Beach, South Carolina; United States
- Broadcast area: Grand Strand
- Frequency: 900 kHz
- Branding: El Gallo

Programming
- Format: Regional Mexican

Ownership
- Owner: Steven Lara; (Gorilla Broadcasting Company, LLC)

History
- First air date: April 1, 1983 (as WGSN)
- Former call signs: WGSN (1983–2000)
- Call sign meaning: "Wonderful North Myrtle Beach"

Technical information
- Licensing authority: FCC
- Facility ID: 49985
- Class: D
- Power: 250 watts day; 80 watts night
- Transmitter coordinates: 33°50′6.6″N 78°47′1.1″W
- Translators: 98.9 W255BZ (Myrtle Beach); 103.7 W279EH (North Myrtle Beach)

Links
- Public license information: Public file; LMS
- Webcast: Listen live
- Website: radioelgallo.com

WNMB (900 AM, "El Gallo") is a radio station licensed to North Myrtle Beach, South Carolina, United States, and serves the greater Myrtle Beach area. The station is licensed by the Federal Communications Commission (FCC) to broadcast at 900 kHz with a power of 250 watts during the day and 80 watts at night. The station previously went by the name "AM Stereo 900". The station most recently broadcast in high fidelity C-QUAM AM Stereo under a beach-oriented oldies format. Until August 1, 2015, WNMB was owned and operated by the family of Bill and Susi Norman who were original employees of the original WNMB (105.9 FM) when it signed on in 1972. WNMB FM existed from 1972 to 2000 when it was sold and changed its call sign to WEZV. Soon after, Bill Norman leased WGSN and changed its call sign to WNMB. Norman later purchased WNMB outright and continued the WNMB radio tradition on the Grand Strand. After several changes, the station broadcasts a Regional Mexican format.

== FM translators ==
In addition to the AM frequency of 900 AM, programming from WNMB is relayed to FM translators on 98.9 MHz, and 103.7 MHz. Another translator was on 102.3 FM.

Call sign	Frequency	City of license	FID	ERP (W)	Class	FCC info
W255BZ	98.9 FM	Myrtle Beach, South Carolina	147982	250	D	LMS
W279EH	103.7 FM	North Myrtle Beach, South Carolina	202622	250	D	LMS

== History ==
WGSN signed on with a news radio format in the early 1980s. Later, the station aired the same programming as co-owned WNMB, and at one point the station was an affiliate of EWTN Radio.

In 2000, Fidelity Broadcasting moved the callsign WNMB to WGSN when the FM became WEZV. At first, WNMB aired the same easy listening music as WEZV.

=== The Bill Norman years ===
Starting in 2001, WNMB was leased by Bill Norman, who managed WNMB FM in the 1970s and returned to the area after 20 years in Albemarle, North Carolina. Norman also became the morning host, while his wife Susi Norman, also a WNMB FM employee in the early days, took the midday shift. Larry Schropp, another member of the WNMB FM team, was the afternoon DJ.

On January 19, 2011, Ted Bell's "All Request Beach Cafe" lunch hour show moved to WNMB from WVCO. In late April 2011, WNMB owner Bill Norman resurrected WVCO. Ted Bell moved mainly back over to WVCO (where he had been previously for about 11 years). However, Bell could still be heard on WNMB as well. Both radio stations were located together in the WNMB building on Pine Avenue in North Myrtle Beach.

Owner Bill Norman suffered a serious stroke on September 29, 2012, and died at Grand Strand Regional Medical Center on October 14, 2012, from what initially was labelled a "cerebral vascular accident" on the death certificate. On October 19, 2012, the Myrtle Beach Police Department launched an investigation into Norman's death. WMBF-TV reported on December 6–7, 2012, that a 53-year-old nurse, Janet Kupka, had given Norman 20 milligrams of morphine instead of the prescribed 4 milligrams. Kupka allegedly admitted to a witness that she gave Norman the drug Diprivan. Norman was brain dead due to the stroke. Norman's body had been cremated and was not available to be autopsied. The cause of death may be changed to an overdose. In a filing with the FCC, Norman's widow was listed as his personal representative and owned 50% of WNMB in that capacity, in addition to the 50% stake she already held.

=== After Bill Norman ===
In 2014, WNMB changed from playing 1950s and 1960s music to playing music from the 1960s, 1970s, and 1980s. Previously, under Mr. Norman's tenure, the station had played a wide range of true golden oldies and had a considerable audience. Also, Mr. Norman was active in the community and had many advertising clients on his air. After the shift in music, the station's identity changed dramatically. The station did continue serving the community. The North Myrtle Beach High School "Coaches Show" aired Wednesdays and Thursdays during the evening.

On May 15, 2015, it was reported that an agreement had been reached to sell WNMB to Beatty Broadcasting Company for $25,000 with an option to buy the tower site for $150,000. The sale was consummated on August 1, 2015. WNMB was reported in the North Myrtle Beach Times as silent on November 12, 2015, with general manager Gary Beatty citing factors such as "FCC restrictions on the station's signal and the status of AM radio in general" as well as the death of former owner Bill Norman contributing to the decision. The station was listed as "licensed and silent" as of November 12, 2015, in the FCC's CDBS station search.

=== Sale to Colonial Radio Group ===
Effective June 21, 2016, Beatty Broadcasting sold WNMB's license to Colonial Radio Group, Inc. (Olean, New York-based Colonial Media and Entertainment) for $1,000. Colonial aimed to relaunch the station in fall 2016. On November 1, 2016, WNMB returned to the air with a gospel format. WNMB later changed formats to classic rock with translator W238CJ, branded first as "95.5 the Beach" and later as "95.5 The Drive". On December 11, 2018, WNMB went silent, but resumed operations on April 23, 2019. In May 2021, the "Carolina Country" format previously heard in the Myrtle Beach area on WMIR-FM moved to WNMB as Andrulonis sold WMIR-FM to another broadcaster. In February 2022, Colonial Radio Group sold WNMB to Gorilla Broadcasting Company for $400,000.

=== El Gallo ===
On June 6, 2022, coincident with the consummation of the sale to Gorilla Broadcasting, WNMB’s format was changed from country to Regional Mexican, branded as "El Gallo".
