= WWXM =

- Garden City, South Carolina; United States
- Broadcast area: Myrtle Beach, South Carolina
- Frequency: 97.7 MHz
- Branding: Mix 97.7

Programming
- Format: Top 40 (CHR)
- Affiliations: Premiere Networks; Westwood One

Ownership
- Owner: iHeartMedia, Inc.; (iHM Licenses, LLC)
- Sister stations: WGTR, WLQB, WRXZ, WYNA

History
- First air date: September 1971; 55 years ago
- Former call signs: WINH-FM (1971–1975); WGMB (1975–1985); WMXX (1985–1986); WGMB (1986–1989); WBPR (1989–1993)

Technical information
- Licensing authority: FCC
- Facility ID: 12181
- Class: C1
- ERP: 100,000 watts
- HAAT: 219 meters (719 ft)
- Transmitter coordinates: 33°35′45″N 79°3′11″W

Links
- Public license information: Public file; LMS
- Webcast: Listen live (via iHeartRadio)
- Website: mix977.iheart.com

WWXM (97.7 FM) is a top 40 (CHR) station licensed to Garden City, South Carolina and serves the Grand Strand area. The iHeartMedia, Inc. outlet is licensed by the Federal Communications Commission (FCC) to broadcast with an effective radiated power (ERP) of 100 kW. The station goes by the name Mix 97.7. Its studios are located on the U.S. 17 Bypass in Myrtle Beach, and its transmitter is in Murrells Inlet.

== History ==
The station was located in Georgetown, South Carolina for many years prior to a power increase from 3,000 to 50,000 watts. The station originally signed on the air as WINH-FM, a companion to WINH (AM) owned by the Winyah Bay Broadcasting Company in September 1971. In 1975 the station's call letters changed to WGMB and became known as "The New 98 Rock WGMB". Years later that slogan was changed into "98 Rock WGMB, We're The Rock Of The Bay!" as the marketplace adopted digital tuners. For a brief time in the mid-1980s, the station was AC with the new call letters WMXX, under the new moniker as "Magic 97.7", and the logo used on billboards resembled that of WMAG in High Point, North Carolina.

After the station improved its signal, it was known as WBPR and then again as WGMB under their new moniker as "The New Power 98 FM" and had a CHR with a rhythmic lean. Later the format moved in a more mainstream CHR direction, and on November 1, 1993, the change to then new current moniker as "The New Mix 97.7" and the current call letters as WWXM was made in the early 1990s and WWXM had a Hot AC format was used for several years. The signal was eventually improved to 100,000 watts and the city of license was moved to Garden City Beach.

Root Communications of Daytona Beach bought WWXM in a deal announced in June 1997 and moved it from Waccamaw Pottery to studios shared by WWSK and WGTR near the back gate of the former Myrtle Beach Air Force Base. As of 2000, Booger and Leanne Sullivan co-hosted the morning show. Qantum Communications Inc. purchased Myrtle Beach's Root Communications Group LP stations in 2003.

On May 15, 2014, Qantum Communications announced that it would sell its 29 stations, including WWXM, to Clear Channel Communications (now iHeartMedia), in a transaction connected to Clear Channel's sale of WALK AM-FM in Patchogue, New York to Connoisseur Media via Qantum. According to FCC records, the transaction was consummated on September 9, 2014.

In 2026, IHeartMedia began firing and removing certain radio hosts from radio stations, including Brodie from WWXM. This movement was to begin broadcasting nationally syndicated shows on radio stations instead of having local hosts. Brodie was replaced by EJ in July 2026 due to this movement.
