= WGTN (AM) =

- Georgetown, South Carolina; United States
- Frequency: 1400 kHz
- Branding: G107.5 The Pig

Programming
- Format: Southern rock/Outlaw country/Blues
- Affiliations: Fox News Radio

Ownership
- Owner: R.J. Stalvey; (Waccamaw Broadcasting, LLC)
- Sister stations: WPIF

History
- First air date: 1949
- Call sign meaning: Georgetown

Technical information
- Licensing authority: FCC
- Facility ID: 23899
- Class: C
- Power: 1,000 watts
- Transmitter coordinates: 33°24′15.6″N 79°19′35.19″W
- Translator: 107.5 W298CO (Georgetown)

Links
- Public license information: Public file; LMS
- Website: www.g1075fm.com

WGTN (1400 kHz) is an AM radiostation broadcasting a Southern rock/Outlaw country/Blues format, which is licensed to Georgetown, South Carolina, United States. The station was first licensed October 4, 1949. The station is owned by R.J. Stalvey. It previously featured programming from America's Radio News Network and Fox News Radio. It aired Fox Sports Radio on weekends.

== FM translator ==
The station programming is also heard on an FM translator, whose frequency is used in the branding of the format and logo.

Broadcast translator for WGTN
Call sign	Frequency	City of license	FID	ERP (W)	HAAT	Class	Transmitter coordinates	FCC info
W298CO	107.5 FM	Georgetown, South Carolina	200306	250	129 m (423 ft)	D	33°25′59″N 79°16′15″W	LMS

== History ==
The previous format was talk. On November 5, 2018, WGTN changed formats from talk to country, branded as "Coast Country 107.5". On January 14, 2019, WGTN again changed formats, this time from country to adult top 40, branded as "107.5 Hits FM". Three weeks later that format moved to WXJY. Later in 2019, WGTN began simulcasting on WXJY. On January 1, 2020, WGTN once more changed formats from country to comedy, branded as "The Comedy Station", and ended the simulcast.

In December 2020, WGTN changed to oldies/adult standards from the 1940s to 1960s. On July 29, 2021, WGTN changed to classic country, branded as "Countryfied 107.5".

Augusta Radio Fellowship Institute is buying WPGI from Todd Fowler's GT Radio, and WGTN and WPIF for $150,000 from Tim Thomas Radio, which bought the stations in 2025 for $350,000.

In November 2026, WGTN returned to the air with southern rock/outlaw country/blues, branded as "G107.5 The Pig".

== Previous logo ==
File:WGTN Countryfied 107.5 logo.png
