= WPGI =

- Georgetown, South Carolina; United States
- Broadcast area: Grand Strand
- Frequency: 93.7 MHz

Programming
- Format: Rock

Ownership
- Owner: Joseph Rice and Todd Fowler; (GT Radio, LLC)

History
- First air date: 1989 (as WTUB)
- Former call signs: WTUB (1989–1992); WSCA (1992–1997); WXJY (1997–2019); WYAY (2019–2020)

Technical information
- Licensing authority: FCC
- Facility ID: 69835
- Class: A
- ERP: 6,000 watts
- HAAT: 96 meters (315 ft)
- Transmitter coordinates: 33°16′05″N 79°17′49″W

Links
- Public license information: Public file; LMS

WPGI is a rock radio station licensed to Georgetown, South Carolina, and serving the Grand Strand area. The station is licensed by the Federal Communications Commission to broadcast at 93.7 MHz with an ERP of 6 kW.

== History ==
WSCA-FM signed on at 93.7 in Georgetown playing classic rock but later joined with WJXY-FM, changing its letters to WXJY. As WJXY's simulcast partner, WXJY was "Cruisin' Country", with a mix of country and rock music, then rhythmic as "Hot 93". Hot 93 changed to contemporary hit radio and added WSEA as a simulcast partner. Then WJXY-FM, WXJY and WIQB became ESPN Radio affiliates as "The Team" in 2003.

WXJY changed its simulcast partner to WSEA in July 2010, changing its format to contemporary hit radio.

WXJY once again simulcast WJXY. In 2013, the station aired a Southern rock/country music format called "The Outlaw".

On September 20, 2016, Cumulus' Joule Broadcasting announced that WJXY/WXJY would be sold to Colonial Radio Group for $240,000. That transaction was consummated on February 9, 2017, at which point WXJY changed simulcast partners from WJXY to WMIR and changed their format to urban gospel, branded as "Rejoice 93.7".

On February 5, 2019, two years after Colonial acquired the station, WXJY changed their format from urban gospel to adult top 40, branded as "93.7 Hits FM," and transferred operations of the station to Creative Coast Media through a LMA.

On July 4, 2019 at noon, WXJY changed to active rock as "93.7 the Shark".

In August 2019, WXJY began simulcasting WGTN (AM). The station then adopted the call sign WYAY.

On January 3, 2020, WYAY dropped the simulcast with WGTN and rebranded as "Carolina Country 93.7", simulcasting WMIR 93.9 FM Conway, an affiliate of the "Carolina Country" network.

The call sign was changed to WPGI on August 17, 2020. Two months later, Andrulonis announced the sale of the station to GT Radio, a company led by Joseph Rice and Todd Fowler. The sale, at a price of $275,000, was consummated on February 1, 2021.

WPGI simulcast oldies stations WGLD-FM and WYAY, which called themselves "Carolina Gold". The simulcast with WGLD-FM and WYAY ended on December 28, 2023, when WGLD-FM and WYAY changed their formats to classic alternative, branded as "The Coast".

WPGI later changed its format to rock.

Augusta Radio Fellowship Institute is buying WPGI from Todd Fowler's GT Radio for $125,000, and WGTN (AM) and WPIF from Tim Thomas Radio.
