= WPIF =

Radio station in Georgetown, South Carolina

- Georgetown, South Carolina; United States
- Broadcast area: Georgetown-Myrtle Beach
- Frequency: 1470 kHz
- Branding: 101.1 The Beach

Programming
- Format: Oldies/Beach music
- Affiliations: Fox News Radio

Ownership
- Owner: Waccamaw Broadcasting, LLC; (R.J. Stalvey)
- Sister stations: WGTN

History
- First air date: March 1962 (as WGOO)
- Former call signs: WGOO (1961–1967); WINH (1967–1985); WVBX (1985–1994); WLMC (1994–2022)
- Call sign meaning: Pawleys Island FM

Technical information
- Licensing authority: FCC
- Facility ID: 3900
- Class: D
- Power: 1,000 watts day 147 watts night
- Transmitter coordinates: 33°24′16″N 79°19′35″W
- Translator: 101.1 W266DG (Georgetown)

Links
- Public license information: Public file; LMS
- Website: www.101fmthebeach.com

WPIF (1470 AM) is a radio station broadcasting an oldies and Beach music format. Licensed to Georgetown, South Carolina, United States, the station serves the Myrtle Beach area and serves a particular focus towards the residents of Pawleys Island.

== History ==
WPIF originally signed on as WGOO in March 1962 by the Collins Corporation of Vidalia, Georgia with Frank K. Graham, President. Gordon Linscott was the original station manager with Charles Lohr and Vincent Hayes as other managers during the period 1962 to 1967. The station's programming was a variety of music. On May 1, 1967, WGOO was sold to Winyah Bay Broadcasting Company of Georgetown with A. I. Fogel as President. Harry R. "Tad" Fogel was station manager and the call letters were changed to WINH. WINH affiliated with the ABC Information Network on June 1, 1968, and in September 1971, WINH-FM (now WWXM) signed on. Both the AM & FM stations were sold in October 1984. Tad Fogel was inducted into the South Carolina Broadcaster's Association "Hall of Fame" in January 2010.

As of 1984, WINH played big band music.

After the 1984 sale, the WINH call letters were changed to WVBX on March 20, 1985. On April 15, 1994, the station changed its call sign to WLMC.

In August 2018, WLMC changed formats from gospel to oldies.

On January 9, 2022 the station rebranded as "The New 101.1 PI-FM", continuing their oldies format but focusing more on the listeners of Pawleys Island. The station changed its call sign to WPIF to match on January 24.

Augusta Radio Fellowship Institute is buying WPGI from Todd Fowler's GT Radio, and WGTN (AM) and WPIF for $150,000 from Tim Thomas Radio, which bought the stations for $350,000 in 2025.

In November 2026, WPIF returned to the air with oldies and beach music, branded as "101.1 The Beach".
