= WRXZ =

Mainstream rock radio station in South Carolina

- Briarcliffe Acres, South Carolina; United States
- Broadcast area: Myrtle Beach
- Frequency: 107.1 MHz
- Branding: Rock 107

Programming
- Format: Mainstream rock
- Affiliations: Compass Media Networks

Ownership
- Owner: iHeartMedia; (iHM Licenses, LLC)
- Sister stations: WGTR, WLQB, WWXM, WYNA

History
- First air date: 1971; 55 years ago
- Former call signs: WCIG-FM (1971–1995); WWSK (1995–2003); WQSD (2003–2009)

Technical information
- Licensing authority: FCC
- Facility ID: 66138
- Class: C2
- ERP: 50,000 watts
- HAAT: 150 meters (490 ft)
- Transmitter coordinates: 33°56′14.00″N 78°57′53.00″W

Links
- Public license information: Public file; LMS
- Webcast: Listen Live
- Website: rock107mb.iheart.com

WRXZ (107.1 FM) is a mainstream rock radio station licensed to Briarcliffe Acres, South Carolina and serves the Myrtle Beach area. The iHeartMedia outlet is licensed by the Federal Communications Commission (FCC) to broadcast with an ERP of 50 kW. The station goes by the name "Rock 107". Its studios are located on the U.S. 17 Bypass in Myrtle Beach, and its transmitter is located north of Conway, South Carolina.

== History ==
WCIG 107.1 was an urban adult contemporary and gospel station in Mullins, South Carolina prior to 1995. The station increased from 3,000 to 50,000 watts and moved to Myrtle Beach with the new name WWSK "107.1 The Shark" and the format "Mega Hits" (actually hot adult contemporary). John Boy and Billy were on in the morning from 1995 to December 18, 1998. Losing John Boy and Billy resulted in the station's losing half its audience, and nearly two-thirds of its morning audience.

The Shark's music changed several times. First it switched to modern rock in November 1996. Then it became "107.1 The Fox", playing rock oldies. In 2000 "The Fox" played "Classic Rock That Really Rocks", with artists such as The Rolling Stones, Pink Floyd and Janis Joplin. Also, Lex and Terry replaced John Boy and Billy in the morning; Mixin' Dixon had a midday show that included "Liquid Lunch", former morning host Michael Parnell did afternoons, and Leanne had the night shift. Lex and Terry were later replaced by Bob and Tom.

In a deal announced in February 1997, Root Communications Ltd. announced plans to buy eight radio stations owned by Florence, South Carolina-based Atlantic Broadcasting, including WWSK. Qantum Communications Inc. purchased Myrtle Beach's Root Communications Group LP stations in 2003.

On September 18, 2003 The Fox became The Sound, with the first song "Magical Mystery Tour" by The Beatles. For several years prior to 2007, WQSD The Sound was a classic hits station which told listeners, "It's all about the music". Then the station switched to Variety Hits, with the slogan "We play it all" and "The Grand Strand's Largest Music Library".

On February 18, 2008 WQSD flipped to urban adult contemporary. Earlier in the month, Qantum announced the purchase of variety hits WYNA "104.9 BOB-FM", which did much better in the ratings then 107.1 The Sound had. The station went by the name "Q107.1" and its slogan was "Today's R&B and Old School." Q107.1 aired "The Steve Harvey Morning Show", "The Ride with Doug and DeDe" afternoons and "Keith Sweat Hotel" for nights.

On March 3, 2009 107.1 FM dropped the urban adult contemporary format at 10:00 a.m. and switched to a mainstream rock format as "Rock 107". The call sign was changed to WRXZ with the format change. Also Mad Max did mornings; he was last seen on NextMedia's WKZQ.

On May 15, 2014 Qantum Communications announced that it would sell its 29 stations, including WRXZ, to Clear Channel Communications (now iHeartMedia), in a transaction connected to Clear Channel's sale of WALK AM-FM in Patchogue, New York to Connoisseur Media via Qantum. The transaction was consummated on September 9, 2014.
