= WYAY (FM) =

Simulcasting WMIR Atlantic Beach, South Carolina

Bolivia, North Carolina; United States
- Broadcast area: Wilmington, North Carolina
- Frequency: 106.3 MHz
- Branding: Rejoice

Programming
- Format: Urban gospel

Ownership
- Owner: Andrulonis Media; (Sweet Tea Radio, LLC)
- Sister stations: WGLD-FM

History
- First air date: 1986 (as WPGO)
- Former call signs: WAEM (8/1983–11/1983); WPGO (1983–1990); WCCA (1990–2003); WLTT (2003–2013); WUDE (2013–2020); WPGI (2020)

Technical information
- Licensing authority: FCC
- Facility ID: 60882
- Class: A
- ERP: 6,000 watts
- HAAT: 93 meters
- Transmitter coordinates: 34°2′50″N 78°16′12″W

Links
- Public license information: Public file; LMS
- Webcast: Listen Live
- Website: mbrejoice.com

WYAY (106.3 MHz, "Rejoice") is an FM radio station broadcasting an urban gospel format. Licensed to Bolivia, North Carolina, United States, WYAY serves the Wilmington area. The station is currently owned by Steve Clendenin, through licensee Maryland Media One, LLC.

== History ==
The 106.3 frequency was WCCA, a beach music station and then a classic country station. before taking over the call letters and talk format previously heard on what is now 103.7 WILT when Sea-Comm Media purchased the station. With the callsign WLTT, 106.3 became a news/talk station called "The Big Talker" and in 2004, WWTB, an adult standards station at 103.9 FM which was licensed to Topsail Beach, North Carolina, began airing the same programming. Sea-Comm general manager Paul Knight called the format a "not-politically-correct talk station." This simulcast ended when the WBNE 93.7 frequency took the role, moving to Topsail Beach and changing its callsign to WNTB.

WLTT changed its license city in 2009 from Shallotte to Bolivia. WLTT and WNTB simulcast The Big Talker to 5 counties in southeastern North Carolina.

Curtis Wright hosted "The Morning Beat" for four years ending in March 2010. He was replaced by Robby Kendall, who left May 6. Having come from a Whiteville station, Kendall had insufficient knowledge of Wilmington's history and politics, and he disliked the early hours. Neither general manager Paul Knight nor Wright wanted Wright's return. Kendall's co-host Chad Adams took over the show.

With the "retirement" of Chad Adams on March 29, 2013, the station identification was changed from "The Big Talker FM" to "Port City Radio". On April 1, 2013, the format was changed to local news from 6:00 AM to 6:00 PM. The stated reason for the move was to transform the station into a source of "unbiased news and information" in keeping with the company's larger goals.

After stunting with a ticking clock, on December 2, 2013, WLTT and WNTB changed their format to country, branded as "The Dude". On December 10, 2013, WLTT changed their call letters to WUDE, to go with the "Dude" branding.

In September 2019, WUDE was spun off to Andrulonis Media. WNTB is not included in the sale agreement. In January 2020 WUDE split from its simulcast with WNTB and flipped to a simulcast of WMIR, WFAY and WYAY, joining Andrulonis's "Carolina Country" network. The WYAY call letters moved from the Georgetown, South Carolina, transmitter to this station in August 2020.

On May 17, 2021, a month after Andrulonis sold the station to Maryland Media One, WYAY changed their format from country to oldies, branded as "Carolina Gold", simulcasting WMIR-FM 93.9 Conway, South Carolina. The sale was consummated on June 23, 2021, at a price of $400,000.

On December 28, 2023, WGLD-FM and WYAY split from the simulcast with WPGI and stunted with classic alternative, branded as "The Coast", before returning to Carolina Country as the stations returned to Andrulonis Media.

WYAY now simulcasts WMIR (AM) at 1200, licensed to Atlantic Beach, South Carolina.
