= WYEZ =

Soft adult contemporary radio station in Andrews, South Carolina

Simulcasting WEZV North Myrtle Beach
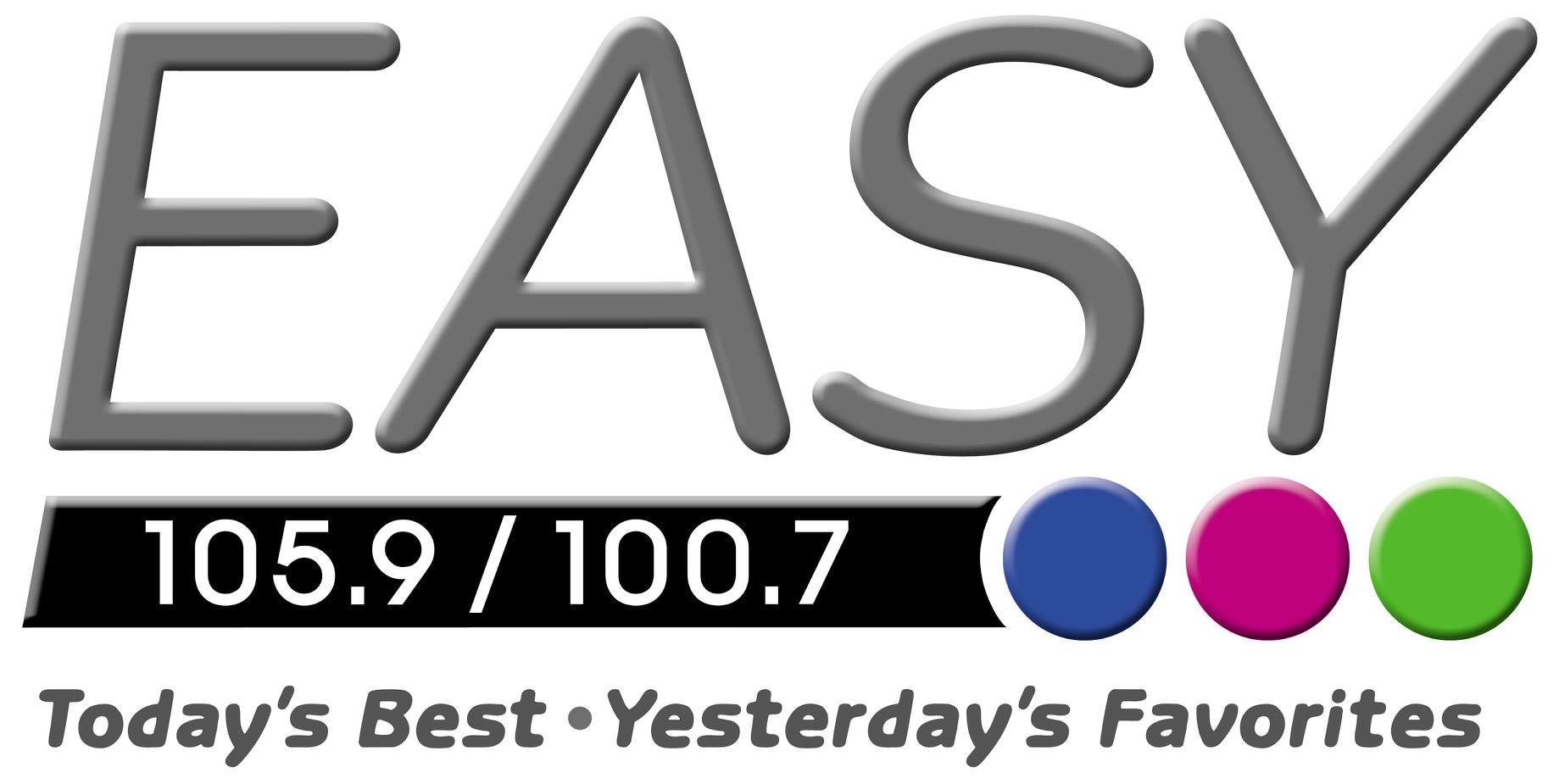
- Andrews, South Carolina; United States
- Broadcast area: Myrtle Beach, South Carolina
- Frequency: 100.7 MHz
- Branding: Easy 105.9 & 100.7

Programming
- Format: Soft adult contemporary

Ownership
- Owner: John and Blake Byrne; (Byrne Acquisition Group MB, LLC)
- Sister stations: WEZV; WTKN

History
- First air date: April 12, 1984 (as WQSC)
- Former call signs: WQSC (1984–1990); WGTN-FM (1990–2019)

Technical information
- Licensing authority: FCC
- Facility ID: 23898
- Class: A
- ERP: 3,100 watts
- HAAT: 136 meters (446 ft)
- Transmitter coordinates: 33°24′3.6″N 79°27′29.2″W

Links
- Public license information: Public file; LMS
- Webcast: Listen live
- Website: www.wezv.com

WYEZ (100.7 FM) is a radio station broadcasting a soft adult contemporary format, simulcasting WEZV (105.9 FM). It is licensed to Andrews, South Carolina, United States. The station is owned by John and Blake Byrne, through licensee Byrne Acquisition Group MB, LLC. Its studios are located in Myrtle Beach, South Carolina, and its transmitter is located east of Andrews.

== History ==
The station went on the air as WQSC on April 12, 1984. On March 30, 1990, the station changed its call sign to WGTN-FM. At that time, the format was adult contemporary.

Prior to 2008, this station aired the programming of WYNA, which was classic hits "Cool 104.9" and later Bob FM, "We play anything." It now simulcasts WEZV. On May 2, 2019, WGTN-FM changed its call letters to WYEZ.
