= WFAY =

- Fayetteville, North Carolina; United States
- Broadcast area: Fayetteville, North Carolina
- Frequency: 1230 kHz
- Branding: WFAY 100.1

Programming
- Format: Country

Ownership
- Owner: Jeffrey M. Andrulonis; (Colonial Media and Entertainment, LLC)
- Sister stations: WMIR, WMRV

History
- First air date: 1947 (as WFAI)
- Former call signs: WFAI (1947–2000)
- Call sign meaning: W FAYetteville

Technical information
- Licensing authority: FCC
- Facility ID: 72055
- Class: C
- Power: 1,000 watts
- Transmitter coordinates: 35°4′17.6″N 78°52′26.1″W
- Translator: 100.1 W261CX (Fayetteville)

Links
- Public license information: Public file; LMS
- Webcast: Listen Live
- Website: www.andrulonis.com/wfay

WFAY (1230 AM) is a radio station licensed to serve Fayetteville, North Carolina, United States. The station is owned by Jeffrey Andrulonis' Andrulonis Media. WFAY serves the Fayetteville area.

WFAY is the flagship station of the Carolina Country network, a country music network covering portions of North and South Carolina, and having been in Andrulonis's hands on and off since 1995, it is the flagship of the entire Andrulonis Media portfolio.

== History ==
WFAI signed on the air in 1947.

At one time, WFAI was a CBS Radio affiliate carrying Arthur Godfrey, Art Linkletter and Ma Perkins.

Jack Lee bought WFAI in 1960, and his "Open Mike" may have been the first talk show in Fayetteville. Danny Highsmith hosted "Talk Back" in the 1970s. "Talk Back" aired from 10–11 a.m. Monday to Friday. Lee had worked with Joy Pyne in Delaware, and her show was on WFAI at one time. Curt Nunnery hosted "Curt's Coffee Club" from 1960 to 1991, later moving the show to WFLB.

WFAI was owned by Beasley Broadcasting in late 1970s and early 1980s. In the 1970s, WFAI carried ABC Radio News from the American Entertainment Radio Network. The radio station slogan as a country station was "Fayetteville's Friend WFAI." Other slogans used were "WFAI Plays Favorites" coming out of ABC news at the bottom of the hour and the Station ID was "A Proud Part of the Beasley Broadcast Group, WFAI Fayetteville, North Carolina". The line up on WFAI in the mid- to late-1970s was Rudy Hickman 6-10A.M., Smoky King 10A.M.-2P.M., Terry Jordan 2-6P.M., and Scott Matthews 6P.M. to midnight. Also on the air was Ted Harris, who had come from WFNC; Mike Edwards, who had come from WHPY Clayton; and overnights Midnight-6 was Mike Huffman. Bob Brandon, who was in high school, went under the name Bob Clark at that time, and worked weekends. He went on to WFNC Fayetteville, and later, WSOC-FM in Charlotte. Bob Lee Chilcote handled Sunday mornings. Such programs as Fort Bragg Public Affairs, FCCYC, and Country Crossroads aired. Using the name "Bob Lee" and his show was "Turn Your Radio On" from 9–10:30 a.m., Bob played southern gospel music and used the Ray Stevens' song "Turn your Radio On" as the theme. Woody Gosnell usually handled the Sunday afternoons from Noon–6. One of the Sunday standards was Terry Jordan's "At the Console" in which he played organ music both church-oriented and classical, recorded at various churches in the Fayetteville area. "At the Console" aired from 10:30–11 a.m. From 11–noon a church service aired live. In the area of local news, the standard bearer was Johnnie Joyce, having come over from WFBS Spring Lake, whose newscasts aired from 5:30 to 9:30 a.m. each day Monday to Friday and also in the afternoons, with updates as needed. Sue Morrison, a graduate of the Radio TV program at CCTI, now CCCC in Sanford, provided those news updates in the late 1970s. In the 1970s WFAI also carried Winston Cup NASCAR races, now known as Sprint Nextel racing, which at that time was provided by MRN the Motoring Racing Network.

In 1980, WFAI became a Mutual Broadcasting System affiliate of the Larry King Show, which aired from midnight to 5 a.m. WFAI management cancelled the show after numerous complaints from its country listening audience. As a country station, WFAI was a reporting station for Billboard magazine and had been awarded numerous platinum and gold records for its contribution to country music. In summer of 1981, WFAI hosted a free country concert. The top act was Ronnie McDowell. The opening act was Alabama. In the early 1980s the on-air staff included Tim Williams, Mike Kirchen, Mike Hankey. Keith Cramer [Keith Eckhardt], worked overnights until he graduated from Westover Sr. High.

On March 1, 1991, WFAI changed from music of the big band era to traditional gospel music targeting African-American listeners. Station owners Henry Hoot and Rev. Gardner Altman also owned WFLB, which played more contemporary gospel music. WFAI would play Shirley Caesar, Willie Neal Johnson and The Gospel Keynotes, and the Rev. James Cleveland, while WFLB would play The Kingsmen, Chuck Wagon Gang and The Bishops. Station manager Rosa "Lady Gospel" Freeman said the station's announcers would be Don Reid, Bob Gay, Omega Sutton, Danny Davis and Dwayne Collins, and that WFAI would also have area ministers.

Jeff Andrulonis and Colonial Radio Group bought WFAI from Altman in 1995 and changed it to news/talk. At the time, it had Spanish language broadcasts at night. The station began airing Michael Reagan and Oliver North, "Fayetteville's Morning News," and sports broadcasts including the Carolina Panthers, North Carolina State, and college and professional basketball playoff games. After a year, "The Fort" made changes to de-emphasize "political" talk. Gary Burbank was added and Reagan and Pete Rose were dropped. WFAI later added The Fabulous Sports Babe and G. Gordon Liddy.

Madeleine Raymond hosted a controversial, often sexually oriented talk show from 1997 to 1999, with a target audience that included men on the nearby military bases.

WFAI became WFAY and dropped the "Fort" name in 2000 as part of an image change, though the station kept its talk format.

In 2001, WFAY added a full-time sports talk station, WCIE. Allen Smothers, news director for WFAY and WCIE, started Fayetteville's first local sports talk show in June 2001.

WFAY changed to mostly ESPN Radio in 2002 with drive-time sports talker Ryan Kilbane taking over as Operations Director. WFAY also carried Shaw University football games in 2004 through the Shaw Bear Sports Radio Network as Shaw won the CIAA Championship and Pioneer Bowl that year.

In January 2006, Norsan Consulting and Management applied to buy WFAY from Colonial Radio group, and began Spanish language broadcasts, as Andrulonis began an ultimately unsuccessful attempt to corner the radio market in the Twin Tiers of New York and Pennsylvania.

On April 17, 2008 WFAY returned to a Sports radio format, broadcasting the ESPN Radio Network and some local programming. WFBX ESPN 1450 Spring Lake airs the same programming. The two stations operated under a management agreement between DR Media LLC and C.R.S. Radio Holdings.

On February 22, 2016, as it became clear that Andrulonis's Twin Tiers efforts had failed to make a significant impact (much less corner the market) against the established and stronger-signaled competition there, he announced he was buying back WFAY and WFBX as the company returned its focus to the Carolinas. He also announced that, as many other AM radio stations were doing at the time, both stations would be getting FM translators to boost their coverage. Colonial resumed operating the stations under a local marketing agreement March 1.

In addition to ESPN Radio programming, WFAY broadcasts ECU football and basketball. Jeff Andrulonis announced on October 4, 2016 that the station would not broadcast the game between the Pirates and the South Florida Bulls the following Saturday. This was in response to a protest made by members of the school's marching band prior to the UCF game the previous Saturday to address racial justice and police brutality.

On October 8, 2016 WFAY went silent. On November 22, 2016, WFAY returned to the air with ESPN sports, branded as "ESPN Fayetteville". The purchase by Colonial Media and Entertainment, at a price of $771,641, was consummated on December 1, 2016.

Previous logo
