= WMIR (AM) =

- Atlantic Beach, South Carolina; United States
- Broadcast area: Myrtle Beach
- Frequency: 1200 kHz
- Branding: Rejoice 103.7 & 95.5

Programming
- Format: Urban contemporary gospel

Ownership
- Owner: Jeffrey Andrulonis; (Colonial Media and Entertainment, LLC)
- Sister stations: WFAY, WMRV

History
- First air date: October 1, 1997 (as WMIR)
- Former call signs: WMIW (1987–1997, CP); WMIR (1997–2017); WJXY (2017–2021)
- Call sign meaning: W MI(y)Rtle Beach

Technical information
- Licensing authority: FCC
- Facility ID: 41499
- Class: D
- Power: 6,500 watts day 11 watts night
- Transmitter coordinates: 33°50′12″N 78°47′3″W
- Translators: 95.5 W238CJ (Atlantic Beach); 103.7 W279EI (Conway)
- Repeater: 106.3 WYAY (Bolivia, North Carolina)

Links
- Public license information: Public file; LMS
- Webcast: Listen Live
- Website: mrbrejoice.com

WMIR (1200 kHz) is an urban contemporary gospel AM radio station licensed to Atlantic Beach, South Carolina, and targeting a primarily African-American audience.

== History ==
WMIR signed on in the late 1990s with a southern gospel format. After several years, the station changed its musical emphasis, with positive results.

Reggie Dyson, general manager of WMIR, said his station played a role in the 2002 BeachFest and planned live broadcasts from the June 2008 Beachfest, the third event of its type in the area.

On February 10, 2017, WMIR began a simulcast on WXJY "Rejoice FM" in Georgetown. On June 23, 2017, WMIR changed callsigns to WJXY. The WXJY simulcast ended in February 2019. The call sign reverted to WMIR on March 23, 2021.

Former logo

WMIR added F.M. translator W238CJ on 95.5 MHz.

WMIR is also heard on WYAY (FM) at 106.3, licensed to Bolivia, North Carolina.
