= WEZV =

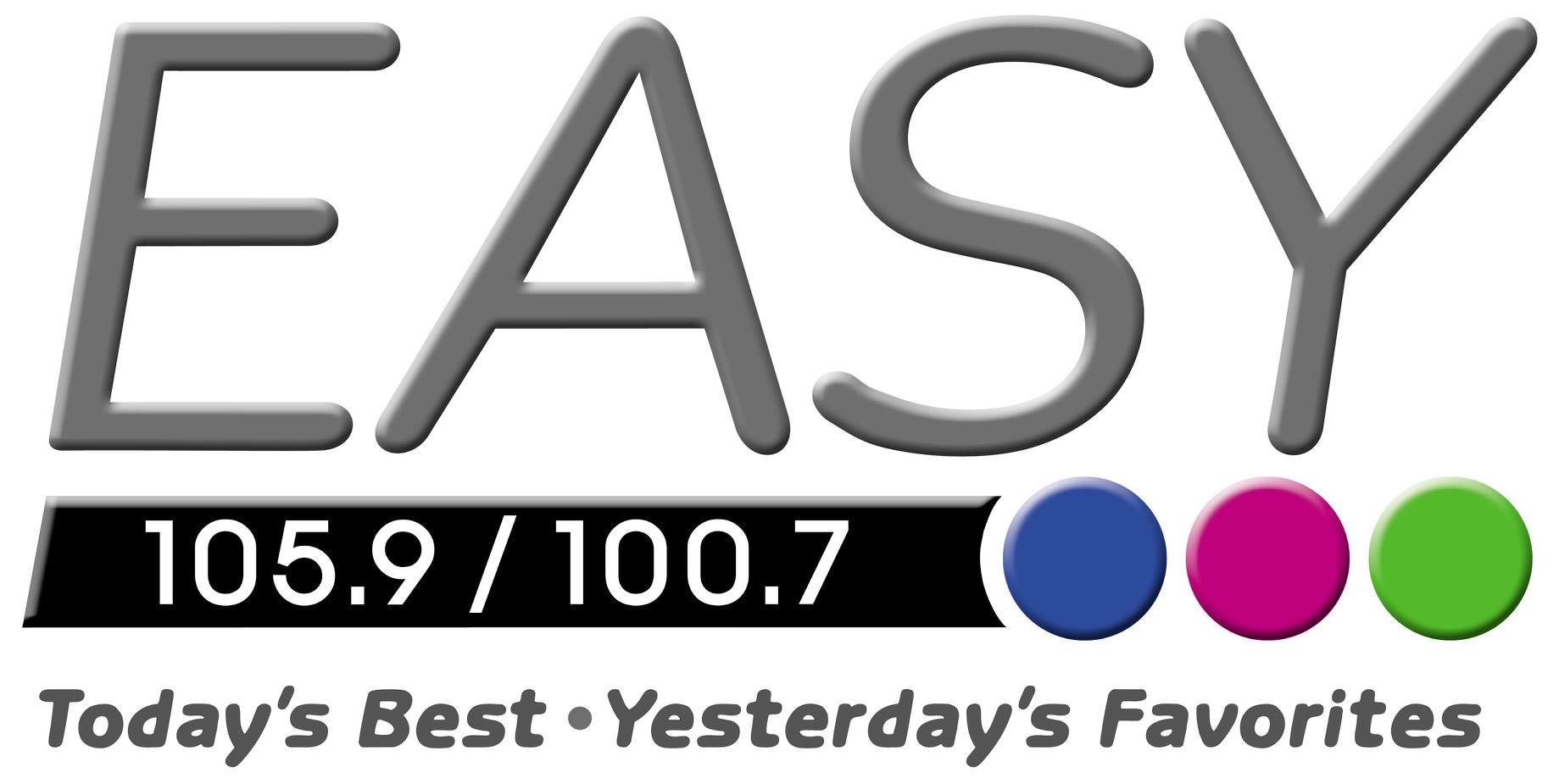
- North Myrtle Beach, South Carolina; United States
- Broadcast area: Grand Strand
- Frequency: 105.9 MHz
- Branding: Easy 105.9 & 100.7

Programming
- Format: Soft adult contemporary

Ownership
- Owner: John and Blake Byrne; (Byrne Acquisition Group MB, LLC)
- Sister stations: WYEZ; WTKN

History
- First air date: August 15, 1972 (as WNMB)
- Former call signs: WNMB (1972–2000)

Technical information
- Licensing authority: FCC
- Facility ID: 49986
- Class: C3
- ERP: 17,000 watts
- HAAT: 110 meters (360 ft)
- Transmitter coordinates: 33°51′16.6″N 78°42′59″W
- Repeater: 100.7 WYEZ (Andrews)

Links
- Public license information: Public file; LMS
- Webcast: Listen live
- Website: www.wezv.com

WEZV (105.9 FM) is a radio station broadcasting a soft adult contemporary format. Licensed to North Myrtle Beach, South Carolina, United States, the station serves the Myrtle Beach and Wilmington areas. The station is owned by Byrne Acquisition Group MB, LLC and is branded as Easy 105.9. Its studios are located in Myrtle Beach, and its transmitter is located north of North Myrtle Beach.

== History ==
WNMB signed on on August 15, 1972, in North Myrtle Beach, South Carolina. For much of its history the station played an adult contemporary and oldies mix. Air-personalities in the late 1970s and early 1980s included Program Director Bill Norman, Billy Smith, Dick Biondi, Bill Campbell, Don Holmes, Jay Charland, and Calvin Hicks. Calvin Hicks and Billy Smith were DJs in 1985.

In 1997, after listening to a consultant in Cleveland, WNMB switched from adult contemporary to hot adult contemporary, with a sound more like modern rock or adult alternative than fans were used to. Bob and Sheri were also added in the morning. Vice president of operations and midday host Phil Thompson said people thought they were hearing WSFM in nearby Wilmington and ratings dropped. By 1999 WNMB returned to mainstream adult contemporary with such artists as Dan Hartman, Bill Medley, Jennifer Warnes, Kenny Loggins, Elton John, Rod Stewart, Celine Dion, Backstreet Boys, Eric Clapton and Sarah McLachlan, but not Kenny G. Artists such as Alanis Morissette, Citizen King, Collective Soul, Pearl Jam, Lit, Train, and Len were out, though Bob and Sheri remained.

B-105.9 once had a bee as its symbol. Former B105/B105.9 employees include but are not limited to: Mitch Adams, Kelly Broderick, Steve McClung, Barry Ballard, Phil Thompson, Dave Dobson, Steve Chapman and Tyler Watkins. Scott Richards continues to work at the station.

At one time the studios were located on Pine Avenue (sometimes called Pine Street) in North Myrtle Beach, but new owners moved to Wesley Drive in Myrtle Beach and WNMB (900 AM), a simulcast partner during part of its history, took the old studios after it went out on its own.

With ratings down and the other easy listening stations having changed format in 2000, WNMB changed to its current call letters and the easy listening format, dropping Bob and Sheri. The 94.5 WYEZ frequency was added later in the year. Over the next few years, the two stations evolved, reducing the number of instrumentals until eventually the stations' format crossed the line to what most radio stations would call adult standards. WYEZ dropped its simulcast in July 2007. In 2008, WEZV began simulcasting on WGTN-FM.

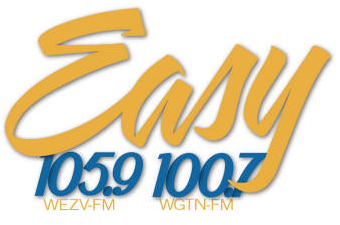
Logo from 2000 to 2017

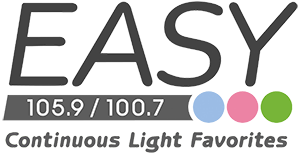
Logo from 2017 to 2020

In 2000, the on air line up of the Jim Morgan Morning Show, Kelli Dixon mid days, Scott Richards afternoons and Bob Natale weekends started, staying the same for several years. Dixon left the mid day program and Bob Collins took over. The Bob and Jan Natale weekend show began in 2012.

As of 2014, Diane DeVaughn Stokes had hosted "Diane at Six" weekdays from 6 to 7 PM for nearly five years. After another station dropped him, John Tesh returned to Grand Strand radio on WEZV and WGTN-FM during the evening, a time when the stations had never had a person on the air. Tesh moved to WYEZ late in 2016. Stokes became midday host.

WEZV/WGTN-FM changed from "Your Relaxation Station" to "Refreshing Favorites" including Billy Joel, Elton John and The Eagles, rather than Frank Sinatra and Dean Martin, in August 2017. The reason given for the change was a drop of 65 percent in the number of listeners. This also meant the departure of Jim Morgan and midday host Bob Collins as well as the end of the Bob and Jan Natale Show. Delilah began airing September 18.

In 2020, WEZV and WYEZ (the former WGTN-FM) changed to adult contemporary with "Today's best, yesterday's favorites". Artists included Adele, Justin Bieber, Kelly Clarkson, Lady Gaga, Madonna, Maroon 5, Bruno Mars, Matchbox Twenty, John Mayer, Shawn Mendes, P!nk, Ed Sheeran, Taylor Swift and Justin Timberlake.

By August 2021, WEZV/WYEZ had returned to soft adult contemporary with "Continuous Light Favorites".

== Other stations using the call letters ==
Another WEZV was previously owned by Holt Broadcasting, broadcasting over the Lehigh Valley in eastern Pennsylvania from 1973 to 1978 on 95.1 FM. Fairfield Broadcasting Company out of Kalamazoo, Michigan picked up the call sign in 1979. It was operated as an Easy Listening station in Fort Wayne, Indiana (101.7 FM) with its sister station of WEZR on the AM side. The call letters were dropped when the station changed formats around 1990. A year later, Bomar Broadcasting would assume the call letters and broadcast on 95.3 FM out of Lafayette, Indiana until 1998.
