= WLSQ (AM) =

Simulcasting WTKN Murrells Inlet
- Loris, South Carolina; United States
- Broadcast area: Myrtle Beach, South Carolina
- Frequency: 1240 kHz
- Branding: Talk 94.5 & 106.7

Programming
- Format: Conservative talk
- Affiliations: Fox News Radio; Premiere Networks; Salem Radio Network; Westwood One; Clemson Tigers; Motor Racing Network; Note Dame Fightin' Irish

Ownership
- Owner: Banana Jack Murphy Productions, LLC

History
- First air date: August 2, 1958; 67 years ago
- Former call signs: WLSC (1958–1984); WVSL (1984–1986); WLSC (1986–2023)
- Former frequencies: 1570 kHz (1958-1984)

Technical information
- Licensing authority: FCC
- Facility ID: 29541
- Class: C
- Power: 1,000 watts
- Transmitter coordinates: 34°2′5.00″N 78°52′58.00″W
- Translator: 106.7 W294CW (Loris)

Links
- Public license information: Public file; LMS
- Webcast: Listen Live
- Website: talkradiomb.com

WLSQ (1240 kHz, "Talk 94.5 & 106.7") is an AM radio station broadcasting a conservative talk format. WLSQ is licensed to serve the community of Loris, South Carolina, United States.The station is currently owned by Banana Jack Murphy Productions, LLC and features programing from Fox News Radio, Premiere Networks, Salem Radio Network, Westwood One, Clemson Tigers, Motor Racing Network, and Note Dame Fightin' Irish. In March 2012, the then-WLSC began broadcasting classic rock programming of QRockRadio, but switched to a talk format in November 2012. On September 11, 2023, the station switched to the QRockRadio format 24 hours a day and formally changed its call sign to WLSQ.

== History ==
WLSQ signed on on August 2, 1958, as WLSC on 1570 AM, moving to 1240 in 1984.

The station was assigned the call sign WVSL on April Fools' Day 1984. On New Year's Day 1986, the station changed its call sign to WLSC.

JARC Broadcasting owned WLSC from 1989 to 2007. The station played country music, bluegrass, and religious programming.

Banana Jack Murphy Productions LLC, a company formed by longtime Myrtle Beach radio personality, Banana Jack Murphy and his wife Barb Krumm, the marketing director for Ocean Lakes Family Campground in Myrtle Beach, South Carolina, purchased WLSC in the fall of 2007. Murphy built new studios in downtown Loris at the intersection of Main and Broad Street. The theatre style marquee sporting the station's call letters became an instant landmark.

WLSC aired country, bluegrass and religious programming until October 14, 2009, when the station switched to an oldies format and became known as Tiger Radio. (WTGR, a popular Myrtle Beach station was also known as Tiger Radio and broadcast at 1520 AM before changing to WKZQ.)

In 2011, WLSC added the afternoon program "The Beach Bob Oldies Show", which originates from WOLT. The Beach Bob Oldies Show would remain on WLSC until January 2012.

In April 2012, WLSC relocated to a new studio located in the Loris Chamber of Commerce building. The theatre style marquee was removed and its whereabouts are unknown.

During the spring and summer of 2012, WLSC broadcast Q Rock Radio, a personality driven music format featuring past on air talent heard on WKZQ during the '70s and '80s.

In August 2012, WLSC became the new broadcast station for the popular weekly syndicated talk show, Whispers Paranormal Radio, hosted by Jordan Cline. It is syndicated worldwide via the UFO Paranormal Radio Network.

WLSC changed to a talk format in November 2012. The station featured programming from the Genesis Communications Network.

On August 3, 2018, Murphy announced plans for an FM signal on 106.7 FM. WLSC Tiger Radio can also be heard online.

John Boy and Billy began airing April 1, 2020, on 1240 AM and TigerRadio.com. The station is using crowdfunding to finance the translator which signed on August 8, 2020.

On September 11, 2023, former WKZQ and KSTP (Minneapolis) radio personality and talk show host J. Patrick (Pat) Milan joined WLSQ hosting the mid-day slot. Banana Jack Murphy hosts The Number One Show afternoons.

On August 26, 2024, WLSQ changed their format from classic hits to a simulcast of talk-formatted WTKN 94.5 FM Murrells Inlet.
