= WGTR =

Radio station in Bucksport–Myrtle Beach, South Carolina

- Bucksport, South Carolina; United States
- Broadcast area: Myrtle Beach, South Carolina
- Frequency: 107.9 MHz
- Branding: Gator 107.9

Programming
- Format: Country
- Affiliations: Premiere Networks

Ownership
- Owner: iHeartMedia; (iHM Licenses, LLC)
- Sister stations: WLQB; WRXZ; WWXM; WYNA

History
- First air date: January 19, 1993
- Call sign meaning: "Gator"

Technical information
- Licensing authority: FCC
- Facility ID: 3118
- Class: C2
- ERP: 20,000 watts
- HAAT: 239 meters (784 ft)
- Transmitter coordinates: 33°35′45.6″N 79°3′10.1″W

Links
- Public license information: Public file; LMS
- Webcast: Listen live (via iHeartRadio)
- Website: gator1079.iheart.com

WGTR (107.9 FM) is a country music radio station owned by iHeartMedia. Licensed to Bucksport, South Carolina, it serves the Myrtle Beach area. The station is licensed by the Federal Communications Commission (FCC) to broadcast with an effective radiated power (ERP) of 20,000 watts. WGTR goes by the name The Gator and its current slogan is "#1 For New Country, Gator 107.9". Its studios are located on the U.S. 17 Bypass in Myrtle Beach, and its transmitter is in Murrells Inlet.

== History ==
The station went on the air as WGTR on January 19, 1993, with its country music format.

In a deal announced in February 1997, Root Communications Ltd. announced plans to buy eight radio stations owned by Florence, South Carolina-based Atlantic Broadcasting, including WGTR. Qantum Communications Inc. purchased Myrtle Beach's Root Communications Group LP stations in 2003.

In late 2013, two-time Country Music Association award winner Jeff Roper became morning host and program director. Adam Dellinger, the show producer, worked with Roper in Greensboro, North Carolina, and San Antonio, Texas. Roper left the station for KSAT-TV in San Antonio the next summer and was replaced in the morning by Zac Davis. The current iteration of the morning show includes Adam Dellinger, now program sirector, and Bri Prosser.

On May 15, 2014, Qantum Communications announced that it would sell its 29 stations, including WGTR, to Clear Channel Communications (now iHeartMedia), in a transaction connected to Clear Channel's sale of WALK AM-FM in Patchogue, New York, to Connoisseur Media via Qantum. According to FCC records, the transaction was consummated on September 9, 2014.

Gator 107.9 features a local morning show, as Florence/Dillon–based sister station WEGX Eagle 92.9 carries The Bobby Bones Show. Gator 107.9 is the host of the Carolina Country Music Fest. A yearly festival that normally takes place for three days in June in Myrtle Beach. The festival is held on the grounds of the former Myrtle Beach Pavilion.
