= WLQB =

Radio station in Ocean Isle Beach, North Carolina

- Ocean Isle Beach, North Carolina; United States
- Broadcast area: Myrtle Beach, South Carolina
- Frequency: 93.5 MHz
- Branding: El Patron 93.5

Programming
- Format: Regional Mexican

Ownership
- Owner: iHeartMedia, Inc.; (iHM Licenses, LLC)
- Sister stations: WGTR, WRXZ, WWXM, WYNA

History
- First air date: 1999 (as WDZD)
- Former call signs: WDZD (1997–2005); WLQB (2005–2019); WLLZ (2019); WDTW-FM (2019)
- Call sign meaning: La Que Buena (former branding)

Technical information
- Licensing authority: FCC
- Facility ID: 3122
- Class: A
- ERP: 6,000 watts
- HAAT: 100 meters (330 ft)
- Transmitter coordinates: 33°55′37″N 78°23′48″W

Links
- Public license information: Public file; LMS
- Webcast: Listen Live
- Website: elpatron935.iheart.com

WLQB (93.5 FM, "El Patron 93.5"; translation: The Boss, or Master) is a radio station broadcasting a regional Mexican format. Licensed to Ocean Isle Beach, North Carolina, United States, the station is owned by iHeartMedia, Inc., through licensee iHM Licenses, LLC. Its studios are located on the U.S. 17 Bypass in Myrtle Beach, and its transmitter is in Shallotte, North Carolina.

== History ==
The call letters WDZD were formerly used by WLTT (now WILT) when that station was at 93.5 FM.

In January 1999, "hyperactive rock" radio station "93.5 Asylum" signed on in Myrtle Beach, South Carolina. Darren Taylor, assistant program director and afternoon DJ, said that in addition to Metallica, Black Sabbath, Judas Priest and Iron Maiden, the station would play bands that received little radio airplay, such as Static-X, Rage Against the Machine, Godsmack, and Kid Rock. Other artists on WDZD included Rob Zombie, Collective Soul, Lenny Kravitz, Hole, The Black Crowes, silverchair, Korn, Marilyn Manson, Stone Temple Pilots, Soundgarden, Beastie Boys, Smashing Pumpkins, AC/DC, Nirvana, Pearl Jam, Creed, Faith No More, Placebo, The Offspring, and Jonny Lang. DJs who joined the station on February 8 were Freaky Chick, Art, Monkey Boy from WWSK, and Pork Chop of KUFO in Portland, Oregon. Booger of WWXM was music director. Scrap Jackson, operations manager for Root Communications in Myrtle Beach, said the target audience was males in their 20s, and "93-5 is truly an alternative station as Webster defined it."

Because the signal could not be heard throughout the Myrtle Beach market (though Wilmington listeners could hear it), the station did not perform well. WDZD was changed to Memories from ABC Radio Networks, a soft oldies satellite format, in 2000, and the name became "Lite 2000".

Several years later, WDZD began airing the country music heard on WGTR, but the stations went their separate ways in 2005. WDZD became "La Que Buena 93.5, La Estación De Las Estrellas", with a Regional Mexican format and the call sign WLQB.

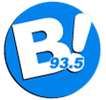
Former logo

In 2013, WLQB became adult contemporary B93.5, with "Ocean Isle and Calabash's Best of the '80s, '90s, and Today!"

On May 15, 2014, Qantum Communications announced that it would sell its 29 stations, including WLQB, to Clear Channel Communications (now iHeartMedia), in a transaction connected to Clear Channel's sale of WALK AM-FM in Patchogue, New York to Connoisseur Media via Qantum. The transaction was consummated on September 9, 2014.

On May 5, 2017, WLQB returned to Regional Mexican as "El Patron". On February 28, 2019, the station changed the call sign to WLLZ. One week later, the call letters were swapped with WDTW-FM in Detroit. That station had changed formats on March 1 to one that used "WLLZ" in its branding (WLLZ was a set of heritage calls in the Detroit market which iHeartMedia was able to reserve and claim in order to facilitate the format switch). On March 15, 2019, the call sign was changed back to WLQB.
