= WMRV (AM) =

Radio station in Spring Lake, North Carolina

- Spring Lake, North Carolina; United States
- Broadcast area: Fayetteville, North Carolina
- Frequency: 1450 kHz
- Branding: 106.5 The River

Programming
- Format: Classic rock

Ownership
- Owner: Jeffrey Andrulonis; (Colonial Media and Entertainment, LLC)
- Sister stations: WFAY, WMIR

History
- First air date: May 22, 1963 (as WFBS)
- Former call signs: WFBS (1963–1983); WRZK (1983–1987); WPJS (1987–1988); WCIE (1988–2008); WFBX (2008–2017)
- Call sign meaning: W M RiVer

Technical information
- Licensing authority: FCC
- Facility ID: 19875
- Class: C
- Power: 950 watts
- Transmitter coordinates: 35°11′0″N 78°57′45″W
- Translator: 106.5 W293DD (Fayetteville)

Links
- Public license information: Public file; LMS
- Webcast: Listen Live
- Website: WMRV Online

WMRV (1450 kHz) is a radio station licensed to Spring Lake, North Carolina, serving the Fayetteville area. The station is currently licensed to Jeffrey Andrulonis' Colonial Media and Entertainment.

== History ==
Norman Suttles, a former manager of WFNC, signed on WFBS on May 23, 1963, as the fifth radio station in Cumberland County, North Carolina. The format was Top 40, and announcers included some of the best in the country because the U.S. Army drafted them and sent them to Fort Bragg. Because it had the clearest signal of any station on the base, and because it sounded as professional as a large-market station, WFBS became a major success.

From 1963 to the mid-1970s, the station was owned by Radio Smiles, a group owner of several AM radio stations in North Carolina, including stations in Kinston (WISP), Graham WSML, Raleigh (WRNC) and others.

The station's original studios and offices were located on the second floor of the Professional Building in downtown Spring Lake. The tower/transmitter site was a former cow pasture on NC Highway 210, one mile north of Spring Lake. .

Between 1966 and 1969, a fire originating in a dentist's office in the Professional Building destroyed the station's studios and offices. The station built the new WFBS Broadcast House studio and office building at the transmitter site and moved into it prior to 1969.

On February 8, 1969, a fire started underneath the control room of the Broadcast House studio building. The fire spread very quickly, fueled by the plastic insulation of cables installed on the underside of the floor, as well as gasoline and a gasoline powered lawnmower stored nearby. The burning plastic rapidly filled the building with dense smoke.

Station personnel tried to save what they could, but the toxic smoke forced them to leave the building with almost nothing. The fire spread from the basement through the studios to the attic. It heavily damaging the back half of the building, collapsed parts of the floor and ceiling, and destroyed the control room, news studio, racks of equipment, and both production rooms. The offices were undamaged by fire, but received substantial smoke damage.

The station resumed broadcasting from a temporary studio in the transmitter building. The station offices were moved to a residential style mobile home temporarily located near the studio building while the building was repaired. Conditions were cramped. The bathtub of the mobile home was used as a makeshift filing cabinet.

In the mid-1970s the station was purchased by Jerry Oakley, its long-time general manager.

In 1979, the station was sold to William Britt, a North Carolina attorney.

In 1980, the station changed to a "soft soul" music format and was very successful for a short time For a period of time between 1980 and 1987, the station was programmed with the Z Rock hardcore metal rock music format, and operated with call letters WRZK.

On June 27, 1988, the station was transferred to Evangel Christian School, Inc. Evangel Christian School changed the call letters to WCIE to match their FM station in Lakeland, Florida, WCIE-FM (91.1). The letters stood for "Where Christ is Everything."

In September 1989 Evangel stopped providing WCIE with programming by satellite, so the station had to increase its original programming from five hours a week to all the time. WCIE was also non-commercial and did not even charge pastors for airing their messages; an annual "Share-a-Thon" provided the station with its funding.

For a period of time prior to October 1991, the station "went dark" and did not transmit.

On January 18, 1996, the station was sold to W & V Broadcasting.

For nine months prior to February 14, 1999, W & V Broadcasting, owned by William and Vera Hollingsworth, worked to return WCIE to the air. According to general manager Tammie Hollingsworth, WCIE had been off the air two years when it came back as a black gospel station airing the same programming as co-owned WMFA. The station made its return despite a break-in that resulted in the loss of thousands of dollars of equipment.

Late in 1998, WCIE went off the air again because the Highway 210 site was sold to a new owner who did not want the station's tower there. This required the transmitter/tower site to be moved about ¼ mile north to a new location.

Late in 1999, the station was sold to Jeffrey Andrulonis's Colonial Radio Group, Inc., owner of WFAI, and the planned format was "1450 The Sports Animal." In 2001, the plan was for sports talk began airing on both WCIE and WFAY, the station which had been WFAI. "ESPN Radio 1450" finally began broadcasting at full power January 1, 2002 after temporarily using 500 watts while various problems were solved. WFAI aired WCIE's programming at night. WCIE aired the area's only local sports-talk show, hosted by Allen Smothers.

Late in June 2002, WCIE became a Spanish language station, the first in the area, with the name "Mexicana Musical 1450 AM," and WFAY took over the sports talk format. The new WCIE format would include Spanish Contemporary, tropical music, banda, ranchera, tejano, salsa, and regional Mexican.

Early in 2004, Roberto Vengoechea became the new general manager, and "La Nueva Radio Latina" included an increased focus on Latin and Caribbean listeners, not just Mexicans. In addition to news and information, WCIE played tropical, salsa, merengue and cumbia music. One reason for the changes: the various ethnic groups on the area military bases.

On May 1, 2006, WCIE became "ESPN 1450." WFAY airs the same programming. The two stations operate under a management agreement between DR Media LLC and C.R.S. Radio Holdings.

In 2000, the original WFBS call letters were adopted by an AM radio station on 1280 kHz in Berwick, Pennsylvania. The Berwick station bought the rights to the original WFBS Radio Smiles jingles from the early 1960s and changed their identity to WFBS, Radio Smiles, with a format of early 1960s music. The station now holds the call sign WBWX.

Scott Shannon, New York radio programmer and DJ (also the announcer for the Sean Hannity radio show), started his radio career at this station.

On February 22, 2016, Colonial Radio Group announced they were repurchasing WFAY and WFBX. They also announced the stations would be getting FM translators to boost their coverage. Colonial resumed operating the stations under a local marketing agreement March 1.

On May 12, 2016, WFBX, adding a simulcast on 92.5 W250AQ Spring Lake, flipped to a sports/rock hybrid format as "92-5 FBX". The station will feature a mix of current and classic rock in morning drive, nights and weekends and syndicated sports talkers Dan Patrick, Jim Rome, and Colin Cowherd. WFBX also broadcast Army football starting with the 2016 season. The purchase by Colonial Radio Group, at a price of $771,641, was consummated on December 1, 2016.

On November 6, 2017, WFBX changed their call sign to WMRV. On November 9, 2017, WMRV changed their format from sports/rock to classic rock, re-branded as "106.5 The River", and the FM translator changed frequency from 92.5 FM to 106.5 FM and moved to Fayetteville (as W293DD).

In December 2020, the station began carrying the weekly syndicated Pink Floyd program "Floydian Slip."

=== Ownership history ===
- 1963 – mid-1970s: Smiles Radio, Inc (Norman Suttles)
- Mid 1970s: Triad Communications (Jerry Oakley)
- Mid 1970s – December 5, 1979: Crest Communications (Jerry Oakley)
- December 5, 1979 – June 22, 1983: Crest Communications (William Britt)
- June 22, 1983 – December 30, 1986: Crest Communications (Bobby Moore)
- December 30, 1986 – June 27, 1988: Smiles Radio Inc. (Norman Suttles)
- June 27, 1988 – January 18, 1996: Evangel Christian School, Inc.
- January 18, 1996 – November 24, 1999: W & V Broadcasting
- November 24, 1999 – April 19, 2001: Colonial Radio Group
- April 19, 2001 – present: WCIE-AM, Inc.

=== Call sign history ===
- WFBS: May 22, 1963 – November 1, 1983
- WRZK: November 1, 1983 – June 22, 1987
- WPJS: June 22, 1987 – August 9, 1988
- WCIE: August 9, 1988 – May 29, 2008
- WFBX: May 29, 2008 – November 9, 2017
- WMRV: November 9, 2017 – Present
