= WAYS (AM) =

Fox Sports Radio station in Conway–Myrtle Beach, South Carolina

- Conway, South Carolina; United States
- Broadcast area: Myrtle Beach, South Carolina
- Frequency: 1050 kHz

Programming
- Format: Country music

Ownership
- Owner: Cumulus Media; (Cumulus Licensing LLC)
- Sister stations: WDAI; WSYN; WLFF; WSEA

History
- First air date: February 23, 1977; 49 years ago (as WJAL)
- Former call signs: WJAL (1977); WJXY (1977–2000); WIQB (2000–2010); WHSC (2010–2017); WRWM (2017–2020)

Technical information
- Licensing authority: FCC
- Facility ID: 17484
- Class: B
- Power: 5,000 watts day; 473 watts night
- Transmitter coordinates: 33°50′56.6″N 79°5′2.1″W
- Translator: 101.9 W270BZ (Conway)

Links
- Public license information: Public file; LMS

WAYS (1050 kHz) is a radio station in Myrtle Beach, South Carolina. It is owned by Cumulus Media and it had previously aired a sports radio format, much of it from Fox Sports Radio. Its studios are on U.S. Highway 17 in Murrells Inlet, South Carolina, and its transmitter is located in the station's city of license, Conway, South Carolina. Programming had also been heard on FM translator W270BZ at 101.9 MHz in Conway.

== History ==
WAYS originally signed on February 23, 1977, as WJAL. That August, the call sign became WJXY, a call sign that stayed with the station for many years. WJXY was a daytime-only country music station in the 1970s. An FM sister station at 93.9 was added around 1990, at which time the AM switched to Southern gospel. In 1995, the format changed to adult standards, with most of the music coming from the AM Only satellite format. By this time, the station had a limited nighttime signal.

In Fall 1999, Hurricane Floyd damaged WJXY's studios and transmitter site and forced WJXY-FM, WXJY and WSEA to move to the WSYN/WDAI studios near Inlet Square Mall. At the time, WJXY aired Conway High School football; those games moved to WRNN-FM. WJXY was off the air for several months. Early in 2000, the station was back, but not in stereo. Many listeners had complained.

The station was assigned the WIQB call letters by the Federal Communications Commission on November 16, 2000. For a time, WIQB aired the same programming as oldies station WSYN.

On February 15, 2003, WIQB became part of "The Team" all sports format along with WJXY-FM.

On April 30, 2010, WIQB switched to southern gospel and changed its letters to WHSC.

On March 5, 2012, WHSC became the new Myrtle Beach affiliate of Fox Sports Radio. Dan Patrick would air live in the market rather than on tape, and Jim Rome would follow. WHSC became the new station for the Myrtle Beach Pelicans.

The station changed its call sign to WRWM on December 26, 2017, and to WAYS on February 13, 2020.

Cumulus applied for WAYS to be temporarily silent in March 2025. It was one of six Cumulus stations to close the weekend of March 7, as part of a larger shutdown of underperforming Cumulus stations.

During 2026, WAYS began simulcasting WLFF.

== Translator ==
Broadcast translator for WAYS
Call sign	Frequency	City of license	FID	ERP (W)	HAAT	Class	Transmitter coordinates	FCC info
W270BZ	101.9 FM	Conway, South Carolina	83075	250	98.5 m (323 ft)	D	33°51′13″N 79°1′14″W	LMS
