= Waccamaw Corp. =

Former American home furnishings retailer

Waccamaw Corp. was a home furnishings business that started in 1977 as Waccamaw Pottery, a Myrtle Beach, South Carolina based pottery company founded by George Bishop that sold pottery and crafts.

== Waccamaw Pottery ==
The original store on U.S. Route 501 at one point had 6 million shoppers and in 1983 was named "the state’s most outstanding commercial attraction."

Expansion beyond its original location, in Myrtle Beach, South Carolina, began in 1982, when the company opened a Burlington, North Carolina location. Next came Spartanburg, South Carolina in 1983, followed by Rolling Meadows, Illinois (outside Chicago) in 1984 and Dale City, Virginia (a Washington, D.C. suburb) in 1985.

It grew into the home furnishings business in the early 1990s and operated stores throughout the South and Midwest, selling housewares, bedding, cookware, china, and furniture.

In the face of heavy competition from direct competitors Bed Bath & Beyond, Linens 'n Things and Old Time Pottery; as well as discount stores like Walmart and Target, the company merged with the primarily Northeastern HomePlace and grew to over 100 stores by 2001. Waccamaw renamed its stores "Waccamaw's HomePlace", and were planning to phase out the Waccamaw name altogether when the company filed for bankruptcy. The company ceased operations in June 2001.

== Waccamaw Factory Shoppes ==
The original Waccamaw Pottery building in Myrtle Beach is still standing, part of the Waccamaw Factory Shoppes complex, once the nation's third-largest outlet shopping complex with more than 100 stores in 750,000 square feet of space on 80 acres. A fourth section was added in 1998 and a renovation of the entire complex was announced in October 2000. Competition from Myrtle Beach Factory Stores, however, was hurting the complex. Also, in December 2000, American International Life Insurance Co. foreclosed on owner Outlet Park RPFIV Associates LLC after a missed payment on a loan. A planned bridge over the Intracoastal Waterway was expected to help the area, along with turning a section of U.S. 501 into a freeway. Some believed the complex could make a comeback, with help. But additional competition was coming from Tanger Factory Outlets as well as a conventional mall nearby. In December 2001, American International Group (AIG) bought the property at auction. Talk of a theme park began, though some believed the mall could remain. In August 2003 Horry County Council voted to rezone land for the theme park, and by 2005 Hard Rock Park, a now-defunct music-themed amusement park, appeared likely to become a reality. But the mall had two stores, the upgrading of U.S. 501 had decreased interest in an area that became hard to reach, and AIG had its own problems. The bridge that was supposed to help the area had no funding, though work on extending Harrelson Boulevard past an interchange on U.S. 17 Bypass was set to begin. One of the Waccamaw facility's buildings was used seasonally as a rehearsal location for the Radio City Rockettes.

By 2008, a development called Paradise City was planned on part of the site by the developers of Hard Rock Park, which made Mall 3 its headquarters. The plans fell-through when the park shut down, and the property became neglected. A few businesses still operated in the shopping center, and some considered themselves successful.

On December 30, 2011, according to Horry County property records, 3W LLC bought 52 acres and 600,000 square feet from General Electric Credit Equities (a unit of General Electric) for $7.5 million (~$10.3 million in 2024). Alain Wizman of Keller Williams, which represented 3W in the transaction and would handle leasing, said $1 million would be spent on improvements and the complex would get a new name that included Waccamaw. Property manager Martin Durham said spaces on the outside would be filled first, followed by the interiors of the two malls. By the end of June 2012, one business had moved in.

Waccamaw Center, as it was later called, attracted a number of businesses of different types as well as a branch of NewSpring Church. One reason is the location on a major highway without the cost normally associated with this benefit. In October 2014, work was supposed to start on a half million dollars' worth of landscaping. Other improvements were planned, and it was predicted that 25 stores would be located in the mall.

As of July 2018, Waccamaw Center had 25 tenants, and 3W LLC stated their goal was to establish an Asian-oriented multicultural center. Cultural events had been held over the previous several years. In 2023, the complex included Asher Theatre and NewSpring Church.
