= Loris, South Carolina =

- City
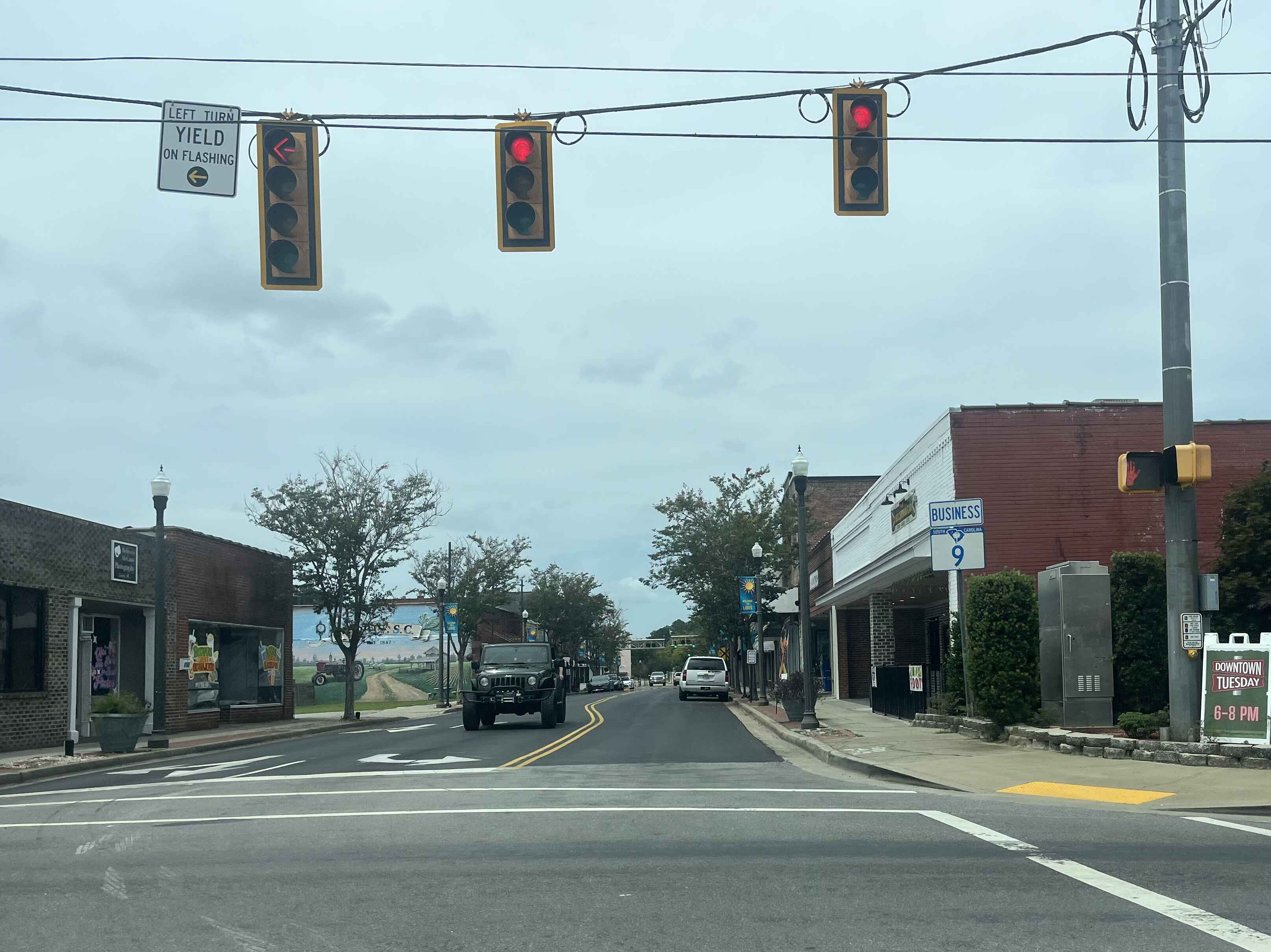

- Flag Seal

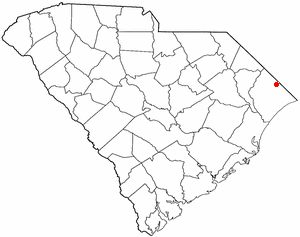
- Location of Loris in South Carolina
- Coordinates: 34°03′23″N 78°52′48″W
- Country: United States
- State: South Carolina
- County: Horry
- Incorporated (town): 1938
- Incorporated (city): 1957

Area
  - Total: 4.57 sq mi (11.84 km^{2})
  - Land: 4.55 sq mi (11.79 km^{2})
  - Water: 0.019 sq mi (0.05 km^{2})
- Elevation: 95 ft (29 m)

Population (2020)
  - Total: 2,449
  - Density: 538/sq mi (207.7/km^{2})
- Time zone: UTC-5 (EST)
  - Summer (DST): UTC-4 (EDT)
- ZIP code: 29569
- Area codes: 843, 854
- FIPS code: 45-42730
- GNIS feature ID: 2404958
- Website: www.cityoflorissc.com

Loris is a city in Horry County, South Carolina, United States. As of the 2020 census, Loris had a population of 2,449.

== History ==
Loris was founded on December 7, 1887, as a railroad town, originally serving the Wilmington, Chadbourn, and Conway Railroad. Loris was later incorporated on July 26, 1902. The first brick building, which housed the Bank of Loris, opened in 1907. Telephone lines to Conway were first used in 1909. The town grew steadily in the 1920s and 1930s; a high school opened in 1920, and by the 1930s, Loris had around 1,000 residents. In the 1970s, Loris legally became a city.

== Geography ==
Loris is in northern Horry County on the Atlantic coastal plain.

Highways include U.S. Route 701, and SC Highway 9 Business (Main Street).

According to the United States Census Bureau, the city of Loris has a total area of 4.6 square miles (11.8 km^{2}), of which 0.02 square miles (0.05 km^{2}), or 0.43%, are water.

== Demographics ==
Historical population
Census	Pop.	Note	%±
1910	229		—
1920	666		190.8%
1930	900		35.1%
1940	1,238		37.6%
1950	1,614		30.4%
1960	1,702		5.5%
1970	1,741		2.3%
1980	2,193		26.0%
1990	2,067		−5.7%
2000	2,079		0.6%
2010	2,396		15.2%
2020	2,449		2.2%
U.S. Decennial Census

=== 2020 census ===
As of the 2020 census, Loris had a population of 2,449, 656 families, and a median age of 47.4 years. 19.8% of residents were under the age of 18 and 25.1% were 65 years of age or older, and there were 78.8 males for every 100 females and 74.8 males for every 100 females age 18 and over.

0.0% of residents lived in urban areas, while 100.0% lived in rural areas.

There were 1,040 households in Loris, of which 28.0% had children under the age of 18 living in them. Of all households, 33.7% were married-couple households, 17.7% were households with a male householder and no spouse or partner present, and 44.5% were households with a female householder and no spouse or partner present. About 33.6% of all households were made up of individuals and 17.2% had someone living alone who was 65 years of age or older.

There were 1,176 housing units, of which 11.6% were vacant. The homeowner vacancy rate was 2.0% and the rental vacancy rate was 10.0%.

Racial composition as of the 2020 census
Race	Number	Percent
White	1,325	54.1%
Black or African American	932	38.1%
American Indian and Alaska Native	8	0.3%
Asian	30	1.2%
Native Hawaiian and Other Pacific Islander	3	0.1%
Some other race	45	1.8%
Two or more races	106	4.3%
Hispanic or Latino (of any race)	112	4.6%

=== 2010 census ===
As of the census of 2010, there were 2,396 people, 819 households, and 546 families residing in the city which indicated a +15.2 growth. The population density was 668.2 inhabitants per square mile (258.0/km^{2}). There were 922 housing units at an average density of 296.3 per square mile (114.4/km^{2}). The racial makeup of the city was 52.8% White, 39.4% African American, 0.08% Native American, 1.2% Asian, 0.03% from other races, and 1.5% from two or more races. Hispanic or Latino of any race were 4.4% of the population.

There were 967 households, out of which 25.4% had children under the age of 18 living with them, 42.7% were married couples living together, 21.1% had a female householder with no husband present, and 33.3% were non-families. 29.3% of all households were made up of individuals, and 12.6% had someone living alone who was 65 years of age or older. The average household size was 2.43 and the average family size was 3.01.

In the city, the population was spread out, with 22.5% under the age of 18, 9.7% from 18 to 24, 24.7% from 25 to 44, 24.4% from 45 to 64, and 18.8% who were 65 years of age or older. The median age was 40 years. For every 100 females, there were 82.4 males. For every 100 females age 18 and over, there were 74.5 males.

The median income for a household in the city was $26,250, and the median income for a family was $33,036. Males had a median income of $25,750 versus $17,180 for females. The per capita income for the city was $13,779. About 22.7% of families and 28.8% of the population were below the poverty line, including 44.7% of those under age 18 and 20.7% of those age 65 or over.

== Arts and culture ==
The annual Loris Bog-off is held on the third weekend in October, in the downtown Loris area. Chicken bog is a dish of chicken, rice, sausage and spices; it originated in the Pee Dee area of South Carolina. The Loris Bog-off features carnival-type rides, concessions, regional performers, and petting zoo animals. Local schools also participate in performances and many other contests such as duck calling are held.

Loris has a public library, a branch of the Horry County Memorial Library.

== Media ==
- The Loris Times (local news)
- Tabor-Loris Tribune (local news)

=== Radio ===
- WLSQ AM 1240
- WVCO FM 94.9

== Education ==
Horry County School District is the sole school district in the county.

== Infrastructure ==
Twin City Airport is a local airport for light aircraft. The Coast RTA bus system serves Loris.

== Notable people ==
- Robert H. Brooks, founder of Hooters in the mid-1980s and the Naturally Fresh Foods in Atlanta in 1966
