= WGLD-FM =

- Conway, South Carolina; United States
- Broadcast area: Myrtle Beach, South Carolina
- Frequency: 93.9 MHz
- Branding: 93.9 the Vibe

Programming
- Format: Urban contemporary

Ownership
- Owner: Steve Clendenin; (Maryland Media One, LLC)
- Sister stations: WYAY

History
- First air date: 1990 (as WJXY-FM)
- Former call signs: WJXY-FM (1990–2017); WMIR (2017–2021); WMIR-FM (2021–2022)
- Call sign meaning: approximation of "gold"

Technical information
- Licensing authority: FCC
- Facility ID: 17485
- Class: A
- ERP: 3,700 watts
- HAAT: 128 meters (420 ft)
- Transmitter coordinates: 33°50′7″N 78°52′6″W

Links
- Public license information: Public file; LMS
- Webcast: Listen Live
- Website: www.thecoast.rocks

WGLD-FM (93.9 FM; "The Vibe") is a radio station licensed to Conway, South Carolina. Established in 1990 as WJXY-FM, the station is owned by Maryland Media One, and broadcasts an urban contemporary format.

== History ==
In the early 1990s, WGLD-FM (as WJXY-FM) played country music as "94X". Starting November 1, 1996, WJXY-FM and WXJY were called "Cruisin' Country", with a format that included rock acts such as Lynyrd Skynyrd, The Allman Brothers Band and The Marshall Tucker Band. In April 1998, the formats of WJXY-FM and WXJY changed to rhythmic, and the stations were called "Hot 93". Later, the station moved in a mainstream CHR direction, and WSEA was added, so the stations were called "Hot 100 and Hot 93".

On February 15, 2003, WIQB 1050 AM was added, and the format changed to ESPN Radio and was named "The Team." WSEA began separate programming. The Team picked up the Clemson University sports programming on WIQB. Later that year, The Team added Coastal Carolina University Sports in its first-ever college football season opener. The air staff consisted of Zachery Kick and James Clark with its first local sports show.

In 2004, local broadcast veteran Frank Barnhill hosted "Carolina Sports Talk" on Mondays & Fridays during afternoon drive. In 2007, the show was replaced by the station with another local show, "The Locker Room" and expanded to Monday through Friday. Hosts of "The Locker Room" included Matt Monks (with Mad Max and "Playground Jesus"), Scot Clark, Matt Lincoln, Allen Smothers and Randy Clemens. Following Clemens' departure in June 2011 due to health concerns, the branding of the show ended and was revived in August 2011 as "The Drive" with new host Aaron Marks.

In 2010, "The Team" debuted the "CCU Tailgate Show", co-hosted by Barnhill and Allen Smothers which aired Saturdays for two hours prior to Coastal Carolina University football games.

The station also aired high school football and basketball games, as well as Carolina Panthers NFL games and regular ESPN Radio programming.

In July 2010, WXJY changed its simulcast partner to WSEA. Later in the year, WIQB became WHSC and began separate broadcasts.

On March 5, 2012, WJXY-FM became "Z-93", a Hot Adult Contemporary station. The ESPN Radio programming moved to sister station WSEA 100.3, which had previously been a CHR station as "i100."

On February 1, 2013, WJXY-FM changed from "Z-93" to a Southern rock and Country music hybrid format known as "93.9 The Outlaw". WXJY once again simulcast WJXY-FM.

On September 19, 2013, WJXY-FM/WXJY changed its format to news/talk, "News talk that matters." Programming included Don Imus, Mike Huckabee, Phil Valentine, John Batchelor, Red Eye Radio and the Washington Redskins.

With the demise of Huckabee's show, WJXY-FM/WXJY added Dennis Miller. When Miller retired, WJXY-FM/WXJY added Jonathon Brandmeier, known as "Johnny B", in the early afternoon. Mike Gallagher preceded Brandmeier each weekday.

On September 20, 2016, Cumulus' Joule Broadcasting announced that WJXY-FM/WXJY would be sold to Colonial Radio Group for $240,000. That sale was consummated on February 9, 2017, at which point WJXY-FM dropped its news/talk format and simulcast with WXJY and began stunting with a wheel of formats that included "Loveland 93.9" (love songs), "The Accordion" (polka), "The Bowery" (all-Alabama, a band discovered in Myrtle Beach), "Santa 94" (Christmas music), and "The King 93.9" (all-Elvis). A new format, country as "Carolina Country 93.9", would be announced on February 13, 2017 at 3 p.m.

On June 23, 2017, WJXY-FM changed callsigns to WMIR.

On January 3, 2020, WYAY, formerly WXJY, resumed simulcasting WMIR. The FM suffix was added on March 16, 2021, with the former WJXY becoming WMIR on March 23, 2021.

On April 30, 2021, WMIR-FM was sold to Maryland Media One, LLC. On May 17, 2021, WMIR-FM and WYAY, formerly WUDE, changed formats from country to oldies, branded as "Carolina Gold 93.9 & 106.3" with Andrulonis moving the Carolina Country format to WNMB. 93.9 would change callsigns to WGLD-FM to match on February 3, 2022. WPGI began simulcasting.

On December 28, 2023, WGLD-FM and WYAY split from the simulcast with WPGI and stunted with classic alternative, branded as "The Coast", before returning to Carolina Country as the stations returned to Andrulonis Media.

Other formats since 2023 have included country and urban contemporary.
