= Bolivia, North Carolina =

- Town
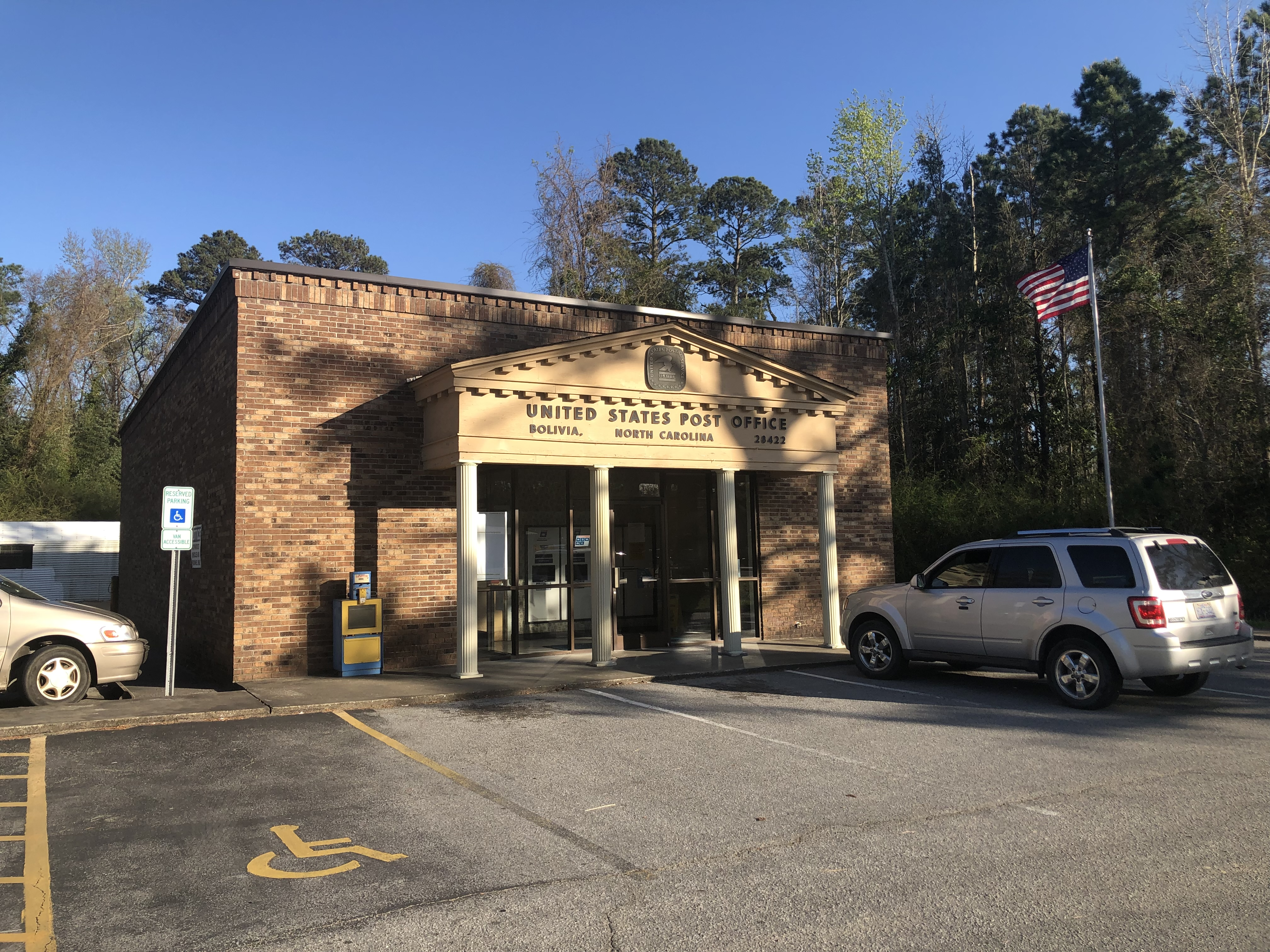
- Post office

- Location within the state of North Carolina Bolivia (the United States)
- Coordinates: 34°04′12″N 78°08′51″W
- Country: United States
- State: North Carolina
- County: Brunswick
- Named after: Bolivia

Area
  - Total: 0.64 sq mi (1.65 km^{2})
  - Land: 0.64 sq mi (1.65 km^{2})
  - Water: 0 sq mi (0.00 km^{2})
- Elevation: 39 ft (12 m)

Population (2020)
  - Total: 149
  - Density: 234.2/sq mi (90.42/km^{2})
- Time zone: UTC-5 (Eastern (EST))
  - Summer (DST): UTC-4 (EDT)
- ZIP code: 28422
- Area codes: 910, 472
- FIPS code: 37-06820
- GNIS feature ID: 2405298
- Website: https://townofbolivia.org/

Bolivia is a town in and the county seat of Brunswick County, North Carolina, United States. The population was 149 at the 2020 census.

== History ==
The town was settled by European Americans in the 1890s and was incorporated in 1911. One theory about the name is that many boxes being shipped from the area said "Bolivia", referring to the country in South America, and the people liked that name.

A post office called Bolivia has been in operation since 1892. The town is named after Bolivia, in South America. Bolivia was incorporated as a town in 1911.

National Airlines Flight 2511 blew up over Bolivia on January 6, 1960. The DC-6B was destroyed by an explosion of dynamite.

When U.S. 17 was widened to four lanes, a bypass was constructed around Bolivia; intended to improve traffic, the highway drew away visitors and retail customers, causing an economic decline in the town. In 1977, the county decided to move the county seat of Brunswick County from Southport to Bolivia. Being a center of government operations stimulated other businesses and had helped Bolivia build its businesses.

== Geography ==
Old U.S. Route 17 (Old Ocean Highway) passes through the center of the town, while the current U.S. Route 17 (Ocean Highway) bypasses it to the northwest. US-17 leads 18 miles (29 km) northeast to Wilmington and 53 miles (85 km) southwest to Myrtle Beach, South Carolina.

According to the United States Census Bureau, the town of Bolivia has a total area of 0.62 square miles (1.6 km^{2}), all land.

== Demographics ==
Historical population
Census	Pop.	Note	%±
1920	199		—
1930	156		−21.6%
1940	203		30.1%
1950	215		5.9%
1960	201		−6.5%
1970	185		−8.0%
1980	252		36.2%
1990	228		−9.5%
2000	148		−35.1%
2010	143		−3.4%
2020	149		4.2%
2023 (est.)	227	▲	52.3%
U.S. Decennial Census

=== 2020 census ===
Bolivia racial composition
Race	Number	Percentage
White (non-Hispanic)	139	93.29%
Native American	1	0.67%
Other/Mixed	5	3.36%
Hispanic or Latino	4	2.68%

As of the 2020 United States census, there were 149 people, 71 households, and 54 families residing in the town.

=== 2000 census ===
As of the census of 2000, there were 148 people, 58 households, and 45 families residing in the town. The population density was 224.7 inhabitants per square mile (86.8/km^{2}). There were 77 housing units at an average density of 116.9 units per square mile (45.1 units/km^{2}). The racial makeup of the town was 96.62% White, 1.35% African American, 1.35% Native American, and 0.68% from two or more races.

There were 58 households, out of which 31.0% had children under the age of 18 living with them, 55.2% were married couples living together, 17.2% had a female householder with no husband present, and 22.4% were non-families. 19.0% of all households were made up of individuals, and 15.5% had someone living alone who was 65 years of age or older. The average household size was 2.55 and the average family size was 2.84.

In the town, the population was spread out, with 25.7% under the age of 18, 5.4% from 18 to 24, 26.4% from 25 to 44, 20.9% from 45 to 64, and 21.6% who were 65 years of age or older. The median age was 38 years. For every 100 females, there were 76.2 males. For every 100 females age 18 and over, there were 74.6 males.

The median income for a household in the town was $33,125, and the median income for a family was $35,625. Males had a median income of $26,250 versus $20,000 for females. The per capita income for the town was $12,973. There were 7.3% of families and 13.5% of the population living below the poverty line, including 12.9% of under eighteens and none of those over 64.
