= Atlantic Beach, South Carolina =

- Town
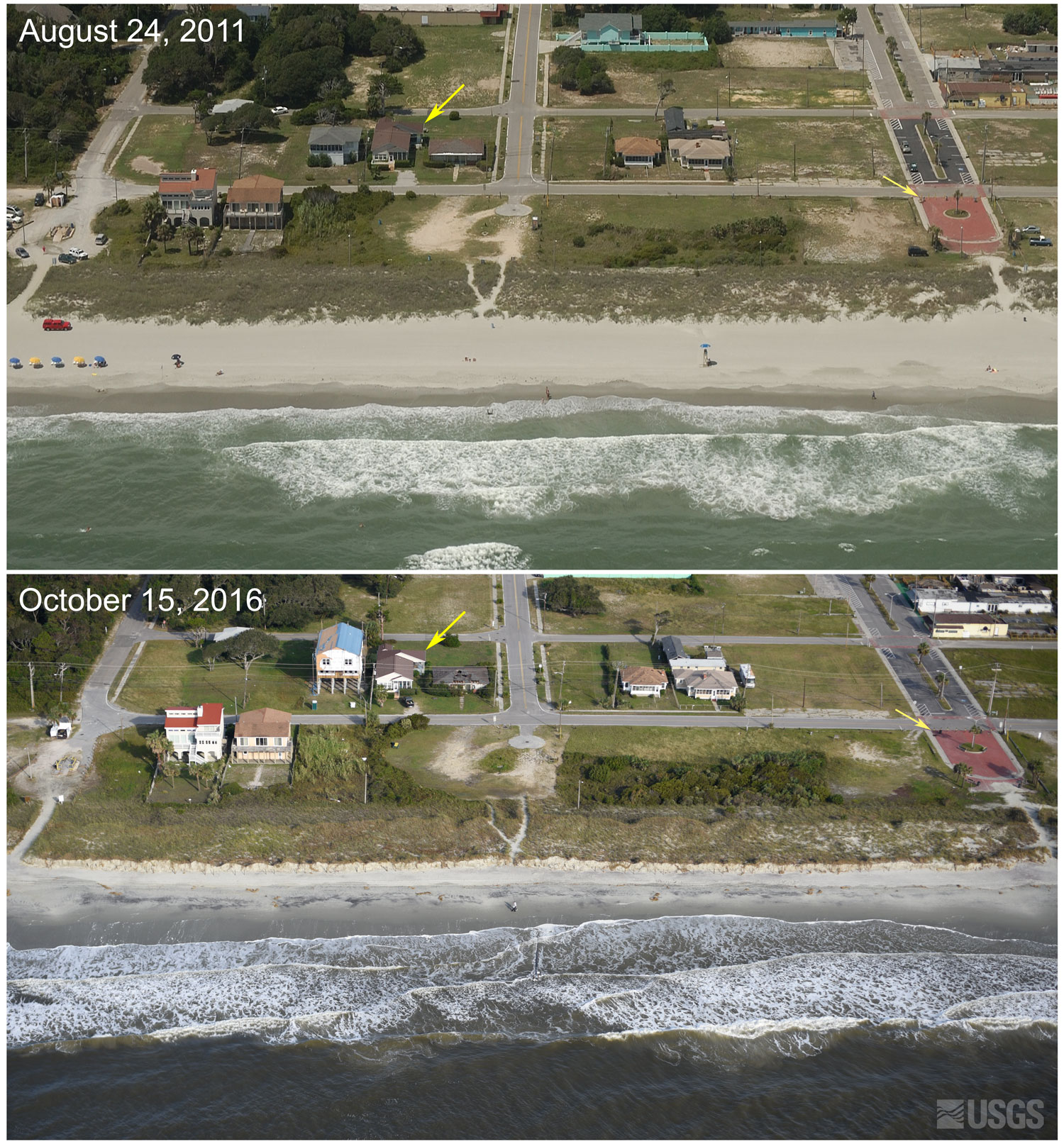
- Oblique aerial photographs at Atlantic Beach, South Carolina
- Nickname: The Black Pearl
- Location within the state of South Carolina Atlantic Beach (the United States) Atlantic Beach (North America)
- Coordinates: 33°48′13″N 78°43′04″W
- Country: United States
- State: South Carolina
- County: Horry

Area
  - Total: 0.16 sq mi (0.42 km^{2})
  - Land: 0.16 sq mi (0.42 km^{2})
  - Water: 0 sq mi (0.00 km^{2})
- Elevation: 30 ft (9.1 m)

Population (2020)
  - Total: 195
  - Estimate (2025): 472
  - Density: 1,206.3/sq mi (465.74/km^{2})
- Time zone: UTC-5 (Eastern (EST))
  - Summer (DST): UTC-4 (EDT)
- ZIP code: 29582
- Area codes: 843, 854
- FIPS code: 45-03205
- GNIS feature ID: 2405179
- Website: www.townofatlanticbeachsc.com

Atlantic Beach is a town in Horry County, South Carolina, United States, part of the Grand Strand tourist region. As of the 2020 census, Atlantic Beach had a population of 195. Most of the land around the town is annexed into the city of North Myrtle Beach.

== History ==
Atlantic Beach is commonly nicknamed "The Black Pearl"; the rich culture of the town of Atlantic Beach was formed of mostly Gullah people, descendants of slaves who lived for 300 years on the Sea Islands from Wilmington, North Carolina to Jacksonville, Florida. In the early 1930s, defying Jim Crow laws in the segregated South, debunking Black stereotypes, and broadening the enterprises of the Gullah people, Black women and men opened hotels, restaurants, night clubs, and novelty shops in Atlantic Beach. Visitors would travel along Interstate 95, US 17 and SC 9, coming from nearby southern states, where racial segregation took its toll.

== Geography ==
According to the United States Census Bureau, the town has a total area of 0.2 square miles (0.52 km^{2}), all land.

== Demographics ==
Historical population
Census	Pop.	Note	%±
1970	215		—
1980	289		34.4%
1990	446		54.3%
2000	351		−21.3%
2010	334		−4.8%
2020	195		−41.6%
2025 (est.)	472		142.1%
U.S. Decennial Census

=== Racial and ethnic composition ===
Atlantic Beach town, South Carolina – Racial and ethnic composition Note: the US Census treats Hispanic/Latino as an ethnic category. This table excludes Latinos from the racial categories and assigns them to a separate category. Hispanics/Latinos may be of any race.
Race / Ethnicity (NH = Non-Hispanic)	Pop 2000	Pop 2010	Pop 2020	% 2000	% 2010	% 2020
White alone (NH)	27	86	77	7.69%	25.75%	39.49%
Black or African American alone (NH)	288	181	88	82.05%	54.19%	45.13%
Native American or Alaska Native alone (NH)	0	3	0	0.00%	0.90%	0.00%
Asian alone (NH)	0	0	3	0.00%	0.00%	1.54%
Native Hawaiian or Pacific Islander alone (NH)	0	0	0	0.00%	0.00%	0.00%
Other race alone (NH)	1	0	7	0.28%	0.00%	3.59%
Mixed race or Multiracial (NH)	0	9	8	0.00%	2.69%	4.10%
Hispanic or Latino (any race)	35	55	12	9.97%	16.47%	6.15%
Total	351	334	195	100.00%	100.00%	100.00%

=== 2020 census ===
As of the 2020 United States census, there were 195 people, 87 households, and 39 families residing in the town.

=== 2000 census ===
At the 2000 census there were 351 people, 132 households, and 83 families in the town. The population density was 2,214.5 inhabitants per square mile (855.0/km^{2}). There were 244 housing units at an average density of 1,539.4 per square mile (594.4/km^{2}). The racial makeup of the town was 9.69% White, 82.05% African American, 7.12% from other races, and 1.14% from two or more races. Hispanic or Latino of any race were 9.97%.

Of the 132 households 39.4% had children under the age of 18 living with them, 18.9% were married couples living together, 37.1% had a female householder with no husband present, and 36.4% were non-families. 29.5% of households were one person and 6.8% were one person aged 65 or older. The average household size was 2.66 and the average family size was 3.17.

The age distribution was 29.6% under the age of 18, 9.7% from 18 to 24, 36.2% from 25 to 44, 15.1% from 45 to 64, and 9.4% 65 or older. The median age was 30 years. For every 100 females, there were 98.3 males. For every 100 females age 18 and over, there were 93.0 males.

The median household income was $24,375 and the median family income was $20,313. Males had a median income of $16,477 versus $17,000 for females. The per capita income for the town was $12,492. About 31.3% of families and 27.6% of the population were below the poverty line, including 37.0% of those under age 18 and 27.6% of those age 65 or over.

== Education ==
Horry County School District is the sole school district in the county.
