= WZFX =

Whiteville, North Carolina; United States
- Broadcast area: Fayetteville, North Carolina
- Frequency: 99.1 MHz (HD Radio)
- Branding: Foxy 99

Programming
- Format: Mainstream urban
- Subchannels: HD2: Adult contemporary "Sunny 94.3"
- Affiliations: The Breakfast Club

Ownership
- Owner: Beasley Broadcast Group, Inc.; (Beasley Media Group Licenses, LLC)
- Sister stations: WAZZ, WFLB, WKML, WUKS

History
- First air date: 1978 (as WENC-FM)
- Former call signs: WENC-FM (1978–1980); WQTR (1980–1986)
- Call sign meaning: W Z FoXy

Technical information
- Licensing authority: FCC
- Facility ID: 32376
- Class: C1
- ERP: 100,000 watts
- HAAT: 299 meters (981 ft)
- Transmitter coordinates: 34°44′5″N 78°47′25″W
- Translators: 94.3 W232CI (Fayetteville, relays HD2)

Links
- Public license information: Public file; LMS
- Webcast: Listen live HD2: Listen live
- Website: foxy99.com sunny943.com (HD2)

WZFX (99.1 FM) is an mainstream urban formatted broadcast radio station licensed to Whiteville, North Carolina and located in Fayetteville, North Carolina. WZFX broadcasts under the branding "Foxy 99." WZFX is owned and operated by Beasley Media Group. Its studios are located east of downtown Fayetteville, and its transmitter is located in Tar Heel, North Carolina.

As of the fall 2021 ratings period, WZFX has the highest ratings of any radio station in the Fayetteville market.

== WENC/WQTR ==
99.1 FM first signed on as WENC FM in 1978 with its license in the city of Whiteville. It is believed the frequency signed on with 5,000 watts at this time.

=== WZFX ===
In March 1986, WQTR-FM increased its power to 100,000 watts, changed to WZFX, and became "The All New FM 99 The Fox, WZFX". The station has a Rhythmic Top-40 format. The new owners were Steve Weil of Goldsboro, North Carolina, his brother Henry Weil, and his sister Leslie Weil.

=== The Fox to Foxy 99 ===
In 1987, WZFX evolved into an Urban/CHR a.k.a. CHUrban format playing such artist as New Edition, Lillo Thomas, Force MD's and Troop. WZFX changed its moniker to "99.1 the Fox"; however, in 1995 brought back the "Original Foxy 99" and broadcast its 100,000-watt signal on the air "From the Capital City to the Coast". WZFX is the sister station of WIKS in Jacksonville, North Carolina, which also has a similar format and signal power of 100,000 watts.

In 1990, after WQSM stopped playing top 40, WZFX added some top 40 hits to its music mix. This move took "The Fox" back to the top of the ratings. In 1994, WZFX moved from the Wachovia building to a former Cato department store, which the owners purchased.

In 1995, Atlantic Broadcasting Group sold WROV-FM to Ray Thomas of Roanoke, Virginia and WLNI in Lynchburg, Virginia, leaving the company with only WZFX. Several DJs and general manager Lynn Carraway were let go. At the time, WZFX played no rap until after 5 in the afternoon, and rap-leaning WLRD was doing very well despite its limited signal.

In 1997, Beasley Broadcasting—owner of WKML, WTSB, WAZZ and WEWO—bought WZFX from Joyner Communications. There was talk in 1996 of another company buying WZFX and WLRD, but that deal fell apart. Later in the year, Beasley also bought WLRD and WYRU. For a short time, WLRD aired the programming of WZFX.

== Interference issues northwest of Fayetteville ==
WZFX's signal north of Carthage, Moore County begins to see significant interference from WSLQ-FM out of Roanoke, Virginia. This is also the case in southern Chatham County, much of Montgomery and Randolph Counties and nearly all of Wake County. Under ideal atmospheric conditions, WZFX can be received with little to no interference from WSLQ as far north as Burlington, Greensboro, High Point, Hillsborough and Durham.
