= WFLB =

- Laurinburg, North Carolina; United States
- Broadcast area: Fayetteville, North Carolina
- Frequency: 96.5 MHz (HD Radio)
- Branding: 96.5 Jack FM

Programming
- Format: Adult hits
- Subchannels: HD2: "96.5 HD2, Chaos HD2"

Ownership
- Owner: Beasley Broadcasting Group, Inc.; (Beasley Media Group Licenses, LLC)
- Sister stations: WAZZ, WKML, WUKS, WZFX

History
- First air date: 1947; 79 years ago
- Former call signs: WEWO-FM (1947–1968); WSTS (1968–1990); WMXF-FM (1990–1993); WAZZ (1993–1997)
- Call sign meaning: "Fayetteville, Laurinburg"

Technical information
- Licensing authority: FCC
- Facility ID: 9078
- Class: C
- ERP: 100,000 watts
- HAAT: 318 meters (1,043 ft)
- Transmitter coordinates: 34°46′49.6″N 79°2′44.1″W

Links
- Public license information: Public file; LMS
- Webcast: Listen live
- Website: playjackradio.com

WFLB (96.5 FM, "96.5 Jack FM") is an adult hits radio station located in Fayetteville, North Carolina, owned by Beasley Broadcasting Group, Inc., through licensee Beasley Media Group, LLC. The WFLB studios are located east of downtown Fayetteville, and its transmitter is located north of Lumberton, North Carolina.

== History ==
WEWO-FM began in Laurinburg in 1947, a sister station to WEWO. Don Curtis purchased the stations in 1968, and WEWO-FM became a Christian radio station called WSTS, The station received a power increase to 100,000 watts to reach Fayetteville. Durham Life Broadcasting later bought the stations.

In 1989, WSTS dropped religious programming and became CHR WMXF "Mix 96". Dale O'Brian, former Program Director/Morning host at WKSI in Greensboro was hired as Program Director of MIX 96. He brought in talent from the Greensboro market and the station did very well. The airstaff was arguably the best in the market. The lineup included Dale O'Brian and Tank Sherman on mornings, Leah Scott on Mid-days, Pete Moss in Afternoons, Joe Mama Nights and Sammy Simpson late nights. The station created great street buzz and was very visible in the Fayetteville market. The WSTS letters and a similar format moved to a station in Fairmont. Durham Life sold its radio stations, and Curtis once again owned the 96.5 frequency, as well as other Durham Life stations.

On April 1, 1993, WMXF began stunting with a loop of "Louie, Louie" by The Kingsmen, changing the station's name temporarily to "Louis 96.5." The real format turned out to be "Oldies 96.5," and the call letters changed to WAZZ.

Beasley Broadcasting bought WAZZ in the mid-1990s, along with WFLB, the former Top 40 station in Fayetteville. Beasley gave WAZZ and WFLB each other's callsigns. The AM began broadcasting February 18, 1948, on 1490 kHz with 250 watts of power. The station was operated by Fayetteville Broadcasters Inc.

On December 30, 2005, Oldies 96.5 changed to classic hits as 96.5 the Drive. Program director Dave Stone described the difference this way: oldies included Buddy Holly and Elvis Presley, while classic hits focuses on the 70s and artists such as the Eagles and the Doobie Brothers.

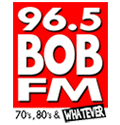
Logo under former slogan

Previous logo

On March 14, 2011, WFLB changed their format to adult hits, branded as "Bob FM". The final song as 96.5 The Drive was Elton John's Funeral for a Friend. The first songs as 96.5 Bob FM were The Gap Band's You Dropped a Bomb on Me and R.E.M.'s Losing My Religion. While the station initially used the slogan "we play everything" along with a wide variety of music from the 1960s through 2000s, the station shifted to a classic hits format, emphasizing pop and rock hits from the 1970s and 1980s, with occasional hits from the 1990s.

On November 1, 2019, WFLB changed to a holiday music format, ending their regular music format temporarily until Christmas 2019.

On August 8, 2024, WFLB, with a variety hits format, rebranded as "96.5 Jack FM".
