= WYDU =

- Red Springs, North Carolina; United States
- Frequency: 1160 kHz

Programming
- Format: Urban contemporary gospel

Ownership
- Owner: Sandra and Charles Cookman; (WEDU Broadcasting Inc.)
- Sister stations: WIDU

History
- First air date: June 15, 1970
- Former call signs: WYRU (1970–1998); WTEL (1998–2000); WYRU (2000); WTEL (2000–2001); WYRU (2001–2003); WTEL (2003–2014)

Technical information
- Licensing authority: FCC
- Facility ID: 39240
- Class: B
- Power: 5,000 watts (day); 250 watts (night)
- Transmitter coordinates: 34°50′19″N 79°10′36″W
- Translator: 98.5 W253DC (Red Springs)

Links
- Public license information: Public file; LMS
- Webcast: Listen live
- Website: www.wydu1160.com

WYDU (1160 AM) is a radio station broadcasting an urban contemporary gospel format licensed to Red Springs, North Carolina, United States. The station is currently owned by Sandra and Charles Cookman, through licensee WEDU Broadcasting Inc.

== History ==
In 1990, WYRU switched to a full-time gospel format with a mix of musical styles, after having played black gospel in the evenings.

Two years after Carolina Radio Group executive director Gene Hanrahan came to work there, WYRU was doing so well that a new FM station, WLRD, was added.

In 1997, Beasley Broadcasting purchased WYRU and WLRD from Lumbee Regional Development Association for about $1.2 million. Beasley sold the station to its present owner in 2015.
