= WAGR (AM) =

Radio station in Lumberton, North Carolina

- Lumberton, North Carolina; United States
- Frequency: 1340 kHz

Programming
- Format: Gospel

Ownership
- Owner: WAGR Broadcasting, Inc

History
- First air date: 1954
- Call sign meaning: Where Advertising Gets Results

Technical information
- Licensing authority: FCC
- Facility ID: 41310
- Class: C
- Power: 1000 watts
- Transmitter coordinates: 34°35′58.00″N 79°0′33.00″W
- Translator: (97.1 MHz) W246DR (Lumberton)

Links
- Public license information: Public file; LMS

WAGR (1340 AM) is a radio station broadcasting a Gospel music format to the Lumberton, North Carolina, United States, area. The station is currently owned by WAGR Broadcasting, Inc.

== History ==
Al Kahn bought WAGR in January 1957, 27 months after the station signed on, and signed WJSK on the air in 1964. He ran both stations until 1992.

After Messa Corp. bought the stations from Southeastern Broadcasting Corp. in July 1992, WAGR and WJSK ended their tradition of airing only Lumberton high school football and began carrying games involving other Robeson County teams.

In 1993, Arthur DeBerry and Associates of Durham bought WAGR and WJSK.

After WJSK was sold to Cape Fear Broadcasting in 1998, Wes Cookman, owner of Fayetteville radio station WIDU, bought WAGR, along with WEWO in Laurinburg.

Later, Cookman added WFMO in Fairmont to what was called "WE-DO" network, whose black gospel and news and information programming originated from the WIDU studios.
