= WADB =

WADB may refer to:

- West African Development Bank
- WOBM (AM), a radio station (1310 AM) licensed to Asbury Park, New Jersey, United States, which held the call sign WADB from 1996 to 2008, and again from 2009 to 2023
- WRAT, a radio station (95.9 FM) licensed to Point Pleasant, New Jersey, United States, which held the call sign WADB from 1968 to 1996
