= George G. Beasley =

American radio executive (1932–2021)

- Born: George Garland Beasley; April 9, 1932; Ararat, Virginia
- Died: June 2, 2021 (aged 89); Naples, Florida
- Education: Appalachian State University, Boone
- Spouse: Shirley Ann Beasley
- Children: Caroline Beasley, Deborah, Teresa, Trina, Lisa

George G. Beasley (April 9, 1932 – June 2, 2021) was a radio broadcast pioneer and philanthropist. Beasley's company, Beasley Broadcast Group, has operated over 64 radio stations across the United States making it one of the largest in the nation. Beasley was inducted into the Country Music Radio Hall of Fame. He is also a member of the Radio Hall of Fame.

== Early life ==
Born in Ararat, Virginia, Beasley joined the Army in 1953. Using his GI bill, Beasley attended Appalachian State University where he earned both a Bachelor of Science and Master's degree in Education. He was principal of Dan River High School.

=== Early career ===
Beasley began his career at WPYB, an AM radio station in Benson, North Carolina. Founded in 1961, this WPYB-AM was the first radio station of Beasley.

== Career ==
George G. Beasley founded Beasley broadcasting in 1961. He was the founder and CEO of Beasley Broadcast Group. In 2000, the Beasley group issued IPO. The company is listed on NASDAQ with ticker the symbol BBGI. In 2016, his daughter Caroline became CEO. George Beasley remained on the board as chairman. Beasley also served on the board of trustees at Appalachian State University.

== Honors and awards ==
In 2013, Appalachian State University named a new building in honor of Beasley. The 18,000 square foot building is known as the George G. Beasley Media Complex.
