= Greater Media =

Former American media company

Greater Media, Inc.
- Type: Private
- Industry: Mass media
- Founded: 1956
- Defunct: 2016
- Headquarters: Braintree, Massachusetts, U.S.
- Area served: United States
- Key people: Peter H. Smyth (Chairman & Chief executive officer)
- Products: Radio stations
- Divisions: Radio Broadcasting; Newspaper
- Website: Greater-Media.com

Greater Media, Inc., known as Greater Media, was an American media company that specialized in radio stations. The markets where they owned radio stations included Boston, Detroit, Philadelphia, Charlotte, and the state of New Jersey. The company was formed in 1956 in Southbridge, Massachusetts, and its headquarters were located in Braintree, Massachusetts.

Greater Media also published several weekly newspapers in Central New Jersey. The newspaper group won 12 Suburban Newspapers of America awards for 2006.

On November 12, 2007, Greater Media announced it was buying three stations in Charlotte, North Carolina from Lincoln Financial Media--WBT, WBT-FM, and WLNK. The deal was finalized on January 31, 2008.

On July 19, 2016, Beasley Broadcast Group announced that it would acquire Greater Media's radio stations for $240 million. The FCC approved the sale on October 6, and the sale closed on October 29. The Greater Media newspapers were sold to the Newspaper Media Group.

== List of radio stations ==
=== Boston ===
- WROR-FM 105.7 FM — Classic Hits
- WKLB-FM 102.5 FM — Country
- WBQT 96.9 FM — Rhythmic AC
- WMJX 106.7 FM — Adult Contemporary
- WBOS 92.9 FM — Modern Rock

=== Detroit ===
- WCSX 94.7 FM — Classic Rock
- WMGC-FM 105.1 FM — Classic Hip Hop
- WRIF 101.1 FM — Active Rock

=== New Jersey ===
- WMGQ 98.3 FM — Adult Contemporary, New Brunswick
- WCTC 1450 AM — Talk, New Brunswick
- WDHA-FM 105.5 FM — Rock, Dover
- WMTR 1250 AM —Oldies; Morristown
- WRAT 95.9 FM — Rock, Point Pleasant
- WJRZ-FM 100.1 FM — Adult Contemporary, Manahawkin

=== Philadelphia ===
- WPEN 97.5 FM — Sports
- WMGK 102.9 FM — Classic Rock
- WMMR 93.3 FM — Rock
- WBEN-FM 95.7 FM — Adult Hits

=== Charlotte ===
- WLNK 107.9 FM — Adult Contemporary
- WBT 1110 AM — News/Talk
- WBT-FM 99.3 FM — News/Talk (simulcast of WBT)

== List of publications ==
Names in parentheses are the markets they serve, all of which are in New Jersey.

- Atlanticville (Eatontown, Long Branch, Monmouth Beach, Ocean Township, West Long Branch)
- the hub (Fair Haven, Little Silver, Oceanport, Red Bank, Rumson, Sea Bright, Shrewsbury, Tinton Falls)
- Examiner (Allentown, Millstone, Roosevelt, Upper Freehold)
- Independent (Aberdeen, Hazlet, Holmdel, Keyport, Matawan, Middletown)
- News Transcript (Colts Neck, Englishtown, Freehold, Manalapan, Marlboro)
- Tri-Town News (Howell, Jackson, Lakewood, Plumsted)
- Edison/Metuchen Sentinel (Edison, Metuchen)
- North/South Brunswick Sentinel (North Brunswick, South Brunswick)
- East Brunswick Sentinel (East Brunswick, Helmetta, Jamesburg, Milltown, Monroe, South River, Spotswood)
- Suburban (Old Bridge, Sayreville)
