= WFMO =

Radio station in Fairmont, North Carolina

- Fairmont, North Carolina; United States
- Frequency: 860 kHz

Programming
- Format: Urban Gospel
- Affiliations: Reach Media

Ownership
- Owner: Stuart Epperson, Jr.; (Truth Broadcasting Corporation)
- Sister stations: WSTS, WPOL, WKEW

Technical information
- Licensing authority: FCC
- Facility ID: 53609
- Class: D
- Power: 1,000 watts day 12 watts night
- Transmitter coordinates: 33°49′40.00″N 79°10′20.00″W

Links
- Public license information: Public file; LMS

WFMO (860 AM) is a radio station broadcasting an Urban Gospel format. Licensed to Fairmont, North Carolina, United States, the station is currently owned by Stuart Epperson, Jr., through licensee Truth Broadcasting Corporation.

== History ==
Jim Clark's Pro-Media Inc. owned WFMO and WSTS when WFMO became part of the "WE-DO" black gospel and news and information network started by Wes Cookman's WIDU in Fayetteville, along with WAGR and WEWO.

WFMO and WSTS were sold by Davidson Media Group to Truth Broadcasting effective April 14, 2015, at a price of $475,000.

Effective April 12, 2017, WFMO airs similar programming to sister stations WPOL and WKEW which consists of Erica Campbell, Willie Moore Jr, as well as other urban gospel programming.
