= WIDU =

Radio station in Fayetteville, North Carolina

- Fayetteville, North Carolina; United States
- Broadcast area: Fayetteville metropolitan area
- Frequency: 1600 kHz
- Branding: WIDU 1600 & 99.7

Programming
- Format: Gospel music

Ownership
- Owner: WIDU Broadcasting, Inc.

History
- First air date: December 1958

Technical information
- Licensing authority: FCC
- Class: D
- Power: 5,000 watts day; 147 watts night
- Transmitter coordinates: 35°05′54″N 78°53′12″W
- Translator: 99.7 W259CY (Fayetteville)

Links
- Public license information: Public file; LMS
- Webcast: Listen live
- Website: www.widu1600.com

WIDU (1600 AM) is a radio station broadcasting a gospel music format. Licensed to Fayetteville, North Carolina, United States, it serves the Fayetteville metropolitan area. The station is owned by WIDU Broadcasting, Inc.

== History ==
WIDU was Fayetteville's fourth radio station when it signed on in December 1958 with 1,000 watts of power and a Top 40 format. Six years later, WIDU became the city's first black radio station. In 1987, Wes Cookman, who is white and later married a black woman he met at WIDU, became majority owner and changed its format to black gospel. Bill Belche Sr., one of those who started the station, had recently died and the WIDU was having trouble competing with larger stations.

In 1998, Cookman bought WAGR in Lumberton and WEWO in Laurinburg.

Later, Cookman added WFMO in Fairmont to what was called "WE-DO" network, whose black gospel and news and information programming originated from the WIDU studios.

Terry Jordan of WFNC became the WE-DO network's only white host in 2001 but ended up moving the show to WAZZ after two weeks; he remained an engineer for WE-DO network.

In 2012, Cookman was hosting the "issue-driven and knowledge-based" morning show called "Wake Up", which aired from 9 A.M. to 1 P.M. weekdays. Kirk deViere hosted the program Tuesdays and Thursdays. WIDU also aired church services on Sundays. In 2010, Cookman received the Order of the Long Leaf Pine from North Carolina Governor Beverly Perdue.
