= WDHA-FM =

Radio station in Dover, New Jersey, United States

- Dover, New Jersey; United States
- Broadcast area: Morristown, New Jersey
- Frequency: 105.5 MHz (HD Radio)
- Branding: WDHA 105.5

Programming
- Format: Mainstream rock

Ownership
- Owner: Beasley Broadcast Group; (Beasley Media Group Licenses, LLC)
- Sister stations: WMTR, WCTC, WMGQ, WJRZ-FM, WRAT

History
- First air date: February 22, 1961; 65 years ago
- Call sign meaning: Drexel Hill Associates (original owner)

Technical information
- Licensing authority: FCC
- Facility ID: 49587
- Class: A
- ERP: 1,000 watts
- HAAT: 175 meters (574 ft)
- Transmitter coordinates: 40°51′21.3″N 74°30′40.5″W

Links
- Public license information: Public file; LMS
- Website: wdhafm.com

WDHA-FM (105.5 MHz) is a commercial radio station licensed to Dover, New Jersey, and serving the Morris County area of North Jersey. WDHA is owned and operated by Beasley Broadcast Group and airs a mainstream rock radio format.

The station's studios and offices are at 55 Horsehill Road in Cedar Knolls. Its transmitter is off Casterline Road in Denville.

== Format ==
The station's playlist is made of up of classic rock of the 1970s and 1980s as well as active rock from the 1990s, 2000s, and today. The station calls itself "The Rock Of New Jersey." Core artists include the Rolling Stones, Led Zeppelin, Mötley Crüe, Queen, Pearl Jam, Metallica, Nirvana, The Doors, Foreigner, Aerosmith, Van Halen, Ozzy Osbourne and Rush. The station is local and live full-time.

In terms of ratings, the station is consistently the top local station in the Nielsen ratings for the Morristown radio market. WDHA has always scored good ratings in North Jersey, even when New York City had as many as three full-time rock stations.

== History ==
=== Early years ===
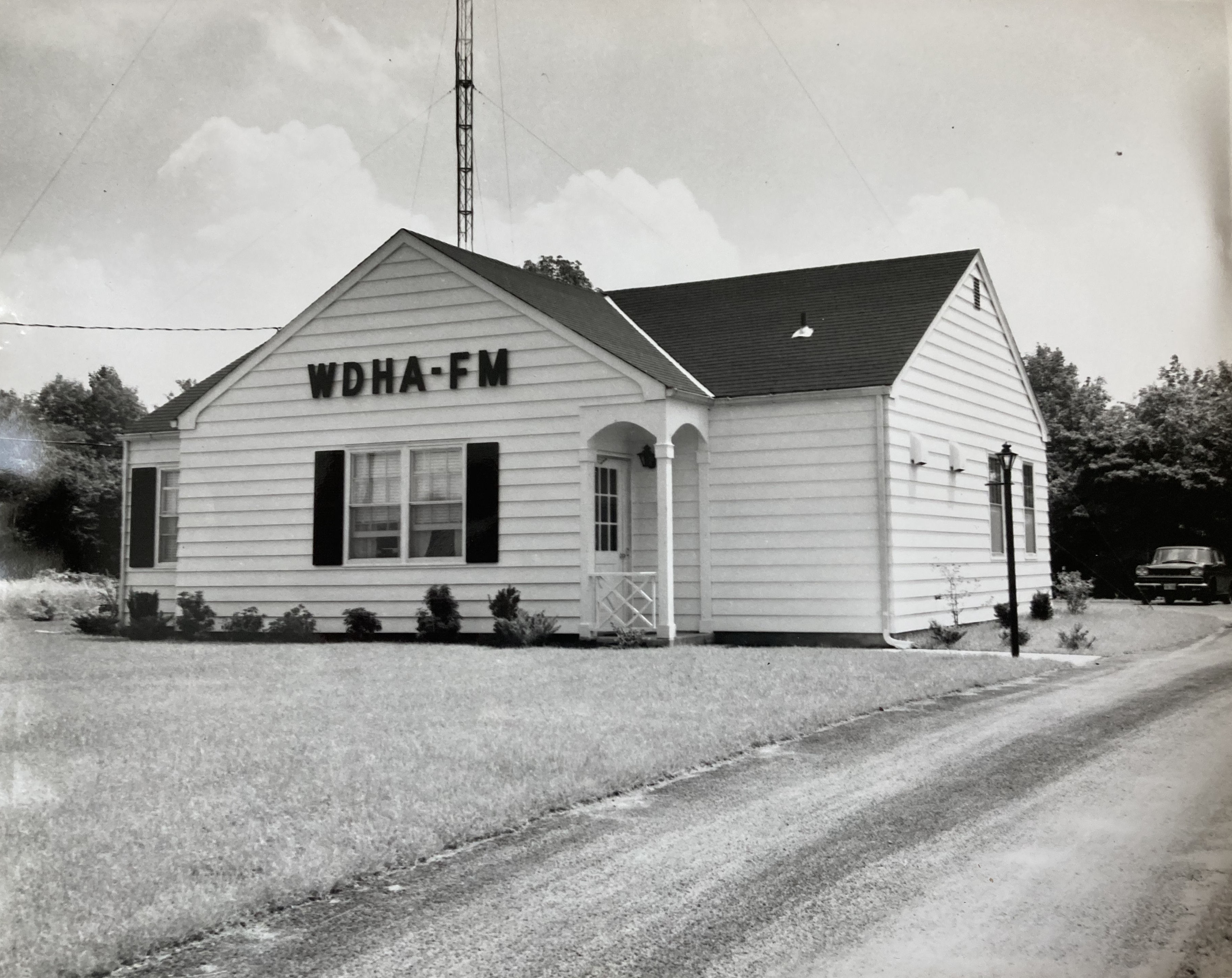
WDHA studios, c. 1961

WDHA first signed on the air on February 22, 1961. It ran with 3,000 watts of effective radiated power from atop Shongum Mountain, one of the highest peaks in Northern New Jersey. WDHA-FM was one of the first stereo stations in the United States, beginning stereo broadcasting within a year of sign-on. The owners actually built their first stereo generator.

While the studios were being constructed at 410 Route 10 in Randolph Township near Millbrook Avenue, temporary studios were established on the second floor of the old Goodale Drug Store building at 8 West Blackwell Street in downtown Dover.

Ground was broken for the new studios and offices on Monday December 12, 1960, during a snow storm that left high snow drifts and blowing wind. D. Ridgely Bolgiano, general manager, announced that construction of the new site would begin "next week with the station scheduled to go on the air by mid-February." Peter L. Arnow of Convent Station was president of the firm, and Walter C. Blaser of Wharton was named director of music.

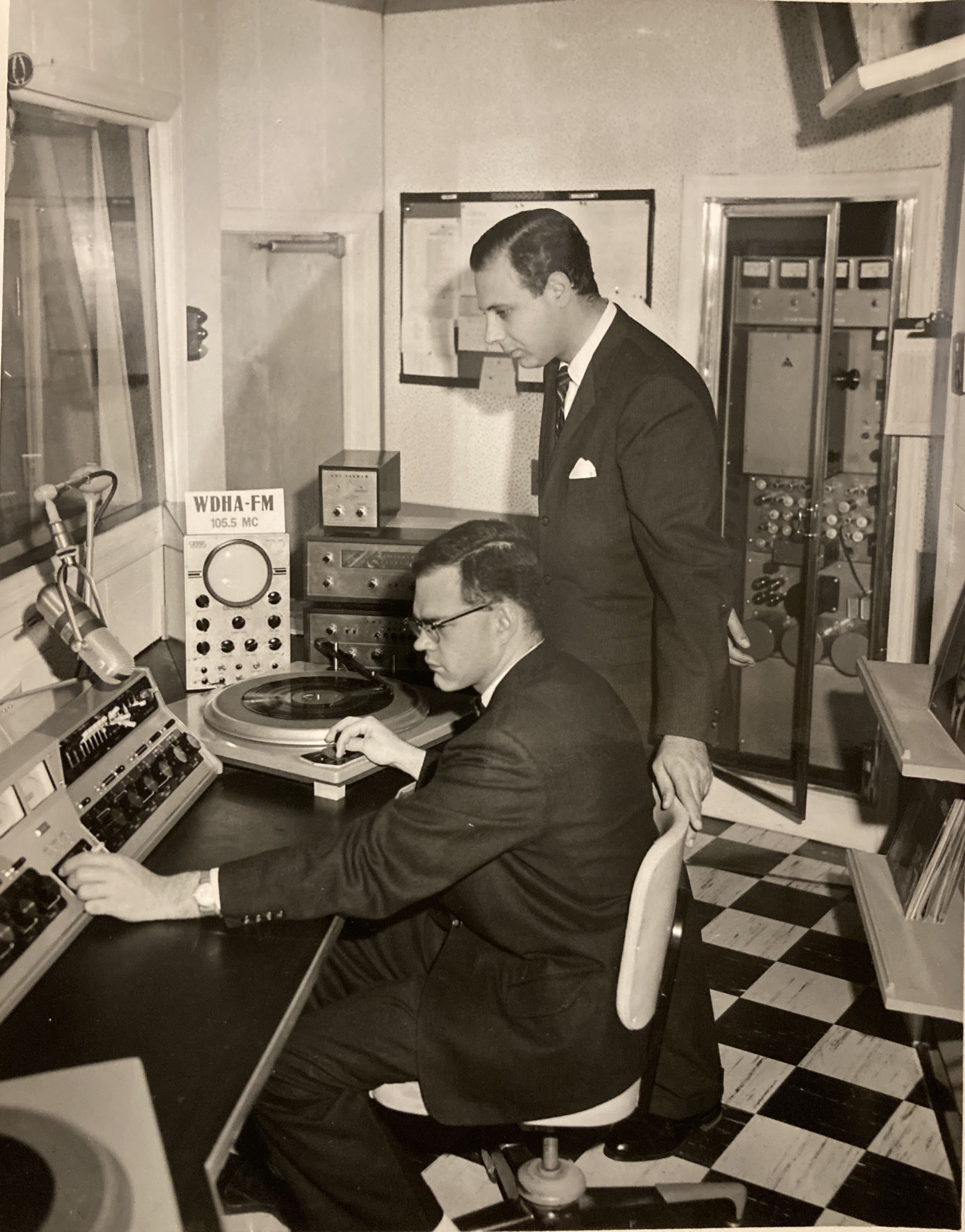
WDHA broadcast booth, c. 1961. D. Ridgely Bolgiano (seated) and unknown person.

The studios and transmitter building were still under construction when the station went on the air with non-stop classical music, 18 hours a day, seven days a week. A 100-foot tower was erected next to the transmitter building on Route 10, and a small intercom system was installed to communicate between those at the transmitter site and those at the studios in downtown Dover. 1510 WRAN, also licensed to Dover, did not go on the air until 1963. There was concern that the WDHA tower was affecting WRAN's directional antenna so WDHA's transmitter was relocated on one of WRAN's towers. (AM 1510 is now WRNJ in Hackettstown.)

The WDHA call sign stands for "Drexel Hill Associates," the original owner of the station. Drexel Hill was headed by Peter Arnow who moved to Morris County from Drexel Hill, Pennsylvania, and along with his associates took the name of "Drexel Hill Associates" for the name of their newly established company. It was often said the radio station was a college graduation gift from Mr. Arnow's father.

WDHA was licensed by the Federal Communications Commission (FCC) to the city of Dover, one of the few towns in New Jersey which the FCC allocated both an AM and FM frequency. The AM frequency of 1510 kHz became WRAN. That station operated its studios and transmitter directly behind WDHA. With WRAN's four huge red-blinking towers, for many years passing motorists thought they belonged to WDHA since WDHA's building was located in view of the highway, while WRAN's building sat in the middle of a field, out of sight. In reality, only directional AM stations need more than one tower.

Peter Arnow and his associate Robert Linder operated the station together for many years. Eventually, they bought AM 1250 WMTR in Morristown and operated both an AM and FM radio station with one facility being at 10 Park Place in Morristown and the other on Route 10. Even though the music formats were always different, the newscasts were simulcast on both stations for many years.

=== Pop music ===
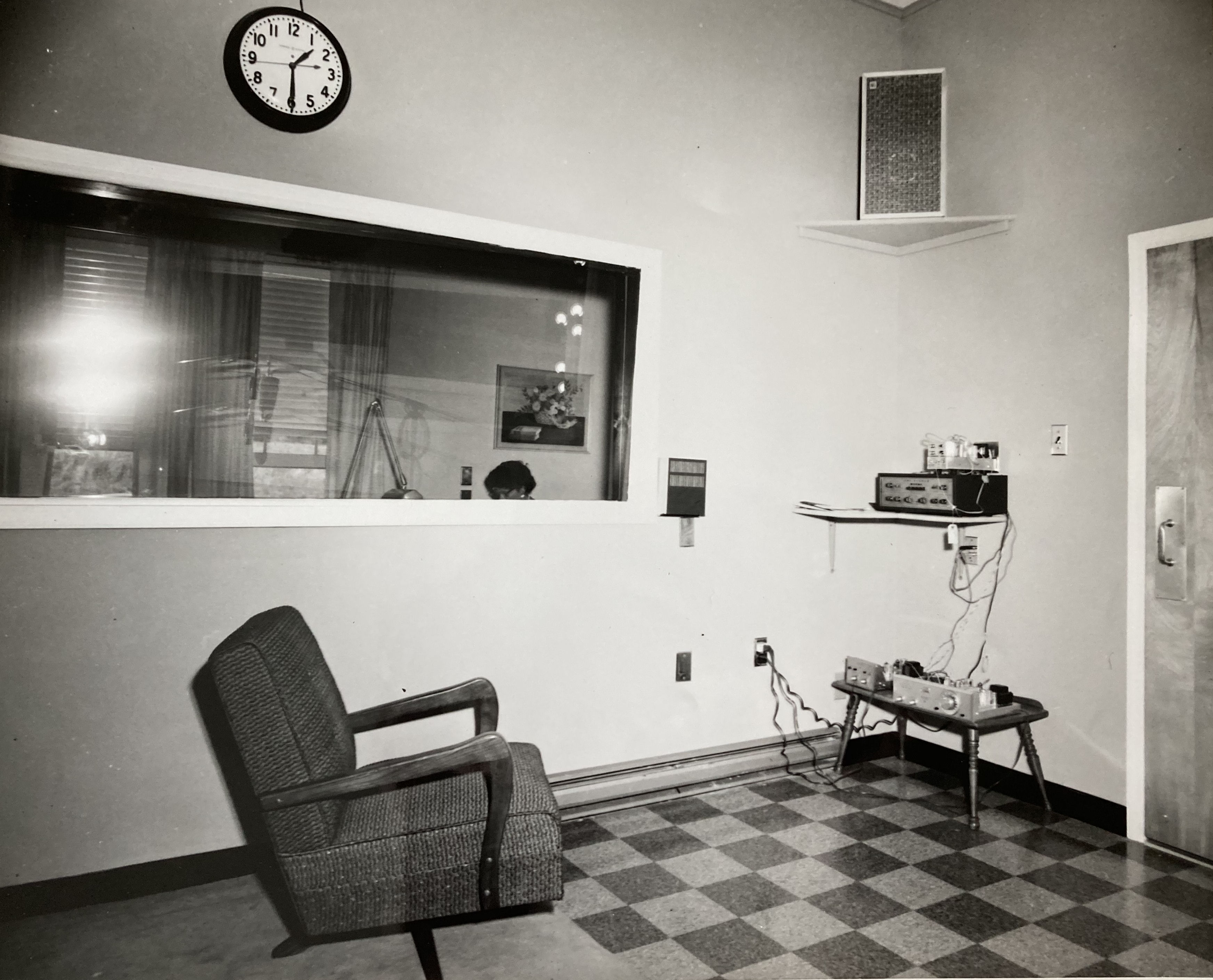
Lobby of WDHA c. 1961

WDHA later played adult pop hits during the day but still had classical music as well as jazz block programming at night. The station began broadcasting in stereo in 1972. WDHA studios had been located in Randolph Township while WMTR was located in Cedar Knolls. WDHA and WMTR also simulcast a one-hour lunchtime news/talk show.

Over the years, WDHA's music format evolved, and the station began airing contemporary music at night with the classical format during the day. Soon, WDHA dropped its classical format altogether and went with strictly contemporary pop, later adding rock. From 1972 to 1974, WDHA gradually moved away from pop hits and evolved into a soft rock/adult contemporary format. Initially, the station avoided hard rock. By 1975, WDHA played the available album versions of hit songs, instead of the shorter single versions of the hits.

For a time in the 1970s, WDHA was capable of broadcasting in quadraphonic sound, one of only a handful of stations so equipped. By 1977, WDHA evolved into a hybrid Top 40/Album Rock format, blending both types of music. Harder rock was gradually mixed in while pop hits were being phased out. By 1978, WDHA became known as "The Jersey Giant."

=== Switch to Rock ===
By 1980, WDHA had evolved into a full time album rock station, competing with WPLJ and WNEW-FM, New York's two rock stations. In 1984, WDHA was the world's first radio station to play compact discs, a new invention that would replace vinyl records. By the late 1980s, more heavy metal bands were heard while the station still kept a balance between classic rock and new rock.

In 1990, WDHA moved out of its Randolph facilities and into new Cedar Knolls studios, along with sister station 1250 WMTR. In 1991, WDHA and WMTR were sold by Drexel Hill Associates to Signal Communications. The formats were unaffected, and WDHA continued as a rock station.

In the mid 1990s, Signal Communications restructured and became known as New Jersey Broadcast Partners. The station began referring to itself as "Classic Rock/New Rock." By the late 1990s, WDHA was positioned between "K-Rock 92.3" WXRK (now WINS-FM) which played hard rock and alternative music, and "Q 104.3" WAXQ, which played classic rock.

=== Ownership changes ===
In 2001, WDHA was sold to Greater Media. Included in the deal were co-owned 1250 WMTR Morristown and 95.9 WRAT in Point Pleasant. Greater Media already owned 98.3 WMGQ and 1450 WCTC in New Brunswick. In the early 2000s, WDHA began broadcasting in the HD Radio format. WDHA HD-1 rebroadcasts WDHA's main analog signal. There has been some consideration paid to adding WMTR's oldies format to WDHA HD-2, but no decision has been made on this yet.

On July 19, 2016, the Beasley Media Group announced it would acquire Greater Media and its 21 stations, including WDHA, for $240 million. The FCC approved the sale on October 6, and the sale closed on November 1.
