= WCTC =

Sports radio station in New Brunswick, New Jersey

- New Brunswick, New Jersey; United States
- Broadcast area: Middlesex County, New Jersey
- Frequency: 1450 kHz
- Branding: Fox Sports New Jersey

Programming
- Format: Sports radio
- Affiliations: Fox Sports Radio; NBC News Radio; New York Knicks; New York Rangers; Rutgers Scarlet Knights; Somerset Patriots

Ownership
- Owner: Beasley Broadcast Group; (Beasley Media Group Licenses, LLC)
- Sister stations: WMGQ; WDHA-FM; WMTR; WJRZ-FM; WRAT

History
- First air date: December 12, 1946
- Call sign meaning: No meaning, close to the initials of Chanticleer Broadcasting Company (original owner)

Technical information
- Licensing authority: FCC
- Facility ID: 55180
- Class: C
- Power: 1,000 watts unlimited; 250 watts auxiliary (backup)
- Transmitter coordinates: 40°29′32.4″N 74°25′9.5″W; 40°28′37.4″N 74°29′31.6″W auxiliary (backup)
- Translator: 93.5 W228DY (New Brunswick)

Links
- Public license information: Public file; LMS
- Webcast: Listen live
- Website: foxsportsradionewjersey.com

WCTC (1450 AM "Fox Sports New Jersey") is a commercial radio station broadcasting a sports radio format. Licensed to New Brunswick, New Jersey, the station serves Middlesex, Somerset, and Union counties. The station is owned by Beasley Broadcast Group (through Beasley Media Group, LLC). It is the radio home for Rutgers University athletic events and Somerset Patriots Minor League Baseball games. It is the radio affiliate for New York Knicks basketball and New York Rangers hockey.

WCTC transmits with 1,000 watts, non-directional. It formerly broadcast in C-QUAM AM stereo. The transmitter is off Valentine Street at South 5th Avenue in Highland Park, New Jersey, near the Raritan River. Programming is also heard on 250-watt FM translator W228DY at 93.5 MHz in New Brunswick.

== History ==
WCTC is considered New Jersey's first radio station built during the post-World War II broadcast boom. It signed on December 12, 1946. The following year, it added an FM station, 98.3 WCTC-FM (today WMGQ). WCTC derives its call sign from the Chanticleer, a flamboyant fighting rooster from the medieval fable Reynard the Fox (Le Roman de Renart). It is also used by Geoffrey Chaucer in the Canterbury Tales which was the Rutgers mascot from 1925 to 1955.

From the 1960s through the 1980s, WCTC adopted a full service middle of the road (MOR) format featuring local news, talk, sports, and adult popular music. For most of those years, Jack Ellery was the popular wake-up host.

In 1992, WCTC gave up music programming, switching to talk radio, featuring programming from ABC Radio and Premiere Radio Networks. As of July 2, 2008, WCTC went back to its roots by reverting to an oldies music format.

On February 28, 2011, WCTC changed the format back to talk, launching the local midday show "New Jersey TODAY" hosted by Bert Baron.

On July 19, 2016, Beasley Media Group announced it would acquire Greater Media and its 21 stations (including WCTC) for $240 million. The FCC approved the sale on October 6, and the sale closed on November 1.

Under Beasley ownership, WCTC was the primary source for winter school closing announcements. In later years, WCTC's talk programming included "This Morning, America's First News with Gordon Deal", "Markley, Van Camp & Robbins", Guy Benson, and local host Tommy G. in afternoon drive time. WCTC carried hourly news from NBC News Radio. WCTC also aired special interest shows on the weekends.

In July 2021, WCTC began simulcasting on an FM translator, 93.5 W228DY. On September 26, 2021, the station dropped news/talk for sports as "Fox Sports New Jersey", primarily featuring Fox Sports Radio programming.

== Former on-air staff ==
- Adam Amin
- Gordon Deal, host of Wall Street Journal This Morning once served as a News Anchor at the station. WCTC later carried his syndicated show.
- Jack Ellery
- Herb Kaplow
- Dave Marash
- Bruce Williams, syndicated radio personality. He began his broadcast career at WCTC
