= Effie Neal Jones =

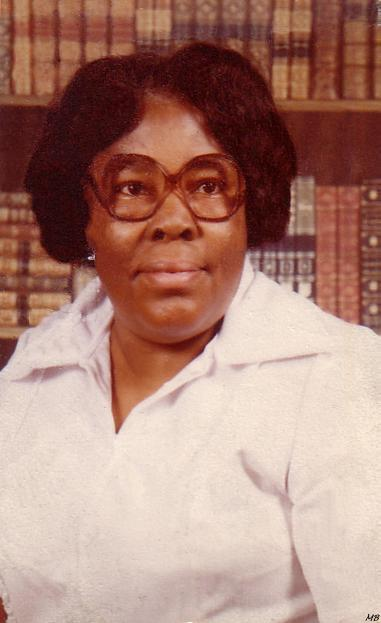
- Born: Effie Neal Bouldin; 15 November 1919; Fairmont, North Carolina, U.S.
- Died: 30 April 2002 (aged 82); Moore Regional Hospital, Pinehurst, North Carolina, U.S.
- Education: Public Schools of Robeson County, North Carolina
- Occupations: Civil Rights Activist, Community Organizer, Food Services Provider and Counselor for the Four County Head Start Program
- Spouse: Forest Jones (Deceased)
- Children: 9

Effie Neal Jones (November 15, 1919 – April 30, 2002) was an American civil rights activist, food services provider, and counselor for the Four County Head Start Program in Laurinburg, North Carolina. In 1940 Mrs. Jones married Mr. Forest Jones, she was the daughter of Colonel and Bertha Bouldin, of Maxton, North Carolina.

== Biography ==
=== Early life and education ===
Mrs. Jones, born in Fairmont, North Carolina, received her education from the Public Schools of Robeson County, North Carolina. A self-made woman, she had very little formal school training. At age 14, she assumed all the motherly duties for her 11 siblings, after their mother's death. Effie and her siblings worked alongside their father as sharecroppers. In 1946 Mrs. Jones, like many other blacks of the time period, was a member of the Great Migration (African American). During the Great Migration of 1916-1930, over one million blacks moved from the south to the north in search of better lives. It is conservatively estimated that 400,000 left the South during the two-year period of 1916-1918 to take advantage of a labor shortage created in the wake of the First World War. Mrs. Jones migrated north to escape racial discrimination, and poverty. She sought employment opportunities and became a source of income for her sharecropper parents and her children. Reluctantly, she commuted between North Carolina and New Jersey to ensure a better life for her family.

Mrs. Jones migrated north to Newark, New Jersey in 1952 and took a job as a live-in housekeeper for a very prominent, liberal doctor. While living in Newark, Mrs. Jones was very active in the Civil Rights Movement. She joined the National Council of Negro Women (NCNW), the Prince Hall Order of the Eastern Star and the United Order of Tents. She helped register black voters and build community organizations that could win a share of political power in the state. In 1964, due to the terminal illness of her father, she took her northern learned wisdom back to the south, to her home state of North Carolina, where she joined a well-known statewide civil rights and political activist, Dr (Rev) H. E. Edwards, a member of Southern Christian Leadership Conference (SCLC), in organizing black community events such as political fund raisers and voter registration drives. Their efforts were met with racist repression from state and local lawmen, White Citizens' Councils, and Ku Klux Klan (KKK) resulting in family harassment, threats, arson and other criminal acts. It was during this time (1968) that she, along with Dr Edwards and others, begin what would be her lifelong endeavor of helping young children.

== Career ==
Mrs. Jones was one of the founding members of the Maxton Four County Community Services, Head Start Program in 1968. Head Start is a program of the United States Department of Health and Human Services that provides comprehensive education, health, nutrition, and parent involvement services to low-income children and their families. Created in 1965 by the Head Start Act, Head Start is the longest-running program to address systemic poverty in the United States. As of late 2005, more than 22 million pre-school aged children have participated in Head Start. She held several positions for the organization such as Food Services Director and Counselor for the Head Start Program; serving the Maxton, North Carolina area, Shiloh Missionary Baptist Church, as well as other local communities. She completely devoted herself to the betterment of the community through the development of each and every child. She championed the rights of women, children, and families regardless of ethnicity, gender, age, or religion. Through that organization she has spearheaded education and mentoring programs. She believed that the culture of poverty and the cycle of poverty could be overcome through education. After her retirement in 1988, she often said that her greatest joy came from seeing her students become successful adults and positive contributors to society.

=== Marriage and children ===
In 1940 Mrs. Jones married Mr. Forest Jones, a decorated US Army World War II veteran and Master Mechanic, she was the mother to nine children, daughter: Rosemary Gordon and sons: Roger Jones, Carlton Bouldin, Perry Jones, Willie Jones, Colonel Jones, George Jones, Patrick Jones, and Michael Barton. Her offspring produced 29 grandchildren, and 37 great grandchildren at the time of her death.

=== Death ===
Effie Neal Jones died on April 30, 2002, at Moore Regional Hospital, Pinehurst, North Carolina of Heart Failure.

== See also ==
- Great Migration

== Bibliography ==
- Effie Jones | Local Activist Dies; The Laurinburg Exchange; 6 May 2002
- Local Civil rights Activist Dies; The Robosonian; 6 May 2002
- William H. Frey, "The New Great Migration: Black Americans' Return to the South, 1965-2000", The Brookings Institution, May 2004, pp. 1–3, accessed 27 Feb 2009
- James Gilbert Cassedy, "African Americans and the American Labor Movement", Prologue', Summer 1997, Vol.29, No.2, accessed 28 Feb 2009
- Glenn Smith "The Post and Courier"; Sunday, November 16, 2008, accessed 28 Feb 2009
- Alma Lynn Bane, "The General Grand Chapter, Order of the Eastern Star", accessed 28 Feb 2009
