= Fairmont Commercial Historic District =

Historic district in North Carolina, United States

- U.S. National Register of Historic Places
- U.S. Historic district
- Location within North Carolina Location within the United States
- Location: Bordered Roughly by Byrd St. on the N., Walnut St. on the E., Red Cross St. on the S., & Alley St. on the W., Fairmont, North Carolina
- Coordinates: 34°29′52″N 79°06′48″W
- Area: 11 acres (4.5 ha)
- Built: 1898
- Architectural style: Modern Movement, Italianate
- NRHP reference No.: 10000163
- Added to NRHP: April 7, 2010

Fairmont Commercial Historic District is a national historic district situated in Fairmont, Robeson County, North Carolina. This district encompasses 31 contributing buildings in the central business district of Fairmont. Constructed between approximately 1898 and 1960, these buildings showcase a variety of popular architectural styles, including Italianate and Modern Movement. Notable buildings include the Rawls Motor Company (1952), McDaniel Hardware (1949, c. 1954), Floyd and Floyd (1960), A. L. Jones Building (1912), Big Brick Warehouse (1931, c. 1940), and Fairmont Depot (1898).

It was added to the National Register of Historic Places in 2010.
