= WMGQ =

- New Brunswick, New Jersey; United States
- Broadcast area: Central New Jersey
- Frequency: 98.3 MHz
- Branding: Magic 98.3

Programming
- Format: Adult contemporary

Ownership
- Owner: Beasley Broadcast Group; (Beasley Media Group Licenses, LLC)
- Sister stations: WCTC; WDHA-FM; WMTR; WJRZ-FM; WRAT

History
- First air date: July 31, 1948
- Former call signs: WCTC-FM (1948–1972); WQMR (1972–1977)
- Call sign meaning: "Magic"

Technical information
- Licensing authority: FCC
- Facility ID: 55179
- Class: A
- ERP: 1,200 watts
- HAAT: 158 meters (518 ft)
- Transmitter coordinates: 40.477°N 74.492°W

Links
- Public license information: Public file; LMS
- Website: magic983.com

WMGQ (98.3 MHz Magic 98.3) is a commercial FM radio station licensed to New Brunswick and serving Central Jersey (Middlesex, Union and Somerset Counties). It is owned by the Beasley Broadcast Group, along with sister station WCTC. It broadcasts an adult contemporary radio format, switching to Christmas music for much of November and December. The slogan is "Today's Hits, Yesterday's Favorites".

WMGQ has an effective radiated power (ERP) of 1,200 watts. The transmitter is on Veronica Avenue near Somerset Street (New Jersey Route 27) in Franklin Township.

== History ==
The station began as WCTC-FM, signing on the air on July 31, 1948, and began full operations in September 1948. Initially it simulcast its AM sister station WCTC (1450 AM), which went on the air two years earlier. In the 1970s, it aired a beautiful music format. The call sign was changed to WQMR on February 28, 1972, and to WMGQ on February 14, 1977.

In the 1980s, Greater Media, its owner, began switching a number of its FM stations to "Beautiful Rock", a soft rock format from TM Studios. It featured artists such as Carole King, Cat Stevens, Carly Simon, Stevie Wonder and James Taylor. The stations were all called "Magic" and included WMGK in Philadelphia, WMJC in Detroit and WMGQ.

By the 1990s, WMGQ moved to a more mainstream adult contemporary sound, but still calling itself "Magic 98.3". From 2005 to 2009, WMGQ played Christmas music beginning on November 20 to the day after Christmas. Since then, Magic 98.3 has switched to all Christmas music in mid-November.

On July 19, 2016, Beasley Media Group announced it would acquire Greater Media and its 21 stations, including WMGQ and WCTC, for $240 million. The FCC approved the sale on October 6, and the sale closed on November 1.
