= WJRZ-FM =

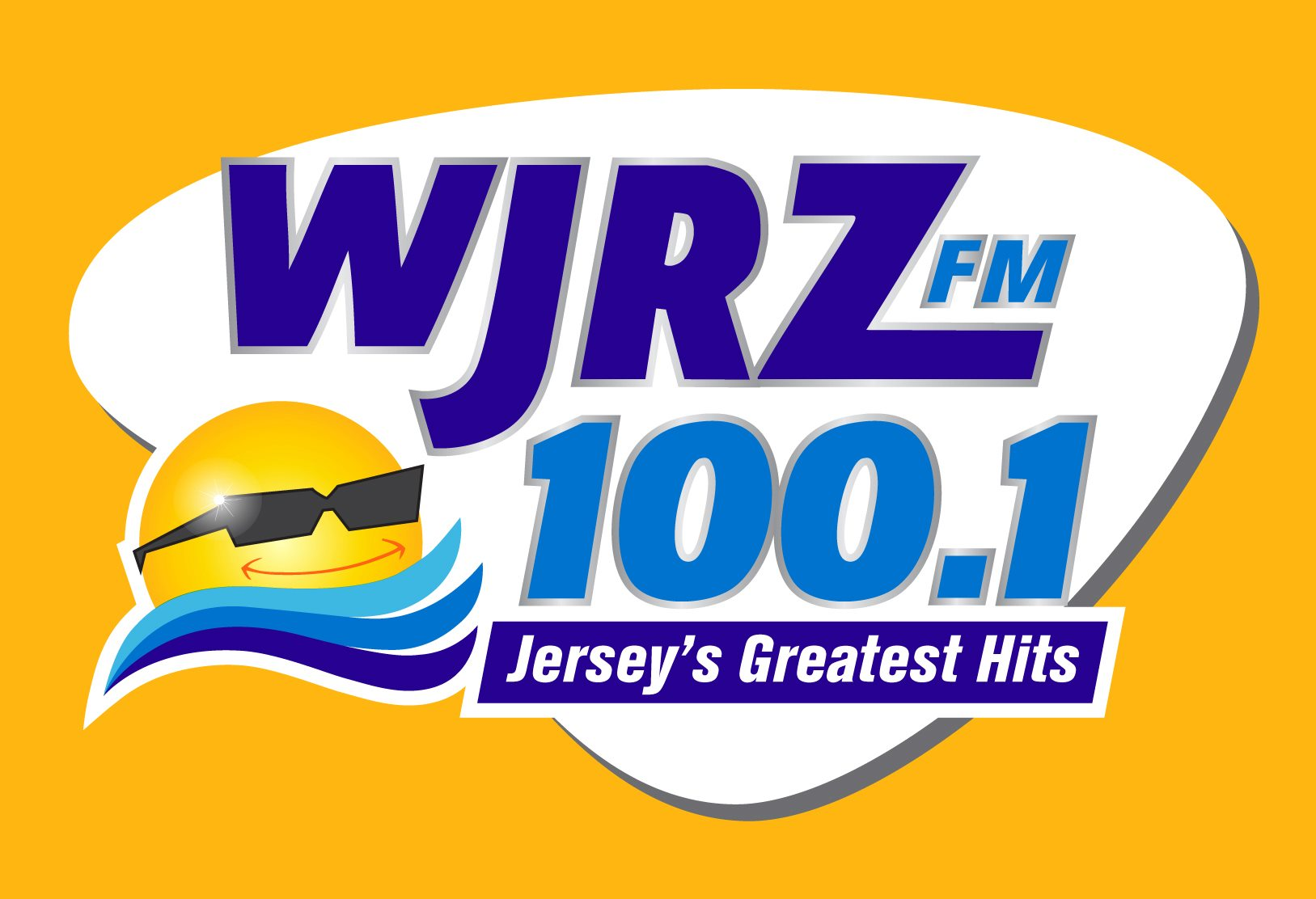
- Manahawkin, New Jersey; United States
- Broadcast area: Toms River, New Jersey
- Frequency: 100.1 MHz (HD Radio)
- Branding: 100.1 WJRZ

Programming
- Format: Classic hits
- Subchannels: HD2: WRAT simulcast (Mainstream rock); HD3: Fox Sports Radio Jersey Shore (Sports radio)

Ownership
- Owner: Beasley Broadcast Group; (Beasley Media Group Licenses, LLC)
- Sister stations: WRAT, WMTR, WDHA-FM, WCTC, WMGQ

History
- First air date: July 4, 1976; 49 years ago
- Call sign meaning: New Jersey (Z substitutes last syllable)

Technical information
- Licensing authority: FCC
- Facility ID: 31078
- Class: A
- ERP: 1,700 watts
- HAAT: 133 meters (436 ft)
- Translator: See § Translators

Links
- Public license information: Public file; LMS
- Webcast: Listen live Listen Live via iHeart
- Website: www.wjrz.com

WJRZ-FM (100.1 MHz, "100.1 WJRZ") is a commercial radio station licensed to serve Manahawkin, New Jersey. The station is owned by Beasley Broadcast Group through licensee Beasley Media Group, LLC, and broadcasts a classic hits format. The station's studios are located on Beach Avenue in Stafford Township and its broadcast tower is located in Waretown, New Jersey at (39°47′54.0″N 74°12′9.0″W).

== History ==
WJRZ began broadcasting on July 4, 1976, from Manahawkin, New Jersey with a Top 40 format that also played a lot of recurrents, and the first song played was "More, More, More" by Andrea True Connection. The original city of license was Ship Bottom, later changed to Manahawkin, and used the ID "Manahawkin-Toms River". Some of the early slogans used were "Stereo 100 WJRZ", "FM 100 WJRZ", and as "HitRadio Power 100 WJRZ". The station was originally licensed to the Jersey Shore Broadcasting Corporation, which was incorporated in New Jersey in 1974, with Joseph J. Knox Jr., president and Brent McNally, VP as founders. The station signed on as an affiliate of the ABC Radio Network and later switched to AP Radio. From its sign-on the station grew its listenership very quickly. WJRZ has had a long history of talented music hosts and newscasters. They include (1970s) Jason "Big Jay" Sorensen, Jay Lurie, Brent McNally, Bob Sorrentino, Terry Byrnes, Joe Stephens, Ron Stevens, Lance DeBock, Mike Brophy, A.J. Brooks, Arthur Sarnovsky, Chuck Flamini, Karyn Westhoven, Chris VanZant, Spyder McGuire, Dan Turi and many others.

The station maintained studios and a 340 ft (100 m) tower on 16 acres (6.5 ha) on Beach Avenue in Manahawkin, next to AT&T High Seas Radio Station WOO. The transmitter was later moved to a 500 ft (150 m) tower on 20 acres (8.1 ha) off Route 9 in Waretown.

The CHR/Hot AC format continued until November 1991, when WJRZ moved to a classic hits format, but went back to CHR by the middle of 1992. In December 1998, WJRZ dropped Hot AC in favor of country as "Jersey Shore Country." The country format had a mixed reaction from area listeners and failed to attract a significant number of listeners.

In June 2000, they switched to oldies and rebranded as "Oldies 100," and in 2002 ownership changed to Greater Media.

WJRZ-FM started broadcasting using HD Radio in November 2007. WJRZ-FM's HD2 subchannel was to be "Classic Oldies," however a launch date had not been established at that time.

WJRZ-FM re-branded as "100.1 WJRZ - The Greatest Hits Of the '60s & '70s" in early 2008, simply using "Jersey's Greatest Hits" and dropping all pre-Beatles music except for Saturday and Sunday nights. The station dropped one of its signature programs- Jukebox Saturday Night with Joe Stephens in June 2009.

For Christmas 2009, WJRZ-FM flipped to an all-Christmas playlist on Friday, November 6, 2009.

On December 14, 2009, most of the on-air personnel at WJRZ-FM were dismissed and on December 15, WJRZ-FM started airing commercials between the Christmas songs announcing their new format. In each of the commercials, they were playing the type of songs typically heard in that type of format. On December 26, 2009, 100.1 WJRZ-FM became Magic 100.1 "Today's Best Variety" similar to Greater Media's sister station WMGQ; an adult contemporary format from New Brunswick, NJ which is also programmed by WJRZ-FM's OM/PD Jeff Rafter. It was not, however, a direct simulcast. The stations shared similar personalities who voicetracked their shows on the WJRZ-FM signal (mornings with Chris McCoy and mid-days with Debbie Mazella).

In 2010, Jeff Rafter was relieved of his duties at WJRZ-FM. He remained OM/PD at WMGQ for a time before heading over to competitor Press Comm 107.1 The Boss. Glenn Kalina took over the OM/PD role and became host of the station's new local morning show.

On April 22, 2013, at 6 am, after the last song played on Magic 100.1, We Are Never Ever Getting Back Together By Taylor Swift, WJRZ-FM flipped back to their classic hits format carried from 2000 to 2009 as WJRZ 100.1: Jersey's Greatest Hits. The new station launched with "Here Comes the Sun" by the Beatles followed by "The Boys are Back in Town" by Thin Lizzy.

On January 6, 2015, longtime Program Director/Afternoon host Glenn Kalina announced his resignation of the positions and retirement from full-time radio. Assistant Program Director Matt Knight was elevated to Program Director/Afternoons, while TJ Bryan filled the Assistant Program Director/Mornings role. Glenn continued to host "The Beatles: From Us To You" on Sunday mornings with Beatles authority Richie V.

On July 19, 2016, Beasley Media Group announced it would acquire Greater Media and its 21 stations (including WJRZ) for $240 million. The FCC approved the sale on October 6, and the sale closed on November 1.

== Translators ==
Call sign	Frequency	City of license	FID	ERP (W)	HAAT	Class	FCC info	Notes
W263DA	100.5 FM	Toms River, New Jersey	77770	250	80 m (262 ft)	D	LMS	Fox Sports Radio Jersey Shore
W300AO	107.9 FM	Manahawkin, New Jersey	77769	250	97.4 m (320 ft)	D	LMS	Relays WJRZ-HD2 (simulcasts WRAT)
