= Herb Kaplow =

American television news correspondent (1927–2013)

- Born: Herbert Elias Kaplow; February 2, 1927; Manhattan, New York, United States
- Died: July 27, 2013 (aged 86); Arlington, Virginia, United States
- Education: Northwestern University
- Occupation: Television news correspondent
- Years active: 1951–1994
- Employer(s): NBC News; ABC News
- Known for: News coverage of: Cuban Revolution (1953–1959); U.S. Supreme Court's Brown v. Board of Education ruling (1954); NASA's Project Mercury (1959–1963); Richard Nixon's presidential nomination (1968)
- Spouse: Betty Rae Kaplow
- Children: 3

Herbert Elias Kaplow (February 2, 1927 – July 27, 2013) was an American television news correspondent. His main focus was reporting out of Washington, D.C., covering presidential campaigns and those who were elected.

== Early years ==
Kaplow was born in 1927 in Manhattan to Jewish immigrants from Europe. He was raised in Queens and attended Queens College, before being drafted into the United States Army. He was later assigned to the Armed Forces Radio Service, where he read scripts covering the Nuremberg Trials as well as covered a Wimbledon tennis championship. After his military discharge, he returned to get a degree in history at Queens College. He went on to earn a master's degree from the Medill School of Journalism at Northwestern University, after a two-year radio announcer job at WCTC in New Brunswick, New Jersey.

== National news career ==
After obtaining his degree, he moved to Washington, D.C., to work for NBC's radio affiliate WRC, before taking an editing job on the network's News of the World program. A few years later, he became an NBC news correspondent for radio and television. In 1968, he became a White House correspondent. In 1972, he switched to ABC News, where he remained until his retirement in 1994.

=== Notable news stories ===
During his four decades of covering news stories, which included 10 presidential campaigns and 19 nominating conventions, Kaplow also reported on major events of the civil rights movement from the U.S. Supreme Court's 1954 Brown v. Board of Education ruling to desegregate schools to the Freedom Riders's struggle to integrate buses in the early 1960s. Kaplow also covered NASA's Project Mercury.

He covered the Cuban Revolution that culminated in the victory of communists led by Fidel Castro in 1959. After the failed 1961 Bay of Pigs Invasion of Cuba by American-backed Cuban exiles, Kaplow was the first American reporter to interview Castro.

Kaplow also covered Richard Nixon from 1958 to 1968. This kept Nixon in the public eye, which historian Erik Barnouw believed helped Nixon win the 1968 presidential nomination.

== Personal life ==
After retiring in 1994, Kaplow lived in Falls Church, Virginia, with his wife, Betty. They had three sons: Steven, Bobby and Larry. Herb spent an undisclosed amount of time in an assisted living facility, battling dementia, which affected his ability to speak. He died on July 27, 2013, from a stroke in Arlington, Virginia, at the age of 86.
