= WSTS =

- Fairmont, North Carolina; United States
- Frequency: 100.9 MHz
- Branding: 100.9 The Cross

Programming
- Format: Southern Gospel

Ownership
- Owner: Stuart Epperson, Jr.; (Truth Broadcasting Corporation)
- Sister stations: WFMO, WTSB

History
- First air date: 1975
- Call sign meaning: Winning Souls Through Song

Technical information
- Licensing authority: FCC
- Facility ID: 53608
- Class: C2
- ERP: 50,000 watts
- HAAT: 149 meters
- Transmitter coordinates: 34°16′17″N 78°56′24″W

Links
- Public license information: Public file; LMS
- Webcast: WSTS on Truth Network
- Website: The Cross Radio

WSTS (100.9 FM) is a radio station broadcasting a southern gospel format. Licensed to Fairmont, North Carolina, United States, the station is currently owned by Stuart Epperson, Jr., through licensee Truth Broadcasting Corporation.

== History ==
Jim Clark's Pro-Media Inc. owned WSTS and WFMO in 1998.

WSTS and WFMO were sold by Davidson Media Group to Truth Broadcasting Corporation effective April 14, 2015, at a price of $475,000.
