= WAZZ =

Fayetteville, North Carolina; United States
- Broadcast area: Fayetteville metropolitan area, North Carolina
- Frequency: 1490 kHz
- Branding: My Kiss Radio 93.5

Programming
- Languages: English
- Format: Contemporary hit radio
- Affiliations: Westwood One

Ownership
- Owner: Beasley Media Group, LLC.; (Beasley Media Group Licenses, LLC)
- Sister stations: WFLB, WKML, WUKS, WZFX

History
- First air date: February 18, 1948; 77 years ago
- Former call signs: WFLB (1948–1997)
- Call sign meaning: Jazz

Technical information
- Licensing authority: FCC
- Facility ID: 72058
- Class: C
- Power: 1,000 watts (unlimited)
- Transmitter coordinates: 35.466°N 78.548°W
- Translator(s): 93.5 W228DK (Fayetteville)

Links
- Public license information: Public file; LMS
- Website: mykissradio.com

WAZZ (1490 AM, "My Kiss Radio 93.5") is a Contemporary hit radio station in Fayetteville, North Carolina, owned by Beasley Media Group, LLC. Its studios and transmitter are located separately in Fayetteville.

== History ==
WFLB signed on the air on February 18, 1948, with John M. Croft as general manager. WFLB was a commercial radio station in Fayetteville, North Carolina. Significant local programs produced by the station included 3-B Time, with disc jockey Bill Bowser, in 1948.

In the 1950s, the station signed on a TV outlet, WFLB-TV 18, which folded later in the 1950s.

Starting in the mid-1950s, WFLB played what was called Top 40.

Newsman Johnny Joyce was the leading radio news anchor in Fayetteville. He worked at WFLB (AM) until the late 1970s where he joined WFAI (AM).

In the late 1970s, WFLB (AM) was a top 40 powerhouse in Fayetteville, North Carolina radio market. The station featured on air personalities Larry "Records" Cannon, Andy "Stonewall" Jackson, Debbi Tanna, John Braxton and Mark McKay. Mark McKay currently is 25-year veteran sports anchor for CNN.

In 1991, station owners Henry Hoot and Rev. Gardner Altman also owned WFAI, which began playing traditional gospel artists such as Shirley Caesar, Willie Neal Johnson and The Gospel Keynotes, and the Rev. James Cleveland, while WFLB would play The Kingsmen, Chuck Wagon Gang and The Bishops.

WFLB switched to adult standards in December 1994.

On August 1, 1996, WFLB went off the air when Beasley Broadcast Group bought WFLB along with WAZZ and WEWO.

WFLB ("The Memories Station") returned to the air in February 1997, with Curt Nunnery bringing back "Curt's Coffee Club," which he had hosted for more than 30 years on WFAI. He was station manager on WFLB before 1994.

Soon after that in 1997, WFLB swapped call signs with WAZZ.

On October 9, 2014, WAZZ changed their format to soft adult contemporary, branded as "Sunny 94.3" (also broadcast on FM translator W232CI 94.3 FM Fayetteville).

On January 5, 2018, WAZZ changed formats back to top 40 CHR, branded as "My Kiss Radio" (which simulcasts on a translator on 93.5 FM).

On Monday May 8, 2023, Ronnie Glover took over as the VP/Market Manager for WAZZ.
