= WTSB =

- Selma, North Carolina; United States
- Broadcast area: Raleigh-Durham
- Frequency: 1090 kHz

Programming
- Format: Full service southern gospel
- Affiliations: North Carolina News Network

Ownership
- Owner: Truth Broadcasting Corporation
- Sister stations: WSTS

History
- First air date: August 4, 1964
- Former call signs: WBZB (1964–2004)
- Call sign meaning: "Where Tobacco Sells Best"

Technical information
- Licensing authority: FCC
- Facility ID: 71088
- Class: D
- Power: 9,000 watts days only; 1,700 watts critical hours
- Transmitter coordinates: 35°36′57.00″N 78°24′33.00″W
- Translator: 105.5 W288DH (Selma)

Links
- Public license information: Public file; LMS
- Webcast: Listen live
- Website: truthnetwork.com/stations/wtsb/

WTSB (1090 AM) is a commercial radio station licensed to Selma, North Carolina, United States, and serving the Raleigh-Durham area during the daytime hours only. Owned by Truth Broadcasting Corporation, it broadcasts a full service, Southern gospel format, with local news, information and high school sports, as well as reports from the North Carolina News Network.

WTSB also heard around the clock over low-power FM translator W288DH at 105.5 MHz.

== History of WTSB, Lumberton ==
An earlier station with the WTSB call sign was located on 580 AM in Lumberton, North Carolina, and broadcast at 500 watts during the day and 50 watts at night in 2000. The station signed on in 1947, owned by Robeson Broadcasting Corp. Jack Pait, who had a furniture business in Lumberton, was majority stockholder. Levi E. Willis Sr., president and owner of Willis Broadcasting of Norfolk, Virginia, bought WTSB in 1997 from Beasley Broadcast Group which had bought WTSB and WKML. Both stations aired country music for a year when they were co-owned, but WTSB ended up going off the air for a while. Willis played traditional black gospel until WTSB went off the air in 2000. Though Willis believed the station could return, it did not.

== History of WBZB, Selma/Garner ==
Prior to 1999, WBZB aired country music along with conservative talk. The former owner walked into Bass Music Enterprises, owned by Steve Bass, and asked, "Wanna buy a radio station?"

In 2002, about two years after Bass became the primary owner of WBZB, the station was located in Garner and played anything and everything by North Carolina musicians or well-known musicians from neighboring states. The playlist included about 1,700 songs. Artists included Arrogance, Nancy Middleton, Blue Dust Box, Jam Pain Society, John Saylor, and Tift Merritt. In 2003, Shane Gentry, a nudist and member of Nekkid Monday (a band similar to ZZ Top), began hosting the Naked Monday Show, celebrating the nudist lifestyle.

WBZB received approval for a power increase from 800 to 1,600 watts, but after a year, even though Bass claimed the station was close to making money, his investors were unable to stay with him. He sold the station on eBay.

Triangle Sports Broadcasters bought WBZB and changed the letters to WTSB, also increasing the signal to 9,000 watts, and switched to sports talk July 12, 2004, calling the station "Your Triangle Sports Ticket". The programming included local hosts as well as ESPN Radio.

WTSB was sold to Lamm Media Group in November 2007. LMG head Carl Lamm retired in 2019 and sold it to the religious broadcasting group Truth Broadcasting in 2019. Truth Broadcasting acquired the station facilities and an FM translator for $175,000 in July the same year.

== Programming ==
WTSB runs a full-service variety format, including local news and tradio, with much of its programming sold to radio evangelists. Reruns of Lum and Abner air every weekday on the station.

== Translator ==
WTSB 1090 AM is a daytime-only signal, but programming can be heard 24/7 on 105.5 FM as well as online.

Call sign	Frequency	City of license	FID	ERP (W)	HAAT	Class	FCC info
W288DH	(105.5 FM) FM	Selma, North Carolina	156969	99 watts	60.0 m (197 ft)	D	LMS
