= WKML =

Lumberton, North Carolina; United States
- Broadcast area: Fayetteville, North Carolina
- Frequency: 95.7 MHz (HD Radio)
- Branding: "The Big 95-7 WKML"

Programming
- Format: Country
- Subchannels: HD2: Country "NuTune Country"

Ownership
- Owner: Beasley Broadcast Group, Inc.; (Beasley Media Group Licenses, LLC)
- Sister stations: WAZZ; WFLB; WUKS; WZFX

History
- First air date: December 1, 1960 (as WTSB-FM)
- Former call signs: WTSB-FM (1960–1979); WGSS (1979–1985)

Technical information
- Licensing authority: FCC
- Facility ID: 37252
- Class: C0
- ERP: 100,000 watts
- HAAT: 318 meters (1,043 ft)
- Transmitter coordinates: 34°46′49.6″N 79°2′44.1″W

Links
- Public license information: Public file; LMS
- Webcast: Listen live
- Website: www.wkml.com

WKML (95.7 FM) is a radio station broadcasting a country music format. Licensed to Lumberton, North Carolina, United States, it serves the Fayetteville area. The station is currently owned by Beasley Media Group, LLC., through licensee Beasley Media Group Licenses, LLC. Its studios are located east of downtown Fayetteville, and its transmitter is located west of St. Pauls, North Carolina.

== History ==
The station signed on as WTSB-FM on Dec. 1, 1960, mostly simulcasting sister station WTSB. With only 6,500 watts, the station focused solely on the Lumberton area. The call letters were changed to WGSS in July 1979 with the station carrying an MOR format. In 1985, the format was changed to country with new call letters WKML. Soon after, the station increased power to 100,000 watts to cover the Fayetteville market. WKML debuted in the Fayetteville ratings in 1986 with a 10.8 share and it has frequently been at or near the top of the ratings since.
