= Joy J. Johnson =

American politician (died 1996)

Joy Joseph Johnson
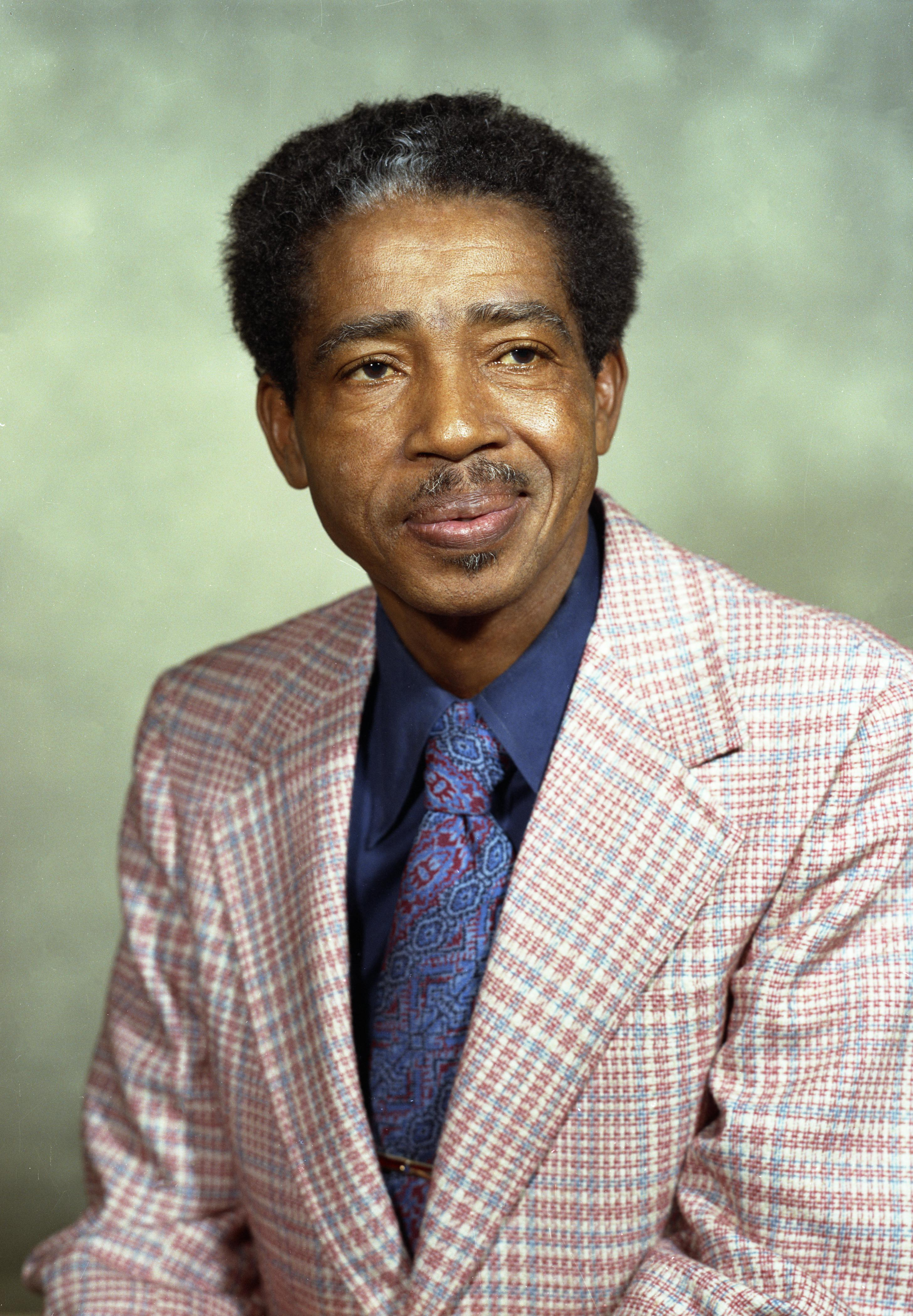

Member of the North Carolina House of Representatives
- In office 1971–1979

Personal details
- Born: Laurel Hill, NC
- Died: December 30, 1996
- Occupation: Baptist Minister

Rev. Joy Joseph Johnson (died December 30, 1996) was an African-American Baptist minister and politician from North Carolina. Johnson was the second African-American member of the North Carolina House of Representatives since the passage of the Voting Rights Act. Johnson followed Rep. Henry E. Frye and served from 1971 to 1979. He was the ninth pastor of the First Baptist Church in Fairmont, North Carolina. He represented Robeson County, North Carolina in the House of Representatives.
