= WPYB =

- Benson, North Carolina; United States
- Broadcast area: Eastern North Carolina
- Frequency: 1130 kHz
- Branding: WPYB Country

Programming
- Format: Classic country
- Affiliations: SRN News

Ownership
- Owner: Henry McLamb, Jr. and Henry McLamb, Sr.; (McLamb Broadcasting)

History
- First air date: 1962
- Call sign meaning: We Promote Your Business

Technical information
- Licensing authority: FCC
- Facility ID: 4774
- Class: D
- Power: 6,500 watts day 1,000 watts critical hours
- Transmitter coordinates: 35°21′39.6″N 78°34′08.00″W

Links
- Public license information: Public file; LMS
- Webcast: Listen Live
- Website: wpybcountry.com

WPYB (1130 AM) is a radio station in Benson, North Carolina—a small town between Raleigh and Fayetteville—that has a classic country music format.

WPYB was the first station that was owned by George G. Beasley, the founder of Beasley Broadcast Group. Beasley founded the station to cater to the black community in the Benson area, inspired by his commitment to provide a "voice for the voiceless" in his local community.

WPYB operates only during daylight hours to accommodate the signal of WBBR in New York City.

According to a listing in the SRDS Radio Advertising Source, Spring/Summer 2007, WPYB billed itself as "the best little station in the nation".

On April 29, 2021, WPYB was sold to McLamb Broadcasting for US$190,000.
