= WUKS =

- St. Pauls, North Carolina; United States
- Broadcast area: Fayetteville, North Carolina
- Frequency: 107.7 MHz
- Branding: 107.7 The Bounce

Programming
- Format: Classic hip hop

Ownership
- Owner: Beasley Broadcast Group, Inc.; (Beasley Media Group Licenses, LLC)
- Sister stations: WAZZ, WFLB, WKML, WZFX

History
- First air date: 1997
- Former call signs: WLRD (1994–1997)
- Call sign meaning: W U KiSs (previous branding)

Technical information
- Licensing authority: FCC
- Facility ID: 39239
- Class: C3
- ERP: 5,200 watts
- HAAT: 200 meters (660 ft)
- Transmitter coordinates: 34°52′17″N 79°08′49″W

Links
- Public license information: Public file; LMS
- Webcast: Listen live
- Website: 1077thebounce.com

WUKS (107.7 FM) is a radio station broadcasting a classic hip hop format. Licensed to St. Pauls, North Carolina, United States, the station serves the Fayetteville area. The station is currently owned by Beasley Media Group, through licensee Beasley Media Group Licenses, LLC, and features programming from ABC Radio. Its studios are located east of downtown Fayetteville, and its transmitter is located west of Lumber Bridge, North Carolina.

== History ==
On October 14, 1994, Lumbee Regional Development Association, owner of gospel station WYRU in Red Springs, added a 6,500-watt FM station called WLRD. With 100,000-watt WZFX the only urban contemporary station in the Fayetteville market since 1990, "The Flava" would play the hottest new artists mixed with old school.

By the spring of 1997, WLRD ranked third, behind WZFX and WKML, in the Arbitron ratings. Later that year, Beasley Media Group purchased WYRU and WLRD from Lumbee Regional Development Association for about $1.2 million. The company had also purchased WZFX, and briefly aired that station's programming on WLRD.

"Kiss" logo

On August 11, 1997, WLRD became Kiss 107.7, playing a more adult version of urban contemporary known as "The Touch," with artists such as Al Green, Whitney Houston, Patti LaBelle, and Earth, Wind and Fire. The station changed its call letters to WUKS, increased its power to 25,000 watts, and added Tom Joyner in the mornings. Later, Kiss added live DJs and, for a while, moved in an adult contemporary direction with George Michael, Dave Koz, The Temptations, Bobby Womack, The Chi-Lites, Babyface, and Kenny G.

In the spring of 2008, midday host Omega Jones, and afternoon host Jae McKrae, and Calvin P in the evening held their positions respectively. In the fall of 2008, WUKS was ranked #2 overall in the market with 8.5 percent of listeners. That was the first time since 1986 a station other than Foxy 99 or WKML hit the number 2 mark. That successful trio lasted about a year, until February 2009. The station slipped to fourth with 7.6 the next year. The March 2009 debut of similarly formatted WMGU likely played a role in the station's continuous decline to eighth, at 4.3, in the spring of 2010; WMGU was fourth.

By early 2010, Taylor Morgan and Calvin P were holding down midday and afternoon drive.

At 10:00 am on September 8, 2010, an announcement was made (from afternoon announcer Calvin P) in a variation of this: "As always we thank you, our loyal listeners, for listening to WUKS-FM, St. Pauls, Fayetteville over the years. But as you know, things must change. Now, we must kiss and say goodbye." The final song on 107.7 Kiss FM was The Manhattans' "Kiss and Say Goodbye". Following this track, another announcement was made stating the switch from Kiss FM to 107.7 Jackson FM. The station began playing music from the Jackson family, with the first song being "Thriller" by Michael Jackson.

"Jamz" logo with the "Old School" branding

The Jackson format was a stunt. On Friday, September 10, WUKS resumed under what reports called an "urban variety" format, using the name "107.7 Jamz... Everything that jamz." Beasley said the new sound "targets men and women, ages 25 to 54, with a blend of rhythm-and-blues, funk and early hip-hop from the 1970s to today's hits." Beasley market manager Mac Edwards said listeners indicated they wanted more energy and more of the songs they danced to when younger.

Kenny J was the Program Director and midday drive personality. The Big Teddy Bear has a live and local afternoon drive show. Kent Dunn is the current market manager.

On April 1, 2021, WUKS shifted their format to current-based urban adult contemporary, branded as "107.7 Jamz" with "Smooth R&B and Old School". Big Teddy Bear moved to nights and Kenny J took the afternoon shift. The "Deja Vu" show from ABC Audio airs middays, and Russ Parr in the morning.

On March 20, 2023 at Midnight, after playing "Boom Boom Pow" by The Black Eyed Peas, the station shifted to classic hip hop as "107.7 The Bounce", utilizing a branding made famous by cross-country sister station WMGC-FM in Detroit. The first song on The Bounce was "I Need Love" by LL Cool J. The previous format ranked fifth in the Fayetteville market with a 5.0 share in the Fall 2022 Nielsen Audio ratings, but trailing co-owned WZFX with its 13.7 share and Cumulus Media’s competing WMGU’s second ranked 10.3 share.
