= WRAT =

Rock radio station in Point Pleasant, New Jersey

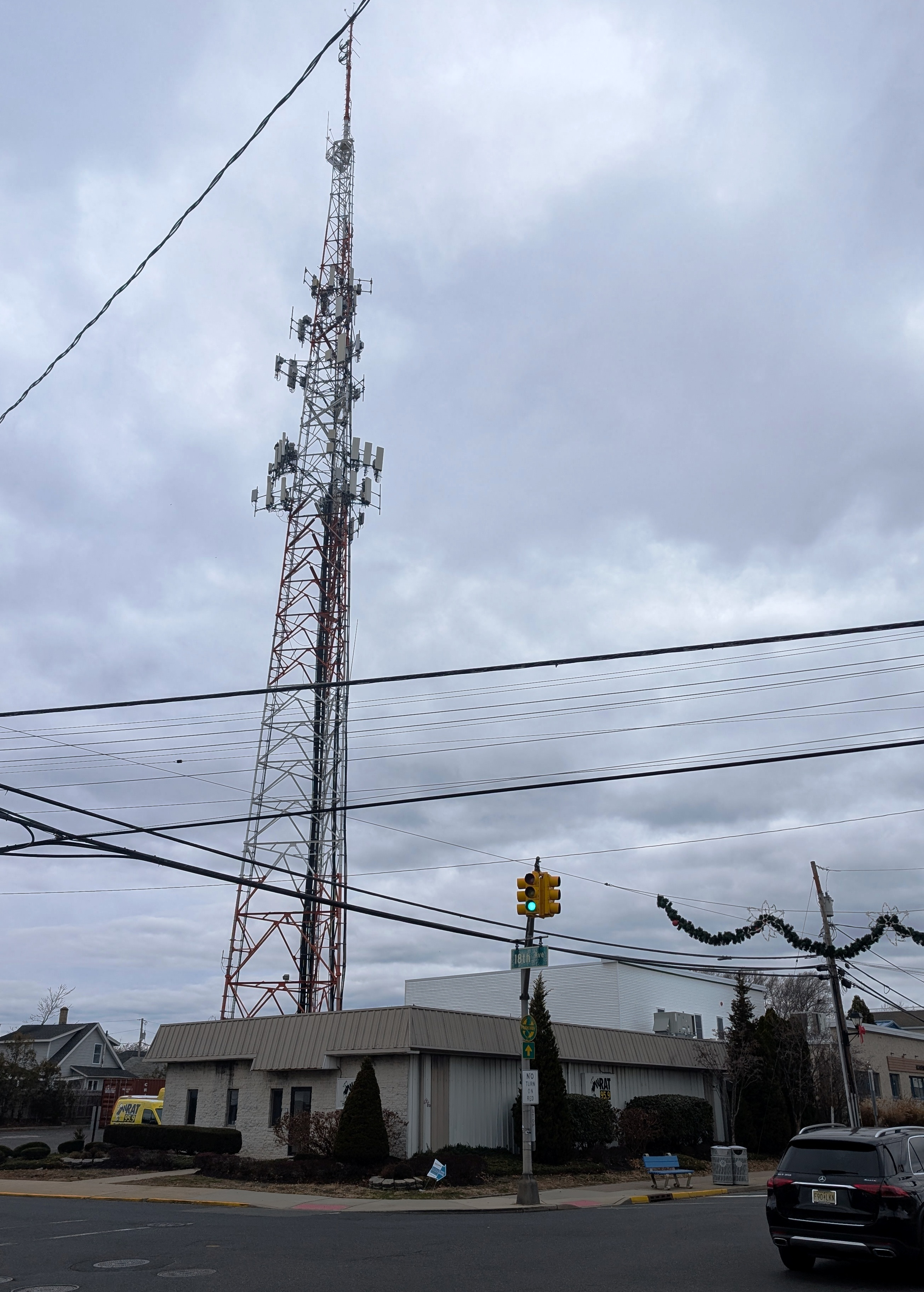
- Studio and transmitter in Lake Como
- Point Pleasant, New Jersey; United States
- Broadcast area: Ocean County–Monmouth County, New Jersey
- Frequency: 95.9 MHz (HD Radio)
- Branding: 95.9 The Rat

Programming
- Format: Mainstream rock
- Subchannels: HD2: WJRZ-FM simulcast (classic hits); HD3: Fox Sports Radio Jersey Shore (sports radio)

Ownership
- Owner: Beasley Broadcast Group; (Beasley Media Group Licenses, LLC)
- Sister stations: WJRZ-FM; WMTR; WDHA-FM; WCTC; WMGQ

History
- First air date: October 4, 1968; 57 years ago
- Former call signs: WADB (1968–1996)
- Call sign meaning: Rat (station uses a rat as its mascot.)

Technical information
- Licensing authority: FCC
- Facility ID: 59530
- Class: A
- ERP: 4,000 watts (analog); 400 watts (digital)
- HAAT: 73 meters (240 ft)
- Transmitter coordinates: 40°10′15.4″N 74°01′40.5″W
- Translators: 107.9 W300AO (Manahawkin, relays WJRZ-HD2)
- Repeater: (100.1-2) WJRZ-HD2 (Manahawkin)

Links
- Public license information: Public file; LMS
- Webcast: Listen live
- Website: wrat.com

WRAT (95.9 FM, "95.9 The Rat") is a commercial radio station licensed to serve Point Pleasant, New Jersey. The station is owned by Beasley Broadcast Group through licensee Beasley Media Group Licenses, LLC. It airs a mainstream rock radio format. The station's studios, offices and transmitter are located on Main Street at 18th Avenue in the Borough of Lake Como, New Jersey.

WRAT has an effective radiated power (ERP) of 4,000 watts analog and 400 watts digital. It broadcasts using HD Radio. The station's programming is simulcast on the HD2 subchannel of sister station WJRZ-FM, which feeds FM translator W300AO in Manahawkin, New Jersey, on 107.9 MHz.

== History ==
=== WADB ===
On October 4, 1968, the station first signed on the air as WADB. It was a beautiful music station, owned by Pleasant Broadcasters, named after the city of license, Point Pleasant, New Jersey. The station played quarter-hour sweeps of instrumental cover versions of popular songs and Broadway showtunes. The studios were on F Street in South Belmar. (The neighborhood is now known as Lake Como.) The station's call sign used the initials of its founder, Adamant Brown and his wife Dorothy.

WADB made use of early automation equipment for radio stations. Large carousels loaded with broadcast-spec tape cartridges were used for the majority of advertising messages. Large reels of taped music with cues to play the commercials allowed the station to run with minimal involvement from the staff. An SMC digital programmer controlled the operation. The station's easy listening format was broadcast in Southern Monmouth and Northern Ocean Counties.

=== WRAT ===
A group of investors, known as the New Jersey Broadcast Partners, acquired the station in 1996. After a Labor Day Weekend stunt during which the song "Rat in Mi Kitchen" by UB40 was aired continuously, WADB flipped to an active rock format on Labor Day Monday, 1996. The call sign switched to WRAT. The first song was AC/DC's "For Those About To Rock (We Salute You)".

=== Greater Media ownership ===
In 2001, the station was acquired by Greater Media, a large national owner with its headquarters in Massachusetts.

WRAT was among the first radio stations in the market to carry its radio broadcasts over its internet website. The station started streaming to allow listeners in fringe areas to get the station online.

On March 9, 2014, WRAT extended its coverage to include southern and central Ocean County by adding a 250-watt FM translator at 107.9 FM. W300AO transmits from a 300-foot tower on Beach Avenue in Manahawkin, New Jersey. The 107.9 signal covers Long Beach Island, Tuckerton, Beach Haven, Barnegat and Manahawkin. Its coverage is limited to the west by co-channel 107.9 WPPZ in Pennsauken, New Jersey.

=== Beasley ownership ===
On July 19, 2016, Beasley Media Group announced it would acquire Greater Media and its 21 stations (including WRAT) for $240 million. It was also at this time WRAT joined the iHeartRadio streaming service.

The Federal Communications Commission approved the sale on October 6, and the sale closed on November 1.
