= WMTR (AM) =

Oldies radio station in Morristown, New Jersey, United States

Coordinates: 40°48′47.4″N 74°27′44.6″W

- Morristown, New Jersey; United States
- Broadcast area: North Jersey
- Frequency: 1250 kHz
- Branding: Classic Oldies WMTR

Programming
- Format: Oldies
- Affiliations: New York Knicks; New York Rangers

Ownership
- Owner: Beasley Broadcast Group; (Beasley Media Group Licenses, LLC)
- Sister stations: WCTC, WDHA-FM, WJRZ-FM, WMGQ, WRAT

History
- First air date: December 12, 1948; 77 years ago
- Call sign meaning: Morristown Radio

Technical information
- Licensing authority: FCC
- Facility ID: 49586
- Class: B
- Power: 5,000 watts (day); 7,000 watts (night)

Links
- Public license information: Public file; LMS
- Website: wmtram.com

WMTR (1250 kHz) is an American AM radio station owned by Beasley Broadcast Group. It is licensed to Morristown, New Jersey and serves Morris County and surrounding areas.

== History ==
WMTR has a long history. On December 12, 1948, WMTR signed on, owned by the Croy family and known as the Morristown Broadcasting Company with studios at 10 Park Place. The station had a general entertainment format running various radio shows along with playing soft popular music of the day. The station was an AM daytimer only allowed on the air from dawn to dusk.

By the late 1950s, the station played music and had a lot of news and information full-time. The Croys though hated rock and roll music so WMTR only played easy listening and some big bands. In the 1960s, WMTR continued on as a Middle-of-the-Road Music station playing no baby boomer popular music. WMTR was still a daytime-only station, signing off with Kate Smith's "Bless This House", instead of the usual "Star Spangled Banner."

In the 1960s a new studio building was constructed at the transmitter site on Horse Hill Road in Cedar Knolls, now shared with co-owned WDHA-FM.

In 1971, WMTR was sold to Drexel Hill Associates, who owned WDHA-FM in Dover. WMTR's news department then began to supply newscasts to WDHA-FM. WMTR did keep the MOR format but did begin mixing on a few soft rock/adult contemporary cuts into the format. In the late 1970s, WMTR got a pre-sunrise authorization allowing the station to begin operations no later than 6:00 a.m. even if it were still dark. Also the MOR format evolved into Adult Contemporary by 1980. Beginning on December 3, 1979, the station began to air traffic reports from Shadow Traffic during morning and afternoon rush hours. Shadow's Bernie Wagenblast broadcast the reports for the first five years.

In 1980, WMTR got post-sunset authorization allowing the station to stay on the air until 6 p.m. even if it got dark before in the winter. This would allow WMTR to be on the air at least 12 hours a day in December. This became a moot point in 1982 when the station became 24-hour-a-day license. At night they increase their output power from 5,000 to 7,000 Watts and switch antennas resulting in their signal pattern being concentrated more to the southeast than it is during the day. A new pair of Harris solid state transmitters were installed, replacing the decades-old Collins 21E transmitter.

They continued their Full Service AC format, and began broadcasting in C-QUAM AM stereo in 1983. The station played rock and roll oldies from the 1960s, AC/Top 40 cuts from the 1970s and 1980s AC cuts and currents. The ratings continued to be successful until the late 1980s. In the fall of 1989, WMTR added a Business News segment in mid-days. This format did poorly as well but by the winter of 1990, they dropped the AC format altogether and went with the Business News full-time. Live shifts were gone. Due to the low ratings, they also stopped 24/7 operations and signed off daily at 9 p.m.

In the spring of 1991, Signal Communications acquired WMTR (and WDHA). WDHA-FM's rock format was retained. however WMTR was in bad shape at that point, and in June WMTR changed its programming to "Easy Listening Standards" via Westwood One's "AM Only" format.

Ratings began to come back and WMTR was profitable by 1993. The station's format continued to rate high and be profitable throughout the decade. Very few changes were made over the years. In 1999, WMTR discontinued broadcasting in AM Stereo and began a simulcast with WWTR, 1170 AM, in Bridgewater Township. In 2001, WMTR (along with WDHA/WWTR/WRAT) was sold to Greater Media (owners of WMGQ/WCTC) in New Brunswick.

In early 2002, Westwood One's "AM Only" service - by then renamed "Adult Standards" - tweaked the format into more of an adult pop format similar to what WLTW New York had done back in 1984. The station still played Frank Sinatra type artists but now added more adult contemporary artists. The station began running sports programming in evenings and overnights. Still advertising was down on the station and research was done to determine the future direction.

Late in 2003, it was determined that WCBS-FM's broad-based oldies format, which had played music from the 1950s through the 1980s, had been watered down to the point that the pre-1964 oldies were practically gone. It was felt that there was a need for a radio station that played only pre-1964 Oldies. So on January 5, 2004, WMTR switched to a "Classic Oldies" format, featuring songs from 1954 to 1963. The station also played a handful of oldies from the late 1960s but only by pre-1964 artists. The station originally played absolutely no Beatles and very limited songs by artists like the Four Seasons or Motown. It was stated that in a few years WMTR would phase in some post-1964 oldies as the audience matured. Soon after the format change the evening specialty shows and the sports talk and talk programming were phased out. Some specialty programming was retained Saturday and Sunday mornings from 6:00 a.m. to noon, mostly brokered shows.

The new format did extremely well. An obvious hole in the market was filled by the pre-1964 oldies format. On June 3, 2005, WCBS-FM which had a 1960s/1970s format by then, abruptly and changed to an adult rock oriented format called Jack FM. Immediately after this change, WMTR began playing more Four Seasons and Motown music and added moderate amounts of British Invasion artists, such as the Beatles, Hollies, and Peter & Gordon. Initially, they only played a couple such songs an hour but as time went on they began to play about half pre-64 and half post-64 oldies to fill the void left by CBS-FM (which later returned to their oldies/classic hits format in July 2007). On November 1, 2005, WMTR dropped the simulcast on 1170 AM. In the spring of 2006, WMTR began to mix in a few limited 1970s songs. Still, it's the pre-1964 oldies that the station continues to emphasize.

In July 2008 the format changed when the Jones Radio Networks syndicated Good Time Oldies format was brought in to WMTR and sister station WCTC. That format offered mostly music from 1964 to 1975 with one or two pre 1964 oldies per hour and an occasional late 1970s or 1980s song. Except for WMTR's long time local morning show - "Chris Edwards and the WMTR Morning Team", the syndicated format provided the air personalities the rest of the day. Public affairs and paid programming remained on the station on Saturday and Sunday mornings until noon. As of New Year's Eve 2008, WMTR dropped the "Good Time Oldies" satellite feed and switched back to the locally produced "Classic Oldies" format.

On July 19, 2016, Beasley Media Group announced it would acquire Greater Media and its 21 stations (including WMTR) for $240 million. The FCC approved the sale on October 6, and the sale closed on November 1.
