= WEWO =

Radio station in Laurinburg, North Carolina

- Laurinburg, North Carolina; United States
- Frequency: 1460 kHz

Programming
- Format: Gospel
- Affiliations: ABC Radio

Ownership
- Owner: Service Media, Inc.

Technical information
- Licensing authority: FCC
- Facility ID: 9077
- Class: B
- Power: 5,000 watts fulltime
- Transmitter coordinates: 34°47′0.00″N 79°30′40.00″W
- Translator: (92.5 MHz) W223DH (Laurinburg)

Links
- Public license information: Public file; LMS

WEWO (1460 AM) is a radio station broadcasting a Gospel format. It is licensed to Laurinburg, North Carolina, United States. It is currently owned by Service Media, Inc. and features programming from ABC Radio.

== History ==
When WEWO signed on in the 1940s, the call letters officially meant "Wonderful Environment, Wonderful Opportunity," though the station's personalities came up with other meanings, such as "We Entertain Women Only" and "We Eat Wild Onions."

In April 1996, Beasley Broadcasting announced plans to buy WEWO, a sports talk station, and WAZZ.

In 1998, Wes Cookman, the owner of WIDU in Fayetteville, bought WEWO and made it part of the "WE-DO" black gospel and news and information network, along with WAGR. WFMO was added later.
