= Beasley Broadcast Group =

American radio broadcast company

Beasley Broadcast Group, Inc.
- Type: Public
- Traded as: Nasdaq: BBGI (Class A); Russell 2000 Index component
- Industry: Advertising; Radio broadcasting
- Founded: 1961; 65 years ago, in Benson, North Carolina, U.S.
- Headquarters: Naples, Florida, U.S.
- Key people: Caroline Beasley (CEO); Bruce G. Beasley; (president, COO, director); Mark S. Fowler (director)
- Products: Radio Stations
- Revenue: ▲$262 million (2019) ▲$257 million (2018)
- Operating income: ▲US $25.9 million (2006)
- Net income: ▲US $10.1 million (2006); $5.3 million (2009)
- Number of employees: 748; 417 (2009)
- Subsidiaries: Beasley Media Group, Inc.
- Website: BBGI Corporate Website

Beasley Broadcast Group, Inc., based in Naples, Florida, is an owner/operator of radio stations in the United States. As of October 2026, the company owns 47 stations under the Beasley Media Group name.

== History ==
The company was founded in 1961 by George G. Beasley. On February 11, 2000, the group completed its IPO.

On October 2, 2014, CBS Radio announced that it would trade 14 radio stations located in Tampa, Florida, Charlotte, North Carolina and Philadelphia, Pennsylvania to the Beasley Broadcast Group in exchange for 5 stations located in Miami and Philadelphia. The swap was completed on December 1, 2014.

On January 15, 2015, Beasley reorganized its radio stations, previously held by various subsidiaries, into Beasley Media Group; the Beasley Broadcast Group name was retained for the parent company.

On July 19, 2016, Beasley announced that it would acquire Greater Media for $240 million. The FCC approved the sale on October 6, and the sale closed on November 1. The deal gave Beasley additional stations in the Philadelphia and Boston markets and expanded the company into Detroit and three New Jersey markets.

On February 2, 2017, Beasley announced that it would sell its six stations and four translators in the Greenville-New Bern-Jacksonville, North Carolina, market to Curtis Media Group for $11 million to reduce the company's debt; one of the stations, WNCT-FM, was concurrently divested to Inner Banks Media to comply with FCC ownership limits. The sale was completed on May 1, 2017.

On November 1, 2017, as part of the Entercom-CBS Radio merger, Beasley announced that it would sell AC-formatted station WMJX in Boston to Entercom, in exchange for all sports-formatted station WBZ-FM, also in Boston. The sale was completed on December 20, 2017.

On July 19, 2018, Entercom announced that it would sell WXTU in Philadelphia back to Beasley Broadcast Group for $38 million (in order to comply with DOJ revenue limits), as part of its purchase of market-leading WBEB also in Philadelphia. The deal was completed on September 28.

On November 14, 2019, Beasley Broadcast Group announced the acquisition of the Houston Outlaws, a professional Overwatch esports team that competes in the Overwatch League, from Immortals Gaming Club. The purchase marked the company's third esports venture.

On August 22, 2021, Beasley became the owner of a Rocket League organization called AXLE-R8. Four players were selected from a gauntlet where teams would compete in an open qualifier to eventually try and win a 1-year contract from Beasley.

== Stations by state ==
- Arizona:
- KXTE 107.9FM X (Alt Rock)
- KOAS 105.7FM Máxima (Bilingual AC)
- Florida:
- WJBR 1010AM Florida Alumni Radio (Sports)
- WLLD 94.1FM Wild (Rhythmic CHR)
- WQYK-FM 99.5FM QYK (Country)
- WRBQ-FM 104.7FM Q105 (Classic Hits)
- WYUU 92.5FM Máxima (Latin Pop)
- Georgia:
- WDRR 93.9FM Bob FM (Classic Hits)
- WGAC 580AM Newstalk (News Radio)
- WGAC-FM 95.1FM Newstalk (FM Simulcast of 580AM)
- Massachusetts:
- WBOS 92.9FM Bloomberg Boston (Financial Talk)
- WBQT 96.9FM Hot (Rhythmic Hot AC)
- WBZ-FM 98.5FM The Sports Hub (Sports Radio)
- WKLB-FM 102.5FM Country (Country)
- WRCA 1330AM / W291CZ 106.1FM Rock (Classic Rock)
- WROR-FM 105.7FM WROR (Classic Hits)
- Michigan:
- WCSX 94.7FM WCSX (Classic Rock)
- WDMK 105.9FM Kiss-FM (Urban AC)
- WMGC-FM 105.1FM The Bounce (Classic Hip Hop)
- WRIF 101.1FM 101WRIF (Active Rock)
- W228CJ 93.5FM / W256EA 99.1FM La Tricolor (Regional Mexican)
- Nevada:
- KKLZ 96.3FM KKLZ (Classic Hits)
- KCTE 102.7FM Coyote Country (Country)
- New Jersey:
- WCTC 1450AM / W228DY 93.5FM Fox Sports NJ (Sports Radio)
- WDHA-FM 105.5FM WDHA (Mainstream Rock)
- WJRZ-FM 100.1FM WJRZ (Classic Hits)
- WMGQ 98.3FM Magic (Adult Contemporary)
- WMTR 1250AM Classic Oldies (Oldies)
- WPEN 97.5FM The Fanatic (Sports Radio)
- WRAT 95.9FM The Rat (Mainstream Rock)
- WTMR 800AM WTMR-AM (Brokered And Religious Programming)
- North Carolina:
- WAZZ 93.5FM My Kiss Radio (Contemporary Hit Radio)
- WBAV-FM 101.9FM V (Urban AC)
- WFLB 96.5FM Jack FM (Adult Hits)
- WKML 95.7FM The Big (Country)
- WKQC 104.7FM K (Adult Contemporary)
- WPEG 97.9FM Power 98 (Mainstream Urban)
- WSOC-FM 103.7FM Country (Country)
- WUKS 107.7FM The Bounce (Classic Hip Hop)
- WZFX 99.1FM Foxy 99 (Mainstream Urban)
- Pennsylvania:
- WBEN-FM 95.7FM Ben FM (Adult Hits)
- WMGK 102.9FM MGK (Classic Rock)
- WMMR 93.3FM WMMR (Active Rock)
- WTEL 610AM Philadelphia's BIN (Black Oriented News)
- WWDB 860AM Talk (Brokered Programming)
- WXTU 92.5FM XTU (Country)
- South Carolina:
- WHHD 98.3FM HD (Top-40)
- WKXC-FM 99.5FM Kicks 99 (Country)
