= Fairmont, North Carolina =

- Town
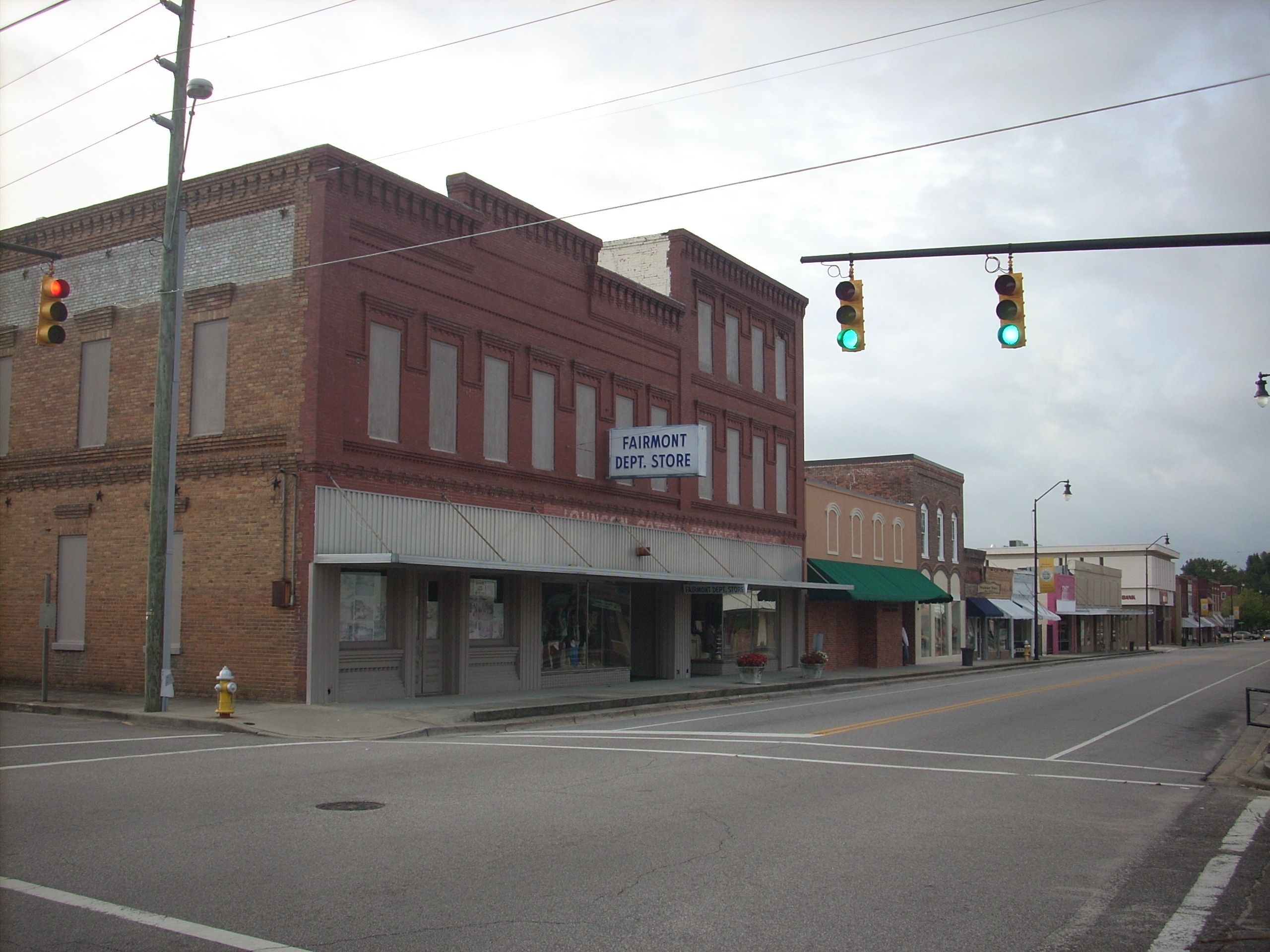
- Main Street

- Flag Seal
- Motto(s): "A Proud Past, A Promising Future"
- Location within the state of North Carolina
- Coordinates: 34°29′41″N 79°06′49″W
- Country: United States
- State: North Carolina
- County: Robeson

Area
  - Total: 2.76 sq mi (7.16 km^{2})
  - Land: 2.76 sq mi (7.15 km^{2})
  - Water: 0.0039 sq mi (0.01 km^{2})
- Elevation: 118 ft (36 m)

Population (2020)
  - Total: 2,191
  - Density: 793.7/sq mi (306.44/km^{2})
- Time zone: UTC-5 (Eastern (EST))
  - Summer (DST): UTC-4 (EDT)
- ZIP code: 28340
- Area codes: 910, 472
- FIPS code: 37-22360
- GNIS feature ID: 2406479
- Website: https://www.fairmontnc.gov/

Fairmont is a town in Robeson County, North Carolina, United States. The population was 2,191 at the 2020 census.

== History ==
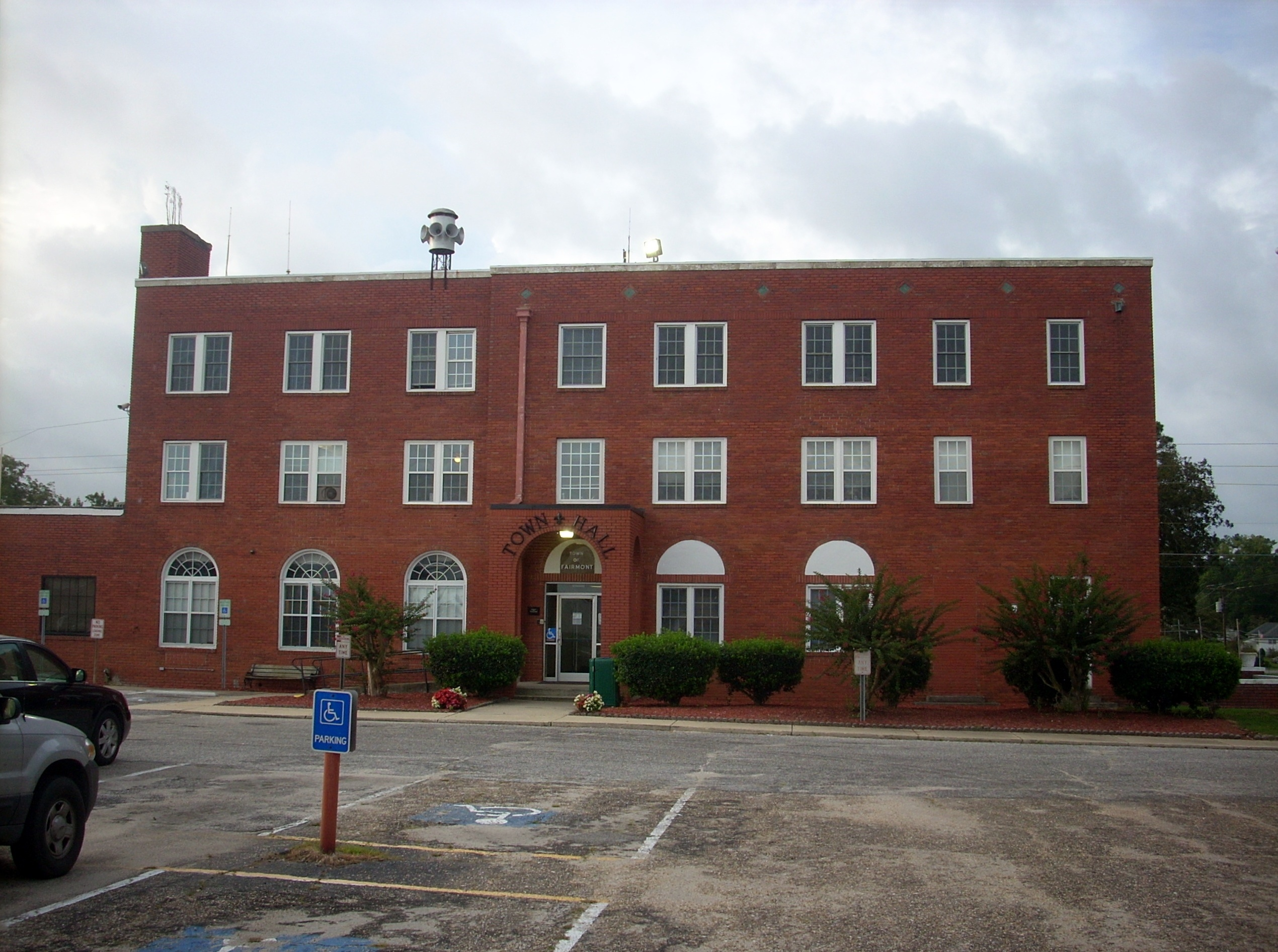
Fairmont town hall

Fairmont was originally known as Ashpole in homage to the nearby Ashpole Swamp. It was incorporated as Union City in 1899, but the name was changed back to Ashpole in 1901. Six years later the name was changed to Fairmont.

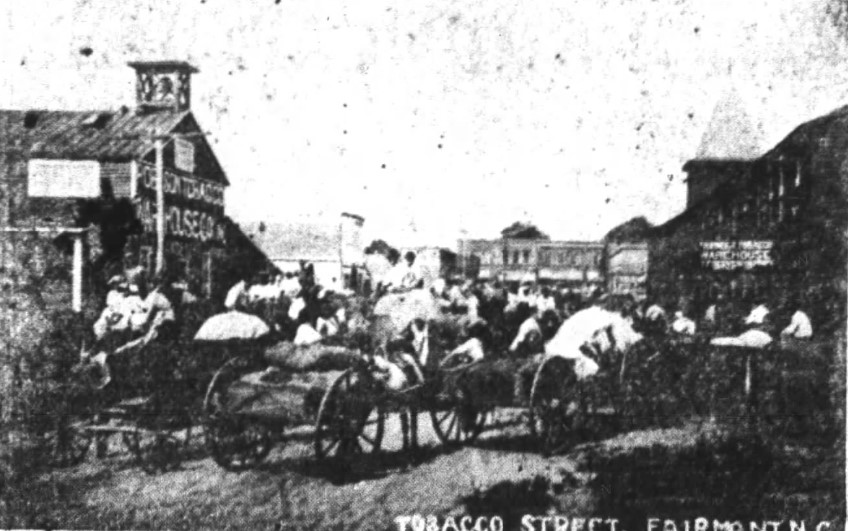
Farmers taking tobacco to market in Fairmont in the early 1900s

The first settlers to this area received land grants from the Lords Proprietors and worked in the logging and naval stores industries producing lumber, turpentine and pitch for ships. The Bufort County Lumber Company opened in the northern section of town in the late 1890s employing 300 men and becoming one of the largest lumber companies in the south. By the late 19th century, a thriving tobacco market had been established as well. The railroads later followed to rapidly move these goods. By the early 20th century, tobacco became king, and by the late 1940s, Fairmont was considered the "Biggest Little Tobacco Market In the World." In 1951 Fairmont sold twice as much tobacco as was grown in Robeson County. As health concerns have affected the sales of tobacco, many local farmers have turned to other cash crops, mainly corn, soybeans and wheat. The Border Belt Farmers Museum was established in 1989 by converting an unused former railroad depot into a museum filled with farming, tobacco related, and historical memorabilia. It is open five days a week (M, W, F-11:00-3:00 & T, TH 9-12:00 & 1:00-3:00). The town has recently started promoting itself as "the shortest route to the S.C. beaches" by encouraging motorists traveling south on Interstate 95 to take exit 10. The advertising campaign, utilizing a very prominent billboard on the interstate, has resulted in a higher traffic flow and increased commercial traffic to the community.

Scenes from the movie Arthur Newman were filmed here.

The Fairmont Commercial Historic District was listed on the National Register of Historic Places in 2010.

== Geography ==
Fairmont lies within the Carolina Border Belt, a regional network of tobacco markets and warehouses along both sides of the North Carolina-South Carolina border.

According to the United States Census Bureau, the town has a total area of 2.2 square miles (5.7 km^{2}), all land.

== Demographics ==
Historical population
Census	Pop.	Note	%±
1900	432		—
1910	730		69.0%
1920	1,000		37.0%
1930	1,314		31.4%
1940	1,993		51.7%
1950	2,319		16.4%
1960	2,286		−1.4%
1970	2,827		23.7%
1980	2,658		−6.0%
1990	2,489		−6.4%
2000	2,604		4.6%
2010	2,663		2.3%
2020	2,191		−17.7%
2022 (est.)	2,188	▼	−0.1%
U.S. Decennial Census

=== 2020 census ===
Fairmont racial composition
Race	Num.	Perc.
White (non-Hispanic)	532	24.28%
Black or African American (non-Hispanic)	1,266	57.78%
Native American	272	12.41%
Asian	7	0.32%
Other/Mixed	84	3.83%
Hispanic or Latino	30	1.37%

As of the 2020 census, Fairmont had a population of 2,191. The median age was 50.0 years. 20.2% of residents were under the age of 18 and 27.2% were 65 years of age or older. For every 100 females, there were 78.1 males, and for every 100 females age 18 and over, there were 71.5 males age 18 and over.

0.0% of residents lived in urban areas, while 100.0% lived in rural areas.

There were 955 households in Fairmont, of which 29.3% had children under the age of 18. There were 644 families residing in the town. Of all households, 27.5% were married-couple households, 19.2% had a male householder with no spouse or partner present, and 48.9% had a female householder with no spouse or partner present. About 35.7% of households were made up of individuals, and 19.6% had someone living alone who was 65 years of age or older.

There were 1,107 housing units, of which 13.7% were vacant. The homeowner vacancy rate was 1.6%, and the rental vacancy rate was 12.1%.

=== 2010 census ===
As of the 2010 United States census, there were 2,663 people living in the town. The racial makeup of the town was 56.0% Black, 26.0% White, 13.3% Native American, 0.2% Asian, 0.1% from some other race and 2.5% from two or more races. 1.9% were Hispanic or Latino of any race.

=== 2000 census ===
As of the census of 2000, there were 2,604 people, 1,078 households, and 685 families living in the town. The population density was 1,171.4 inhabitants per square mile (452.3/km^{2}). There were 1,186 housing units at an average density of 533.5 per square mile (206.0/km^{2}). The racial makeup of the town was 30.26% White, 58.68% African American, 9.87% Native American, 0.23% Asian, 0.46% from other races, and 0.50% from two or more races. Hispanic or Latino of any race were 0.58% of the population.

There were 1,078 households, out of which 27.4% had children under the age of 18 living with them, 33.0% were married couples living together, 27.1% had a female householder with no husband present, and 36.4% were non-families. 33.7% of all households were made up of individuals, and 18.6% had someone living alone who was 65 years of age or older. The average household size was 2.32 and the average family size was 2.95.

In the town, the population was spread out, with 25.5% under the age of 18, 8.0% from 18 to 24, 21.7% from 25 to 44, 24.4% from 45 to 64, and 20.4% who were 65 years of age or older. The median age was 41 years. For every 100 females, there were 77.4 males. For every 100 females age 18 and over, there were 66.5 males.

The median income for a household in the town was $17,194, and the median income for a family was $28,409. Males had a median income of $28,597 versus $17,716 for females. The per capita income for the town was $12,006. About 30.4% of families and 32.9% of the population were below the poverty line, including 42.9% of those under age 18 and 32.0% of those age 65 or over.

== Notable people ==
- Rod Griffin, 1977 ACC Player of the Year (basketball)
- Joy J. Johnson, Baptist minister and state legislator
- Effie Neal Jones, civil rights activist
- Joseph Mitchell, American writer
- Thomas Avery Nye, Jr., politician

== Works cited ==
- Powell, William S. (1976). The North Carolina Gazetteer: A Dictionary of Tar Heel Places. Chapel Hill: The University of North Carolina Press. ISBN 9780807812471.
