= WAAV =

Radio station in Leland–Wilmington, North Carolina

- Leland, North Carolina; United States
- Broadcast area: Wilmington, North Carolina
- Frequency: 980 kHz
- Branding: 107.9 and 980 The WAAV

Programming
- Format: News/talk/sports
- Affiliations: Fox News Radio; Compass Media Networks; Premiere Networks; Westwood One

Ownership
- Owner: Cumulus Media; (Cumulus Licensing LLC)
- Sister stations: WGNI, WKXS-FM, WMNX, WWQQ-FM

History
- First air date: 1957
- Former call signs: WKLM (1957–1984)
- Call sign meaning: pronounced "wave"

Technical information
- Licensing authority: FCC
- Facility ID: 25999
- Class: D
- Power: 5,000 watts day; 85 watts night
- Transmitter coordinates: 34°14′53.6″N 78°0′2″W
- Translator: 107.9 W300DX (Leland)
- Repeater: 102.7 WGNI-HD2 (Wilmington)

Links
- Public license information: Public file; LMS
- Webcast: Listen Live
- Website: 980waav.com

WAAV (980 AM) is a radio station broadcasting a news/talk format. Licensed to Leland, North Carolina, United States, it serves the Wilmington area. The station is owned by Cumulus Media. WAVV first aired in 1957.

== History ==
WAAV debuted as an FM station in 1972 at 102.7, and would remain there until 1981, when Cape Fear Broadcasting from Fayetteville purchased WAAV and WGNI. At that time, the station flipped from FM to AM 1340; in 1984 the station moved to 980, where it remains today. The previous occupant of the 980 frequency was top 40 WKLM, part of the Harold Thoms Group.

Because of FCC regulations regarding the number of stations one owner could have, WAAV had to be sold in 1988. Don Ansell, who was hosting the morning show "Talk Of The Town", bought the station and ran it until selling it to Cumulus Media in 1997.

After Hurricane Diana hit the area in September 1984, WAAV had just started its news/talk format, and it was the only radio station on the air, using a diesel generator named "Old Bessie". Ansell stayed on the air for 24 hours using a flashlight and a telephone. Ansell said, "It put us on the map." He said to The Star-News back then, "'It's quite a bit different when there are no crutches. No tapes, no music, no commercials – just your voice."

Bob Kwesell, whose conservative views offended a number of Raleigh, North Carolina-area listeners of WPTF, began broadcasting "Wrestle with Kwesell" on WAAV and WFNC in Fayetteville on December 29, 1986.

In September 1994, WAAV planned an FM station at 94.1 which would air sports talk. The AM station already had a number of sports programs. Roman Gabriel III, a USFL player and son of Los Angeles Rams quarterback Roman Gabriel, began hosting the station's first five-day-a-week sports talk program August 1, 1994. At that time, the station aired UNC and N. C. State football and basketball (including coaches' shows), "ACC Hotline", NASCAR races and talk shows, high school football, college football, "Monday Night Football", the NBA Charlotte Hornets, the CBS Radio baseball game of the week, The World Series, UNCW baseball and women's basketball, and American Legion baseball. For their two years in the area, WAAV also aired the games of the minor league baseball Port City Roosters.

On April 30, 1997, Cumulus Broadcasting announced its purchase of WAAV, WWQQ-FM, WXQR-FM, and WQSL. Ansell stayed as host of "Talk of the Town". After the purchase WAAV dropped UNCW sports. UNCW games moved first to WMFD and then to WLGX before returning to WAAV three years later.

On December 21, 2006, Ansell retired after 22 years as WAAV morning host; on January 2, 2007, Marty Shirah took over, and remained there until May 28, 2010. On June 1, he moved to late afternoons.

On June 1, 2010, Curtis Wright, conservative host of "The Morning Beat", previously heard on WLTT/WNTB, debuted a new conservative talk radio morning show on the station and on Cumulus sister station WFNC in Fayetteville. Curtis' show lasted until Labor Day 2012. The Tyler Cralle Show moved from 5–7 p.m. to 6–10 a.m. on September 4, 2012. As is true for most corporate broadcast entities, shaving costs to increase the bottom line have cost the station much of its live programming and is providing less of its own news content, utilizing local TV station WECT for news updates.

On May 3, 2021, Nick Craig took over mornings hosting "Wilmington’s Morning News with Nick Craig".
