= WAAV (disambiguation) =

WAAV refers to the following broadcasting stations in the United States:

- WAAV, a radio station (980 AM) licensed to Leland, North Carolina
- WGNI, a radio station (102.7 FM) licensed to Wilmington, North Carolina, which held the call sign WAAV from 1971 to 1981
- WLSG, a radio station (1340 AM) licensed to Wilmington, North Carolina,, which held the call sign WAAV from 1981 to 1984
- WKXS-FM, a radio station (94.5 FM) licensed to Leland, North Carolina, which held the call sign WAAV from 1994 to 2000
