= WUIN =

WUIN may refer to:

- WUIN (FM), a radio station (98.3 FM) licensed to Carolina Beach, North Carolina, United States
- WFBT (FM), a radio station (106.7 FM) licensed to Wilmington, North Carolina, United States, known as WUIN from 2003 to 2011
- WLTT, a defunct radio station (1180 AM) formerly licensed to Carolina Beach, North Carolina, United States, briefly known as WUIN in January 2011
