= WMYB =

WMYB may refer to:

- WMYB (FM), a radio station (92.1 MHz) licensed to Myrtle Beach, South Carolina
- WMYB (AM), a radio station (1450 AM) licensed to Myrtle Beach, South Carolina, United States from the 1950s to the 1980s
- WRNN-FM, a radio station (99.5 FM) licensed to Socastee, South Carolina, United States, which used the WMYB call sign from 1995 to 2000
- "What Makes You Beautiful", a 2011 song by One Direction from Up All Night
