= WWIL =

WWIL may refer to:

- WWIL (AM), a defunct radio station (1490 AM) formerly licensed to Wilmington, North Carolina, United States
- WWIL-FM, a radio station (90.5 FM) licensed to Wilmington, North Carolina
- Siti Networks (previously known as Wire and Wireless (India) Limited (WWIL)), an Indian company that provides digital cable television services
