= WMYT =

WMYT may refer to:

- WMYT-TV, a television station (channel 55) licensed to Rock Hill, South Carolina, United States
- WFBT (FM), a radio station (106.7 FM) licensed to Carolina Beach, North Carolina, United States, which held the call sign WMYT from 2011 to 2017
- WLTT, a defunct radio station (1180 AM) formerly licensed to Carolina Beach, North Carolina, formerly known as WMYT
