= WMFD =

WMFD could refer to three broadcast stations in the United States:

- WMFD (AM), a radio station broadcasting at 630 kHz AM, licensed to Wilmington, North Carolina
- WMFD-TV, a television station broadcasting on channel 12 digital (68.1 virtual) licensed to Mansfield, Ohio
- WECT, a television station broadcasting on channel 6, licensed to Wilmington, North Carolina, which used the call sign WMFD-TV from 1954 to 1958
- WMNX, a radio station broadcasting at 97.3 mHz FM, licensed to Wilmington, North Carolina, which used the call sign WMFD-FM from 1988 to 1989
