= WRNN =

WRNN may refer to:

- WRNN-TV, a television station (channel 48) licensed to New Rochelle, New York, United States
- WRNN-FM, a radio station (99.5 FM) licensed to Socastee, South Carolina, United States
- WWHK (AM), a radio station (1450 AM) licensed to Myrtle Beach, South Carolina, United States, which held the call sign WRNN from 2007 until 2018
