= WYHW =

Bible Broadcasting Network radio station in Wilmington, North Carolina, United States

- Wilmington, North Carolina; United States
- Broadcast area: Wilmington, North Carolina
- Frequency: 104.5 MHz
- Branding: Bible Broadcasting Network

Programming
- Format: Christian radio

Ownership
- Owner: Bible Broadcasting Network
- Sister stations: WAZO, WKXB, WMFD, WRMR

History
- First air date: 1994; 32 years ago
- Former call signs: WUOY (1991–1996); WRQR (1996–2008); WSSM (2008); WILT (2008–2015)

Technical information
- Licensing authority: FCC
- Facility ID: 74159
- Class: C3
- ERP: 17,000 watts
- HAAT: 120 meters
- Transmitter coordinates: 34°5′52.3″N 77°58′17.2″W

Links
- Public license information: Public file; LMS
- Webcast: Listen live
- Website: bbn1.bbnradio.org

WYHW (104.5 FM) is a radio station broadcasting a Christian radio format. Licensed to Wilmington, North Carolina, United States, the station serves the Wilmington area. WYHW is currently owned by Bible Broadcasting Network.

== History ==
"Gold 104" signed on in 1994 with an oldies format. The original call sign was WUOY, it used a satellite fed network oldies format.

In May 1996, Community Broadcasting sold radio stations WUOY, WMFD and WBMS to a new company named Ocean Broadcasting. At this time, WUOY changed from 1970s rock music to rock from the 1960s through the 1990s.

For many years, this station was rock WRQR "Rock 104.5".

In July 2004, NextMedia Group acquired WRQR, WAZO, and WMFD from Ocean Broadcasting LLC, and WKXB and WSFM from Sea-Comm Inc. In July 2008, Capitol Broadcasting announced its purchase of NextMedia's Wilmington stations.

On January 2, 2007, Two Guys Named Chris from WKRR in Greensboro, North Carolina began airing on WRQR, the first station other than Rock 92 to carry the show.

The Will FM variety hits format and call sign WILT moved March 31, 2008, from what is now WRMR in Jacksonville, North Carolina for a better signal in Wilmington.

The station flipped to an adult contemporary format on February 2, 2009.

In February 2013, the station dropped all 1970s songs from its library and adjusted to a bright adult contemporary format featuring songs from the 2000s and 1980s songs.

On November 19, 2015, it was announced the Bible Broadcasting Network would buy WILT as part of a requirement of Capitol's acquisition of WBNE from Sea-Comm Media; the purchase was consummated on December 1, 2015, at a price of $300,000. As a result, the WILT calls and Sunny format moved to WBNE on December 1, and 104.5 flipped to Christian radio under the new call sign WYHW.
