= Big Talker =

Big Talker may refer to:

- WYAY (FM), a radio station (106.3 FM) licensed to Bolivia, North Carolina, United States, which used the name from 2003 to 2013
- WFBT (FM), a radio station (106.7 FM) licensed to Carolina Beach, North Carolina, United States, which used the name from 2017 to 2021
- "Big Talker" (Garfield and Friends), an episode of the TV series Garfield and Friends
