= WIZN =

Coordinates: 44.311°N 73.242°W

- Vergennes, Vermont; United States
- Broadcast area: Burlington-Plattsburgh
- Frequency: 106.7 MHz
- Branding: 106.7 WIZN

Programming
- Format: Classic rock

Ownership
- Owner: Hall Communications
- Sister stations: WBTZ, WOKO, WJOY, WKOL

History
- First air date: October 1983 (at 106.3)
- Former frequencies: 106.3 MHz (1983–1988)
- Call sign meaning: "Wizard New England"

Technical information
- Licensing authority: FCC
- Facility ID: 7839
- Class: C2
- ERP: 50,000 watts
- HAAT: 114 meters (374 ft)

Links
- Public license information: Public file; LMS
- Webcast: Listen Live
- Website: wizn.com

WIZN (106.7 MHz) is a commercial FM radio station licensed to Vergennes, Vermont, serving the Champlain Valley and Burlington-Plattsburgh radio market. The station broadcasts a classic rock radio format branded as The Wizard. It is owned by Hall Communications.

Studios and offices are in Winooski. The transmitter is located off Church Hill Road in Charlotte.

== History ==
WIZN signed on the air in October 1983, owned by Radio Vergennes, Inc. The station began broadcasting from the Stevens House in Vergennes, Vermont, with an original line up of DJs Artie Lavigne, Joel Bolton, Mary L. Collins, Russ Kinsley, and Bill Henk. Along with Richard Longfellow, Russ Kinsley was the station's co-founder, its first general manager, program director, and music director. Collins was the promotions manager and copywriter. Bolton was the production director. Lavigne later purchased shares in the station and took over as president and general manager. WIZN was a local album rock station in the Vergennes area, powered at only 710 watts on a Class A regional frequency, 106.3 MHz.

By the late 1980s, the station increased power to its current 50,000 watts, and changed its dial position to 106.7, making it a Class C2 station. The power boost gave WIZN coverage of Burlington, Vermont's largest city, and much of the Champlain Valley. But it kept its original rock format and ownership for several decades. From the late 1990s until 2005, WIZN was the region's longtime home of The Howard Stern Show before Stern left radio syndication and moved to Sirius XM Radio.

In 2005, Hall Communications paid $17 million for WIZN. Hall moved the station from a mix of contemporary and classic rock to all classic rock, while co-owned 99.9 WBTZ concentrates on younger rock fans, airing an alternative rock format.

== Programming ==
Current on-air staff includes Mel Allen, who hosts The Highway To Mel in morning drive time, Dave Marshall middays, and Joey Vega with The Rockin Ride Home.

Weekends feature "Double Shots" combining two songs by the same artist, typically a hit song paired with a B side with the exception of the following Sunday programs: "Mr. Charlie", Charlie Frazier, hosts "Blues for Breakfast" on Sunday mornings - the longest-running program on the station which goes back to the station's inception in 1983. The station also airs two syndicated programs: the Grateful Dead-focused show The Grateful Dead Hour the Pink Floyd-focused show Floydian Slip.
