= WYAV =

- Myrtle Beach, South Carolina; United States
- Broadcast area: Grand Strand
- Frequency: 104.1 MHz
- Branding: Wave 104.1

Programming
- Format: Classic rock

Ownership
- Owner: Dick Broadcasting; (Dick Broadcasting Company, Inc. of Tennessee)
- Sister stations: WRNN-FM, WWHK, WKZQ-FM, WMYB

History
- Former call signs: WLAT-FM (1978–1984)
- Call sign meaning: Similar to "wave"

Technical information
- Licensing authority: FCC
- Facility ID: 36947
- Class: C1
- ERP: 100,000 watts
- HAAT: 299 meters
- Transmitter coordinates: 33°35′27.00″N 79°2′55.00″W

Links
- Public license information: Public file; LMS
- Webcast: Listen live
- Website: wave104.com

WYAV (104.1 FM) is a classic rock radio station licensed to Myrtle Beach, South Carolina and serves the Grand Strand area. The station is licensed by the Federal Communications Commission (FCC) to broadcast with an effective radiated power (ERP) of 100 kW. The station goes by the name Wave 104.1 and its current slogan is "Classic Rock Wave 104.1." Its studios are located in Myrtle Beach and its transmitter is located in Murrells Inlet.

== History ==
WLAT-FM in Conway, South Carolina played beautiful music at one time. The station then changed its call sign to WYAV and changed the format to a CHR/Top 40 format, under their new name as "The New Wave 104 FM". In the mid-1980s WYAV became the market's first 100,000-watt station and made another format change to AC. At the height of the station's popularity, WYAV bought an ad in the Myrtle Beach Sun-News to congratulate the listeners on making it the number-one station in the market. The format later changed to Adult Top 40, and eventually Classic Rock in November 1993.

In the 1990s, WYAV added Howard Stern. Eventually, Stern became too controversial and was dropped because the station couldn't sell advertising for him, according to program director Brian Rickman.

Mike Gagliano of WWBR Detroit became afternoon DJ and music director in 1999. Less than a year later he was back in Detroit at WRIF.

Previous logo

Until January 22, 2010, the station aired the syndicated morning show The Free Beer and Hot Wings Show. On January 25, 2010, Wave 104.1 and is sister station WKZQ-FM swapped morning shows.

The station is an affiliate of the syndicated Pink Floyd program "Floydian Slip."

In September 2017, Dick Broadcasting announced the purchase of Alpha Media stations in three markets — 18 stations and two translators in total, at a purchase price of $19.5 million. The acquisition of WYAV by Dick Broadcasting was consummated on December 20, 2017.
