= WWQQ-FM =

- Wilmington, North Carolina; United States
- Frequency: 101.3 MHz
- Branding: Double Q 101

Programming
- Format: Country
- Affiliations: Westwood One

Ownership
- Owner: Cumulus Media; (Cumulus Licensing LLC)
- Sister stations: WAAV, WGNI, WKXS-FM, WMNX

History
- First air date: March 31, 1969
- Former call signs: WMFD-FM (1969–1978); WEMA-FM (10/25/1978–1/22/1979)

Technical information
- Licensing authority: FCC
- Facility ID: 28163
- Class: C2
- ERP: 18,000 watts
- HAAT: 165 meters
- Transmitter coordinates: 34°05′52.6″N 77°58′17″W

Links
- Public license information: Public file; LMS
- Webcast: Listen live
- Website: wwqq101.com

WWQQ-FM (101.3 MHz) is a country music formatted radio station located in Wilmington, North Carolina.

It advertises itself as "Cape Fear's Country Leader".

== History ==
From its sign-on in 1969 until 1978, the call letters of this station were WMFD-FM, and it was partially simulcast with sister station WMFD. That year, Village Broadcasting of Chapel Hill bought the station from the Dunlea family, changed the call letters to WWQQ and started a country music format on the station. Station alumni from that era include Dan Hester, "Dr. Dale" O'Brian, Mike Grohman, Mark McKay, Joanie D., Tom Lamont, J.J Carroll and Tom Burton. In 1995, WXQR-FM joined the "Q Network" that included WWQQ and WQSL when HVS Partners bought the station. On April 30, 1997, Cumulus Broadcasting announced its purchase of WAAV, WWQQ, WXQR, and WQSL. Double Q 101 plays a variety of country music with the majority of songs ranging from the 1990s to today.
