= WBNU =

WBNU may refer to:

- WBNU-LP, a defunct low-power radio station (102.9 FM) licensed to serve Framingham, Massachusetts, United States
- WILT (FM), a radio station (103.7 FM) licensed to serve Wrightsville Beach, North Carolina, United States, which held the call sign WBNU from 2003 to 2007
