= WKEL =

WKEL may refer to:

- WKEL (FM), a radio station (88.1 FM) licensed to serve Webster, New York, United States
- WYRA, a radio station (98.5 FM) licensed to serve Confluence, Pennsylvania, United States, which held the call sign WKEL from 2007 to 2012
- WCSE (AM), a radio station (1450 AM) licensed to Myrtle Beach, South Carolina, which held the call sign WKEL from 1987 to 1988
