= WRMR =

WRMR may refer to:

- WRMR (FM), a radio station (98.7 FM) licensed to Jacksonville, North Carolina, United States which has carried the WRMR callsign since January 2011
- WHK (AM), a radio station (1420 AM) licensed to Cleveland, Ohio, United States which carried the WRMR callsign from 2003 to 2005
- WKNR, a radio station (850 AM) licensed to Cleveland, Ohio, United States which carried the WRMR callsign from 1985 to 2001
