= WLSG =

- Wilmington, North Carolina; United States
- Broadcast area: Wilmington, North Carolina
- Frequency: 1340 kHz
- Branding: La Raza 94.1

Programming
- Format: Regional Mexican

Ownership
- Owner: Norsan Media; (Norsan Consulting and Management, Inc.)

History
- First air date: 1946; 80 years ago
- Former call signs: WGNI (1946–1981); WAAV (1981–1984); WBMS (1984–1996); WAHH (1996–2000)

Technical information
- Licensing authority: FCC
- Facility ID: 58364
- Class: C
- Power: 1,000 watts
- Transmitter coordinates: 34°13′52″N 77°57′18″W
- Translator: 94.1 W231CL (Wilmington)

Links
- Public license information: Public file; LMS
- Website: larazalaraza.com/wilmington/

WLSG (1340 AM) is a radio station broadcasting a Regional Mexican format. Licensed to Wilmington, North Carolina, United States, it serves the Wilmington area. The station is currently owned by Norsan Media.

== FM Translator ==
WLSG is simulcast on FM translator W231CL 94.1 FM in Wilmington; the translator frequency is used in the station branding.

Broadcast translator for WLSG
Call sign	Frequency	City of license	FID	ERP (W)	Class	FCC info
W231CL	94.1 FM	Wilmington, North Carolina	146269	150	D	LMS

== History ==
WGNI was a Top 40 station in the days when the format was heard on AM radio. On December 24, 1981, its call sign changed to WAAV. On May 5, 1984, its call sign changed to WBMS.

Prior to 1990, WBMS was one of the first urban contemporary radio stations in Wilmington.

On May 20, 1996, Community Broadcasting sold radio stations WBMS, WMFD and WUOY to a new company called Ocean Broadcasting. WBMS, a CNN Headline News station, became WAHH, airing the "Radio AAHS" format for children, as well as some local content. The format included news, sports and games as well as music by James Taylor, Mariah Carey, The Muppets, Ren and Stimpy, Gloria Estefan, Animaniacs, Craig and Company, Smoking Armadillos, Fun Factory and Better Than Ezra.

WLSG, WWIL and WWIL-FM were part of Family Radio Group of Wilmington on July 13, 2000, when that company purchased WDVV and WMYT.

B&M Broadcasting made an offer to purchase the station from Olin Bohanan in December 2014. The acquisition was consummated on February 3, 2015, at a purchase price of $60,000. On February 5, 2015, WLSG's format changed to oldies, and also added an FM translator on 94.1 MHz. They also rebranded themselves as 94.1 The Beach.

On January 24, 2019, following the sale of the station to Norsan Media, WLSG's format changed from oldies to regional Mexican, branded as "La Raza 94.1".

== Previous logos ==
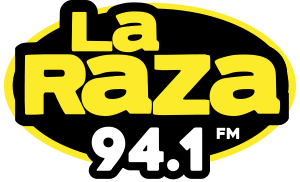
