= WUIN (FM) =

- Oak Island, North Carolina; United States
- Broadcast area: Wilmington, North Carolina
- Frequency: 98.3 MHz
- Branding: 98.3 The Penguin

Programming
- Format: Adult album alternative

Ownership
- Owner: Thomas Davis; (Davis Media, LLC)
- Sister stations: WNTB

History
- First air date: 2000
- Former call signs: WAZO (1998–2004); WSFM (2004–2011)
- Call sign meaning: W The PengUIN

Technical information
- Licensing authority: FCC
- Facility ID: 48626
- Class: C3
- ERP: 18,500 watts
- HAAT: 116 meters (381 ft)
- Transmitter coordinates: 33°57′40″N 78°01′37″W

Links
- Public license information: Public file; LMS
- Website: 983thepenguin.com

WUIN (98.3 MHz, "The Penguin") is an American FM radio station broadcasting an adult album alternative format. Licensed in Oak Island, North Carolina, the station serves the greater Wilmington, North Carolina, area. The station, originally established in 2000, is currently owned by Thomas Davis, through licensee Davis Media, LLC. WUIN features a broad variety of styles including reggae, blues, jazz, Americana, rock, soul and hip-hop.

== History ==
In 2000, Ocean Broadcasting LLC, which owned Wilmington radio stations WLGX, WRQR and WMFD, started a CHR radio station at 98.3 FM, licensed to Oak Island, North Carolina. Broadcasting at the equivalent of 25,000 watts from a 400-foot tower near Southport, and serving Brunswick and New Hanover counties, WAZO "Channel Z" played artists including the Red Hot Chili Peppers, Sugar Ray, Will Smith, the Backstreet Boys, Dave Matthews, TLC, Jennifer Lopez and Santana.

Surf 98.3 logo

In July 2004, NextMedia Group purchased WKXB and WSFM from Sea-Comm Inc., and WRQR, WAZO, and WMFD from Ocean Broadcasting LLC. The sale meant two big changes for Surf: the move to 98.3 FM, and the end of the controversial Lex and Terry, replaced with "The Mad Max Morning Show with Special K," based in Myrtle Beach, South Carolina. WAZO moved to 107.5 FM, former home of WSFM.

The station was a finalist for Radio and Records magazine's 2007 Industry Achievement Award for best Alternative Station for markets 100 and up. Other finalists include WKZQ-FM, WJSE, WBTZ, KQXR, and KXNA.

In July 2008, Capitol Broadcasting announced its purchase of NextMedia's Wilmington stations.

On December 31, 2010, Surf 98.3 went off the air. Brian Schimmel of Sunrise Broadcasting said the frequency was purchased by Sea-Comm Media, which moved the programming of WUIN from 106.7 to 98.3. A new station called "Coastal Carolina's Modern Rock 98.7" took its place.

Effective September 10, 2014, WUIN, WNTB, and WUDE were purchased from Sea-Comm by Davis Media, LLC, at a price of $1.5 million.
