= WKZQ-FM =

- Forestbrook, South Carolina; United States
- Broadcast area: Myrtle Beach, South Carolina
- Frequency: 96.1 MHz
- Branding: 96.1 WKZQ

Programming
- Format: Alternative rock

Ownership
- Owner: Dick Broadcasting; (Dick Broadcasting Company, Inc. of Tennessee)
- Sister stations: WMYB; WRNN-FM; WWHK; WYAV

History
- First air date: March 11, 1985 (as WAVF)
- Former call signs: WAVF (1985–2008)

Technical information
- Licensing authority: FCC
- Facility ID: 13890
- Class: C2
- ERP: 8,500 watts
- HAAT: 265.4 meters (871 ft)
- Transmitter coordinates: 33°35′27.6″N 79°2′54.1″W

Links
- Public license information: Public file; LMS
- Webcast: Listen live
- Website: 961wkzq.com

WKZQ-FM (96.1 MHz, "96.1 KZQ") is an alternative rock radio station licensed to Forestbrook, South Carolina and serves the Grand Strand area. The station is licensed by the Federal Communications Commission (FCC) to broadcast with an effective radiated power (ERP) of 8,500 watts. Its studios are located in Myrtle Beach and its transmitter is located in Murrells Inlet.

The format and call sign WKZQ-FM had been on 101.7 MHz since the late 1970s before a frequency swap on September 23, 2008.

== History ==
WKZQ-FM signed on July 3, 1969. Originally on 101.7 MHz, WKZQ was established as a "beautiful music" automated station, operating out of the back room of its big sister AM rocker, WTGR. At one point WKZQ played middle of the road music during the day, and Top 40/CHR at night when WTGR had to go off the air. In the mid-1970s General Manager Billy Hennecy transitioned to an oldies format with limited live announcers in morning (Bill Hennecy), afternoons (J. Patrick Milan), and night (Tommy Walters). Other day parts were automated until Hennecy hired Gregory "Greg" Fowler who took the FM station live and progressively formatted it to a mix of Top 40, rock, and oldies with female personality Linda King and Bradley "Bad Brad" Todd with the overnight duties when Rock 102 went 24 hours live in 1975..

During the 1980s WKZQ-FM had a full-time Top 40/CHR format. WTGR became WKZQ (AM) and began simulcasting the FM. In 1985, Marvin "Marv" Clark was morning host and Gary "The Freakin' Deacon" Dawson was afternoon host. When the FM station increased power from 3,000 to 50,000 watts in 1989, the format changed from Top 40/CHR to AOR.

On March 11, 1997, Tony Hirsh announced he was buying WKZQ-AM-FM from Tom Rogers, president of Grand Strand Broadcasting, which had owned both stations since each signed on.

Under the direction of both Bill and Greg, WKZQ overtook its sister station and went on to become Billboard Magazine's Station of the Year and won numerous Brandon 'Station of the Year' awards. Notable rock jocks who passed through 'KZQ were Billy "Bill" Hennecy, J. Patrick Milan, Bradley "Bad Brad" Todd, Tommy Walters, Jackson "Banana Jack" Murphy, Morgan "The Coach" Patrick, Sirius Satellite Radio host and programmer, Jeffrey "The Human Numan" Stone, who was known as Jeffrey "Shotgun Jeff" Stone, the late Bob Decay who was killed in auto accident in the late 1970s, WLS' Kenneth "Citizen Kenn" Heinlein, Gary "The Freakin' Deacon" Dawson, Brian Phillips, Jason "Jay" Charland, Mike Urban, Johnny Van Pelt, Chuckie "Boo Boo Boo" Baron, Bob Chase, Mike Willis, Scott Summers, Pamela "Pam" May, Marvin "Marv" Clark, Mixin Dixon Morrison, Henry Kaye, Christopher William, Johnny Kilgo, Raymond "Ray" Mariner, Jack Boston, with Linda King, and Gregory "Greg" Fowler who left to become manager of legendary country sensation, Alabama. As of May 21, 2009, J. Patrick, John, Jack, and Gary, can be heard online at QRockRadio.

In the 1990s, with other stations playing classic rock, WKZQ changed its emphasis to new rock adding alternative rock tracks with the first female music director and APD Summer James. The line up included Banana Jack in The Morning with various midday hosts including Charlie Sexton, Iceman and Scooter the Midday Chef. Summer also held down 7-midnight for the decade. Banana Jack Murphy and Summer both stayed through ownership changes from Grand Strand Broadcasting, Hirsch Broadcasting to NextMedia Group into the 2000s. Mixin’ Dixon returned in the 1990s. Johnny D. programmed the station in the early 1990s. Darren Taylor was his sidekick. Summer James (Award winning VoiceOver Talent) remained in the line up until moving to Los Angeles for a radio show. This line up known for broadcasting live every night.

With the purchase of the station by NextMedia Group, Brian Rickman was named program/music director and adjusted the station's format to alternative rock. In January 2002 Mad Max and Special-K joined WKZQ and hosted the Mad Max Morning Show until Special K's exit in February 2005. Mad Max and Special-K received #1 ratings and various awards including "Best Of The Beach" from the local Sun News as well as numerous Radio and Records "Best Stunts" awards. The Mad Max Morning Show heavily featured phone pranks, on location stunts as well as listener contests. Abbi along with Jerzee Boy were added to the show in the spring of 2005. Mad Max left KZQ in May 2006.

The station won Radio and Records' magazine's 2007 Industry Achievement Award for best Alternative Station for markets 100 and up. It was the station's second nomination in three years and the first win. Finalists also included WJSE, KQXR, WBTZ, KXNA, and WSFM.

In September 2008, WKZQ swapped frequencies with WAVF, abandoning its historic frequency of 101.7 MHz, and migrated to 96.1 MHz.

Mason "Mase" Brazelle was named Music Director of the Year for modern rock, secondary markets, in 2011.

WKZQ replaced the morning program The Free Beer and Hot Wings Show with Mike & Mike, a sports talk show from ESPN Radio, in 2013. By September 2014, that show had moved to WRNN (AM).

WKZQ's playlist includes new and classic alternative ranging from AWOLNATION, The Black Keys, Jack White and Arctic Monkeys to The Clash, Nirvana, Beastie Boys and Pearl Jam.

NextMedia Group sold WKZQ-FM and its 32 other radio stations to Digity, LLC for $85 million; the transaction was consummated on February 10, 2014. Effective February 25, 2016, Digity and its 124 radio stations were acquired by Alpha Media for $264 million.

In September 2017, Dick Broadcasting announced the purchase of Alpha Media stations in three markets — 18 stations and two translators in total, at a purchase price of $19.5 million. The acquisition of WKZQ-FM by Dick Broadcasting was consummated on December 20, 2017.
