= WOKO =

Country music radio station in Burlington, Vermont

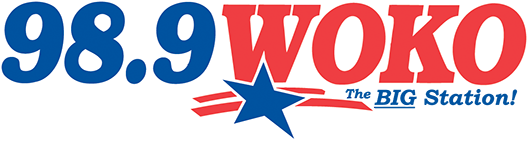
- Burlington, Vermont; United States
- Broadcast area: Burlington–Plattsburgh
- Frequency: 98.9 MHz
- Branding: 98.9 WOKO

Programming
- Format: Country music
- Affiliations: Compass Media Networks; Performance Racing Network

Ownership
- Owner: Hall Communications
- Sister stations: WBTZ; WIZN; WJOY; WKOL

History
- First air date: June 26, 1962
- Former call signs: WJOY-FM (1962–1972); WQCR (1972–1990)

Technical information
- Licensing authority: FCC
- Facility ID: 25867
- Class: C1
- ERP: 100,000 watts
- HAAT: 94 meters (308 ft)
- Transmitter coordinates: 44°27′3.1″N 73°11′49.4″W

Links
- Public license information: Public file; LMS
- Webcast: Listen live
- Website: www.woko.com

WOKO (98.9 FM) is an American radio station broadcasting a country music format. Licensed to Burlington, Vermont, United States, the station serves the Burlington-Plattsburgh area. The station is owned by Hall Communications.

== History ==
=== WJOY-FM ===
WJOY-FM signed on the air on June 26, 1962. It was Vermont's first FM radio station and broadcast a classical format, programmed separately from its AM counterpart, WJOY (1230 AM). The station contracted with Heritage Music, a company based in New York and Bellingham, Washington, to provide its musical selections. To prepare for FM broadcasting, one studio was cut in half to add an FM control room, and another studio was converted to a transmitter room for WJOY's AM and FM operations. In 1967, WJOY-AM-FM broke ground on new studio facilities, including a new and taller 359-foot (109 m) tower to replace the 220-foot (67 m) tower being used. WJOY-FM began stereo broadcasting in 1969.

=== WQCR ===
In 1971, Frank Balch, who had joined WJOY as an announcer in 1951, and had become president of the Vermont Broadcasting Corporation, acquired majority control of WJOY-AM-FM. The next year, on August 14, 1972, WJOY-FM became WQCR; the call letters were said to stand for "Wonderful Queen City Radio". The station continued to have an easy listening sound.

There were two major developments for WQCR in 1975. In February, it flipped to a rock format; in July, it increased its effective radiated power from 3,200 watts to 33,000, doubling its coverage area. Balch served in the late 1970s, as director of the National Association of Broadcasters and on the University of Vermont Board of Trustees. WQCR's power was further increased to 50,000 watts in 1980. Despite having fully automated programming, "Q99" was a strong second overall in the market in 1981, and led among young adults.

After 35 years in broadcasting, Balch sold WJOY-WQCR to Hall Communications of Norwich, Connecticut, for $2.2 million in 1983. The new ownership switched WQCR from automated to live programming. The 1984 sign-on of WXXX put a massive dent in WQCR's ratings; the new contemporary hit outlet debuted at number one and dropped WQCR from a 21.2 share in the fall 1984 Arbitron book to a 9.4.

September 9, 1988, brought technical and format changes. The station rebranded as "The New Rock 99 FM" the same day it doubled its power to 100,000 watts.

=== WOKO ===
On April 1, 1990, after 16 years as a rock station, WQCR switched to country music and adopted new WOKO call letters, seeking to fill a void in the market, which only had one FM country outlet. Around the same time, under the guidance of former executive vice president and COO Dick Reed, Hall flipped stations it owned serving New London, Connecticut, and Providence, Rhode Island, to country. The move was described by general manager Dan Dubonnet in 1992 as a quest to "save" the station, which was gaining little traction as a rocker; it tripled its weekly audience in the two years after the flip and benefited from the increased popularity of country music in the early 1990s. The station's success earned it back-to-back station of the year honors from the Vermont Association of Broadcasters in 1993 and 1994; by 1995, WOKO was back on top of the Burlington radio ratings. Hall became Vermont's first FM duopoly owner with its purchase of WEXP-FM that same year.
