= WJOY =

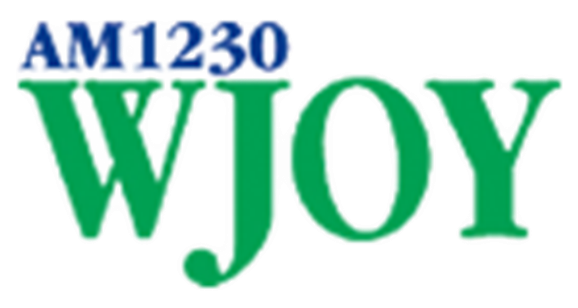
- Burlington, Vermont; United States
- Broadcast area: Burlington metropolitan area, Vermont
- Frequency: 1230 kHz
- Branding: AM 1230 WJOY

Programming
- Format: Adult standards; soft adult contemporary
- Affiliations: ABC News Radio; WPTZ

Ownership
- Owner: Hall Communications, Inc.
- Sister stations: WBTZ; WIZN; WKOL; WOKO

History
- First air date: September 14, 1946

Technical information
- Licensing authority: FCC
- Facility ID: 25864
- Class: C
- Power: 1,000 watts unlimited
- Transmitter coordinates: 44°27′3.18″N 73°11′49.46″W

Links
- Public license information: Public file; LMS
- Website: www.wjoy.com

WJOY (1230 kHz) is a commercial AM radio station broadcasting an adult standards and soft adult contemporary format. Licensed to Burlington, Vermont, the station is owned by Hall Communications, Inc. In addition to its music programming, WJOY carries hourly national news updates from ABC News Radio and a simulcast of WPTZ's 6 p.m. newscast.

== History ==
The Vermont Broadcasting Corporation was formed in late 1945 and obtained a construction permit from the Federal Communications Commission for a new radio station to serve Burlington on 1230 kHz on February 6, 1946. The station took the call letters and began broadcasting as WJOY on September 14, 1946; the outlet originated from two studios—one on College Street downtown and another on Main Street—and was affiliated with ABC.

In 1961, WJOY was approved for its first technical upgrade in station history, from 250 to 1,000 watts. It heralded the start of a busy decade for the station that included its first expansion. The next year, WJOY started WJOY-FM 98.9, which was the state's first commercial FM radio station.

The original College Street studios were on land leased to the Vermont Broadcasting Corporation by the University of Vermont. In 1966, the university desired to reclaim the land and build student housing on the property. As a result, WJOY built new custom studios on a piece of property in South Burlington; the transmitter was relocated, too, using a new 359-foot (109 m) tower to replace the 220-foot (67 m) tower that had previously been in service.

In 1971, Frank Balch, who had joined WJOY as an announcer in 1951 and had become president of the Vermont Broadcasting Corporation, acquired majority control of WJOY-AM-FM. After 35 years in broadcasting, Balch sold WJOY and the FM, by then WQCR, to Hall Communications of Norwich, Connecticut, for $2.2 million in 1983; by the time of the Hall purchase, WJOY was already airing a nostalgia format.

After carrying the nationally syndicated music service "America's Best Music" provided by Westwood One for many years, WJOY began programming its music locally in February 2023.
