= WGNI =

Radio station in Wilmington, North Carolina

- Wilmington, North Carolina; United States
- Broadcast area: Wilmington, North Carolina
- Frequency: 102.7 MHz (HD Radio)
- Branding: 102.7 GNI

Programming
- Format: Adult contemporary
- Subchannels: HD2: WAAV simulcast (news/talk)
- Affiliations: Compass Media Networks; Westwood One

Ownership
- Owner: Cumulus Media; (Cumulus Licensing LLC)
- Sister stations: WKXS-FM, WMNX, WWQQ-FM

History
- First air date: 1971 (as WAAV)
- Former call signs: WAAV (1971–1981); WAAV-FM (September 3 – October 24, 1981)

Technical information
- Licensing authority: FCC
- Facility ID: 8581
- Class: C1
- ERP: 100,000 watts
- HAAT: 299 meters (981 ft)
- Transmitter coordinates: 34°03′6.6″N 78°04′56″W

Links
- Public license information: Public file; LMS
- Webcast: Listen live
- Website: wgni.com

WGNI (102.7 FM) is a radio station broadcasting an adult contemporary format. Licensed to Wilmington, North Carolina, United States, it serves the Wilmington area. The station is owned by Cumulus Licensing LLC.

== History ==
The call letters WGNI were originally assigned to 1340 AM in Wilmington. The station went on the air on Christmas Eve in 1945. The original station was owned by General Newspapers Inc, publisher of the Wilmington Post. The Station was known as "The Rock of Coastal Carolina". The studios were located in the 200 block of Princess Street in downtown Wilmington.

The studios were moved to the Eagle Island transmitter site in the late 1950s, then to 211 North Second Street until the spring of 1992, afterwards they relocated to 1890 Dawson Street and then in July 2001 moved to their current location of 3233 Burnt Mill Road in Wilmington.

The FM (102.7) was put on the air in 1971 as WAAV, a beautiful music station. By this time, the AM transmitter site had been moved to River Road near Greenfield Lake and the original FM antenna was side mounted on the AM tower. Subsequently, a taller tower was built on the site to house the FM antenna until the station was sold to an owner which then purchased an existing tower south of Wilmington to upgrade their signal.

In 1981, WAAV and WGNI were sold to Cape Fear Broadcasting, which was based in Fayetteville with two stations, WFNC and WQSM. Once this sale took place, WAAV and WGNI switched call letters and frequencies, WAAV going to 1340, and WGNI to 102.7. In the process WAAV changed to the "Music of Your Life" format and WGNI picked up the adult contemporary format.

In the fall of 1999, Cape Fear Broadcasting announced the sale of their Wilmington and Fayetteville stations to their current owners, Cumulus Media. This sale was challenged by Ocean Broadcasting of Wilmington because it would give Cumulus 6 FMs and an AM in Wilmington, and about 55 percent of market revenue. After selling one of their FM's, a change in the FCC, and other matters, the sale was finally approved in the spring of 2001.

GNI features several promotions each year. One popular promotion is the WGNI Beach Bag. Each Summer (labeled the 102 Days of Summer), GNI gives listeners the chance to call in and win a Beach Bag. The bag is filled with several prizes. Along with popular contesting and music, WGNI provides the community with frequent traffic and weather information. During the Hurricane Season, GNI is "Wilmington's Hurricane Information Station" and provides listeners with around the clock weather coverage.

Like many other adult contemporary stations across the country, WGNI airs 24/7 Christmas music during the holiday season (usually beginning in late November). This is promoted on air as "Wilmington's Original All Christmas Music Station". The format continues through mid-night Christmas Day.
