= WILT (FM) =

- Wrightsville Beach, North Carolina; United States
- Broadcast area: Wilmington, North Carolina
- Frequency: 103.7 MHz
- Branding: Sunny 103.7

Programming
- Format: Adult contemporary

Ownership
- Owner: Capitol Broadcasting Company; (Sunrise Broadcasting, LLC)
- Sister stations: WAZO, WKXB, WMFD, WRMR

History
- First air date: 1977; 49 years ago
- Former call signs: WDZD (1977–1993); WLTT (1993–2003); WBNU (2003–2007); WBNE (2007–2015)
- Former frequencies: 93.5 MHz (1977–1994)

Technical information
- Licensing authority: FCC
- Facility ID: 52023
- Class: C2
- ERP: 22,000 watts
- HAAT: 150.9 meters (495 ft)
- Transmitter coordinates: 34°5′51.64″N 77°58′18.2″W

Links
- Public license information: Public file; LMS
- Webcast: Listen live
- Website: sunny1037.com

WILT (103.7 MHz, "Sunny 103.7") is an FM radio station licensed to Wrightsville Beach, North Carolina, United States. The station serves the Wilmington area. The station is currently owned by Capitol Broadcasting Company, Inc., through licensee Sunrise Broadcasting, LLC.

== History ==
=== 93.7 FM ===
With the original call sign WFXZ-FM, "93.7 The Bone" signed on in November 2000. Owned and operated by Sea-Comm Media Inc., the station was located in the same Wilmington, North Carolina facilities as (modern rock) WSFM-FM "Surf 107" and (rhythmic oldies) WKXB "Jammin 99.9".

=== 103.7 FM ===
Previous logo

WDZD, a country station licensed to Shallotte, North Carolina, was located at 93.5 FM. In 1994, the station increased from 3,000 to 25,000 watts effective radiated power and moved to 103.7 FM. At that time, the call sign was changed to WLTT. The station played soft adult contemporary music for several years, using the names "Love 103.7" and later "Magic 103.7", before switching to modern rock and then talk radio. The call sign WLTT later moved to the former WCCA on 106.3. The 103.7 frequency switched to WBNU and classic rock format of WBNE, on 93.7 FM, which had used the "Bone" name and classic rock format for several years. The WBNE call sign went to WBNU when the 93.7 frequency began simulcasting WLTT. The 103.7 frequency got a signal boost to 35,000 watts and a tower closer to Wilmington, aided by a move by WWTB from 103.9 to 104.1 FM.

On March 17, 2014, WBNE changed their format to news/talk, branded as "Port City Radio" (simulcast with WLTT 1180 AM Carolina Beach, North Carolina).

On January 31, 2015, at midnight WBNE switched to a simulcast of adult alternative-formatted WUIN 98.3 FM Oak Island, North Carolina.

On June 1, 2015, WBNE went silent.

On June 12, 2015, WBNE returned to the air, stunting with a loop of Twiggy Twiggy by Pizzicato Five. On July 3, 2015, the station flipped to Variety Hits as "Big John FM".

In September 2015, Sunrise Broadcasting, a licensee of Capitol Broadcasting Company, announced to acquire WBNE for $1.85 million from Sea-Comm Media & Wilmington Hometown Media. As part of the deal and as per FCC regulation over ownership limits, Sunrise will sell WILT 104.5 to Carolina Christian Radio & move the WILT's AC format & call sign to 103.7 as "Sunny 103.7".

On December 1, 2015, the sale of WILT 104.5 to Carolina Christian Radio was completed along with the acquisition of WBNE by Sunrise; with the WILT callsign & "Sunny" AC format moving over to 103.7 the same day.

In 2026 Curtis Media Group purchased WILT and five other stations from Sunrise Broadcasting for $1.75 million.
