= WDVV =

- Wilmington, North Carolina; United States
- Broadcast area: Wilmington, North Carolina
- Frequency: 89.7 MHz
- Branding: The Word 89.7

Programming
- Format: Christian talk and teaching

Ownership
- Owner: Carolina Christian Radio, Inc.

History
- Call sign meaning: Phonetic sound-alike to dove

Technical information
- Licensing authority: FCC
- Facility ID: 43707
- Class: C3
- ERP: 4,900 watts
- HAAT: 134 meters
- Transmitter coordinates: 34°5′52.00″N 77°58′18.00″W

Links
- Public license information: Public file; LMS
- Webcast: Listen Live
- Website: yourwordradio.com

WDVV (89.7 FM) is a radio station broadcasting a Christian talk and teaching format. Licensed to Wilmington, North Carolina, United States, the station serves the Wilmington area. The station is owned by Carolina Christian Radio, Inc.

== History ==
In the mid-1980s, Dennis Anderson, an owner of several McDonald's franchises, & Michael Escalante started Praise Broadcasting Network Inc. to address the lack of Christian radio in the area. WMYT, a 10,000-watt AM which had been off the air since 1996 (when Hurricane Fran damaged the transmitter site and operations), signed on as the first station in the network with Darryl "Chuck" Langley serving as station manager. In September 1999, 89.7 Dove FM made its debut with "All music, all the time." Program director Al Lanier described the format as starting with "joyous music" as in Psalm 100 followed by softer music for reflection. The music included "upbeat, sing-along church camp favorites," orchestra arrangements, and urban gospel artists such as Andre Murrell. A Spanish language program aired on weekends, and radio stations in Haiti, Sudan and Uganda were planned.

Until late 2021, Carolina Christian Radio of Wilmington, owners of WWIL-FM, aired a blend of Christian praise, worship, and hymns on 89.7 including music from artists such as Robin Mark, Sovereign Grace Music, Hosanna, Darlene Zschech, Chris Tomlin, Travis Cottrell, Keith Getty, Hillsong, Enfield, and Don Moen.

In September 2021 WDVV changed their format from contemporary Christian (which moved to online-only) to Christian talk and teaching, branded as "The Word", format moved from WZDG 88.5 FM Scotts Hill.

== Previous logo ==
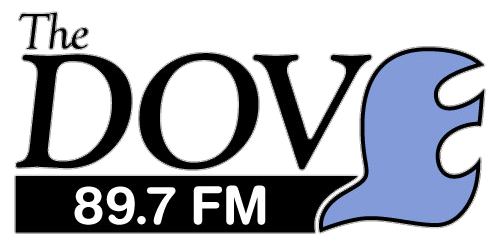
