= WBTZ =

- Plattsburgh, New York; United States
- Broadcast area: Champlain Valley; Greater Montreal
- Frequency: 99.9 MHz
- Branding: The Buzz

Programming
- Format: Alternative rock

Ownership
- Owner: Hall Communications
- Sister stations: WKOL; WOKO; WJOY; WIZN

History
- First air date: February 3, 1960 (as WEAV-FM)
- Former call signs: WEAV-FM (1960–1973); WGFB (1973–1996)

Technical information
- Licensing authority: FCC
- Facility ID: 52807
- Class: C
- ERP: 100,000 watts
- HAAT: 300 meters (980 ft)
- Transmitter coordinates: 44°46′14″N 73°36′47″W

Links
- Public license information: Public file; LMS
- Webcast: Listen live
- Website: www.999thebuzz.com

WBTZ (99.9 MHz "99.9 The Buzz") is a commercial FM radio station in Plattsburgh, New York, and serving the Plattsburgh area, the Burlington, Vermont metropolitan area and Greater Montreal. The station is owned by Hall Communications, and airs an alternative rock radio format. On-air personalities include Pete Powers, Mays, and Johnny Utah. The station also plays the syndicated show Alternative Soundcheck.

WBTZ is one of a handful of stations in New York State with an effective radiated power (ERP) of 100,000 watts as a Class C outlet. The transmitter is located off The Ninety Road in Morrisonville. The studios are in Winooski, Vermont, and offices are in South Burlington.

== History ==
=== Early years as WEAV-FM ===
On February 3, 1960, the station first signed on as WEAV-FM. It was put on the air by the Plattsburgh Broadcasting Company, owned by George F. Bissell, who also served as its General Manager. WEAV-FM was the sister station to WEAV. WEAV-FM simulcasted the full service middle of the road (MOR) music format heard on WEAV.

At the time, WEAV-FM was only powered at 3,700 watts, limited in coverage to the area around Plattsburgh. By the early 1970s, the simulcast ended as the AM station moved to a Top 40 format, while WEAV-FM stayed with MOR and easy listening music that was largely automated.

=== Switch to WGFB ===
On December 24, 1973, the station switched its call sign to WGFB, using owner George F. Bissell's initials. Under the new call letters, WGFB at first continued its easy listening format, but with less chatter than the AM station.

Around 1980, WGFB switched to a mostly automated album rock format, while the AM station continued its Top 40 format with live DJs. As listening to contemporary music moved from AM to FM in the 1980s, the Plattsburgh Broadcasting Company decided to make a change. The Top 40 format moved over to the FM station while the AM station switched to a more adult direction, with a mix of adult contemporary music, talk and news from CBS Radio News.

WGFB called itself "B-100", because on an analog tuner, 99.9 MHz was close enough to FM 100. The power was also increased to 10,100 watts, giving B-100 coverage over the Canada–United States border into Montreal. The station began selling advertising in the much larger Montreal radio market, adding to its profitability, and competing against English-language Top 40 station CKGM (later switching to CHTX). At the time, Canadian rules said repetitive Top 40 formats could only be heard on AM radio and all stations had to play a considerable percentage of Canadian artists. Those rules limited Canadian FM stations to playing many non-hits, giving B-100 an advantage, heard in stereo on FM with all-hit music.

In the early 1990s, WGFB got an even bigger power boost, going to 100,000 watts. That is the maximum power permitted for American FM stations (other than a handful of grandfathered outlets). The height above average terrain also improved to 981 feet (299 m), giving WGFB even better coverage of Montreal, as well as into Burlington and other communities in Vermont. However, the income from Montreal advertisers trailed off when Canada imposed rules that tax deductions for advertising would only be permitted when the ads were placed on Canadian broadcast stations, not ones in the U.S.

With the new rules, WGFB began concentrating mostly on the Burlington-Plattsburgh market in the mid-1990s and flipped to an adult contemporary music format. This was partially via a "Bright AC" satellite format syndicated by Westwood One.

=== 99.9 The Buzz ===
In July 1996 George F. Bissell's daughter Judy became the president of Plattsburgh Broadcasting. Under her leadership, "The Buzz" was launched with a modern rock format and the current call sign WBTZ. (The call letters WBZZ were on a station in Pittsburgh and unavailable to Plattsburgh Broadcasting.)

Stephanie "Monkey" Hindley hosted middays and was the Program Director, Picard was on afternoon drive and was the music director, and Jason Steeves took control at night. "Frenchy Karl" from Montreal and the outspoken "King James" were also DJ's in the early years. Matt Grasso replaced Steeves in late 1997, then in 1998 Kyle Smith joined for morning drive time. Grasso then replaced Smith in morning drive during the middle of 1998. Chip took the night shift in 2000, with Tommy Boy taking the reins in 2001. Then, Ben Wiggins took the night shift in 2002. In 2001 Grasso and Hindley swapped shifts until Hindley left the station in late 2002 and Picard disappeared in early 2003. Wiggins left to pursue an acting career and was replaced by Johnny Utah. Hindley was initially replaced by Brit import Ian Kelly and Kim Napolitano, then shortly after, Pete Powers. Picard was replaced by Christine "Electra" Pawlak, until mid-2004 when she left for a job in Philadelphia and was replaced by Mays from WFNX in Boston. Picard eventually resurfaced on Montreal sports radio station "The Team 990" (now CKGM). Johnny Utah left nights in 2009 and was replaced eventually by Even Steven. In September 2011, Devon McGarry became the night DJ. He left for WIZN and the syndicated show Alternative Soundcheck took the night spot.

The Buzz had two specialty music programs airing Sunday nights from 1996 to 2012, "Homebrew" - an hour of local music and "Early Warning" (at one point called "Spinning Unrest") a two-hour new music show. "Homebrew" was hosted by a number of Buzz DJs over the years, including Ben Wiggins, DJ Llu, the "Homebrew Crew", and Gadous. "Early Warning" began in 1996, hosted by Steve Picard until 2003, then Ben Wiggins for 2004, and finally DJ Llu from 2004 to 2012. In 2012 both programs were discontinued due to budget cuts.

The station was a finalist for Radio & Records magazine's 2006 and 2007 Industry Achievement Awards for best Alternative Station for markets 100 and up. Other finalists included WKZQ-FM, WJSE, KQXR, KXNA, and WSFM.

=== Hall Communications Acquisition ===
In 2001, Clear Channel Communications (now iHeartMedia) bought WEAV. WBTZ was still owned by Plattsburgh Broadcasting, but was operated by Burlington Broadcasters. On November 1, 2005 it was purchased by Hall Communications, which already owned several stations in Vermont and WKOL in Plattsburgh.

WBTZ had the youthful contemporary rock audience to itself in the Burlington-Plattsburgh market, until 2008, when WLFE-FM, later WIER, changed from country music to active rock, calling itself "Pure Rock Radio". Also in 2008, WCPV shifted from classic rock to mainstream rock, giving WBTZ another new competitor. On January 1, 2011, WCPV flipped to all-sports, citing heavy competition in the rock format. The next year, WIER switched to WIXM, a hot adult contemporary station, giving up its rock format. WBTZ remains one of the top stations in the Burlington-Plattsburgh market, with little competition in the contemporary rock field.
