= WKXB =

- Boiling Spring Lakes, North Carolina; United States
- Broadcast area: Wilmington, North Carolina
- Frequency: 99.9 MHz (HD Radio)
- Branding: Jamm♪n 99.9

Programming
- Format: Rhythmic oldies
- Subchannels: HD2: Soft AC; HD3: Sports (WMFD)

Ownership
- Owner: Capitol Broadcasting Company; (Sunrise Broadcasting, LLC)
- Sister stations: WAZO, WILT, WMFD, WRMR

History
- First air date: December 13, 1964
- Former call signs: WPGF-FM (1964–1973); WVBS-FM (1973–1976, 1981–1993); WPJC (1976–1981)

Technical information
- Licensing authority: FCC
- Facility ID: 59481
- Class: C2
- ERP: 26,000 watts
- HAAT: 177 meters (581 ft)
- Transmitter coordinates: 34°5′52.3″N 77°58′17.2″W
- Translator: HD2: 95.9 W240AS (Wilmington)

Links
- Public license information: Public file; LMS
- Webcast: Listen live; Listen live (HD2)
- Website: jammin999fm.com; 959thebreeze.com (HD2)

WKXB (99.9 FM, "Jammin' 99.9") is a rhythmic oldies formatted radio station licensed to Boiling Spring Lakes, North Carolina, and serving the Wilmington, North Carolina area.

== History ==
WKXB launched as WPGF-FM, a sister station to WPGF. It adopted an adult contemporary format as WVBS-FM in the early 1980s. WVBS-FM would flip to a Top 40/CHR format in the mid-1980s named "All Hit B100". In 1993, WVBS-FM dropped its CHR format and became Country-formatted "Kix Country 99.9" with new calls WKXB. In 1999, WKXB again switched formats to Jammin' Oldies as "Jammin 99.9". WKXB more than doubled its audience and became the number one station in the market.

In 2001, WKXB shifted to a more Rhythmic Adult Contemporary format. As of 2012, it has returned to Rhythmic Oldies, predominantly from the 1960s thru 1980s.

In July 2004, NextMedia Group purchased WKXB and WSFM from Sea-Comm Inc., and WRQR, WAZO, and WMFD from Ocean Broadcasting LLC.

In July 2008, Capitol Broadcasting announced its purchase of NextMedia's Wilmington stations.

On March 31, 2010, WKXB reduced its power output from 100,000 watts to 35,000 watts in a transmitter and city of license move from Burgaw, North Carolina to Boiling Spring Lakes, North Carolina to allow a signal boost by co-owned and co-channeled WCMC-FM in the Raleigh market.

In 2026 Curtis Media Group purchased WKXB and five other stations from Capitol Broadcasting's Sunrise Broadcasting for $1.75 million.

=== HD Signal ===
In June 2018, WKXB launched "95.9 The Breeze" on its HD2 signal, as well as on translator W240AS 95.9 FM Wilmington, which had been used by WMFD. The soft adult contemporary format included Chicago, Elton John, Billy Joel, James Taylor, Phil Collins, Hall & Oates, the Eagles, and Lionel Richie.
