= WWHK =

Radio station in Myrtle Beach, South Carolina

- Myrtle Beach, South Carolina; United States
- Broadcast area: Myrtle Beach, South Carolina
- Frequency: 1450 kHz
- Branding: 105.5 Hank FM

Programming
- Format: Currently silent

Ownership
- Owner: Dick Broadcasting; (Dick Broadcasting Company, Inc. of Tennessee)
- Sister stations: WRNN-FM; WYAV; WKZQ-FM; WMYB

History
- First air date: 1965 (as WTGR on 1520 kHz)
- Former call signs: WTGR (1964–1983); WKZQ (1983–2000); WJYR (2000–2002); WQJM (2002–2007); WRNN (2007–2018)
- Former frequencies: 1520 kHz (1965–1996)
- Call sign meaning: Hank

Technical information
- Licensing authority: FCC
- Facility ID: 24775
- Class: C
- Power: 1,000 watts
- Transmitter coordinates: 33°42′20.6″N 78°53′24.1″W
- Translator: 105.5 W288DK (Myrtle Beach)

Links
- Public license information: Public file; LMS

WWHK (1450 kHz) is an AM radio station licensed to Myrtle Beach, South Carolina, United States, serving the Myrtle Beach area, which is currently silent. The previous format was classic country. The station is owned by Dick Broadcasting, through licensee Dick Broadcasting Company, Inc. of Tennessee. Its studios and transmitter are co-located in Myrtle Beach. The station's programming was also heard on FM translator station W288DK (105.5 FM).

== History ==
Ham radio operators started WTGR, a 250-watt station at 1520 AM, in 1965. Tiger Radio became "the hallmark radio station" for Myrtle Beach, playing Top 40 and beach music. DJs included Billy Smith, Bill Hennecy, Big Al Irvin, Bill Connell, Bruce Miller, Steve Mims and J. Patrick Milan.

WTGR began a simulcast of WKZQ-FM 101.7 in the early 1980s and eventually became WKZQ.

Banana Jack Murphy and Bob Scarborough of Waccamaw Media started TigerRadioOnline.com, an Internet radio station, in 2000, with jingles and music from the former WTGR. This station stayed on the air until 2005, operating from Waccamaw Media studios on Wesley Street near Freestyle Music Park.

On December 23, 1996, WKZQ moved to 1450, a frequency vacated in the mid-1980s which once used the letters WMYB, giving the station a nighttime signal (though daytime power was reduced from 5,000 to 1,000 watts), and continuing the FM simulcast, as well as NASCAR. At first, WKZQ played rock. Then it went to sports talk. The station also aired the Atlanta Braves. Tony Kornheiser replaced The Fabulous Sports Babe late in 1999. Also heard on the station at that time were three NFL games each Sunday, Monday Night Football, UNC Tar Heel football and basketball, some East Carolina University games, other Westwood One and CBS college football, and the Charlotte Hornets.

=== Expanded Band assignment ===
On March 17, 1997, the Federal Communications Commission (FCC) announced that 88 stations had been given permission to move to newly available "Expanded Band" transmitting frequencies, ranging from 1610 to 1700 kHz, with WKZQ authorized to move from its old frequency of 1520 to 1620 kHz. A construction permit for the expanded band station, also located in Myrtle Beach, was assigned the call letters WAZG on March 23, 1998. However the expanded band station was never built, and its construction permit was cancelled on January 29, 2001.

=== Later history ===
When NextMedia Group bought the station in 2000, the WJYR letters were moved from 92.1 FM, and most of the station's programming was adult standards from the Music of Your Life network. Since few people listened (other stations played similar music), sports talk returned. In 2002, the call letters changed to WQJM. ESPN Radio aired 24 hours a day prior to August 2002 but remained on the station in the overnight hours and on weekends until February 2003; and talk radio other than sports was part of the format. The station served as a "companion" to talk station WRNN-FM. Programming included the morning show hosted by Dave Priest and Tara Servatius. The AM station also aired The Clark Howard Show and Clemson University games other than ACC.

As WRNN, a portion of its broadcast day was a simulcast of sister station WRNN-FM from 8 p.m. to 6 a.m. on weekdays, and throughout the weekend. WRNN aired Mike Gallagher, Dr. Laura, Clark Howard, Lars Larson, and a local sports talk program during the daytime and evening hours.

On April 25, 2013, WRNN split from its simulcast of the FM and changed its format to sports, with programming from ESPN Radio. Mike & Mike also aired on WKZQ-FM but was heard only on WRNN as of September 2014.

NextMedia sold WRNN and its 32 other radio stations to Digity, LLC for $85 million; the transaction was consummated on February 10, 2014. In 2014, Digity, LLC added the station's first local programming as the station became the new radio home for the Myrtle Beach Pelicans, with Nathan Barnett calling the games. Effective February 25, 2016, Digity, LLC and its 124 radio stations were acquired by Alpha Media for $264 million.

On August 30, 2017, WRNN dropped the ESPN sports format and began stunting with TV themes as "TV on Radio 105.5", utilizing the addition of a simulcast on FM via translator W288DK. The following day, the stunt shifted to a loop of "Nuthin' but a 'G' Thang" by Snoop Dogg and Dr. Dre. On September 1, 2017, at 10:55 a.m., WRNN and W288DK flipped to classic hip hop as "G105.5". The first song on G was "This Is How We Do It" by Montell Jordan. For several months in 2018, W288DK was unable to broadcast because of technical problems that affected WYAV.

In September 2017, Dick Broadcasting announced the purchase of Alpha Media stations in three markets — 18 stations and two translators in total, at a purchase price of $19.5 million. The acquisition of WRNN by Dick Broadcasting was consummated on December 20, 2017.

On April 23, 2018, the station changed its call sign to WWHK. On May 25, 2018, at 3 p.m., after briefly stunting with a loop of "End of the Road" by Boyz II Men, WWHK and W288DK flipped to classic country as "105.5 Hank FM".

On December 24, 2025, W288DK filed for a silent STA. On February 12, 2026, Radioinsight reported both WWHK and W288DK went off the air. WYAV needed to use the W288DK antenna due to technical problems, and the AM is now off the air "due to financial constraints".
