= WKXS-FM =

Radio station in North Carolina

- Leland, North Carolina; United States
- Broadcast area: Wilmington, North Carolina
- Frequency: 94.5 MHz
- Branding: 94.5 The Hawk

Programming
- Format: Classic rock
- Affiliations: Westwood One

Ownership
- Owner: Cumulus Media; (Cumulus Licensing LLC)
- Sister stations: WGNI, WMNX, WWQQ-FM

History
- First air date: February 11, 1994 (as WAHG-FM at 94.1)
- Former call signs: WAAV-FM (4/1/1994-3/8/2000); WAHG (2/11/1994-4/1/1994)
- Former frequencies: 94.1 MHz (1994–2006)

Technical information
- Licensing authority: FCC
- Facility ID: 25998
- Class: A
- ERP: 3,800 watts
- HAAT: 126.7 meters
- Transmitter coordinates: 34°12′35″N 77°56′53″W

Links
- Public license information: Public file; LMS
- Webcast: Listen live Listen Live via iHeart
- Website: 945thehawkradio.com

WKXS-FM (94.5 MHz) is a radio station broadcasting a classic rock format and airing The Bob & Tom Show in the morning. Licensed to Leland, North Carolina, United States, the station serves the Wilmington area. The station is currently owned by Cumulus Media.

== History ==
WKXS-FM signed on the air on February 11, 1994 as WAHG. Cumulus Broadcasting purchased four Wilmington radio stations in Spring 1997. After a survey, general manager Clay McCauley said, "Basically, we found a hole in the market big enough to drive a Mack truck through." 25 percent of the market's population was African-American, but only one radio station was reaching that audience.

On Friday, October 3, 1997, WAAV-FM began repeatedly playing "Kiss" by Prince. The new Kiss 94.1 was "All Prince, All the Time" until program director Ken Johnson (from WILD in Boston) played "If Only for One Night" by Luther Vandross on Monday, October 6. The new urban adult contemporary format would include Toni Braxton, Whitney Houston, Anita Baker and Michael Jackson. The target audience would be similar to that of 97.3 Coast FM, which had been the area's only urban contemporary station since 1992. However, Kiss would lean more toward older songs, and the station would not play rap. Local DJs and community involvement were a priority, and Tom Joyner did the morning show.

On March 8, 2000, the call letters changed to WKXS-FM.

Logo under the classic hits format

Kiss received a signal improvement that included a move to 94.5. Still, because of low ratings, the format that included Teddy Pendergrass and Aretha Franklin was changed to classic rock on September 21, 2006. The first song was "Take the Money and Run" by the Steve Miller Band. In December 2006, the station added John Boy and Billy, who had been under contract with WRQR. The station transitioned to full classic rock in 2017.
