= WKOL =

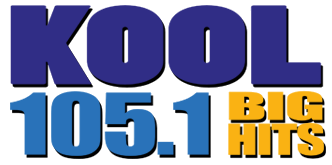
- Plattsburgh, New York; United States
- Broadcast area: Burlington, Vermont / Plattsburgh, New York
- Frequency: 105.1 MHz
- Branding: Kool 105.1 Big Hits

Programming
- Format: Classic hits
- Affiliations: Compass Media Networks; Premiere Networks

Ownership
- Owner: Hall Communications
- Sister stations: WBTZ, WOKO, WJOY, WIZN

History
- First air date: August 22, 1994; 31 years ago (as WEXP-FM)
- Former call signs: WAEE (1993–1994); WEXP-FM (1994–1995)
- Call sign meaning: "Kool"

Technical information
- Licensing authority: FCC
- Facility ID: 68692
- Class: C3
- ERP: 23,500 watts
- HAAT: 103 meters (338 ft)
- Transmitter coordinates: 44°31′31.1″N 73°31′5.4″W

Links
- Public license information: Public file; LMS
- Webcast: Listen Live
- Website: wkol.com

WKOL (105.1 FM; "Kool 105.1") is a radio station broadcasting a classic hits format. The station, which signed on in 1994 as WEXP-FM, is licensed to Plattsburgh, New York, United States, and serves the Burlington / Plattsburgh area. WKOL is owned by Hall Communications, Inc.

== History ==
The station was assigned the call letters WAEE on July 23, 1993; on March 18, 1994, the station changed its call sign to WEXP-FM. The station signed on August 22, 1994, with an album-oriented rock and adult album alternative format under the ownership of UBC Inc. and branded as "Experience 105.1". After UBC ran into financial problems, Hall Communications, owner of WOKO and WJOY in Burlington, agreed to purchase WEXP-FM in February 1995 and assumed control on June 13, 1995; on that date, the station was assigned its present WKOL call sign. "Experience 105.1" programming ended on June 15, 1995; on June 22, WKOL returned to the air as "Kool 105" with an oldies format.
