= WZDG =

- Scotts Hill, North Carolina; United States
- Broadcast area: Wilmington, North Carolina
- Frequency: 88.5 MHz
- Branding: Hope Radio

Programming
- Format: Southern gospel

Ownership
- Owner: Carolina Christian Radio Inc.

Technical information
- Licensing authority: FCC
- Facility ID: 88327
- Class: C3
- ERP: 8,900 Watts (vertical)
- HAAT: 166 meters (vertical)
- Transmitter coordinates: 34°30′07″N 78°04′58″W

Links
- Public license information: Public file; LMS
- Webcast: Listen Live
- Website: yourhoperadio.com

WZDG (88.5 FM) is a radio station broadcasting a southern gospel format. Licensed to Scotts Hill, North Carolina, United States, it serves the Eastern North Carolina area. The station is currently owned by Carolina Christian Radio Inc.

WZDG was a Christian rock station known as "The Edge", with the morning show The Dive with Scott and Earl. However, a drop in donations, especially the loss of one large donor, led to the change on November 12, 2012, to Christian talk and teaching, with programming previously heard on WMYT.

In September 2021, WZDG changed their format from Christian talk (which moved to WDVV 89.7 FM Wilmington) to southern gospel, branded as Hope Radio".
