= WMNX =

- Wilmington, North Carolina; United States
- Broadcast area: Wilmington Metro
- Frequency: 97.3 MHz
- Branding: Coast 97.3

Programming
- Format: Mainstream urban
- Affiliations: Premiere Networks

Ownership
- Owner: Cumulus Media; (Cumulus Licensing LLC)
- Sister stations: WAAV, WGNI, WKXS-FM, WWQQ-FM

History
- First air date: February 24, 1970 (as WHSL-FM)
- Former call signs: WHSL-FM (1970–1989); WMFD-FM (1989–1990)

Technical information
- Licensing authority: FCC
- Facility ID: 8584
- Class: C1
- ERP: 100,000 watts
- HAAT: 269.3 meters
- Transmitter coordinates: 34°03′6.6″N 78°04′56″W

Links
- Public license information: Public file; LMS
- Webcast: Listen live
- Website: coast973.com

WMNX (97.3 FM) is a mainstream urban formatted broadcast radio station licensed to Wilmington, North Carolina and serving the Wilmington Metro area.

== History ==
97.3 started in 1970 as WHSL-FM, sister station to AM 1490 WHSL. During the 1970s and 1980s, album-oriented rock WHSL played "more than just the hits". In the late 1980s, WHSL shifted to soft adult contemporary music during the day and smooth jazz in the evening, with calls WMFD-FM and later WMNX. In 1992, it switched to mainstream urban and began using the branding "Coast 97.3". In 1999, Cape Fear Broadcasting announced the sale of its six stations to Cumulus Broadcasting. The sale was challenged by Ocean Broadcasting of Wilmington because it would give Cumulus 6 FMs and an AM in Wilmington, and about 55 percent of market revenue. Today, WMNX airs a mainstream urban format.
