= WMYB (FM) =

Radio station in Myrtle Beach, South Carolina

- Myrtle Beach, South Carolina; United States
- Broadcast area: Myrtle Beach, South Carolina
- Frequency: 92.1 MHz
- Branding: Energy 92.1

Programming
- Format: Top 40 (CHR)

Ownership
- Owner: Dick Broadcasting; (Dick Broadcasting Company, Inc. of Tennessee)
- Sister stations: WRNN-FM; WYAV; WKZQ-FM; WWHK

History
- First air date: January 11, 1965
- Former call signs: WMYB-FM (1965–1979); WXTL (1979–1981); WJYR (1981–2000)
- Call sign meaning: Myrtle Beach

Technical information
- Facility ID: 27265
- Class: C1
- ERP: 94,000 watts
- HAAT: 263 meters (863 ft)
- Transmitter coordinates: 33°35′27.6″N 79°2′54.1″W

Links
- Webcast: Listen live
- Website: www.energy921.com

WMYB (92.1 MHz) is a rhythmic top 40 (CHR) FM radio station licensed to Myrtle Beach, South Carolina. It serves the Florence and Myrtle Beach areas. The station is licensed by the Federal Communications Commission (FCC) to broadcast with an effective radiated power (ERP) of 94 kW. The station goes by the name "Energy 92.1". Its studios are located in Myrtle Beach, and its transmitter is located in Murrells Inlet.

== History ==
WMYB-FM signed on January 11, 1965, with 3,000 watts simulcasting sister station WMYB (1450 AM)'s "Good Music" (American Songbook) format in mono. WMYB-FM played country music for a while. Later, the station switched to disco with the call sign WXTL. For nearly two decades the station was WJYR "Joy 92", playing beautiful music, which added more and more vocals during the 1990s. As of 1997, WJYR was the #3 station in the market. By 1999, WJYR had added Delilah. When NextMedia Group bought the station from Hirsh Broadcasting Group in 2000, WJYR was #1. However, the adult contemporary format and WMYB callsign of "Star 99.5" were moved temporarily to 94.5 and then to 92.1, which had a 50,000-watt signal at the time compared to 25,000 watts for 99.5.

WMYB changed to hot adult contemporary in 2008. Its morning hosts have included Chuck Boozer and Ace and TJ. The slogan was "Today's Music".

NextMedia sold WMYB and its 32 other radio stations to Digity, LLC for $85 million, in a transaction that was consummated on February 10, 2014. Effective February 25, 2016, Digity, LLC and its 124 radio stations were acquired by Alpha Media for $264 million.

After its Nielsen ratings fell from 3.6 to 2.4 in Spring 2016 due to competition from adult contemporary WYEZ, WMYB changed its name to "Christmas Star" and began stunting with Christmas music on September 12 before a switch to contemporary hit radio at 9 a.m. on September 15. "Energy" launched with Sia's "The Greatest" featuring Kendrick Lamar. A month and a half later, WMYB added "Brooke & Jubal in the Morning" in morning drive.

In September 2017, Dick Broadcasting announced the purchase of Alpha Media stations in three markets — 18 stations and two translators in total, at a purchase price of $19.5 million. The acquisition of WMYB by Dick Broadcasting was consummated on December 20, 2017.

After the 2022 Russian invasion of Ukraine, WMYB became "Ukraine 92.1" for the first weekend in March, with comments from Ukrainians living in the area and information on how to help.

== Film appearances ==
WMYB-FM was referenced in the 2005 film Good Night, and Good Luck, a film about communism in the U.S.
