= Floydian Slip =

- Genre: Pink Floyd; Classic Rock; Rock
- Running time: 1 hour
- Country of origin: United States
- Language: English
- Syndicates: Yes
- Hosted by: Craig Bailey
- Recording studio: Shelburne, Vermont
- Original release: 1989 – Present
- Audio format: Stereo
- Website: floydianslip.com

Floydian Slip is a weekly, one-hour syndicated radio program produced by Random Precision Media LLC (RPM), exclusively devoted to the music and history of the British rock band Pink Floyd. The show has an affiliate base of around one hundred stations.

== History ==
The show is created and hosted by Craig Bailey of Shelburne, Vermont, who aired his first episode in January 1989 on Ithaca College's carrier current station 106-VIC (now called VIC Radio) in Ithaca, N.Y., as a senior Television-Radio major at the college. He also produced it for Burlington's short-lived WEXP-FM (105.1) in 1994, and for more than 13 years at WCPV (101.3) until June 7, 2009. In August 2009, Bailey began marketing the show to stations as a weekly syndicated offering, creating RPM to do so.

== Sources ==
- "DJ turns college pastime into 30-year Pink Floyd passion project". WCAX TV.
- Picard, Ken. "Talking Pink With 'Floydian Slip' Producer Craig Bailey". Seven Days.
- "Pink Floyd Show Offered In Syndication". All Access.
- "WRBA Adds Pink Floyd Show". AllAccess.
- "Floydian Slip: Floydian Slip: Internet radio show keeps classic rock band's spirit alive". Champlain Business Journal. May 11, 2010.
- Lopez-Reyes, Ed. "Q&A with Floydian Slip host Craig Bailey". Brain Damage.
- "A One-Man Labor-of-Love". Home Business Magazine. March–April 2014. p. 54.
- Anthony, Ken. "10 Questions with Craig Bailey". AllAccess.com.
