= WAZO =

- Southport, North Carolina; United States
- Broadcast area: Wilmington, North Carolina
- Frequency: 107.5 MHz
- Branding: Z1075

Programming
- Format: Top 40 (CHR)
- Affiliations: Premiere Networks

Ownership
- Owner: Sunrise Broadcasting, LLC
- Sister stations: WKXB, WILT, WMFD, WRMR

History
- First air date: April 15, 1978 (as WLCF at 107.1)
- Former call signs: WLCF (1978–1983); WJYW (1983–1988); WSFM (1988–2004)
- Former frequencies: 107.1 MHz (1978–1988)

Technical information
- Licensing authority: FCC
- Facility ID: 59480
- Class: C2
- ERP: 21,000 watts
- HAAT: 234 meters
- Transmitter coordinates: 34°14′37″N 78°07′24″W

Links
- Public license information: Public file; LMS
- Webcast: Listen Live
- Website: z1075.com

WAZO (107.5 FM, "Z107.5") is a radio station broadcasting a Top 40 (CHR) format. Licensed to Southport, North Carolina, United States, the station serves the Wilmington area. WAZO is currently owned by Sunrise Broadcasting, LLC.

== History ==
For many years, WJYW "Joy 107" in Southport, North Carolina, played beautiful music. The format had a negative reputation as one intended only for older listeners, intended only as background music.

In February 1986, Will Bowen became WJYW station manager, and soon the station was successful with a new version of easy listening music, with "ultra-contemporary" from Bonneville Broadcasting replacing "matched flow". The target audience was 25–54, with more vocals and more instrumental versions of newer songs. The station also had more live DJs. Bowen said, "We're not an easy listening station. We're a radio station that happens to play easy listening music."

In 1986, the "Year of Relaxation" won WJYW a national award for creativity. Owner Atlantic Broadcasting, which took over the station when it was having problems, asked for a power increase from 3,000 to 50,000 watts. By this time, the station offices were in Wilmington.

In the late 1980s, WJYW changed its name to WSFM "Surf 107.5", and changed its format to album oriented rock. During the 1990s, Surf 107.5 changed to alternative rock.

The local "Morning Disaster with Bryan & Jim," featuring Bryan Keith and Jim Whitmeyer, aired on WSFM for more than ten years. Then owner Sea-Comm moved the show to Classic Rock sister WBNE when Surf signed the syndicated "Lex and Terry".

In July 2004, NextMedia Group purchased WRQR, WAZO, and WMFD from Ocean Broadcasting, and WKXB and WSFM from Sea-Comm Inc. The sale meant WSFM and WAZO would trade frequencies. JoJo, Jamie and Flave of WERO (Bob 93.3) (also owned by NextMedia at the time) in Greenville, North Carolina joined what was now Z1075.

In July 2008, Capitol Broadcasting announced its purchase of NextMedia's Wilmington stations.

On July 31, 2009, the station increased effective radiated power to 75,000 watts.

In 2026 Curtis Media Group purchased WAZO and five other stations from Capitol Broadcasting's Sunrise Broadcasting for $1.75 million.
