= WWIL-FM =

- Wilmington, North Carolina; United States
- Broadcast area: Wilmington, Jacksonville, North Myrtle Beach
- Frequency: 90.5 MHz
- Branding: Life 90.5 FM

Programming
- Format: Contemporary Christian music

Ownership
- Owner: Carolina Christian Radio, Inc.
- Sister stations: WDVV, WZDG

History
- First air date: December 1995
- Call sign meaning: Winning Wilmington In Love

Technical information
- Licensing authority: FCC
- Facility ID: 12165
- Class: C3
- ERP: 31,000 watts
- HAAT: 189 meters (620 ft)
- Transmitter coordinates: 34°14′17.6″N 78°7′23″W

Links
- Public license information: Public file; LMS
- Webcast: Listen live
- Website: www.life905.com

WWIL-FM (Life 90.5 FM) is a radio station broadcasting a contemporary Christian music format. Licensed to Wilmington, North Carolina, United States, the station serves the Wilmington, Jacksonville and North Myrtle Beach areas. The station is owned by Carolina Christian Radio, Inc, a 501c3 organization. Carolina Christian Radio is funded by the generous donations of individual listeners.

== History ==
Family Radio Network purchased WWIL (1490 AM) in 1993 and, while the station struggled at first, the station was soon doing so well that Jim Stephens planned an FM station.

WWIL-FM signed on in 1995 with 20,000 watts and a contemporary Christian music format that included Sandi Patti, Michael W. Smith, Wayne Watson and First Call as well as talk show hosts Chuck Colson, D. James Kennedy, Joni Eareckson Tada and Chuck Swindoll.
