= WCSE (AM) =

Radio station in Myrtle Beach, South Carolina (1948–1996)

- Myrtle Beach, South Carolina; United States
- Frequency: 1450 kHz

Ownership
- Owner: Incomm Corp.

History
- First air date: June 10, 1948
- Last air date: March 1988
- Former call signs: WMRA (1948–1952); WMYB (1954–1982); WQOK (1982–1985); WCSE (1985–1987); WKEL (1987–1996)

Technical information
- Facility ID: 49992
- Power: 1,000 watts

WCSE was a radio station on 1450 kHz in Myrtle Beach, South Carolina, that began broadcasting in 1948. It was deleted, as WKEL, in 1996, following a long period when it was off the air.

== History ==
WMRA went on the air on June 10, 1948. It was owned by the Myrtle Beach Broadcasting Company and broadcast with 250 watts from studios in the Ocean Front Hotel. Not long after going on the air, Joe C. Ivey sold control of the company to P. T. Watson and L. B. Hyman. A year later, they sold the station to Elizabeth Evans. In 1954, the Coastal Carolina Broadcasting Corporation, a group of three former CBS announcers, acquired WMRA for $28,000 and changed its call sign to WMYB on July 29, 1954. Coastal Carolina also attempted to move the station to a higher-power frequency twice, in 1955 and 1959, attempts that ultimately went nowhere. In 1961, WMYB was sold to the Golden Strand Broadcasting Company for $150,000; that year, the station was approved for a daytime power increase to 1,000 watts. Golden Strand was acquired in 1964 by Clarence McRae Smith, Jr. and John T. Stanko, after having been granted a construction permit for an FM station on 92.1 MHz earlier that year. On January 11, 1965, WMYB-FM signed on the air; in 1976, the station aired middle-of-the-road music.

Tom Fowler, later vice president for radio with South Carolina Educational Television, made his debut on WMYB the night of the 1967 fire that killed three Apollo 1 astronauts. In 2002, he said, "The Teletypes went nuts. I thought we were at war. That was the real start of an adventure."

Smith and Stanko sold WMYB-AM-FM in 1981 to Rawley Communications Corporation for $700,000, starting a decade that featured two more station sales; WMYB became WQOK in 1982. PhDian Communications, Inc. spent $318,750 to acquire WQOK AM in 1983, separating it from the FM, only to have transfer of control change a year later. Ocean Properties Management of Myrtle Beach, controlled by Wayne A. Thomas and Thomas E. Loehr, acquired the station for $250,000 in 1985 and changed its call sign to WCSE.

Ocean did not own WCSE, by this point an adult standards station (with a format from the Satellite Music Network) with Atlanta Braves baseball and Clemson Tigers football coverage, very long before pursuing a sale. The format was oldies in 1985. On November 13, 1986, the station was put up for auction; in March 1987, the station went silent. Keith E. Lamonica attempted to buy the station in 1987; he began operating it on November 20 and had the call sign changed to WKEL, taking after his initials. During his four months of running the station, WKEL's programming included a simulcast of the satellite feed of CIRK-FM in Edmonton; CNN Headline News; and the Satellite Music Network; none of these formats were successful, and the Federal Communications Commission (FCC) never approved Lamonica's purchase of the station. In early March 1988, WKEL ceased operations; although ownership remained with Thomas and Loehr, the call sign remained WKEL for the remainder of the license's existence.

Ocean tried to sell WKEL again, in May 1988, to no avail. The station was still silent by the time the National Association of Broadcasters wrote a letter to the FCC on May 29, 1992, regarding media ownership rules. When WKEL's license was finally canceled in January 1996, the other AM station in Myrtle Beach, daytime-only WKZQ at 1520, filed to relocate to the 1450 facility; WKZQ signed on at 1450 kHz on December 23, 1996, increasing their nighttime power. Most recently, it was WWHK.
