= WNTB =

- Topsail Beach, North Carolina, U.S.; United States
- Broadcast area: Wilmington, North Carolina, U.S.
- Frequency: 93.7 MHz (HD Radio)
- Branding: 93.7 The Dude

Programming
- Format: Country
- Subchannels: HD2: WUIN simulcast

Ownership
- Owner: Davis Media, LLC
- Sister stations: WUIN

History
- Former call signs: WFXZ (2000–2003); WBNE (2003–2007)
- Call sign meaning: Topsail Beach

Technical information
- Licensing authority: FCC
- Facility ID: 73954
- Class: A
- Power: 6,000 watts
- HAAT: 99.9 meters (328 ft)
- Transmitter coordinates: 34°18′4″N 77°48′7″W

Links
- Public license information: Public file; LMS
- Website: gottalovethedude.com

WNTB (93.7 FM) is an American radio station. Licensed to Topsail Beach, North Carolina, US, it serves the Wilmington, North Carolina area.

The 93.7 frequency was previously home to WBNE ("The Bone"), later at 103.7 FM.

From 2007 to 2020 WNTB simulcast WLTT, later WUDE. The Big Talker was a Fox News Radio affiliate. WNTB and WLTT 106.3 FM, Bolivia, simulcast to five counties in southeastern North Carolina as part of the Sea-Comm Media station group.

The station was owned by Sea-Comm, Inc.
