= Boiling Spring Lakes, North Carolina =

- City
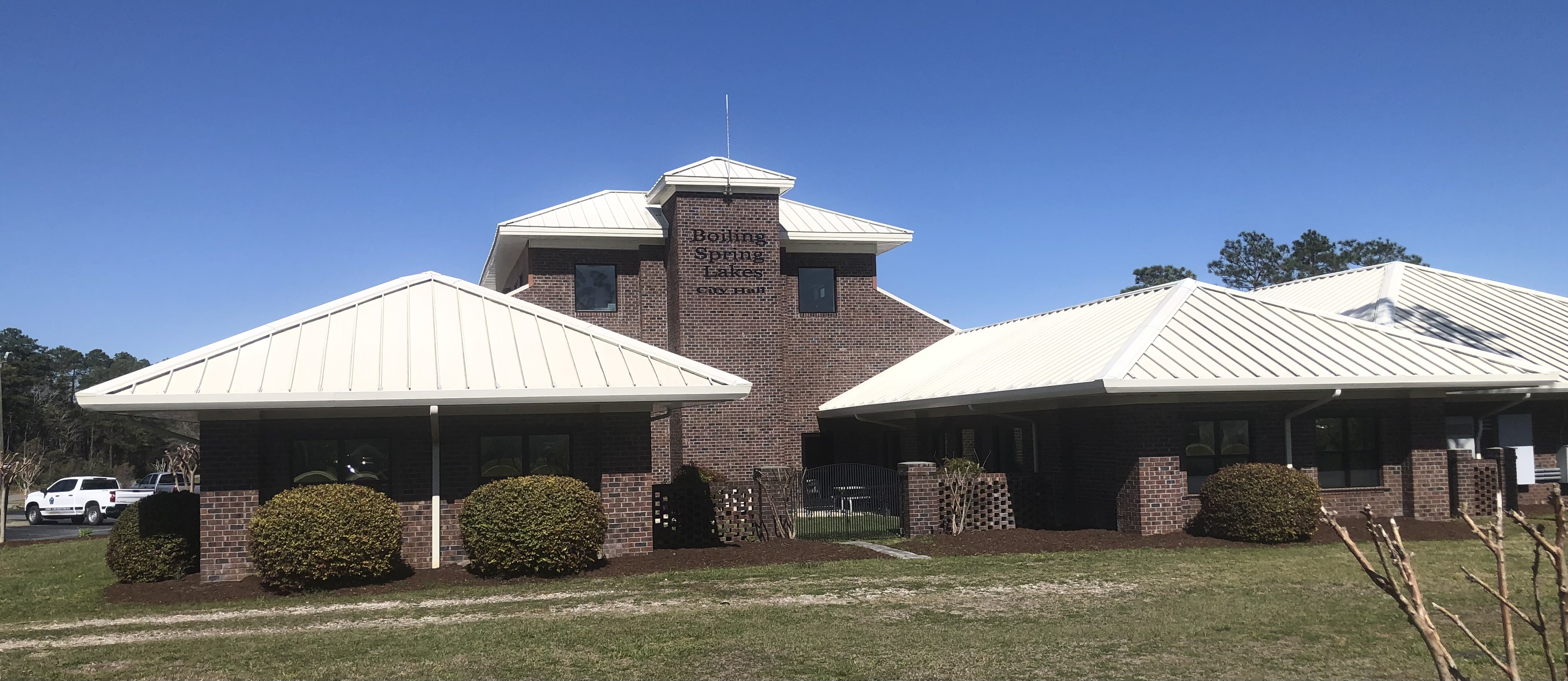
- Boiling Spring Lakes City hall

- Seal

- Location within the state of North Carolina
- Coordinates: 34°01′58″N 78°04′07″W
- Country: United States
- State: North Carolina
- County: Brunswick

Area
  - Total: 24.78 sq mi (64.19 km^{2})
  - Land: 24.09 sq mi (62.40 km^{2})
  - Water: 0.69 sq mi (1.79 km^{2})
- Elevation: 49 ft (15 m)

Population (2020)
  - Total: 5,943
  - Density: 246.7/sq mi (95.24/km^{2})
- Time zone: UTC-5 (Eastern (EST))
  - Summer (DST): UTC-4 (EDT)
- ZIP code: 28461
- Area codes: 910, 472
- FIPS code: 37-06760
- GNIS feature ID: 2403889
- Website: www.cityofbsl.org

Boiling Spring Lakes is a city in Brunswick County, North Carolina, United States. The population was 5,943 at the 2020 census, up from 5,372 in 2010.

== History ==
Boiling Spring Lakes was incorporated as a town in 1961.

The town derives its name from the nearly 50 springs and lakes in the area. The main spring, Boiling Spring, discharges approximately 43 million gallons of water per day.

In 2018 Hurricane Florence damaged roads in Boiling Spring Lakes and destroyed the dam holding back the main lake in the area. FEMA money has been allotted to repair this. As of June 2024, construction is under way to make these repairs.

== Geography ==
North Carolina Highway 87 passes north–south through the center of the community. The city of Wilmington is 22 miles (35 km) to the northeast via NC-87 and US-17. Caswell Beach and Oak Island on the Atlantic Ocean are 11 miles (18 km) to the south.

According to the United States Census Bureau, Boiling Spring Lakes has a total area of 24.0 square miles (62.1 km^{2}), of which 23.3 square miles (60.3 km^{2}) is land and 0.69 square miles (1.8 km^{2}), or 2.90%, is water.

== Demographics ==
Historical population
Census	Pop.	Note	%±
1970	245		—
1980	998		307.3%
1990	1,650		65.3%
2000	2,972		80.1%
2010	5,372		80.8%
2020	5,943		10.6%
2025 (est.)	6,875	▲	15.7%
U.S. Decennial Census

=== 2020 census ===
As of the 2020 census, there were 5,943 people, 2,403 households, and 1,642 families residing in the city.

The median age was 45.5 years. 19.8% of residents were under the age of 18 and 20.5% of residents were 65 years of age or older. For every 100 females, there were 96.9 males, and for every 100 females age 18 and over, there were 92.9 males age 18 and over.

0.0% of residents lived in urban areas, while 100.0% lived in rural areas.

Of households in Boiling Spring Lakes, 27.8% had children under the age of 18 living in them. Of all households, 54.2% were married-couple households, 15.5% were households with a male householder and no spouse or partner present, and 22.9% were households with a female householder and no spouse or partner present. About 22.7% of all households were made up of individuals, and 11.3% had someone living alone who was 65 years of age or older.

There were 2,605 housing units, of which 7.8% were vacant. The homeowner vacancy rate was 1.8% and the rental vacancy rate was 2.5%.

Boiling Spring Lakes racial composition
Race	Number	Percentage
White (non-Hispanic)	5,049	84.96%
Black or African American (non-Hispanic)	210	3.53%
Native American	34	0.57%
Asian	29	0.49%
Pacific Islander	4	0.07%
Other/Mixed	395	6.65%
Hispanic or Latino	222	3.74%

=== 2000 census ===
As of the census of 2000, there were 2,972 people, 1,208 households, and 941 families residing in the city. The population density was 131.5 inhabitants per square mile (50.8/km^{2}). There were 1,409 housing units at an average density of 62.3 per square mile (24.1/km^{2}). The racial makeup of the city was 94.55% White, 3.26% African American, 0.67% Native American, 0.34% Asian, 0.10% from other races, and 1.08% from two or more races. Hispanic or Latino of any race were 0.61% of the population.

There were 1,208 households, out of which 28.7% had children under the age of 18 living with them, 64.6% were married couples living together, 9.1% had a female householder with no husband present, and 22.1% were non-families. 17.5% of all households were made up of individuals, and 7.2% had someone living alone who was 65 years of age or older. The average household size was 2.46 and the average family size was 2.73.

In the city, the population was spread out, with 22.0% under the age of 18, 6.0% from 18 to 24, 29.2% from 25 to 44, 27.4% from 45 to 64, and 15.3% who were 65 years of age or older. The median age was 40 years. For every 100 females, there were 96.2 males. For every 100 females age 18 and over, there were 97.4 males.

The median income for a household in the city was $37,165, and the median income for a family was $40,810. Males had a median income of $31,992 versus $21,667 for females. The per capita income for the city was $18,079. About 8.1% of families and 9.5% of the population were below the poverty line, including 11.8% of those under age 18 and 7.6% of those age 65 or over.
