= WRNN-FM =

- Socastee, South Carolina; United States
- Broadcast area: Myrtle Beach, South Carolina
- Frequency: 99.5 MHz
- Branding: Hot Talk WRNN

Programming
- Format: News/talk
- Affiliations: Fox News Radio; Premiere Networks; Westwood One

Ownership
- Owner: Dick Broadcasting; (Dick Broadcasting Company, Inc. of Tennessee)
- Sister stations: WKZQ-FM; WMYB; WWHK; WYAV

History
- First air date: April 7, 1991
- Former call signs: WMYB (1991–2000)

Technical information
- Licensing authority: FCC
- Facility ID: 53949
- Class: C3
- ERP: 21,500 watts
- HAAT: 108 meters (354 ft)
- Transmitter coordinates: 33°43′17.6″N 78°53′43.1″W

Links
- Public license information: Public file; LMS
- Webcast: Listen live
- Website: www.wrnn.net

WRNN-FM (99.5 MHz) is a news/talk radio station licensed to Socastee, South Carolina, and serves the Grand Strand area. The station is licensed by the Federal Communications Commission (FCC) to broadcast with an effective radiated power (ERP) of 21.5 kW. The station goes by the name Hot Talk WRNN and its current slogan is "The Grand Strand's News Talk Network". Its studios and transmitter are located separately in Myrtle Beach.

The station airs Mike Gallagher, Clay Travis and Buck Sexton, Sean Hannity, Mark Levin, and Rich Valdes. A local morning talk show hosted by Dave Priest & Leanne Graham also airs.

== History of 94.5 FM ==
In early 1991, 94.1 became WKOA-FM, "Coast 94.5". The station was all oldies from the mid-1950s to the mid-1970s. They played many oldies songs that were not being heard on WSYN (Sunny 106.5). WKOA aired commercials stating that they had run a poll ad in the Myrtle Beach Sun News asking readers what kind of new radio station that they would like on the Grand Strand. Coast 94.5 claimed that the overwhelming answer was an oldies station that played a lot of 1950s' and early 1960s' Oldies with old commercials and old T.V. theme songs played also. So, Coast 94.5 was born. However, their playlist was not really very large with a lot of repeats. By September 1992, the station was all talk WRNN-FM and featured the Tom Snyder Show. Don Imus was airing on WRNN prior to the mid-1990s. In 1999, Kim Komando and Stephanie Miller (who replaced Love Phones) joined WRNN's lineup. WRNN also aired the Myrtle Beach Pelicans. Rachel Roberts, promotions director for Pinnacle Broadcasting's Myrtle Beach stations (including WYAV, WYAK, and WMYB), joined Steve Porter in the mornings.

== History of 99.5 FM ==
=== WMYB ===
In 1995, WMYB signed on at 99.5 FM stunting with classic country. Later, WMYB switched to 1970s music. Multi-Market Radio Inc., which had programmed and sold advertising for the station, announced on August 29, 1996, that it had purchased WMYB for $1.1 million from Puritan Radiocasting Co. Then on October 1, 1996, Pinnacle Broadcasting Co., owner of WYAV, announced its purchase of WMYB, WRNN and WYAK.

In December 1996, WMYB switched from 1970s music to adult contemporary music. By 2000, the name had changed from Beach 99.5 to Star 99.5. When NextMedia Group bought WRNN and WMYB in 2000, they traded frequencies because 99.5 FM had a stronger signal, though WMYB moved to 92.1 soon after that. This left the 94.5 frequency vacant until WEZV needed better coverage of the south end of the market, so a simulcast began.

=== WRNN after the switch ===
WRNN-FM had a highly rated early morning talk show with Porter, Priest and Debbie Harwell. On September 21, 2011, NextMedia market manager Barry Brown announced that Porter would no longer be on the show, but would be replaced by Tara Servatius from WBT in Charlotte, North Carolina, who was new in the market. The show started streaming from the website, www.wrnn.net, in 2007 and is drawing listeners from around the country that use Myrtle Beach as their vacation spot or second home area. National, state and local news is discussed on the conservative format with Fox News at the top and bottom of the hour.

On April 25, 2013, WRNN (AM) split from its simulcast of the FM.

Liz Callaway replaced Kristine Ward on September 3, 2013, as co-host for Priest and Pat Taylor after Ward moved to a Charlotte station.

NextMedia sold WRNN-FM and their 32 other radio stations to Digity, LLC for $85 million; the transaction was consummated on February 10, 2014. Effective February 25, 2016, Digity, LLC and its 124 radio stations were acquired by Alpha Media for $264 million.

In September 2017, Dick Broadcasting announced the purchase of Alpha Media stations in three markets — 18 stations and two translators in total, at a purchase price of $19.5 million. The acquisition of WRNN-FM by Dick Broadcasting was consummated on December 20, 2017.

Callaway left WRNN-FM in 2019 to work for the Myrtle Beach Pelicans.
