= WWIL (AM) =

Wilmington, North Carolina; United States
- Frequency: 1490 kHz

Programming
- Format: Gospel

Ownership
- Owner: James and Maxzine Utley; (CLI Radio, LLC)
- Sister stations: WLTT

History
- First air date: 1964
- Last air date: September 2020
- Former call signs: WHSL (1964–1977)
- Call sign meaning: Wilmington

Technical information
- Facility ID: 20662
- Class: C
- Power: 1,000 watts unlimited
- Transmitter coordinates: 34°13′52.6″N 77°57′17″W
- Translator(s): 104.9 W285FQ (Wilmington)

WWIL (1490 AM) was a radio station broadcasting a gospel format, licensed to Wilmington, North Carolina, United States. The station was last owned by James and Maxzine Utley, through licensee CLI Radio, LLC. It operated from 1964 until James Utley's death in 2020.

== History ==
From 1964 to 1977, the station had the call sign WHSL. In 1970, WHSL was joined by a sister F.M. station on 97.3 MHz: WHSL-FM (today’s WMNX).

R. Darryl Davis was host of "Fat Man's Blues Shop" on WWIL; he later played "Blues in the Night" on WHQR.

Family Radio Network Inc. purchased WWIL in 1992 from a Jacksonville church. Before that, the station was R&B. WWIL began calling itself "Family Radio" in 1993. Jim Stephens worked for a Raleigh Christian station but vacationed in Wilmington. When he turned on the radio, he found no Christian stations, so he took over WWIL. Stephens struggled financially after moving to Wilmington but he got numerous cards and letters from people who enjoyed the contemporary Christian music and nationally syndicated ministers. Stephens needed for these listeners to prove their support with cash, and they did. WWIL-FM, a 20,000-watt signal, was added in 1995. As of 1999, the AM station aired "God's Country" during the day, including Ricky Skaggs, The Gatlin Brothers and traditional Southern gospel. At night and early in the morning, the station played urban gospel such as Andrae Crouch and Shirley Caesar.

On August 16, 2022, WWIL’s license was cancelled by the Federal Communications Commission, due to having been silent for more than a year; it and sister station WLTT had not operated since the September 2020 death of owner James Utley Jr. FM translator W285FQ’s license was also cancelled.
