= WRMR (FM) =

- Jacksonville, North Carolina; United States
- Broadcast area: Cape Fear–Wilmington–Jacksonville
- Frequency: 98.7 MHz
- Branding: Modern Rock 98.7

Programming
- Format: Modern rock
- Affiliations: Compass Media Networks

Ownership
- Owner: Sunrise Broadcasting
- Sister stations: WAZO, WILT, WKXB, WMFD

History
- First air date: April 28, 1965; 61 years ago
- Former call signs: WLGD (2008–2011); WILT (2005–2008); WKOO (1989–2005); WRCM-FM (1965–1989)
- Call sign meaning: Modern Rock or Rock Music Radio

Technical information
- Licensing authority: FCC
- Facility ID: 47884
- Class: C1
- ERP: 100,000 watts
- HAAT: 297 meters (974 feet)
- Transmitter coordinates: 34°29′41″N 77°29′19″W

Links
- Public license information: Public file; LMS
- Webcast: Listen live
- Website: www.modernrock987.com

WRMR (98.7 MHz) is an FM radio station broadcasting a modern rock format. Licensed to Jacksonville, North Carolina, United States, the station serves the Wilmington and Jacksonville areas. Since October 2008, the station has been owned by Sunrise Broadcasting, which is a wholly owned subsidiary of Capitol Broadcasting Company of Raleigh, North Carolina, according to FCC filings. The signal can be heard as far south as Myrtle Beach and as far west as Fayetteville.

== History ==
In the 1980s, the station played a country music format as WRCM-FM, ("Country 98.7 FM"). The station switched to an oldies format in 1989 as WKOO ("Kool 98.7").

On April 5, 2005, the format was switched to Westwood One soft adult contemporary ("Lite 98.7"), and the call sign was changed to WILT. The WKOO letters and Westwood One oldies format moved to WANG-FM. Starting July 24, 2006, "Will FM" played adult hits. As of March 31, 2008, the WILT letters and "Will FM" format were moved to the former WRQR in Wilmington.

On March 13, 2008, the call sign was changed to WLGD. La Gran D (The Big One) broadcast a Spanish language format featuring popular music, news, and community programming for an area that had a Hispanic population estimated at over 130,000. WLGD featured local live programming as well as satellite based syndicated programs. Station Manager Jeff Sanchez presented a bilingual talk show on Sunday afternoons, as well as a groundbreaking bilingual show on Wednesday nights at 7 called "Union Cultural" which attempted to bridge the cultural gap between the American and Hispanic communities in the Wilmington area. Every week the music of a different American or English artist was featured, and short bios were presented in English and Spanish to give a context in which to understand the artist's impact.

In July 2008, Capitol Broadcasting Company announced its purchase of NextMedia Group's Wilmington area stations. The sale was completed on October 1, 2008.

However, due to FCC regulations on local ownership, WLGD was placed in a trust managed by Tom Campbell’s Carolina Broadcasting & Publishing Inc. that lasted until 2010 when Capitol sold WSFM to Sea-Comm Media.

On January 3, 2011, "Coastal Carolina's Modern Rock 98.7" debuted, taking the place of WSFM following the sale of that station & subsequent change over to WUIN. Brian Schimmel of Sunrise Broadcasting said the station would focus more on the 1990s than newer songs, and the target audience would be slightly older. The station would focus on the community with local hosts. The format, including commercials, would be "family-friendly".

On January 25, 2011, WLGD changed its call sign to WRMR.

In 2026 Curtis Media Group purchased WRMR and five other stations from Capitol Broadcasting's Sunrise Broadcasting for $1.75 million.
