= WLTT =

- Carolina Beach, North Carolina; United States
- Broadcast area: Wilmington, North Carolina
- Frequency: 1180 kHz
- Branding: Power 107.1

Programming
- Format: Urban adult contemporary
- Affiliations: The Steve Harvey Morning Show

Ownership
- Owner: CLI Radio, LLC
- Sister stations: WWIL

History
- First air date: July 1, 1989 (as WMYT)
- Last air date: September 2020
- Former call signs: WMYT (1987–2011); WUIN (2011); WSFM (2011–2013)

Technical information
- Facility ID: 25586
- Class: D
- Power: 10,000 watts days only
- Transmitter coordinates: 34°9′3.6″N 78°4′47″W
- Translator: 107.1 W296DP (Wilmington)

WLTT (1180 kHz) was an AM radio station licensed to Carolina Beach, North Carolina. The station served the Wilmington, North Carolina radio market with an urban adult contemporary format. The station was last owned by CLI Radio, LLC.

During all of its lifespan, because AM 1180 is a clear-channel frequency reserved for Class A WHAM in Rochester, New York, WLTT was required to sign-off between sunset and sunrise each day to avoid interference. Its transmitter was located off Governors Road Southeast in Winnabow, North Carolina.

== History ==
On July 1, 1989, the station first signed on as WMYT. It began as a religious radio station, owned by Gulfstream Radio.

Later, WMYT was a Spanish-language contemporary Christian station known as "Radio Alegre" (Happiness Radio).

Late in 2010, Brian Schimmel of Sunrise Broadcasting said Sea-Comm Media would buy WMYT from Carolina Christian Radio, which bought the WUIN frequency.

The call sign changed to WUIN on January 1, 2011, and later changed to WSFM on January 11, 2011.

The format changed to classical music with the name "Bach FM". During this time, the station was simulcast on an FM translator station at 95.9 MHz. In 2014, the translator station changed to a rebroadcast of sports radio station WMFD.

On December 2, 2013, WSFM switched to a talk format called Port City Radio previously heard on 93.7 and 106.3 FM. Those FM stations switched to a country music format called "The Dude" at noon.

On December 10, WSFM changed its call letters to WLTT, the former call sign of 106.3 FM.

On March 17, 2014, 103.7 WBNE (now WILT) began simulcasting. WBNE kept the Port City Radio format until 2015, but on October 21, 2014, WLTT changed to a Christian radio format, branded as "Today's Christian Talk 1180". Later, the format switched to Spanish-language shows on weekday mornings and weekends, while Christian instruction and preaching programs were heard on weekday afternoons.

On February 3, 2020, WLTT changed formats from Christian radio to urban adult contemporary, branded as "Power 107.1" (simulcast on FM translator W296DP 107.1 FM Wilmington).

On August 16, 2022, WLTT's license was cancelled by the FCC, due to the station having been silent for more than a year; it and sister station WWIL had not operated since the September 2020 death of owner James Utley Jr. FM translator W296DP’s license was also cancelled.

== See also ==
- List of radio stations in North Carolina
