= WMFD (AM) =

- Wilmington, North Carolina; United States
- Broadcast area: New Hanover County; Brunswick County; Pender County
- Frequency: 630 kHz
- Branding: ESPN Wilmington

Programming
- Format: Sports
- Affiliations: ESPN Radio; Charlotte Hornets; North Carolina Tar Heels; UNC Wilmington Seahawks; Sports USA Radio Network; Westwood One

Ownership
- Owner: Capitol Broadcasting Company
- Sister stations: WAZO, WILT, WKXB, WRMR

History
- First air date: September 15, 1935
- Former frequencies: 1370 kHz (1935–1941); 1400 kHz (1941–1949)

Technical information
- Licensing authority: FCC
- Facility ID: 61701
- Class: B
- Power: 800 watts (day); 1,000 watts (night)
- Transmitter coordinates: 34°16′19″N 77°58′28″W
- Translator: 101.7 W269DF (Wilmington)
- Repeater: 99.9 WKXB-HD3 (Boiling Spring Lakes)

Links
- Public license information: Public file; LMS
- Webcast: Listen live
- Website: espnwilmington.com

WMFD (630 AM) is a commercial radio station licensed to Wilmington, North Carolina, United States. It is owned by the Capitol Broadcasting Company and broadcasts a sports format, primarily from ESPN Radio. The radio studios and offices are on North Kerr Avenue in Wilmington. The transmitter is off Sampson Street in Navassa, North Carolina.

Programming is simulcast on 250-watt FM translator W269DF at 101.7 MHz. WMFD is also heard on the HD Radio digital subchannel of co-owned WKXB-HD3.

== History ==
WMFD signed on the air on September 15, 1935. It is Wilmington's oldest, though not its first, radio station. It has retained its original call sign throughout its history.

In 1954, the station launched WMFD-TV Channel 6, Wilmington's first TV station, now WECT.

In May 1996, Community Broadcasting sold radio stations WMFD, WUOY, and WBMS to a new company called Ocean Broadcasting. As a talk station, WMFD added Dr. Laura Schlessinger and The Fabulous Sports Babe, as well as CNN Headline News part of the time. In 1999, WMFD was airing Don Imus' morning show from New York City.

In 2000, WMFD changed to sports radio and added the minor-league baseball team Wilmington Waves.

In July 2004, NextMedia Group purchased WRQR, WAZO, and WMFD from Ocean Broadcasting, and WKXB and WSFM from Sea-Comm Inc.

In July 2008, Capitol Broadcasting announced its purchase of NextMedia's Wilmington stations.

In 2026 Curtis Media Group purchased WMFD and five other stations from Capitol Broadcasting's Sunrise Broadcasting for $1.75 million.

Former logo

== Translator ==
In addition to the main station, WMFD is relayed by FM translator W269DF 101.7 to widen its broadcast area. This station rebroadcast WLTT prior to 2014.

Call sign	Frequency	City of license	FID	ERP (W)	Class	FCC info
W269DF	101.7 FM	Wilmington, North Carolina	144958	250	D	LMS
