= WFBT (FM) =

Coordinates: 34.0507°N 77.9553°W

Simulcasting WZDG Scotts Hill
- Wilmington, North Carolina; United States
- Broadcast area: Lower Cape Fear, North Carolina
- Frequency: 106.7 MHz
- Branding: Hope Radio

Programming
- Format: Southern gospel
- Affiliations: Premiere Networks; Westwood One

Ownership
- Owner: Carolina Christian Radio Inc.

History
- First air date: February 26, 1993 (as WLGX)
- Former call signs: WLGX (1993–2003); WJZY-FM (2003); WUIN (2003–2011); WMYT (2011–2017)

Technical information
- Licensing authority: FCC
- Facility ID: 34006
- Class: A
- ERP: 5,300 watts Horizontal and 4,631 Vertical
- HAAT: 100 meters (330 ft)

Links
- Public license information: Public file; LMS
- Webcast: Listen Live
- Website: yourhoperadio.com

WFBT (106.7 FM, "Hope Radio"), is a southern gospel radio station that broadcasts out of Wilmington, North Carolina.

== History ==
In 1999, WLGX began playing smooth jazz such as The Rippingtons, Dave Koz and Larry Carlton along with R&B by Anita Baker and Stevie Wonder.

On August 18, 2003, WUIN joined WPPG and became "The Penguin," described as "a different kind of bird" that played "the music you've been waiting for." For the next 2 years the station introduced an eclectic mix to its listeners. Program director Mark Keefe came from WNCW. In this format, Woody Guthrie can be followed by R.L. Burnside, John Prine and Phish, for example. In late August 2005, the program director and music director were relieved of their duties, leaving many to speculate about the future of The Penguin. Within a month Sea-Comm Media had replaced the veteran programmers with Beau Gunn, an untested, but music savvy 23-year-old with no radio programming experience. The move paid dividends, as WUIN enjoyed the highest ratings since its inception. In this eclectic, independently programmed format, listeners would hear deep cut classics from the past, to new cutting edge musicians. Bluegrass, jam, rock, folk, hip hop, and Americana are all fair game. The Penguin celebrated its fifth birthday with a concert at Greenfield Lake Amphitheater. Fans of the radio station enjoyed a sold-out concert by Tift Merritt and Chatham County Line.

In a move rare in the radio industry, the program Flamenco Café" relocated from NPR station WHQR to WUIN. Other original programs on the station were Acoustic Café, Keller's Cellar, Parrott Hour, Saturday Night 'Jam Session', Reggae Redemption, Putumaya's World Music Hour and Great Music Uncorked.

Brian Schimmel of Sunrise Broadcasting said in late 2010 that Sea-Comm Media was buying WSFM 98.3 FM, which became the new radio home for The Penguin. The 106.7 frequency went to Carolina Christian Radio, owners of WMYT.

On January 1, 2011, the callsign changed to WMYT.

Late in 2012, WMYT's owners announced plans to sell 106.7 The Word and move the teaching programming to WZDG.

On July 22, 2013, WMYT became a conservative talk station, My Talker Radio, under LMA by Talk Media TV LLC. Curtis Wright, owner and Executive Producer; George Bell, owner and General Manager; and, Meghan Wright, Program Director, were the principals of the new station. The lineup of shows included a variety of local and nationally syndicated talk shows, including Curtis Wright On The Beat, Glenn Beck, Laura Ingraham, Sean Hannity, America Today with Andy Dean, Coast to Coast AM, Handel on the Law, Joe Pagliarulo, Gary Sullivan, and Leo Laporte. WMYT also obtained a construction permit to reduce its signal from 5,600 to 1,800 watts.

On March 14, 2017, WMYT changed callsigns to WFBT. Chad Adams' Red Wolf Broadcasting took over the LMA and changed its format to "The Big Talker", a format previously heard on WNTB/WLTT. Sports and political commentator Joe Catennaci hosted the morning news and commentary show focusing on the greater Wilmington area. Syndicated programming included Hannity, Dave Ramsey, Mike Gallagher, Dana Loesch, and Coast To Coast AM.

On December 1, 2021, WFBT changed their format from news/talk to a simulcast of southern gospel-formatted WZDG 88.5 FM Scotts Hill, branded as "Hope Radio".

== Awards ==
In 2007, readers of Encore Magazine voted WUIN number one in its market.

== See also ==
- List of radio stations in North Carolina
