= WZGV =

Coordinates: 35°17′30″N 81°34′00″W

Currently silent
- Cramerton, North Carolina; United States
- Broadcast area: Charlotte metropolitan area
- Frequency: 730 kHz
- Branding: Inside The Game

Programming
- Format: Sports gambling
- Affiliations: VSiN; Charlotte Checkers; Charlotte Knights

Ownership
- Owner: Marty Hurney; (2G Media, Inc.)

History
- First air date: August 21, 1946 (as WOHS)
- Former call signs: WOHS (1946–2009)
- Call sign meaning: Aborted station branding of "Groove"

Technical information
- Licensing authority: FCC
- Facility ID: 26179
- Class: D
- Power: 10,000 watts day 190 watts night
- Translator: 97.5 W248CO (Charlotte)

Links
- Public license information: Public file; LMS
- Webcast: Listen Live
- Website: insidethegame.bet

WZGV (730 AM) is a commercial radio station, licensed to Cramerton, North Carolina, and serving the Charlotte metropolitan area. Currently silent, it carried a sports gambling format and is owned by Marty Hurney's 2G Media, Inc. Most programming came from the VSiN Network, with a local afternoon show called "The Afternoon Rush." It was also the exclusive outlet for Charlotte Knights minor league baseball and the Charlotte affiliate for Atlanta Braves baseball, Carolina Hurricanes hockey, and Clemson Tigers football and basketball. The radio studios are on Morehead Street just outside downtown Charlotte.

WZGV’s daytime transmitter power was 10,000 watts, but because 730 AM is a Canadian and Mexican clear channel frequency, WZGV greatly reduced power at night to 190 watts to avoid interference. The transmitter is on Tar Heel Road in Charlotte. Programming was heard around the clock on 250-watt FM translator 97.5 W248CO, also in Charlotte.

== History ==
=== WOHS ===
Robert Wallace formed Western Carolina Radio Corporation in 1945 with the intent to sign on a station in Western North Carolina. He was granted a construction permit for 730 AM with the call sign WOHS. The transmitter was located in Shelby just off Hwy 74 East. The station signed on the air August 21, 1946.

Wallace then turned over the programming to Hugh Dover. Dover was known as the 'Happy Birthday Man' for his daily renditions to whoever was celebrating that particular day. A mainstay of homes in the community, Dover's popular "Carolina in the Morning" show would run 38 years until Dover's semi-retirement in 1984. One popular guest on the show was Cleveland County native and bluegrass music legend, Earl Scruggs. Scruggs and Dover had been childhood friends, growing up in the Flint Hill Community of Cleveland County.

When Don Gibson hosted "Sons of the Soil" in the early 1950s, he told Jonas Bridges, an announcer on the show, that he would write a song that would make him rich. Bridges didn't believe him, but he ended up playing "Oh Lonesome Me" on WKMT in 1957.

Doug Limerick, later an ABC News Radio anchor, worked at WOHS at night while in high school, playing Top 40.

=== New ownership ===
In 1992, Calvin Hastings, who bought WCSL in Cherryville in 1983 and WGNC in Gastonia six years later, bought WOHS and began calling the three stations Piedmont Superstations.

On April 1, 1993, Hastings' KTC Broadcasting took over WLON in Lincolnton in a lease agreement. WLON's Tim Biggerstaff would remain as morning DJ, and his show would be heard on all four KTC stations. News for the entire area would be expanded. The four stations aired UNC-Chapel Hill football and basketball, Dallas Cowboys and Washington Redskins NFL football, and CBS coverage of such events as The World Series and The Super Bowl.

=== Sports broadcasts ===
WCSL, WGNC, WLON, and WOHS began carrying Atlanta Braves baseball in 1993. The Braves are the closest Major League Baseball team to Charlotte.

WOHS added the NFL Carolina Panthers when the team began playing in 1995. It also aired games of the NBA Charlotte Hornets. In 2000, the stations began airing the Redskins again instead of the Panthers (WGNC aired the Panthers if there was no conflict).

Late in 1999, the four stations changed from country music to "Super Oldies." Biggerstaff, the program director, said country had moved away from its traditional sound. Lillie White remained as midday host, and Andy Foster was afternoon host. Local and sports remained important, and the stations aired the One-on-One sports radio network at night.

In 2004, Biggerstaff was still hosting his show on WCSL and WLON despite diabetes-related health problems. Later he moved to Lincolnton-based Hometown Radio's Shelby operation. On WADA he played classic country music and hosted a "Swap Shop" show on WGNC and WOHS. By this time, he had experienced a kidney transplant and two pancreas transplants. On Memorial Day 2007, while on the air, Biggerstaff had a seizure and asked for help on the air, and a listener called 911. He ended up being interviewed by BBC London, Today and People Magazine.

=== WZGV ===
In April 2009, the station was listed as "silent" on the FCC database. HRN bought the dormant license, moved it to Cramerton in Gaston County, and changed its call letters to WZGV in 2009. Another Shelby radio station took the WOHS letters.

WZGV planned to return to the air playing classic hits/oldies as "Groove 730" in February 2010. WOLS morning host Ken Conrad would do mornings, Liz Luke of Magic 96.1 was to be midday host, and Glenn Trent, formerly a radio personality in Asheville, North Carolina, would have the afternoon slot. General manager Lanny Ford said late in February that weather-related "construction delays" were delaying the station's debut to March.

On March 15, 2010, WZGV made its long-awaited debut with its classic hits/oldies format, calling itself was "Z-730." It boosted its power to 10,000 watts from a new transmitter, just northwest of Charlotte, allowing it to easily cover most of the Charlotte area during the day while still remaining within 15 miles of Cramerton as required by FCC regulations. However, at night it must power down to 195 watts to protect a cluster of clear-channel stations, including CKAC in Montreal, Quebec, effectively limiting its coverage to Charlotte itself and eastern Gaston County (Cramerton, Mount Holly, Belmont). To make up for the shortfall in coverage, it operated a low-powered translator at 97.5 FM in Charlotte, W283AR.

=== Switch to sports ===
In August 2010, WZGV became an affiliate of Fox Sports Radio. The oldies format had difficulty attracting advertising because it was a music station on AM, and FM stations had similar music. WZGV moved into Magic 96.1's former studios on Morehead Street, and local shows began September 20. "Bottom Line" was hosted by Lanny Ford with Bill Rosinski of ESPN, Darin Gantt of The Herald and Mike Solarte of News 14 Carolina. "Sports Yapp" with Bryce Johnson moved from WAVO/WTIX. Early in 2011, Richard Walker of The Gaston Gazette began hosting the "Bottom Line" morning show on Tuesdays, Dave Mobley's "The Golf Mob" moved from WFNZ, and Ford announced WZGV would be an Atlanta Braves affiliate.

In its first week a straw poll of listeners conducted by an independent agency found the format of WZGV to be superior to that of WFNZ. The listeners cited professionalism and signal strength as reasons for their decision. In April 2011, WZGV agreed to air Charlotte 49ers basketball and football.

=== ESPN affiliation ===
On August 8, 2011, WZGV switched affiliations to ESPN Radio and rebranded itself as "ESPN 730". The change meant Mike and Mike would air in Charlotte for the first time, while Jim Rome and Dan Patrick would disappear. "The Bottom Line" moved from mornings to afternoons with Rosinski three days, Ford one day, and guest hosts on Fridays. The Herd with Colin Cowherd and The Scott Van Pelt Show would also be part of the schedule.

In 2012, WZGV announced that it would be an Atlanta Braves affiliate once again, but that some games would not air if NASCAR had an event at the same time.

On February 5, 2012, The Sports Sound Off with JT and Kuveikis debuted on WZGV.

=== America's Garage ===
In 2012, WZGV's "America's Garage Radio Show", hosted by Chuck "Crank" Sperry, Chris "Stick" Romeis and "The Car Chick" began national syndication, with affiliates in Greensboro, North Carolina; Arizona and Colorado.

On August 20, 2012, WZGV added David Glenn's Raleigh, North Carolina–based show at noon, and The Sports Pulse, hosted by Mike Pacheco and Rosinski, moved to afternoons. During football season, College Football Preview Show with Ford and Charles Arbuckle aired on Saturday mornings.

Starting in 2012, WZGV aired Charlotte Checkers hockey.

Starting in 2014, WZGV aired Charlotte Knights baseball. The station said it would also air the 2014 Triple-A All-Star Game and the 2014 Gildan Triple-A National Championship Game.

=== New management ===
On February 2, 2015, Lanny Ford, general manager since the station started, and former Carolina Panthers general manager Marty Hurney announced they were leasing WZGV and WZGM in Asheville, North Carolina from HRN. Hurney, also an NFL Insiders analyst, had worked for WZGV since June 2014, co-hosting one show with Al Gardner and later working with Ford. Ford also said some WZGV programs would air on WZGM.

Effective April 20, 2018, HRN Broadcasting, Inc. sold WZGV and its translator W283AR (now W248CO) to Marty Hurney's 2G Media, Inc. for $900,000. Soon after taking control, Hurney rebranded the station as "730 AM the Game."

Starting in 2020, WZGV added Carolina Hurricanes hockey.

=== Sports gambling ===
On July 1, 2025, WZGV switched from ESPN Radio sports talk to sports gambling, branded as "Inside the Game", with programming from the VSiN network.

=== Going silent ===
On June 10, 2026, it was announced that WZGV and its translator would be going silent a week later on June 17, citing both financial constraints and that the land the transmitter towers sat on was being sold and would have to be cleared. Beginning June 17, WZGV and its translator went silent as finances will have to be sorted out and because of a possible relocation of the AM transmitter site.
