= Curly Howard (DJ) =

Howard Sisk (c. 1930 – October 1, 2001), known on the air as Curly Howard, was a disc jockey on several North Carolina (United States) radio stations.

When Howard joined WKMT in Kings Mountain, North Carolina in 1992, he had spent more than 30 years in radio. Of these, 18 were at WKBX in Winston-Salem, North Carolina. He married Jerri September 26, 1966, He had a daughter, Vickie, and four sons, Gary, Ricky, Butch, and Greg. He had three of his five children (Vickie ,Gary, and Ricky) with the late Bulea Wann and Gregg with Jerri.

== Early life ==
Howard grew up in Shelby, North Carolina, with Don Gibson, the country music performer best known for "Oh Lonesome Me" and the writer of "I Can't Stop Loving You". He and Gibson went to country music concerts at the National Guard armory, and when he heard Red Foley sing "Peace in the Valley", Howard cried. He dreamed not of becoming a cowboy or a firefighter, but of being able to sing in such a way that he could touch people the way Foley did.

At 15, Howard saw an ad in Billboard for a guitarist and singer for "a small-time traveling tent show", and he went to Greeneville, Tennessee, and asked for the job. He was offered the job because his parents, believing he would get homesick, didn't try to stop him. Howard ended up spending fourteen years on the road. He ended up performing alongside Lash LaRue and Fuzzy St. John and "hayseed comics".

== Career ==
Howard Sisk artist name Curly is a bow to American actor and comedian Curly Howard of The Three Stooges, Later, Howard performed on a national radio show, Virginia Barn Dance. At Louisiana Hayride with Faron Young and Webb Pierce, Howard met Hank Williams Sr. and Elvis Presley. Howard shook Williams' hand, and he observed how the audience loved Williams so much he received a standing ovation before he had even sung.

Howard's own career wasn't going anywhere, but he was making $50 to $60 a week, good money at the time. Later he decided to go into radio in eastern North Carolina. He eventually moved to WKBX. While he was at WKBX, Howard told his friend Roger Stockton, who worked for WSJS radio, that WSJS-FM should switch to country music. Stockton listened and WTQR became the number one station in the market.

In addition to his on-air duties, Howard served as a master of ceremonies at country music shows. Soon, his career at WKBX ended, because the 10,000-watt daytime-only station could not compete with WTQR, and the station dropped country music.

Howard moved to WCGC in Belmont for five years, then to WSVM in Valdese, then back to WCGC for three and a half years, when he was told they could not afford him. Four months after leaving WCGC, Howard was back on the air as morning host at WKMT in Kings Mountain, run by his old friend Jonas Bridges, who had worked with him in the early 1950s on a Shelby radio station. The station's format of country, bluegrass and gospel music had not changed in years.

By 1993, Howard was paired with Tobie Sawyer. In 1995, Tommy Faile, formerly of Arthur Smith and the Crackerjacks, was his partner.

Howard's last broadcast was September 28, 2001 from the Shelby Fair. At the time he was doing a "Swap Shop" program on Piedmont Super Station, selling commercial time, and doing remote broadcasts. He died October 1 at 71.

== Style ==
Howard's style was compared to that of Grady Cole of WBT (AM), because he talked "directly and personally" to his listeners. He described his voice as "cultivated ... sometimes it even sounds like it's plowed under." He would hang out at the stores he did commercials for, and he would talk to the people there just like he was one of them. On the air he would tell stories about his days as a performer, let people call in to tell what was going on in their lives, and play records. In one commercial, he talked about the 11-pound turnip he saw.
