= La Tremenda =

La Tremenda may refer to the following Spanish radio stations in Mexico and the United States:

In Mexico

- La Tremenda 106.5, an FM pirate radio station in Nuevo Laredo, Tamaulipas
- XEDD-AM, an AM radio station in Montemorelos, Nuevo León
- XERP-AM, an AM radio station in Tampico, Tamaulipas
- XESDD-AM, an AM radio station in Tijuana, Baja California
- XHCJZ-FM, an FM radio station in Ciudad Jimenez, Chihuahua
- XHCU-FM, an FM radio station in Morelos
- XHDNG-FM, an FM radio station in Durango, Durango
- XHTOM-FM, an FM radio station in Toluca, Mexico

In the United States

- KZUE, an AM station in El Reno, Oklahoma, serving Oklahoma City
- KLAT, an AM radio station in Houston, Texas
- WCEO, an AM radio station in Columbia, South Carolina
- WFAY, an AM radio station in Fayetteville, North Carolina
- WGSP/WGSP-FM, AM and FM stations in Charlotte, North Carolina
- WVOJ, an AM radio station in Jacksonville, Florida
