= WGSP =

WGSP could refer to two radio stations in the United States:

- WGSP (AM), a radio station (1310 AM) licensed to Charlotte, North Carolina
- WGSP-FM, a radio station (102.3 FM) licensed to Pageland, South Carolina
