= WAVO =

- Rock Hill, South Carolina; United States
- Broadcast area: Charlotte metropolitan area
- Frequency: 1150 kHz
- Branding: The Light FM

Programming
- Format: Contemporary Christian music (WMIT simulcast)

Ownership
- Owner: Billy Graham Evangelistic Association; (Blue Ridge Broadcasting Corporation)
- Sister stations: WMIT, WFGW, WSMX

History
- First air date: May 2, 1948 (78 years ago)
- Former call signs: WTYC (1948–1989); WXLF (1989–1990); WYRS (1990–1992)

Technical information
- Licensing authority: FCC
- Facility ID: 72330
- Class: D
- Power: 5,000 watts day 59 watts night
- Transmitter coordinates: 34°56′55.00″N 80°59′58.00″W
- Translators: 101.5 W268DM (Rock Hill) (104.3 MHz) W282BP (Charlotte, North Carolina)

Links
- Public license information: Public file; LMS
- Website: 1069thelight.org

WAVO (1150 AM) is a non-profit radio station licensed to Rock Hill, South Carolina, and serving the Charlotte metropolitan area. Programming is simulcast from 106.9 WMIT Black Mountain, North Carolina, a listener-supported ministry of the Billy Graham Evangelistic Association. WAVO and WMIT air a mix of Contemporary Christian music with some Christian talk and teaching programs, including national religious leaders Jim Daly, John MacArthur, David Jeremiah, Chuck Swindoll and Charles Stanley. WMIT's radio studios and offices are on Porters Cove Road in Asheville.

By day, WAVO is powered at 5,000 watts, using a non-directional antenna. But to avoid interfering with other stations on 1150 AM, it greatly reduces power at night to 59 watts. WAVO is also heard on FM translator 101.5 W268DM.

== History ==
On May 2, 1948, the station first signed on as WTYC. It broadcast on 1150 kilocycles with 1,000 watts as a daytimer, required to go off the air at night. The station's owners were O. Frank Thornton, W.G. Reid and W.E. Williams. Thornton sold his interest in the station after his election as South Carolina Secretary of State in January 1950. Reid sold the station to T. Lamar Simmons in 1953.

Jonas Bridges, owner of WKMT in Kings Mountain, North Carolina, was part of a group that purchased the station in 1958. He owned WTYC when it was a country music station. In April 1989, Bridges bought out his partners and formed a new ownership group which included his son Rob. The station changed its call sign to WXLF and adopted a Contemporary Christian format. Ken Mayfield, a Charlotte-area general manager known for his success with the start up of WNOW (later, he managed WRCM), was brought in. The station went by name "Life 1150." Bridges sold the station to Parkway Communications in 1990, and the call letters were changed to WYRS.

WYRS went dark in early 1992. George H. Buck Jr, the owner of Christian WHVN, bought it from Parkway Communications effective April 6, 1992. The plan was for WYRS to simulcast WHVN. The call letters were changed to WAVO in June 1992. WAVO began airing the same programming as WHVN.

For a brief time in 1997, WAVO aired the same programming as talk station WTLT.

On July 10, 2008, at 11:50 AM, WAVO ended its simulcast of WHVN to begin playing music by adult standards artists such as Frank Sinatra, Nat King Cole, Barbra Streisand, and Neil Diamond which had once been heard on WNMX, also operated by the same company as WAVO. The specialty show Big Band Jump aired each week. Until the format was cancelled in September 2008, WAVO featured programming from Jones Radio Networks.

Former logo

Starting in December 2008, WAVO's music was also heard on WEGO, allowing expansion of the station's daytime coverage area.

Morning host Ken Conrad moved from WOLS when it switched to Spanish, and he added an afternoon show. Several months later he was dropped after more than 10 years at WNMX, WOLS and WAVO/WEGO. Morning in America with Bill Bennett replaced him in the morning. WAVO and WEGO also added SRN News.

Early in 2010, WAVO/WTIX added two sports talk programs. Bryce Johnson began hosting "Sports Yapp" at 9 AM weekdays in February. On April 5, the show began airing an hour earlier. In September, the show moved to WZGV, where it joined the afternoon schedule. Also, on April 3, 2010, Chris Pardo, who moved to York County, South Carolina in 2008, began hosting "New York Sports Talk", two hours long starting at noon on both Saturday and Sunday. Pardo, the nephew of announcer Don Pardo, said that WFNZ rarely offered news about New York sports. He found that others from New York wished there was more coverage of their teams. Pardo publicized the show on web sites and by handing out information to people wearing team apparel. On October 2, 2011, this show moved to WZGV. Two years later the show moved back to WAVO. In 2014, the show moved from Sunday morning to Saturday afternoon.

On July 4, 2010, WAVO/WTIX added "Crank and Case", an automobile advice program similar to Car Talk, hosted by mechanics Chuck Sperry and Stick Case Roneis.

On March 4, 2012, after several months off the air while a new tower was built, WTIX returned to the air with separate programming.

In January 2014, "Eat, Drink and Be Merry", hosted by Joe Cutrone, began airing on Saturdays at noon.

In Summer 2014, WAVO was asking listeners for donations to keep the standards format, since advertising was hard to sell on a station targeting listeners over 55. Without $15,000 to pay for music royalties, WAVO told listeners it might return to a WHVN simulcast or try something else. By the end of August, the station met its goal.

WAVO carried newscasts at the start of each hour from Salem Radio Network.

Although WAVO had a faithful listening audience, the station was unable to garner advertisers to support the format. In October 2018, WAVO returned to a WHVN simulcast. Even so, the station continued to air "The Sounds of Sinatra" with Sid Mark on Sundays from 2-4PM and "Jazzology" with George Buck from 4-5PM. Buck owned WAVO until his death in 2013.

WHVN signed off March 31, 2020. The majority of WHVN's programming will air on WAVO. Some of the local programs from WCGC moved over to WAVO in 2019. These include "Daily Bread" and "Shining Light Baptist Church" on weekdays and "Power of Prayer", "The Bible Hour" and "Simply The Word" on weekends.

On May 4, 2020, WHVN, Inc., filed an application with the FCC to assign the license for WAVO to Blue Ridge Broadcasting Corporation, the subsidiary of the Billy Graham Ministry that is the licensee for WMIT. The transfer was completed on July 15. Blue Ridge Broadcasting also bought translators W282BP in Charlotte and W268DM in Rock Hill. On July 15, 2020, WAVO began broadcasting WMIT. The addition of WAVO significantly improved WMIT's reach in Charlotte. The main WMIT signal has long had a significant listener base in the Charlotte area, particularly the western portion, to the point of including Charlotte in its legal IDs.
