= WKTC (disambiguation) =

WKTC is a television station (Channel 63) licensed to serve Sumter, South Carolina, United States.

WKTC may also refer to:

- WGSP (AM), a radio station (1310 AM) licensed to serve Charlotte, North Carolina, United States, which held the call sign WKTC from 1958 to 1971
- WFXK, a radio station (104.3 FM) licensed to serve Bunn, North Carolina, United States, which held the call sign WKTC from 1976 to 1989
- WPLW-FM, a radio station (96.9 FM) licensed to serve Goldsboro, North Carolina, United States, which held the call sign WKTC from 1989 to 1998
