= WBZK =

WBZK may refer to:

- WBZK (FM), a radio station (94.7 FM) licensed to serve Taylor, Mississippi, United States; see List of radio stations in Mississippi
- WULR, a radio station (980 AM) licensed to serve York, South Carolina, United States, which held the call sign WBZK from 1978 to 2008
- WBT-FM, a radio station (99.3 FM) licensed to serve Chester, South Carolina, which held the call sign WBZK-FM from 1993 to 1995
