= WCSL =

WCSL may refer to:

- ICC Cricket World Cup Super League
- Women's Cricket Super League
- WCSL (AM), a radio station (1590 AM) licensed to serve Cherryville, North Carolina
