= WRJK =

WRJK may refer to:

- WRJK-LD, a low-power television station (channel 36, virtual 22) licensed to serve Arlington Heights, Illinois, United States
- WFGW, a radio station (106.7 FM) licensed to serve Black Mountain, North Carolina, United States, which held the call sign WRJK from 2005 to 2012
