= WOHS =

- Shelby, North Carolina; United States
- Frequency: 1390 kHz
- Branding: WOHS 101.5 FM 1390 AM

Programming
- Format: Oldies / Beach Music
- Affiliations: Carolina Hurricanes; Charlotte Hornets

Ownership
- Owner: KTC Broadcasting, Inc.

History
- First air date: 1958 (as WADA)
- Former call signs: WADA (1958–1984); WCCS (1984–1985); WADA (1985–2010)

Technical information
- Licensing authority: FCC
- Facility ID: 70669
- Class: D
- Power: 700 watts day 16 watts night
- Transmitter coordinates: 35°19′28.00″N 81°32′0.00″W
- Translator: 101.5 W268CU (Shelby)

Links
- Public license information: Public file; LMS
- Webcast: Listen live
- Website: WOHS Online

WOHS (1390 AM) is a commercial radio station in Shelby, North Carolina. It is owned by KTC Broadcasting and broadcasts an oldies radio format, featuring beach music.

By day, WOHS transmits with 700 watts, ut to avoid interference with other stations on 1390 AM, it reduces power at night to 16 watts. Programming is simulcast on 250-watt FM translator station W268CU on 101.5 MHz.

== History ==
Billy James of the syndicated morning radio show John Boy and Billy based in Charlotte, started his career at WADA, the previous call sign of WOHS.

The station was originally licensed in 1958 as WADA. Debbie Clary became president and general manager of WADA in 1986 and later made the decision to change from country music to talk radio. WADA was one of the first radio stations in the Charlotte area to carry Rush Limbaugh, airing the show even before 1110 WBT. Clary became a state legislator in 1995 and sold the radio station in 1999. Edwin Johnson sold the station to HRN Broadcasting in 2006.

In 2004, Tim Biggerstaff, a DJ for more than 20 years, was still hosting his show on WCSL and WLON despite diabetes-related health problems. Later he moved to Lincolnton-based Hometown Radio's Shelby operation. On WADA he played classic country music, and he hosted a "Swap Shop" show on WGNC and WOHS. By this time he had experienced a kidney transplant and two pancreas transplants. On Memorial Day 2007, while on the air, Biggerstaff had a seizure and asked for help on the air, and a listener called 911. He ended up being interviewed by BBC London, Today and People Magazine.

On January 5, 2009, WADA returned to the former WOHS studios in Shelby after having been located in Lincolnton. Calvin Hastings, president of KTC Broadcasting and the station's morning host, said, "All we want to be is a hometown radio station." Hastings said the station would air local and professional sports and that Andy Foster and David Allen would return. KTC was leasing the station but planned to buy it, which led to the move. On December 21, 2011 Inside Radio reported that KTC Broadcasting had filed to purchase WOHS from HRN Broadcasting for $225,000.

In 2010, WADA changed its call letters to WOHS. On August 8, 2016 WOHS changed its format from classic country to oldies, branded as "The Boss."
