= WTYC =

WTYC may refer to:

- WTYC-LP (FM), a low-power radio station (97.1 FM) licensed to the Taylor County Historical Society Perry, Florida, United States
- WTYC (FM), a defunct radio station (90.9 FM) formerly licensed to Marietta, Ohio, United States
- WAVO, a radio station (1150 AM) licensed to Rock Hill, South Carolina, United States, which formerly held the call sign WTYC
