= WIXE =

Coordinates: 34°57′41″N 80°32′40″W

Monroe, North Carolina; United States
- Broadcast area: Charlotte metropolitan area
- Frequency: 1190 kHz
- Branding: The Mighty 1190 and 93.1FM

Programming
- Format: Classic country/talk
- Affiliations: Compass Media Networks

Ownership
- Owner: Monroe Broadcasting

History
- First air date: May 3, 1968

Technical information
- Licensing authority: FCC
- Facility ID: 43533
- Class: D
- Power: 5,000 watts (day); 70 watts (night)
- Translator: 93.1 W226CD (Monroe)

Links
- Public license information: Public file; LMS
- Webcast: Listen live
- Website: wixe.com

WIXE (1190 AM) is a commercial radio station in Monroe, North Carolina. It is owned by Monroe Broadcasting and airs a local talk radio format along with classic country music and southern gospel on Sundays. WIXE uses local disc jockeys during the day and is automated at night, carrying the syndicated John Tesh radio show, "Intelligence for Your Life," playing Classic Country Music with Tesh's dialogue.

By day, WIXE broadcasts at 5,000 watts, using a non-directional antenna. Because 1190 AM is a clear channel frequency, WIXE greatly reduces power at night to 70 watts to avoid interference. Programming is also heard on a 180 watt FM translator station, W226CD at 93.1 MHz.

== Staff ==
WIXE Staff

- Morgan - President & Owner
- Shane Greene - Program Director
- Kathie Easton - Sales Manager
- Emily Taylor - Office Manager
- Emory Altman - Producer/On-Air
- Chris Rogers - Producer/On-Air
- Alex Helms - Sales/On-Air
- Megan Brink - Special Event Director
- “Sideline” Mike Whitmire - Football
- Hayden McAteer - Football
- Orlando Diaz - Saturday On-Air

== History ==
On May 3, 1968, the station first signed on the air. Originally WIXE was a daytimer, powered at 500 watts by day but required to go off the air at night. At first, it tried a Top 40 format.

Ray Atkins became co-owner of WIXE in 1971 after Top 40 did not work, switching to country music, the second Charlotte-area station to Top 40 after WSOC-FM. Atkins had previously played country music as a DJ on WMAP in Monroe, As a musician, he played steel guitar with Arthur Smith and Bill Hefner.

In summer 1988, for the first time in its 20 years on the air, WIXE ranked second only to WBT among AM radio stations in the Charlotte market.

On July 10, 2008, a truck accidentally backed into one of the guy wires of the station's nearly-190-foot-tall tower, bringing the tower down and knocking the station off the air. While the AM broadcast signal was off, WIXE continued streaming online.

Monroe Broadcasting owner Archie Morgan and his team began the construction of a new tower for the station. By 11 o'clock that night, the broadcast signal was back on the air thru the use of a horizontal dipole antenna. The plan was for this antenna to be used until the new tower could be built.

As of September 21, 2008, WIXE was back up to full power with the new tower, as well as a new ground system. The station already reached nine counties, and the replacement of the 40-year-old ground system made an improvement in coverage into Mecklenburg and surrounding counties.
