= WDYT =

- Kings Mountain, North Carolina; United States
- Broadcast area: Charlotte metropolitan area
- Frequency: 1220 kHz
- Branding: Radio Nueva Vida 1220

Programming
- Language: Spanish
- Format: Christian radio

Ownership
- Owner: Iglesia Nueva Vida of High Point
- Sister stations: WGOS, WULR

History
- First air date: March 12, 1953 (73 years ago)
- Former call signs: WKMT (1953–2006)
- Call sign meaning: What Do You Think (from former talk radio format)

Technical information
- Licensing authority: FCC
- Facility ID: 6817
- Class: D
- Power: 25,000 watts day 106 watts night
- Transmitter coordinates: 35°17′12.00″N 81°10′28.00″W

Links
- Public license information: Public file; LMS

WDYT (1220 AM) is a radio station licensed to Kings Mountain, North Carolina, serving the Charlotte metropolitan area. The station is currently owned by Iglesia Nueva Vida of High Point. It broadcasts a Spanish language Christian radio format.

WDYT is powered at 25,000 watts by day. Because 1220 AM is a Mexican clear channel frequency, WDYT must greatly reduce power at night to 106 watts to avoid interference. Programming was also heard on FM translator station W281BY at 104.1 MHz. W281BY’s license has been cancelled on November 23, 2024.

== History ==
On March 12, 1953, the station first signed on the air, as WKMT. It was a 1,000-watt daytimer station, required to go off the air at sunset. The call sign stood for the city of license, Kings Mountain. Jonas Bridges joined WKMT when it began, eventually becoming the owner. He never attempted to compete with large FM stations in Charlotte, focusing instead on making WKMT a good local station.

The white concrete building built in the 1920s once was home to a "beer joint" which someone actually was looking for after the station had been there 15 years.

Bridges, who once worked at WOHS in Shelby, played "Oh Lonesome Me" by Don Gibson in 1957 on WKMT. The format of country music, bluegrass and Southern Gospel stayed the same for many years.

Veteran announcer Hugh Dover of Shelby joined WKMT in 1984. Dover had spent the previous 38 years as the morning man on WOHS in Shelby, signing the station on the air in 1946. The popularity of Dover's "Carolina in the Morning Show" on WOHS carried over to his "Hugh Dover Get Together" on WKMT. Dover would describe his 1-3pm show as an "informal get together with the radio audience in which we play southern gospel music, put on information about school, civic, and church activities, as well as entertaining our sick and shut in friends." Dover continued with WKMT until his death in 1998. Ending 52 years on the airwaves of Cleveland County.

During the 1990s, Tommy Faile of Arthur Smith and the Crackerjacks was a DJ on WKMT. His sidekick was Curly Howard, who also did the morning show. Howard spent 18 years at WKBX in Winston-Salem and later worked at WCGC and WSVM. He was known for being just like his listeners, even hanging out at the store with them.

WKMT aired high school football for more than 10 years starting in the 1980s.

As of 1993, WKMT played country music, bluegrass and gospel, as it had for a long time.

Bridges sold WKMT in November 2004 to Geddings & Phillips Broadcasting, who planned to continue programming that included country and gospel music, high school football and basketball, and Kings Mountain city council meetings. Jim Arp would remain as a DJ after more than 35 years.

When Kevin and Kris Geddings switched the format of WXNC radio to talk, they announced WKMT would change to a simulcast of most of WXNC's programming. This would allow programming such as CNN News to be heard at night in some areas when WXNC was off the air. Soon after WXNC's change to talk, though, that station switched to Spanish language programming and WKMT was country again.

Three years after WBT (AM) and Danny Fontana parted ways, Danny Fontana announced he would buy WKMT. The station had received permission in May 2005 to increase its power from 1,000 to 10,000 watts during the day to better cover Charlotte, and the station also was applying for a new tower location.

In April 2006, CRN completed the purchase of WKMT from Geddings & Phillips Broadcasting. The station's signal was 1,000 watts during the day and 106 watts at night. An increase to 25,000 watts during the day was planned, with an eventual signal improvement at night.

Jon Robinson, former co-host of "Charlotte's Morning News" on WBT, and Liz Luke, previously an anchor on the WWMG morning show, co-hosted the first morning show, "Think Mornings." Robinson said the station would focus on solutions to problems rather than just talking about them. Luke said the station would do "adult humor" but that the material would be clean and make people think. She also said the station would not be Christian, but there would be a spiritual component. Charlotte radio production veteran John Moore was brought on board as producer and Senior Technical Director. CRN executive vice president Casey Shannon said the station would be an alternative to 50,000-watt WBT, targeting listeners over 25.

Fontana hosted the afternoon show and a financial advice show called "THINK Money" at noon. He was already doing an early afternoon show on WKMT from CRN studios at Fourth and College Streets in Charlotte, which was distributed by Charis Radio Network and was being aired on iLifeTV on cable.

The power increase was approved in March 2007. At that time the station announced plans to affiliate with ABC Radio and to add comedian Dennis Miller in the late morning. Also, Bill O'Reilly would replace Fontana's early afternoon show. TV advertising soon followed, even though the station's signal increase was not expected to be complete until July. First, the station increased to 6250 watts during the day. WDYT began broadcasting at 25,000 watts during the day in September. Also in September, Luke found out she would no longer be a host of the morning show.

On July 18, 2008, general manager Deanna Greco said the morning show was being dropped temporarily for a syndicated show until advertising revenues improved. Robinson had been off the air since May 2008 due to treatment for squamous cell carcinoma, but he hoped to return.

On August 4, 2008, the new morning lineup debuted with a move of the Danny Fontana Show from afternoons to mornings to create THINK Mornings with Danny Fontana. Molly Carroll was retained from the former morning show and has joined Bo Thompson to create "AM 1220 with Molly and Bo" from 9 to 10 a.m. There were other changes in the programming lineup as well, extending many current national syndicated shows to their full live time slot.

Despite adding such hosts as Bill O'Reilly and Sean Hannity, WDYT ranked no. 21 in the ratings, and on January 26, the station told the FCC it would stop broadcasting. CRN would continue to hold the license for 30 days, and its agreement with the FCC could be extended later for a year. Fontana blamed the poor economy, which caused advertising to decline, and said the station might return with a new format, or it could even be sold.

The station signed back on (in testing mode) with a Spanish format in August 2009. In November 2009, it was reported that High Point, North Carolina–based Iglesia Nueva Vida, a religious broadcaster, was buying WDYT for $425,000 with plans for a Spanish format.

In December 2020, WDYT began simulcasting the Mainstream Urban format heard on WGIV and its translators, branded as "Streetz 103.3 & 100.5".

In 2023, it returned to its previous Spanish language Christian radio programming.
