= Charles Hicks (disambiguation) =

Charles Hicks (?–1902) was an African American advance man, manager, performer, and owner of blackface minstrel troupes composed of African American performers.

Charles Hicks may also refer to:

- Charles Hicks (runner) (born 2001), British–American athlete
- Charlie Hicks (1939–2015), American broadcaster
- Charley Lincoln (1900–1963), a.k.a. Charlie Hicks
- Charles P. Hicks (1858–1929), American politician from Arizona
- Charles R. Hicks (1767–1827), second principal chief of the Cherokee Nation
- Chuck Hicks (1927–2001), American actor and stuntman
