= WNOW =

WNOW may refer to:

- WNOW (AM), a radio station (1030 AM) licensed to serve Mint Hill, North Carolina, United States
- WYHX, a radio station (96.3 FM) licensed to serve Indianapolis, Indiana, United States, which held the call sign WNOW-FM in 2022
- WHHH, a radio station (100.9 FM) licensed to serve Speedway, Indiana, which held the call sign WNOW-FM from 2014 to 2022
- WINS-FM, a radio station (92.3 FM) licensed to serve New York, New York, United States, which held the callsign WNOW-FM from 2012 to 2014
- WOSF, a radio station (105.3 FM) licensed to serve Gaffney, South Carolina, United States, which held the callsign WNOW-FM from 2007 to 2012
