= WGNC =

WGNC may refer to:

- WGNC (AM), a radio station (1450 AM) licensed to serve Gastonia, North Carolina, United States
- WGNC-FM, a radio station (88.5 FM) licensed to serve Constantine, Michigan, United States
- WBAV-FM, a radio station (101.9 FM) licensed to serve Gastonia, North Carolina, United States which held the call sign WGNC-FM from 1948 to 1978
