= WKMT =

WKMT may refer to:

- WKMT (FM), a radio station (89.5 FM) licensed to serve Fulton, Kentucky, United States
- WDYT, a radio station (1220 AM) licensed to serve Kings Mountain, North Carolina, United States, which held the call sign WKMT until 2006
