= WGOS =

Coordinates: 35°54′58″N 80°01′00″W

- High Point, North Carolina; United States
- Broadcast area: Piedmont Triad
- Frequency: 1070 kHz
- Branding: 1070 AM High Point

Programming
- Language: Spanish
- Format: Christian radio

Ownership
- Owner: Iglesia Nueva Vida
- Sister stations: WDYT, WULR

History
- First air date: June 3, 1947; 79 years ago
- Call sign meaning: "Golden Oldies" (former format)

Technical information
- Licensing authority: FCC
- Facility ID: 56508
- Class: D
- Power: 1,000 watts (day)
- Translator: 97.5 W248CW (High Point)

Links
- Public license information: Public file; LMS
- Website: cadenaradialnuevavida.com/site/wgos-1070-am/

WGOS (1070 AM) is an American radio station broadcasting a Spanish Christian radio format. Licensed to High Point, North Carolina, it serves the Piedmont Triad area. The station is owned by Iglesia Nueva Vida, a national religious broadcaster.

WGOS is a daytimer station. By day, it is powered at 1,000 watts, using a non-directional antenna. But because 1070 AM is a clear channel frequency reserved for Class A KNX in Los Angeles, WGOS must sign off at night to avoid interference. Programming is heard around the clock on 100 watt FM translator W248CW at 97.5 MHz in High Point.

== History ==
WHPE 1070 AM began broadcasting June 3, 1947. It and 95.5 FM were originally owned by the High Point Enterprise daily newspaper. The station was religious in the 1960s and then played Top 40.

In 1974, the FM station was purchased by the Bible Broadcasting Network, based in Charlotte, North Carolina, as the network's second station. The AM station switched its call sign to WGOS under local ownership, while the FM station continues using the call letters WHPE-FM.

In 1990, WGOS was playing "golden oldies". From 1992 until 1995, WGOS was a talk radio station. By 1997, the station was airing a mix of gospel music, country music and Spanish language programming.

On February 3, 2003, veteran radio host Dusty Dunn made his debut on WGOS, more than a year after leaving WWBG when it made a format change to Spanish programming. As he did on WWBG, he talked about politics and issues, interviewed local leaders, and took phone calls from listeners. In order to convince station management to hire him, Dunn sold his own advertising. Also in 2003, WGOS moved its studio to Greensboro. Starting in 2006, the show focused primarily on sports, with Jim Modlin as co-host. On May 30, 2008, Dunn retired after 44 years in Greensboro area radio.

Ritchy Broadcasting owned the station prior to its sale to High Point-based religious broadcaster Iglesia Nueva Vida.
