= Robert D. Raiford =

American actor and broadcaster (1927–2017)

- Born: 27 December 1927
- Died: 17 November 2017 (aged 89)
- Education: University of South Carolina
- Presenting career
- Show: The John Boy and Billy Big Show
- Country: United States

Robert D. Raiford (December 27, 1927 – November 17, 2017) was an American radio broadcaster and actor, best known for his political/social commentaries delivered during The John Boy and Billy Big Show, a morning radio program heard on stations throughout the American South. He was from Concord, North Carolina, and majored in communication at the University of South Carolina. Raiford got his start in broadcasting in 1944 by calling play by play at baseball games. His first real radio job was at WEGO (AM) in Concord, North Carolina. Raiford has appeared in 28 movies, often portraying judge characters. He frequently closed his commentaries with the line "Who says that? I say that!", which also served as the title of a book containing excerpts from these segments. Early in his career, Raiford worked for WTOP radio and WTOP-TV, both CBS News affiliates in Washington, D.C. His best-known work was a live radio broadcast on WTOP, a CBS Radio affiliate, covering the state funeral of President John F. Kennedy. He also worked at Charlotte radio station WBT, and hosted a show on WIST, which aired Charlotte's first telephone talk radio format. Raiford later taught Communications at the University of North Carolina at Charlotte. From 1978 to 1986, Raiford was a news anchor and talk show host for Charlotte's NBC television affiliate, known as WRET-TV and later WPCQ-TV during his tenure there (it is now WCNC-TV).

On the June 9, 2016, episode of The John Boy and Billy Big Show, John Isley ("John Boy") announced that Raiford had retired from the show, due to suffering a stroke the previous August that greatly affected his speech and mobility. Raiford had not delivered any commentaries during the intervening months, choosing to focus on his recovery instead.

Raiford died on November 17, 2017, at age 89.

== Filmography ==
Year	Title	Role	Notes
1990	The Handmaid's Tale	Dick	
1991	Billy Bathgate	Judge	
1992	In the Line of Duty: Street War	Judge	TV movie
1993	Super Mario Bros.	TV Announcer	
1993	The Program	Chancellor Wilson	
1993-1995	Matlock	Judge Michael Stern / Warden / Mr. McEvoy	5 episodes
1994	Radioland Murders	Ben Butter	
1994	A Burning Passion: The Margaret Mitchell Story	Harlee Branch	TV movie
1994	Bionic Ever After?	Minister	TV movie
1995	Death in Small Doses	Dr. Butler	TV movie
1997	Paradise Falls	Rich Man on Train	
1999	The Rage: Carrie 2	Senior D.A.	
2005	A Tale About Bootlegging	Judge Bob Landis	(final film role)
