= WSMX (AM) =

- Winston-Salem, North Carolina; United States
- Broadcast area: Metro Winston-Salem
- Frequency: 1500 kHz
- Branding: The Light FM

Programming
- Format: Contemporary Christian

Ownership
- Owner: Blue Ridge Broadcasting Corporation
- Sister stations: WMIT, WFGW

History
- First air date: October 1964

Technical information
- Licensing authority: FCC
- Facility ID: 24682
- Class: D
- Power: 140 watts (days only)
- Transmitter coordinates: 36°04′26″N 80°15′19″W
- Translator: 94.9 W235CY (Winston-Salem)

Links
- Public license information: Public file; LMS
- Webcast: Listen live
- Website: thelightfm.org

WSMX (1500 AM) is a radio station licensed to Winston-Salem, North Carolina, United States. WSMX is owned by Blue Ridge Broadcasting Corporation.

== History ==
From its October 1964 sign-on until 1976, this was a Country-Western station with the letters WKBX and a 10,000-watt directional signal shaped like a football. Stuart Epperson sold the station early in 1976 to Randolph Properties Inc. of Dallas, Texas, though general manager Curly Howard said no changes were planned. In July 1976, it became WURL ("World"), the first all-news radio station in the area. On November 3, 1976, Crash Williams said the news format would remain even after the demise of the NBC news service in mid-1977. Later, the station began airing Christian programming, primarily for an African-American audience. The first general manager of the station when the format became African American, with a Contemporary Gospel music and talk format, was Jay Francis Springs, in 1982, when the station was sold to Gospel Media. Other staff members were Leonard "Tippy" Calloway, Al Martin, Nancy Caree, Paul Johnson, Henry "Leon" Harper and Bea Swisher.

Early in 2014, WSMX had a Spanish language format as "Radio La Movidita".

Local businessman Jerry Holt was leasing WTOB in 2014 but lost the station and took over WSMX, which he had planned to switch to sports talk. In June 2014, both stations made changes. The oldies and beach music on WTOB was moved to WSMX along with some DJs from WTOB. Holt said WSMX would play rock, country, R&B and other music from 1956 to 1978, describing at as "the music you grew up with", though younger people enjoyed the music too. Among those too young to remember the music when it was new was Aaron Gabriel, a DJ who moved to WSMX after a month on WTOB and hosted "Midday Mojo" with soul, funk, blues and Motown. Dickie Dean's "Afternoon Delight" would follow Gabriel's. WSMX would also air On the Beach with Charlie Brown.

Holt lost the lease on WSMX, and in May 2015, the station was leased by Daniel Williard. IE “Dancin Dan Curtis”. Williard, who is also the lessee of WTOB, moved WSMX into the WTOB building at 3720 Reynolda Rd, and changed the format to 100% Carolina Beach and Shag. Mike Harding, a member of the Association of Beach and Shag Club DeeJays, was named Program Director. Williard leased WTOB and WSMX until early 2016.

In November 2015, the classic hits format from WTOB moved to WSMX temporarily, while the oldies and beach format moved online. The WTOB format moved to WEGO December 18.

Nancy A. Epperson and Stuart W. Epperson, Jr. later owned the station. The station returned to Spanish Christian programming until May 2017. Then parent company Truth Broadcasting simulcasted with parent station WTRU for a short stint; then on June 1, WSMX started simulcasting sister station WSTS which plays Southern Gospel music.

Blue Ridge Broadcasting, owner of WMIT in Black Mountain, North Carolina, now owns the station. A translator W235CY broadcasts at 94.9 FM.
