= WCGC =

Belmont, North Carolina; United States
- Broadcast area: Charlotte metropolitan area
- Frequency: 1270 kHz

Programming
- Format: Catholic radio
- Affiliations: EWTN Radio

Ownership
- Owner: Carolina Catholic Radio Network

History
- First air date: December 11, 1954

Technical information
- Licensing authority: FCC
- Facility ID: 27218
- Class: B
- Power: 10,000 watts (day); 500 watts (night)
- Transmitter coordinates: 35°15′05″N 81°03′26″W

Links
- Public license information: Public file; LMS
- Webcast: Listen live
- Website: carolinacatholicmedia.org

WCGC (1270 AM) is a noncommercial radio station licensed to Belmont, North Carolina, United States, and serving the Charlotte and Gastonia areas. The station is owned by Carolina Catholic Radio Network and broadcasts a Catholic radio format, using programming from the EWTN Radio Network.

WCGC's transmitter is located on the western end of Belmont.

== History ==
=== Early years ===
WCGC was started by Robert Richard Hilker, signing on the air on December 11, 1954. The 5,000-watt radio station was put on the air with a transmitter Hilker built from a Heathkit model. He applied to the Federal Communications Commission for a radio station construction permit. Hilker also built the Suburban Radio Group which owned and operated 11 AM and FM radio stations and also put on two television stations, WJZY-TV in Charlotte and another in Morehead City.

At the time of Hilker's death, the radio station was still using the transmitter he built as a backup for the now computerized WCGC main system. Born in Winston-Salem, he served in the U.S. Navy and established Cablevision Companies in Gaston County and the Lake Norman area as well at Charlotte television station WJZY-TV. He was past Chairman of the National Association of Broadcasters Radio Board, served on the boards of numerous national broadcasting associations and civic organizations and was inducted into the N.C. Broadcasters Hall of Fame.

=== WCGC personalities ===
Ebb Gantt had played football for Belmont High School and Belmont Abbey College. He later became the radio voice for both teams as well as Davidson College. (The high school later consolidated with Cramerton High to form South Point High School.) Gantt served as a WCGC sportscaster, beginning in the late 1950s. Gantt later became the station's general manager and retired in 1980.

Screenwriter and filmmaker Richard O'Sullivan worked as an on-air personality at WCGC in the late eighties.

Jack LaFaivre, who went on to jobs at WXII and WSJS in Winston-Salem, North Carolina, worked at WCGC after graduating from Belmont Abbey.

Other local broadcasters spent time at WCGC including Joe McLaney, who went on to WBT 1110 as Production Director, and Bob Brandon, formerly of WSOC-FM and Clear Channel Charlotte.

=== Baseball ===
In 1986, the Atlanta Braves of Major League Baseball were dropped by WSOC 930 AM. To bring professional baseball games back to the Charlotte market, WCGC picked up the Baltimore Orioles. WJZY-TV, a TV station which shared a building with WCGC in its early days, also aired the Orioles.

WCGC also broadcast all games of the minor league baseball Gastonia Rangers. Some of the games were to be tape-delayed if they conflicted with South Point High School football, but WCGC agreed to carry the baseball games live if the team made the playoffs. WGNC in Gastonia took over the broadcasts in 1990

In 1993, WCGC decided to carry Cleveland Indians games.

Rev. Charles Beasley had a Sunday morning show on WCGC until general manager Jim Mintzer found out he was grand dragon of the Christian Knights of the Ku Klux Klan. Protestors from four states showed up at city hall and the radio station. They protested without incident, though law enforcement officers stood by just in case anything happened.

WCGC had been on the air 35 years in June 1989 when Suburban Radio Group, owner of 11 radio stations, sold its flagship station in Belmont to Mintzer. The radio group remained in the building with WCGC, and no major format changes were planned. WCGC played country music except on Sundays, when the station aired religious programming.

=== Change to Talk ===
In January 1994, WCGC made the switch to talk radio, with shows such as G. Gordon Liddy, Larry King and Pat Buchanan. Locally, Chris Vaughn began a 30-minute talk show with a conservative focus, which expanded to 90 minutes in June. Another local host was John Sullivan, who moved to WNMX 1480 AM (now WGFY) in 1996.

In August 1995, newspaper parenting columnist John Rosemond began a talk show on WSIC in Statesville, which WCGC also aired.

In 1996, WCGC carried West Mecklenburg High School Friday night football games on Saturday mornings.

In 1997, WCGC became the Charlotte-area affiliate for the National Hockey League Carolina Hurricanes Radio Network. It was the team's first season playing in North Carolina.

In July 1998, Mintzer sold WCGC to the owners of WHVN 1240 AM. However, WCGC continued to make news for an incident on the "Wakin' Up with Java John" morning show. John Wall, a Gastonia city employee, sued talk show host John Hunsucker and Mintzer. He claimed derogatory comments were made by an anonymous caller known as "Slim Jim" during a five-month period while Mintzer owned the station. Mintzer said WCGC broadcast disclaimers telling listeners that callers' opinions were not those of the station. A jury awarded $10,500 to Wall, leading Penn State journalism professor Robert Richards, also director of the Pennsylvania Center for the First Amendment, to regard this case as yet another potential limit on freedom of speech.

WCGC began simulcasting WHVN's programming most of the time but continued to carry separate sports programs, as well as Metropolitan Opera radio broadcasts.

=== Catholic programming ===
On February 1, 2019, The Carolina Catholic Radio Network entered into a Local Marketing Agreement (LMA) with GHB Broadcasting to operate WCGC. The majority of the programming would come from the national Catholic network, EWTN. The building on Wilkinson Boulevard was sold in November 2018 and the station moved to Belmont Abbey College. Despite the changes, WCGC continued to air South Point football games as well as football games from Appalachian State University.

In 2020, WCGC was off the air for a short time when Carolina Catholic Radio Network filed to purchase the station for $210,000 from GHB.
