= WLON =

- Lincolnton, North Carolina; United States
- Frequency: 1050 kHz
- Branding: 107.5 FM 1050 AM WLON

Programming
- Format: Oldies
- Affiliations: North Carolina News Network

Ownership
- Owner: Lanny Ford; (Sports Talk Guys, LLC)

History
- First air date: 1953

Technical information
- Licensing authority: FCC
- Facility ID: 62366
- Class: D
- Power: 1,000 watts day 231 watts night
- Transmitter coordinates: 35°29′28.00″N 81°16′3.00″W
- Translator: 107.5 W298CK (Lincolnton)

Links
- Public license information: Public file; LMS
- Webcast: Listen live
- Website: 1050wlon.com

WLON (1050 AM) is a radio station broadcasting an oldies format and serving the Lincolnton, North Carolina area, and is owned and operated by Lanny Ford, through licensee Sports Talk Guys, LLC. WLON is also the home of Lincoln County football every Friday night, Atlanta Braves baseball, Clemson and Duke and UNC Tar Heels college basketball and football. WLON also carries Charlotte Hornets basketball, Carolina Panthers football, the ACC and NCAA basketball tournaments.

== History ==
Frank Hall of Lake Wylie, Tommy Hunter of Belmont and Jeff and Vivian Nichols of Lincolnton owned the 34-year-old WLON, the only radio station in Lincoln County. Jeff Nichols was general manager. The format was adult contemporary/oldies. Larry Seagle had been news director for 18 years. Tim Biggerstaff had been a DJ for about 10 years.

On April 1, 1993, Cherryville-based KTC Broadcasting Inc. took over WLON in a lease agreement. KTC was buying the station but would operate it under a lease agreement until the Federal Communications Commission approved the sale. WLON would join The Piedmont Superstations Radio Network of WCSL in Cherryville, WGNC in Gastonia and WOHS (730 AM) in Shelby, which simulcast most of their programming. The change would mean 24-hour broadcasts on WLON for the first time. Tim Biggerstaff would remain as morning DJ, and his show would be heard on all four KTC stations. News for the entire area would be expanded. The four stations aired UNC football and basketball, Atlanta Braves baseball, Dallas Cowboys and Washington Redskins NFL football, and CBS coverage of such events as The World Series and The Super Bowl.

The four stations added the NFL Carolina Panthers when the team began playing in 1995. They also aired games of the NBA Charlotte Hornets.

Previous logo

Late in 1999, the four stations changed from country music to "super oldies." Biggerstaff, the program director, said country had moved away from its traditional sound. Lillie White remained as midday host, and Andy Foster was afternoon host. Local and sports remained important, and the stations aired the One-on-One sports radio network at night.

In 2004, Biggerstaff was still hosting his show on WCSL and WLON despite diabetes-related health problems. Later, he moved to Lincolnton-based Hometown Radio's Shelby operation. On WADA, he played classic country music and hosted a "Swap Shop" show on WGNC and WOHS. By this time, he had experienced a kidney transplant and two pancreas transplants.

WLON played a mixture of 1960s, 1970s and some 1980s oldies music, as well as Christian contemporary and beach music on Sundays.

WLON now plays Beach and Oldies along with the sports.

Effective December 1, 2014, Calvin Hastings repurchased WLON and WCSL from HRN Broadcasting for $240,000, through his licensee KTC Broadcasting, Inc.

On August 8, 2016, WLON changed their format to oldies, branded as "The Boss".

Effective May 16, 2022, KTC Broadcasting sold WLON and translator W298CK to Lanny Ford's Sports Talk Guys, LLC for $275,000.
