= Jon Robinson (announcer) =

American announcer (born 1960)

Jon Robinson (born 1960) is a former longtime radio and television personality in Charlotte, North Carolina. He was also the public address announcer for the NFL's Carolina Panthers from the team's inception in 1995 until midway through the 2009 season. He also called the first seven editions of the Meineke Car Care Bowl (known as the Continental Tire Bowl from 2002 to 2004).

A native of nearby Gastonia, Robinson graduated from the University of Maryland in 1983 and worked at several Charlotte radio stations before landing the morning drive-time slot at WBT in 1992. In 1997, he moved to then-sister television station WBTV as a reporter and fill-in anchor. In 2004, after being passed over for a promotion, he moved to WCBD-TV in Charleston, South Carolina as the main evening anchor. He commuted to Charlotte for the next two years for Panthers games.

In 2006, he moved back to Charlotte as morning host at WDYT, a station in nearby Kings Mountain that had recently boosted its daytime power to cover Charlotte. Almost two years into this job, he was diagnosed with squamous cell carcinoma in his throat. Doctors managed to catch it before it spread, however. Having been laid off from WDYT, he then moved to WKQC as morning host in December 2008. This slot, and his tenure as Panthers PA announcer, ended abruptly in October 2009 when he was arrested for telephoning and texting his estranged second wife in violation of a restraining order.

In December 2009, Robinson told The Charlotte Observer that he'd been abusing drugs almost continuously since he was 12, primarily heroin and cocaine. While he tried to quit twice during his tenure at WBT, he had resumed "hot and heavy" abuse since 1998 despite several failed attempts at rehab. He said that his habit got so severe that while he worked in Charleston, he was often high on the air. He lost his job at WCBD soon after getting into a cocaine-fueled street fight, and his second wife left him after a relapse led to a fight at home. His second wife believed his spiral into drug abuse was due to being molested for five years by a man who coached him in basketball.

== External links/references ==
Washburn, Mark (December 20, 2009). "Former media star reveals dark life". The State. The Charlotte Observer.
