= WHVN =

Spanish-language radio station in Charlotte, North Carolina

- Charlotte, North Carolina; United States
- Broadcast area: Charlotte metropolitan area
- Frequency: 1240 kHz
- Branding: La Verdad Charlotte

Programming
- Language: Spanish
- Format: Religious
- Affiliations: Charlotte Independence

Ownership
- Owner: Stuart Epperson; (Truth Broadcasting Corporation)

History
- First air date: December 5, 1928
- Former call signs: WRBU (1929–1930); WSOC (1930–1960); WIST (1960–1983)
- Former frequencies: 1210 kHz (1929–1941)
- Call sign meaning: "Heaven"

Technical information
- Licensing authority: FCC
- Facility ID: 72331
- Class: C
- Power: 1,000 watts
- Transmitter coordinates: 35°15′50.6″N 80°46′12.7″W

Links
- Public license information: Public file; LMS

WHVN (1240 AM; "La Verdad Charlotte") is a Spanish language religious radio station licensed to Charlotte, North Carolina, United States. The station is owned by Stuart Epperson's Truth Broadcasting Corporation. WHVN is licensed by the U.S. Federal Communications Commission (FCC) for digital HD Radio operation, although the station is not currently broadcasting in HD.

== History ==
=== Early years ===
The station that would become WHVN on the 1240 frequency in Charlotte began operations in December 5, 1928 in Gastonia, North Carolina, on 1210 kHz, with the sequentially assigned call letters WRBU. Test broadcasts began on December 4. The station had a power of 100 watts and was licensed to the "A. J. Kirby Music Company". On November 29, 1930, the call sign was changed to WSOC, supposedly meaning "We Serve Our City"; three years later, the station moved from Gastonia to Charlotte. The 1941 North American Regional Broadcasting Agreement (NARBA), mandated a change in frequency to 1240 kHz. In the late 1950s, most stations on "Class IV" (local) frequencies were allowed to increase their daytime power to 1,000 watts, and WSOC increased their daytime power as well. Also in the 1950s the owners of WSOC brought to the air WSOC-FM at 103.7 MHz, and WSOC-TV on VHF channel 9.

=== Top 40 era ===
On September 2, 1960, Cox Broadcasting Company, then-owners of WSOC, traded frequencies with WIST at 930 kHz. Under the ownership of Cosmos Broadcasting and later Henderson Belk the station gained the WIST legacy of the first true Top 40 station in Charlotte, described by The Charlotte Observer in 1965 as "primarily rock 'n' roll". By the end of the decade, they had pioneered the progressive rock format in Charlotte as "The Amazing AM", but changes were in the works. In 1972, the progressive rock format was shifted to WIST-FM at 95.1 MHz, and their calls were changed to WRNA. After WRNA dropped the progressive format, in May 1973, J.J. Austin began hosting "AM Alternative" in the evening. Belk then sold WIST to Statesville Broadcasting Company, which gained CBS Radio Network affiliation for the station and began Charlotte's first talk radio format. Charlotte radio legend Jack Knight was one of the hosts. General manager Garrett Allen called the format "a venture into the unknown" and a "radical departure" that he believed no other station in the Southeastern united States was doing. Future John Boy and Billy sidekick Robert D. Raiford hosted one of the talk shows, the "no-holds-barred" program "Rebel without a Pause", which aired first from 10 a.m. to noon for two weeks and then from 6:30 to 10 a.m. each morning starting August 13, 1973. Raiford described Allen as ""just to the right of Genghis Khan." Raiford was notorious for screaming at callers. The format was unsuccessful, and Statesville Broadcasting sold the station by the middle of the 1970s.

As of 1975, WIST was one of only two area stations offering classical music with six hours on Sunday afternoon.

=== Adult contemporary turned country era ===
WIST's next ownership was a partnership between former WBT ad salesman Al Munn and Consolidated Theater Corporation. Munn initially changed the format to adult contemporary music and brought his family into the employ of the station. Munn also attempted to operate the station as a broadcasting school, eventually separating the school functions into the "WISTA School of Broadcasting". In 1979 the Charlotte radio landscape had a major change. Longtime AM country music leader WAME was purchased by Jimmy Swaggart Ministries and became a religious station. The country music format hole was quickly filled by WIST, becoming "Live Country 1240". By this time the partnership between Munn and Consolidated Theaters was coming unraveled, and the theater company bought Munn out of the arrangement.

In the early 1980s, WIST gave country music its last serious attempt on the AM dial in Charlotte, becoming "The Bright Spot". The format was innovative, but most country listeners had switched to WSOC-FM and the format did not succeed. As its last gasp, WIST tried Top 40 again in the early 1980s before signing off the air.

=== Switch to religious format ===
In 1983, the station was purchased by George H. Buck, who at that time owned WHVN, which operated daytime-only at 1310 kHz. Originally, 1310 had been WKTC, Charlotte's first country station, before adopting a Christian format in 1971. WHVN moved to the 1240 frequency, and sold its old frequency to Dick Tomlinson. Tomlinson began WGSP on 1310, which exists today as a regional Mexican format.

For most of the years between 1996 and 2008, WAVO in Rock Hill, South Carolina, simulcast WHVN. The simulcast resumed from 2018 to 2020.

In 1998, WHVN's owner bought WCGC in Belmont.

In 2009, WHVN Inc. bought an existing permit for a translator at 93.5 FM. As of August 2009, the radio station used another translator at 104.3 FM.

=== Later years and shutdown ===
In 2014, WTIX in Concord, North Carolina (later WEGO), began simulcasting WHVN. This ended with the WTIX sale in 2015.

On February 1, 2019, The Carolina Catholic Radio Network entered into an LMA with GHB Broadcasting to operate WCGC. The majority of the programming would come from EWTN. Carolina Catholic Radio Network bought the station in 2020, leaving GHB with three stations, WHVN, WAVO and WOLS.

On March 30, 2020, It was announced that WHVN would go off the air the next day. After the owner's death in 2013, a trustee was told to continue the businesses but eventually sell them in order to care for his widow. The station's farewell program was a call-in show where listeners talk about their memories. When that program ended, after a final sign-off, WHVN's transmitter was scheduled to shut down for the final time at 5:00 p.m., bringing a close to the 91-year history of the station. The 8 acres where the transmitter was located have been rezoned for developing medical offices. WAVO continued to air the majority of the programs aired on WHVN. Blue Ridge Broadcasting bought WAVO along with translators W282BP in Charlotte and W268DM in Rock Hill.

=== Rebirth and sale ===
On November 2, 2020, WHVN returned to the air using a long wire antenna attached to the STL tower behind the studios on North Tryon Street. The station adopted the adult standards format which formerly aired on sister station WAVO.

GHB Radio Inc. bought WHVN for $20,000 in 2020, and in March 2021, announced the station's sale to Stuart Epperson's Truth Broadcasting Corporation for $55,000. The sale was consummated on June 25, 2021.

In September 2021, WHVN changed to a Spanish language format.
