= WPYR =

Coordinates: 30°27′39″N 91°13′23″W

- Baton Rouge, Louisiana; United States
- Broadcast area: Baton Rouge metropolitan area
- Frequency: 1380 kHz

Programming
- Format: Catholic

Ownership
- Owner: Catholic Community Radio, Inc.; (Catholic Community Radio, Inc.)

History
- First air date: 1956; 70 years ago
- Former call signs: WYNK (1956–2005)
- Call sign meaning: Originally progressive talk; since backronymed to represent "We're Preparing Your Reign, Jesus"; or "Pray Your Rosary"; or "Prayer"

Technical information
- Licensing authority: FCC
- Facility ID: 47403
- Class: D
- Power: 5,000 watts (day); 62 watts (night)
- Translator: (105.1 MHz) K286CS (Baton Rouge)

Links
- Public license information: Public file; LMS
- Webcast: Listen Live
- Website: Station info

WPYR (1380 AM) is an American radio station licensed to serve the community of Baton Rouge, Louisiana. The station currently airs a Catholic programming format.

== History ==
WPYR was originally WYNK, a country music outlet until its format was moved to the FM side. The station signed on in 1956 and was affiliated with ABC Radio and Mutual. In March 1998, WYNK switched to Radio Disney and briefly held the WFMF callsign after the FM side became WLSS. Once WLSS returned to the WFMF callsign, 1380 reverted to WYNK. WYNK flipped to a syndicated talk format on April 22, 2002.

In 2005, WYNK became the Baton Rouge affiliate of Air America Radio and changed call sign to WPYR.

In late 2007, the station switched to Clear Channel's Hallelujah Contemporary Gospel music format.

In 2008, WPYR was sold to Michael Glitner, who then exchanged WPYR for station WBZK in York, South Carolina (now WULR), which was owned by Pamal Broadcasting and is near Glitner's new home in South Carolina.

Following the station swap, WPYR returned with a new Spanish format. The station was broadcasting a simulcast of WFNO's "La Fabulosa 830".

In August 2009, Catholic Community Radio, Inc. signed a purchase agreement with the Davidson Media Group intending to buy the station and switch to a Catholic format for the Baton Rouge area.

On December 11, 2009, Catholic Community Radio, Inc. completed the sale of WPYR with Davidson Media Group. The station is a lay apostolate owned and operated by Catholic Community Radio, Inc. within the Catholic Diocese of Baton Rouge.

The station currently hosts 24-hour Catholic Talk format, begun in the 1st Quarter of 2010 drawing from local and national sources such as EWTN Global Radio Network, Ave Maria Radio, and Relevant Radio.

WPYR began broadcasting a one-hour live morning program beginning at 7:00am called "Wake Up Baton Rouge! Live." When the live show began broadcasting in the New Orleans area via WQNO, the show's name changed to "Wake Up Louisiana."
