= Bob Rathbun =

American broadcaster

- Born: Robert Courtland Rathbun; November 25, 1954 (age 71); Wakefield, Rhode Island, U.S.
- Occupations: Television broadcaster, Atlanta Hawks

Robert Courtland Rathbun (born November 25, 1954) is an American sportscaster, motivational speaker, and author. He has been the television play-by-play announcer for Atlanta Hawks and Atlanta Dream basketball games on FanDuel Sports Network South since 1996.

== Biography ==
Rathbun is a 1976 graduate of Catawba College in Salisbury, North Carolina and began his career as a sports director for WSTP Radio in Salisbury, North Carolina, in 1973.

Rathbun served as the lead broadcaster for ESPN covering ArenaBowl '87, the inaugural championship game of the Arena Football League, alongside Lee Corso in 1987. He has also done broadcast work for both the Washington Bullets and Baltimore Orioles. His baseball experience includes play-by-play gigs with Tidewater Tides, and the Richmond Braves.

From 1992 to 1994, Rathbun worked as a radio broadcaster for the Detroit Tigers. Rathbun and Rick Rizzs replaced legendary Tigers' voice Ernie Harwell and his partner Paul Carey after they were fired by the team’s then flagship station WJR. Harwell's firing was extremely unpopular with Detroit fans, and Rizzs and Rathbun — along with then-team president Bo Schembechler — bore the brunt of the fans' anger.

After owner Mike Ilitch took over the team in 1993, Harwell returned to the booth to call games with Rizzs and Rathbun. The tandem of Rizzs and Rathbun were fired at the end of the strike-shortened 1994 season

Rathbun served as the play-by-play announcer on Atlanta Braves baseball games on Fox Sports Net (formerly SportsSouth) from 1997 to 2006.

He is currently the play-by-play announcer for the NBA's Atlanta Hawks, and the WNBA Atlanta Dream. He is currently partnered with Dominique Wilkins, a nine-time NBA All-Star and player for the Hawks. In addition, Rathbun also serves as the play-by-play announcer for Southeastern Conference football games on FSN South and Atlantic Coast Conference college basketball and football games for Raycom Sports.

Prior to the Hawks' December 5, 2022 game against the Oklahoma City Thunder, Rathbun had a medical emergency live on-air. Hawks' sideline reporter Lauren Jbara filled in for him in the game. Mike Morgan and Mike Conti subsequently filled in for Rathbun for the next few Hawks games before he returned on December 19.

== Recognition ==
Rathbun was inducted in the Catawba College Sports Hall of Fame in 2006, and a recipient of the Distinguished Alumni Award in 1988.

After being named Virginia Sportscaster of the Year six separate times, he was awarded the same honor in Georgia in 1998. In 2008, he was named to the Virginia Sports Hall of Fame.

In 2025, he was also inducted into the Georgia Sports Hall of Fame.
