= WNOW (AM) =

- Mint Hill, North Carolina; United States
- Broadcast area: Charlotte metropolitan area
- Frequency: 1030 kHz
- Branding: Leyendas 99.1 y 97.3 FM

Programming
- Format: Classic regional Mexican

Ownership
- Owner: Norsan Media; (Norsan Media LLC)
- Sister stations: WGSP, WGSP-FM, WXNC, WOLS

History
- First air date: August 1, 1987
- Former call signs: WCQR (1985–1986)
- Call sign meaning: Naomi O. Williams, wife of the original owner

Technical information
- Licensing authority: FCC
- Facility ID: 10646
- Class: D
- Power: 9,400 watts (days only)
- Transmitter coordinates: 35°8′26″N 80°36′1″W
- Translator: (99.1 MHz) W256BP (Charlotte)
- Repeater: 1060 WXNC (Monroe)

Links
- Public license information: Public file; LMS
- Website: leyendasclt.com

WNOW (1030 AM, "Leyendas") is an commercial radio station licensed to Mint Hill, North Carolina, United States, that operates during the daytime hours only. Owned by Noberto Sanchez's Norsan Media, through licensee Norsan Media LLC, it carries a classic regional Mexican format.

== History ==
The station signed on August 1, 1987, in Union County as a contemporary Christian station by the founding general manager, Ken Mayfield. An April sign-on date was delayed by paperwork problems. Artists included Amy Grant, Dion, Dan Peek and Deniece Williams. Russ Jones took over as manager soon after Mayfield's departure in 1989 for WTYC.

By 1992, WNOW was already offering programming from other countries. A two-hour Saturday show called "Gemutlichkeit" originating from Virginia and hosted by Inge Fischer-White included German, Swiss and Austrian music. Also in 1992, Charlotte's Latin American Coalition asked Jones to add Spanish programming.

By 1996, with WRCM playing music, WNOW had switched to Christian talk.

By May 1997, half of WNOW's programming was in Spanish, as various groups added shows. Luis Beltran hosted "RadioSol" starting on April 1, which was two-thirds music, mostly Regional Mexican, along with information such as news from Caracol and Hispanic Radio Network. WNOW aired music, soccer, and Christian programming such as "La Voz De Redencion" ("The Voice of Redemption"). The area's Spanish-speaking population had increased from 12,000 to 75,000 since 1990, though illegal aliens would probably put that number closer to 100,000.

Although WNOW carried the programming of "Radio Lider," this name was owned, and programming produced, by a separate company called Orbimedia Lider Communications Inc.

Orbimedia first began to rent time on WNOW in 1994 and only for a few hours on Saturday afternoons. Later, Orbimedia began to rent larger portions of time and added music programming, a departure from its main talk format. WNOW was the first commercial station in the Carolinas to broadcast entirely in Spanish. The station was doing this by July 1999.

Aura Maria Gavilan-Posse, who was WNOW news director in 1998, was the morning host. Her husband Julian Posse served as president of Orbimedia.

Other shows included "Digalo Sin Miedo" ("Say It Without Fear").

On June 12, 2008, the Carolina Panthers announced a deal with Radio Lider to broadcast all of its games for the coming season in Spanish, making the club the 12th team to do so. Since WNOW is a daytime-only station, all of the preseason games along with the Monday night contest against the Tampa Bay Buccaneers on December 8 were to be carried on a tape-delayed basis, with the remaining games being broadcast live.

On July 5, 2008, Radio Lider ended its broadcasts after Orbimedia and Davidson Media Group could not agree on a price acceptable to both parties for the programming to continue.

On September 1, 2009, Radio Lider La Super Estacion - WNOW 1030AM was acquired by 4M Group and returned to the air with Aura M. Gavilan-Posse, Roble Zarate, Rafael "alias Punch", Claudio Bonus and Richard Bonanno in a new format—News/Talk, sports and music.

In 2011, WNOW became an ESPN Deportes affiliate, with Major League Baseball on Sundays as well as Mexican League Soccer. The station also added the sports talk programs "Cronómetro Deportivo" and "A nivel de Cancha," with Bonus, Bonanno, Monica del Pozo and Saul Rodriguez, which will cover NASCAR, local soccer and other topics.

Davidson Media sold WNOW and eleven other stations to TBLC Holdings, LLC effective November 5, 2015, at a purchase price of $3.5 million.

Effective January 16, 2020, TBLC Media sold WNOW and translator W256BP to Noberto Sanchez's Norsan Media LLC for $500,000.

On May 28, 2025, WNOW and WXNC flipped to Classic Regional Mexican, known as Leyendas.

== History of call letters ==
The call letters WNOW were previously assigned to a station in York, Pennsylvania. It began broadcasting June 22, 1948, on 1250 kHz with 1 KW power (daytime).

== Translator ==
WNOW is additionally relayed by the following FM translator, which operates around the clock:

Broadcast translator for WNOW (AM)
Call sign	Frequency	City of license	FID	ERP (W)	Class	FCC info
W256BP	99.1 FM	Charlotte, North Carolina	156606	250	D	LMS
