= WSAT =

- Salisbury, North Carolina; United States
- Frequency: 1280 kHz
- Branding: Memories Radio

Programming
- Format: Oldies
- Affiliations: Fox News Radio; Carolina Panthers Radio Network

Ownership
- Owner: William Marc Graham; (2B Productions, LLC)
- Sister stations: WSTP

History
- First air date: 1948

Technical information
- Licensing authority: FCC
- Facility ID: 43140
- Class: D
- Power: 850 watts day 130 watts night
- Transmitter coordinates: 35°40′30.00″N 80°30′30.00″W
- Translator: 101.7 W269EE (Salisbury)

Links
- Public license information: Public file; LMS
- Webcast: Listen Live
- Website: salisburyradio.net/

WSAT (1280 AM) is a radio station broadcasting an oldies format. Licensed to Salisbury, North Carolina, United States. The station is currently owned by William Marc Graham, through licensee 2B Productions, LLC Sports coverage on the station includes Catawba College football and men's and women's basketball, area high school sports, the Carolina Panthers of the NFL, and American Legion baseball.

== History ==
WSAT was Salisbury's second radio station, signing on April 25, 1948, on 1280 kHz with 1 KW power (daytime). It was owned by Mid-Carolina Broadcasting Company. Gov. Robert Cherry, school superintendent Charles C. Erwin, Mayor S. Holmes Plexico and PTA president Julian Robertson were part of the first days' broadcasts.

Harry Welch, Sr. took over as general manager in 1953, and for nearly 50 years WSAT was run by someone from the Welch family. It was once known as "The Family Station". Past personalities include Grady Cole, Russ McIntyre, and Bob Mason. Mike Moore, at age 13 in July 1960, began his radio career hosting a "top tunes" show. Moore, now running WLOE/WMYN, continued to work at WSAT until 1966. He believed he was the youngest person working in radio at that time.

Because WAYS could not be heard in Salisbury at night, WSAT started playing Top 40 at night in the late 1960s.

In the 1990s WSAT broadcast an oldies format in the morning, nostalgia/big band and easy listening during the midday hours, and ESPN Radio in the late afternoon. The station was also an affiliate for Atlanta Braves baseball broadcasts.

Former WSAT personality Buddy Poole, hired as a South Rowan High School junior by Harry Welch, Sr. in 1964, bought the station in 2002 from Charles Welch and changed the station to music from the '50s through the '70s "and a little of the '80s." For four years, the station used the Memories format until that format was discontinued by its syndicator ABC Radio Networks in 2006. Until 2015, most of the station's music came from the Dial Global adult standards format that used the on-air brand "America's Best Music". The "memories" music later came from the 1960s, 1970s and 1980s.

In 2004, WSAT added the Carolina Panthers after requests from people who had trouble hearing the games on WBT, which was the only station in the area airing them.

In 2014, CAP Communications, Inc. announced the sale of WSAT to Catawba College Foundation for $600,000. Programming did not change and Poole would continue to run the station, while students at the college would get broadcasting experience. About 23,000 people were listening to the station at the time. The sale was eventually consummated on September 9, 2014 as a license assignment to 2B Productions, LLC. 2B's sole shareholder, William Marc Graham, is an alumnus of Catawba. 2B Productions also bought WSTP.

For several years ending in 2015, the station also aired The Huckabee Report, which was hosted by former Arkansas Governor Mike Huckabee and was the successor program to Paul Harvey's long-running News and Comment program, which the station also aired.

In December 2015, it was announced that 2B Productions would be buying WTIX (which became WEGO October 10, 2018) in Concord. WTIX would simulcast the oldies format of WSAT, with local news, sports and information for an area that also included Concord and Kannapolis. 2B Productions changed its name to Rowan-Cabarrus Radio.

Late in 2016, WSAT added W277DD 103.3 FM. In January 2023, WSAT changed the frequency of W277DD to W269EE 101.7 and started using a new tower in Granite Quarry which would increase the number of listeners who could receive the FM signal from 58,000 to 90,000, adding Granite Quarry, Faith and Rockwell.

Bill Graham of 2B Productions said the Welch family, through Mid-Carolina Broadcasting Company, still owned the land on Jake Alexander Boulevard that was home to WSAT and its tower for 75 years. Late in 2023, the 10.6 acres were for sale for $1.65 million. Assuming Federal Communications Commission approval, WSAT will move its transmitter to the former WSTP tower. The studios were moving to Dorsett Drive.
