= WXNC =

Coordinates: 34°58′45″N 80°30′48″W

- Monroe, North Carolina; United States
- Broadcast area: Charlotte metropolitan area
- Frequency: 1060 kHz
- Branding: Leyendas 99.1 y 97.3 FM

Programming
- Format: Classic Regional Mexican

Ownership
- Owner: Norsan Media; (Norsan Consulting and Management, Inc.)
- Sister stations: WGSP, WGSP-FM, WNOW, WOLS

History
- First air date: 1947
- Former call signs: WMAP (1947–1989); WKRE (1989–2004); WBTB (2004); WXNC (2004–Present)
- Call sign meaning: North Carolina

Technical information
- Licensing authority: FCC
- Facility ID: 57451
- Class: D
- Power: 4,000 watts day 2,400 watts critical hours
- Translator: 97.3 W247CV (Monroe)
- Repeater: 1030 WNOW (Mint Hill)

Links
- Public license information: Public file; LMS
- Website: leyendasclt.com

WXNC (1060 AM) is a commercial radio station in Monroe, North Carolina, serving the Charlotte metropolitan area. It broadcasts a Classic Regional Mexican radio format, branded as “Leyendas” It is owned by Norsan Media. This station also simulcasts on WNOW 1030 AM

WXNC is a daytimer station. By day, WXNC is powered at 4,000 watts, using a non-directional antenna. But because AM 1060 is a clear channel frequency reserved for Class A KYW Philadelphia and XECPAE Mexico City, WXNC must sign off at night to avoid interference. During critical hours, it is powered at 2,400 watts. Programming is heard around the clock on FM translator W247CV at 97.3 MHz.

== History ==
In July 1947, the station first signed on the air as WMAP. It was a 1,000-watt station in Monroe, North Carolina. WMAP added an FM sister station at 102.3. The FM station was later sold off, although today it is co-owned again and is WGSP-FM.

WXNC went dark in 1995. After a two-year absence, it came back as WKRE in March 1997. The studios were later moved to Charlotte. The signal was increased to 5,000 watts.

As a Charlotte-based station, WXNC had a talk radio format known as The Conversation Station. The announcement was made that WXNC would also be heard on WKMT at 1220 AM, also owned by Kevin and Kris Geddings.

Later, the Norsan Group, which already owned 1310 WGSP, bought WXNC, which soon changed to a Spanish language format and began its simulcast of the "La Tremenda" network with WGSP. At one time WGSP-FM (formerly WRML) at 102.3 FM simulcast this station.

On May 28, 2025, at 11:58 pm, WXNC and WNOW flipped from Mainstream Regional Mexican (“La Z”) to Classic Regional Mexican as “Leyendas”
