= WMIT =

Radio station in Black Mountain, North Carolina, United States

- Black Mountain, North Carolina; United States
- Broadcast area: Western North Carolina, Upstate South Carolina and Eastern Tennessee
- Frequency: 106.9 MHz (HD Radio)
- Branding: The Light FM

Programming
- Language: English
- Format: Christian radio
- Subchannels: HD2: Christian rock "theEdge 106.9"

Ownership
- Owner: Billy Graham Evangelistic Association; (Blue Ridge Broadcasting Corporation)
- Sister stations: WFGW, WAVO

History
- First air date: July 26, 1942; 84 years ago (original grant--the current license dates from July 1, 1951)
- Former call signs: W41MM (1941–1943)
- Call sign meaning: Mount Mitchell

Technical information
- Licensing authority: FCC
- Facility ID: 5970
- Class: C
- ERP: 36,000 watts
- HAAT: 942 meters (3,091 ft)
- Transmitter coordinates: 35°44′6.00″N 82°17′10.00″W
- Translators: 94.7 W234CF (Boone); 101.5 W268DM ( Rock Hill, South Carolina); 104.3 W282BP (Matthews); HD2: 106.3 W292CJ (Asheville)
- Repeaters: 106.7 WFGW (Norris, Tennessee); 1150 WAVO (Rock Hill, South Carolina)

Links
- Public license information: Public file; LMS
- Webcast: Listen live
- Website: thelightfm.org

WMIT (106.9 MHz, "106.9 The Light") is an American non-profit FM radio station licensed to Black Mountain, North Carolina. The station serves Western North Carolina, Upstate South Carolina and Eastern Tennessee, including the Asheville, Charlotte, Greenville-Spartanburg and Tri-Cities metropolitan areas.

WMIT is a listener-supported ministry of the Billy Graham Evangelistic Association. It airs a mix of Contemporary Christian music with some Christian talk and teaching programs, including national religious leaders Jim Daly, John MacArthur, David Jeremiah, Chuck Swindoll and Charles Stanley. Its studios and offices are on Porters Cove Road in Asheville.

Programming is simulcast in the Charlotte area on full-power WAVO (1150 AM) in Rock Hill, South Carolina, and low-powered FM translators W282BP (104.3 MHz) in Matthews, North Carolina and W268DM (101.5 MHz) in Rock Hill. In the North Carolina High Country, WMIT is simulcast on low-powered W234CF (94.7 MHz) in Boone, North Carolina. Most of WMIT's schedule is also simulcast on 106.7 WFGW in the Knoxville, Tennessee radio market.

In 2007, WMIT began broadcasting in the HD Radio format, adding "theEdge 106.9" on the HD2 digital subchannel. It features Christian rock music for teenagers and young adults, which is also heard on translator W292CJ (106.3 FM) in Asheville.

== "Superpower" coverage ==
WMIT has one of the largest coverage areas for an FM radio station in the Eastern United States. It claims a potential audience of five million people in North Carolina, South Carolina, Tennessee, Virginia and Georgia. This is because its transmitter is located on Clingmans Peak, with the combined mountain and transmitter tower elevation at over 6,700 feet (2,000 m) above sea level, with the highest transmitter site east of the Mississippi River. Its transmitter rises 180 feet (55 m) above 6,557-foot (1,999 m) on Clingmans Peak, putting WMIT tower's light higher than anything else east of the Mississippi.

Its effective radiated power (ERP) is 36,000 watts. Many FM stations nearby run at 100,000 watts but their towers are only a third the height of WMIT. Due to its unusual height above average terrain (HAAT), WMIT is grandfathered with a "superpower" signal.

In addition to its home market of Asheville, WMIT provides at least secondary coverage to large portions of the Greenville/Spartanburg, Charlotte, and Tri-Cities markets. Long before the installation of the translators and the WAVO simulcast, WMIT had a particularly large following in the Charlotte area, garnering a 1.4 rating in the Charlotte market in January 2014. Since 2014, WMIT has identified as "Black Mountain/Charlotte/Asheville" to acknowledge its large listenership in the Charlotte area, which has as many people as the rest of its coverage area combined. However, it could only be heard clearly in the market's western portion until the addition of the translators and the WAVO simulcast.

== History ==
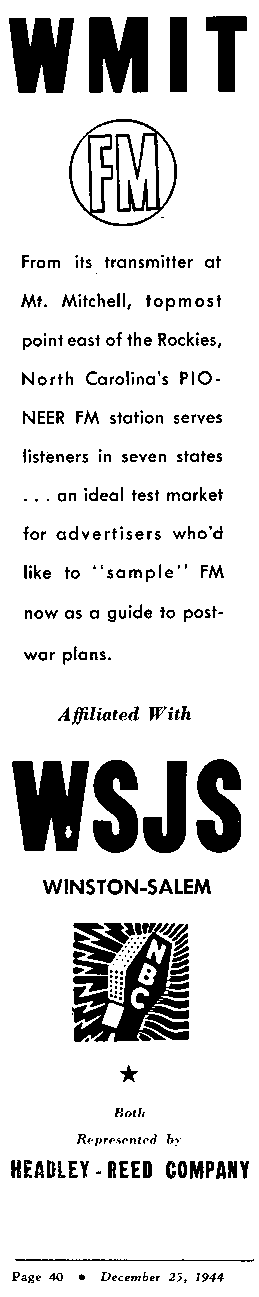
Until 1947, WMIT studios were located with co-owned AM station WSJS in Winston-Salem, North Carolina.

WMIT was the first FM station in North Carolina, and among the earliest in the United States. On May 24, 1940, the Federal Communications Commission (FCC) announced the establishment, effective January 1, 1941, of an FM radio band consisting of 40 channels spanning 42–50 MHz, with the first five channels (42.1 to 42.9 MHz) reserved for educational stations, and the other 35 (43.1 to 49.9 MHz) available for commercial operation. WMIT was first authorized on August 25, 1941, as W41MM, for 50,000 watts on 44.1 MHz. The station was licensed to 32-year-old Gordon Gray, described as "one of the nation's wealthiest young men", who was president of the Piedmont Publishing Company, publishers of the Winston-Salem Journal and Twin City Sentinel, and owner of AM radio station WSJS in Winston-Salem.

The entry of the United States into World War II later that year caused construction delays. After a couple months of test transmissions, W41MM began regular programming on the evening of July 26, 1942. Its initial schedule was 3 to 9 p.m. daily. Due to the wartime shortages, it initially broadcast with 3,000 watts. Programming which did not originate at the transmitter site was relayed from WSJS studios by a Studio/transmitter link (STL) radio link. At first diesel engines provided electricity for the transmitter, but eventually power lines were installed. A two-story building was constructed at the transmitter site, housing the transmitter equipment. Living space was included for station engineers needing to stay during difficult winter weather when the road to the top was impassable.

The station's transmitter was 6,885 feet (2,099 m) above sea level. Originally licensed to Winston-Salem, 105 miles (169 km) away, the station operated by remote telephone line. The Winston-Salem studios were eventually housed in a two-story building built in 1942 at 419 Spruce Street by the Winston-Salem Journal and The Twin City Sentinel for their AM station WSJS.

Effective November 1, 1943, the FCC modified its policy for FM station call letters, and the call sign was changed to WMIT, standing for Mount Mitchell, the highest mountain east of the Mississippi River, located about 2 1/2 miles northeast of the transmitter site. After the FM band was reassigned to 88-108 MHz, WMIT moved to 97.3 MHz.

In 1947, WSJS was authorized to establish its own FM station, WSJS-FM. Contemporary FCC rules disallowed more than one station on a given band from operating in a common studio site, so WMIT's studios were relocated from Winston-Salem to Charlotte, 90 miles (140 km) away. Much of the music was classical or beautiful music, though three hours a day of local, regional music was played due to listener interest. In 1948, WMIT was issued a Construction Permit to change its transmitting frequency to 106.9 MHz. The station eventually increased its ERP power to 75 kw.

In April 1950, WMIT ceased broadcasting. In a letter to the FCC, Gordon Gray wrote: "With considerable regret I have decided to discontinue the operation of WMIT after April 13, 1950. After that date any outstanding licenses will be returned to the Commission for cancellation. I had hoped that we might be able to find a purchaser who would take over and continue the operation but we have not been successful along that line." The license for WMIT was deleted on April 26.

In December 1950, an application was filed by Mount Mitchell Broadcasters, Inc., headed by Charlotte investment banker W. Olin Nisbet, Jr., for use of the "former facilities of Gordon Gray - WMIT", specifying operation with 325 kw on 106.9 MHz. This was approved early the next year. Although technically this was a new station, because it revived the WMIT call letters and operated on the same frequency from the same transmitter site, it has generally been considered to be a continuation of the original WMIT authorized in 1941. The new studio location was in Black Mountain.

WMIT returned to the air on July 1, 1951. WMIT could be picked up in Atlanta, Georgia, 190 miles (310 km) away. Six and a half million potential listeners could receive the signal.

In 1955, the station was issued a Construction Permit that reduced its power to 36 kw. Billy Graham's ministry purchased WMIT in 1962. At first Graham used the station to broadcast Christian instructional and preaching programs, hosted by Graham and other religious leaders, but around 2000, shifted its focus to airing a music-oriented Christian contemporary format, with some instructional and preaching programs during the day.

On October 12, 2023, the station's transmitter site at Clingmans Peak was designated the "'Munn Communications Facility", in memory of E. Harold Munn, Jr., who had served as a long-time member and officer of the Blue Ridge Broadcasting board of directors.
