= WOLS =

Radio station in Waxhaw–Charlotte, North Carolina

Coordinates: 34.884°N 80.793°W

- Waxhaw, North Carolina; United States
- Broadcast area: Charlotte/Metrolina
- Frequency: 106.1 MHz
- Branding: La Raza 106.1

Programming
- Format: Regional Mexican

Ownership
- Owner: Norsan Broadcasting; (WOLS Operating, LLC)
- Sister stations: WGSP, WGSP-FM, WXNC, WNOW

History
- First air date: March 1, 1995
- Former call signs: WLWW (1991-1995); WIST-FM (1995-1996); WNMX (1996); WNMX-FM (1996-2008)
- Call sign meaning: Oldies (previous format)

Technical information
- Licensing authority: FCC
- Facility ID: 68809
- Class: C2
- ERP: 21,000 watts
- HAAT: 188 meters

Links
- Public license information: Public file; LMS
- Website: La Raza Charlotte

WOLS (106.1 MHz) is a Regional Mexican radio station, owned by Norsan Media. Licensed to Waxhaw, North Carolina, the station identifies itself as “La Raza 106.1”. The station’s studios are located in Charlotte, North Carolina, and the transmitter is located in Catawba, South Carolina.

== History ==
In 1994, 1480 AM, a frequency that had been silent for several years, was reactivated with the call letters WIST. GHB Broadcasting operated WIST through a Limited Marketing Agreement (LMA) with Christ Covenant Church, the licensee for 1480 AM. Most of the adult standards music came from the Satellite Music Network format Stardust. A year later, the FM station signed on, initially using the call letters WLWW but eventually changed to WIST-FM.

The name WNMX "Mix 106" was chosen in 1996. The station's sales manager had previously worked for WMXC (104.7) when it was called "The Mix". He hoped to resurrect that format on 106.1. The AM station became WNMX-AM.. By this time the AM aired some separate programs, including a talk show from John Sullivan. The AM became WTLT in Summer 1997 with a separate news/talk format. As of May 1997, when GHB planned a medical office building on Randolph Road where the company was considering moving its operations, WNMX had "nearly doubled its morning audience share" in a year.

For one month WNMX tried a more contemporary sound with local DJs during the day. However, many listeners protested so the station returned to the Stardust format.

Over the years the definition of adult standards has evolved, and the Stardust satellite format evolved with the times as well. Fewer songs from the big band era were played, though new performances of the old songs have become available. When oldies station WWMG changed its format to "rhythmic Top 40" music in 2004, WNMX added more rock and roll songs to its local morning show.

In Summer 2006 ABC merged Stardust with its Memories format. The merger caused Stardust to leave its standards heritage behind, playing most of the same "timeless favorites" but moving more in an oldies direction, with most of the big-band standards being recent recordings. WNMX still played many of the older records on the local morning show. Ironically, the Timeless Favorites format had evolved into the format that listeners rejected in 1997.

On February 12, 2008 WNMX changed their format to 60s-70s oldies, branded as "Oldies 106.1", with the "Goodtime Oldies" format from the Jones Radio Network. "Goodtime Oldies" features a playlist of 60's and 70's oldies. The station also changed its call sign to WOLS, which was moved from an AM station in Florence, South Carolina. That station took on the call sign "WOLH".

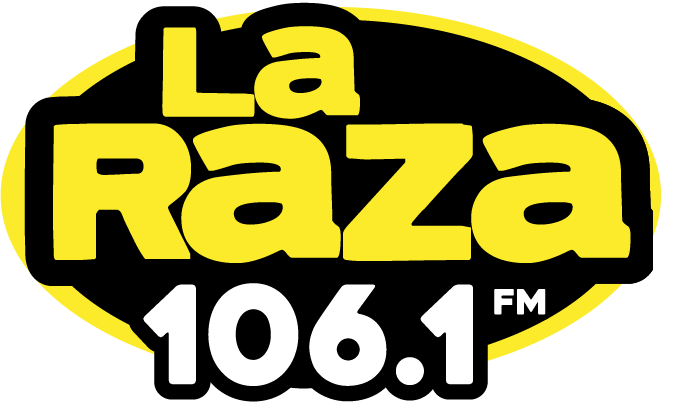
Previous logo

On January 1, 2009, Norsan Media took over WOLS, picking up "La Raza," the Regional Mexican format of WGSP-FM.

== Sports broadcasts ==
At one time, WOLS carried broadcasts of several sports teams. At the time of the change to Spanish language programming, these broadcasts were the only English language programming on WOLS.

WOLS was the flagship station for the NBA's Charlotte Bobcats from the team's debut in 2004 through the 2008-2009 season. At the end of that season, WFNZ, an all-sports station, took over as the Bobcats flagship station.

WOLS also carried football and basketball games of the ACC's Duke Blue Devils, which like WOLS' broadcast of Bobcats games, ended with the switch to Spanish language programming.

WOLS had broadcast the games of the WNBA's Charlotte Sting prior to the team's ceasing operations on January 2, 2007.

Starting with the 2010 NFL season, WOLS began broadcasting all Carolina Panthers games in Spanish.

In 2022, WOLS began carrying Charlotte FC games in Spanish.
