= WSVM =

- Valdese, North Carolina; United States
- Broadcast area: Hickory-Lenoir-Morganton
- Frequency: 1490 kHz
- Branding: Best Mix 96.5 WSVM

Programming
- Format: Adult hits

Ownership
- Owner: Main Street Broadcasting, Inc.

History
- First air date: October 6, 1961
- Call sign meaning: "We Serve Valdese Merchants"; "We Serve Valdese, Morganton"; "We Serve a Variety of Music"

Technical information
- Licensing authority: FCC
- Facility ID: 32392
- Class: C
- Power: 1,000 watts
- Transmitter coordinates: 35°44′3.47″N 81°34′3.34″W
- Translator: 96.5 W243DV (Valdese)

Links
- Public license information: Public file; LMS
- Webcast: Listen live
- Website: www.wsvmradio.com

WSVM (1490 AM) is a radio station broadcasting an adult hits format, Licensed to Valdese, North Carolina, United States, it serves Burke, Caldwell, Lincoln, Catawba, Alexander, Cleveland and Gaston counties. The station is owned by Main Street Broadcasting, Inc.

== History ==
WSVM signed on October 6, 1961.

The station's call letters are said to stand for "We Serve Valdese Merchants". Another popular belief is the letters mean "We Serve Valdese, Morganton" and since its arrival on the FM dial, it means "We Serve a Variety of Music".

During most of the first decade of the 21st century, WSVM aired the Timeless format, and was owned by Burke County Broadcasting, principals being Robert R. Hilker, William R. Rollins and various Valdese merchants. Both Hilker & Rollins were both past presidents of the North Carolina Association of Broadcasting and in the North Carolina Broadcasting Hall of Fame. WSVM was part of Suburban Radio Group, owned by Hilker & Rollins. Charlie Hicks worked at the station from 1969 to 1970 before taking the helm at another Suburban Radio Group affiliate.

Later on, the station was sold to GHB Broadcasting Company.

In August 2008, GHB Broadcasting sold WSVM to Radio Emmanuel, and the format was to be changed to Christian music, with most of the programming in Spanish. This did not happen.

In later years, local programming on WSVM included Clegg and Company, hosted by Jerry Clegg, and The Trading Post.

WSVM ceased operations May 31, 2010, for the "immediate future". The last song was "May the Good Lord Bless and Keep You" by Jim Reeves.

The station came back on the air September 1, 2010, by Bannon Broadcasting Company of Hudson operates and manages the day-to-day operation. Jim Bannon operated WSVM with classic hits of the decades of the 1960s, 1970s and 1980s (rock oldies), plus high school sports. WSVM calls itself V-radio for Valdese. The station is automated except for the "Breakfast Club" morning show. and a few other local programs.

After Bannon Broadcasting Company decided to allow its lease on WSVM to expire on January 2, 2012, GHB of Waxhaw reached a deal to sell the station to the town of Valdese, which planned to use the property for an expansion of a neighboring cemetery. Bert Lindsay bought the WSVM broadcast license from GHB and began running the station prior to the sale's becoming finalized on September 27, 2012, at a purchase price of $12,000. He continued the station's format, including The Trading Post from 10 to 11 six mornings a week, as well as Draughn High School sports; East Burke High School sports will be added. Also being considered are beach music and doo-wop programs, and the return of the Beatles Brunch.

=== Main Street Broadcasting ===
The town of Valdese sold the WSVM broadcast equipment to Main Street Broadcasting and is no longer affiliated with the station. The Praley Street studios have been listed as "residential" since Main Street Broadcasting bought the station.

WSVM operated from a satellite studio in Baton, North Carolina, while construction on the new studio building at 225 West Main Street Valdese was being completed.

Bert Lindsay sold WSVM to Mainstreet Broadcasting effective October 20, 2016, for $9,000. Vance Patterson and Eddie Jolly's company Main Street Broadcasting bought the station equipment from the Town of Valdese and vacated the Praley Street location. WSVM received authorization from the FCC to operate a translator for the Valdese area on 96.5 FM and has been broadcasting since February 3, 2017.

In September 2018, WSVM moved into new studios designed by broadcast engineer Michael Griffin and located at 225 Main Street, Valdese, North Carolina. WSVM began broadcasting live shows from the new studios. Live and Local from Main Street Valdese. The station started getting nationwide attention after a video by Tony Lee Glenn showcases Vice President Eddie Jolly and the station on YouTube. WSVM won "Business of the year 2022" in November 2022.

== Translator ==
Call sign	Frequency	City of license	FID	ERP (W)	Class	Transmitter coordinates	FCC info
W243DV	96.5 FM	Valdese, North Carolina	88564	250	D	35°43′22.5″N 81°36′27.3″W	LMS
