= WGNC (AM) =

- Gastonia, North Carolina; United States
- Frequency: 1450 kHz

Programming
- Format: Talk and sports
- Affiliations: USA Radio News; Fox Sports Radio; Premiere Networks; Atlanta Braves Radio Network; Gastonia Honey Hunters; Washington Commanders Radio Network

Ownership
- Owner: Scott Neisler

History
- Call sign meaning: Gastonia, North Carolina

Technical information
- Licensing authority: FCC
- Facility ID: 35657
- Class: C
- Power: 1,000 watts unlimited
- Transmitter coordinates: 35°16′32″N 81°12′4″W
- Translator: 101.1 W266DC (Gastonia)

Links
- Public license information: Public file; LMS
- Webcast: Listen live
- Website: www.wgncradio.com

WGNC (1450 kHz) is a commercial AM radio station broadcasting a talk and sports radio format. It is licensed to Gastonia, North Carolina, and is owned by Scott Neisler.

WGNC is powered at 1,000 watts, using a non-directional antenna. Programming is also heard on 220 watt FM translator W266DC in Gastonia, at 101.1 MHz.

== Programming ==
Weekdays begin with a morning local news and information show, followed by syndicated talk shows from Glenn Beck and Dave Ramsey. World and national news are provided by USA Radio News.

Nights and weekends feature sports programming from Fox Sports Radio. The station is an affiliate of the Atlanta Braves Radio Network. It is the largest radio affiliate network in Major League Baseball. WGNC also is an affiliate of the Washington Commanders Radio Network. Local high school football and college football games are also broadcast, along with games featuring the Gastonia Honey Hunters.

== History ==
Doug McSwain's father Pat McSwain started the AM station, WGNC, in 1939 and the FM station, WGNC-FM, in 1947 (now WBAV-FM). The younger McSwain was vice president and general manager of WGNC when the family sold both stations to Beasley Broadcast Group in 1986.

Six years after buying WCSL in Cherryville, Calvin Hastings bought WGNC and started KTC Broadcasting. In 1992 he bought WOHS in Shelby and began calling the three stations Piedmont Superstations.

WCSL, WGNC and WOHS began airing Atlanta Braves baseball in 1993. WGNC had served as the radio home of the Gastonia Rangers minor league team from 1990 to 1992.

On April 1, 1993, KTC took over WLON in Lincolnton in a lease agreement. WLON's Tim Biggerstaff remained as morning disc jockey, and his show was heard on all four KTC stations. Local news was expanded. The four stations aired North Carolina Tar Heels football and basketball, Dallas Cowboys and Washington Redskins football, and CBS Radio Sports coverage of such events as the World Series and the Super Bowl.

The four stations added the Carolina Panthers when the team began playing in 1995. They also aired basketball games of the Charlotte Hornets. In 2000, the stations began airing the Redskins again instead of the Panthers (WGNC aired the Panthers if there was no conflict).

Late in 1999, the four stations changed from country music to "super oldies". Biggerstaff, the program director, said country had moved away from its traditional sound. Lillie White remained as midday host, and Andy Foster was afternoon host. Local and sports remained important, and the stations aired the One on One Sports radio network at night.

In 2004, Biggerstaff was still hosting his show on WCSL and WLON despite diabetes-related health problems. Later he moved to Lincolnton-based Hometown Radio's Shelby operation. On WADA he played classic country music, and he hosted a "Swap Shop" show on WGNC and WOHS. By this time he had experienced a kidney transplant and two pancreas transplants. On Memorial Day 2007, while on the air, Biggerstaff had a seizure and asked for help on the air, and a listener called 911. He ended up being interviewed by BBC London, Today and People Magazine.

On November 22, 2014, Sports on Tap with Kuveikis and The Dude debuted on WGNC. In the summer of 2016 WGNC added an FM translator on 101.1 MHz. On August 20, 2016, The Sports Brunch with Mojo and Kuveikis] debuted on WGNC. On February 3, 2017, WGNC became an affiliate for NBC Sports Radio.

As of February 2024, the AM signal appeared to be off the air, due to lack of maintenance.
