= WEGO (AM) =

- Concord, North Carolina; United States
- Broadcast area: Charlotte, North Carolina
- Frequency: 1410 kHz

Programming
- Format: Oldies

Ownership
- Owner: William Marc Graham; (2B Productions LLC)
- Sister stations: WSAT; WSTP

History
- First air date: 1942
- Last air date: 2022
- Former call signs: WEGO (1942–2009); WTIX (2009–2018)

Technical information
- Licensing authority: FCC
- Facility ID: 13555
- Class: D
- Power: 1,000 watts day; 67 watts night
- Transmitter coordinates: 35°24′43″N 80°36′41″W

Links
- Public license information: Public file; LMS

WEGO (1410 kHz) was an AM radio station licensed to serve Concord, North Carolina. The station operated from 1942 to 2022.

== History ==
The 1410 spot on the dial was first heard from Concord, North Carolina, in 1942. WEGO was owned by Wayne M. Nelson, who constructed the station's studios along Highway 29 (now Concord Parkway), just west of the city. In 1953, the city's newspaper, The Concord Tribune (now Independent-Tribune) purchased the station. Over the next few years, WEGO began airing local newscasts, in addition to the Associated Press wire stories and the T-N News Network. In 1960, The Tribune sold WEGO to the Suburban Radio Group (SRG) of Belmont, North Carolina, which began the station's greatest period of growth and popularity. In 1961, WEGO-FM was launched, and a few years later, general manager Jim Keel renamed it WPEG, the call sign of a newly acquired SRG station in Winston-Salem. Keel encouraged a more contemporary presentation on WEGO. Announcer Gene Hinson launched "The Show Without a Name" and gained a sizeable teen audience every afternoon. Other popular announcers on the station during this period included Bob Raiford, Jack Becknell, Chief Engineer Ken Kennedy and Richard Irwin. The station dropped the last vestiges of block programming, and began airing a full-time "Easy Top-40" format. Popular announcers on the station in these years included Jay Driggers, John Stiles, Bill Biggerstaff, Gary Walker and Dick Reid Norwood. Broadcaster Charlie Hicks was a program host and general manager of the station from 1969-80.

Throughout the 1970s, WEGO went through a succession of formats as competition tightened in the market. By 1980, the station was automated through most of its daytime broadcasting hours, and alternated format choices over those years between country and oldies. Station managers included Jim Mintzer and Mark Herman. The "Mark In The Morning" show became a popular morning drive staple on WEGO in the mid-1980s. Mark Herman alternated music with funny bits/voices coupled with news reports and contests. With improved profitability, The Suburban Radio Group began courting a purchaser for the station. In 1985, that purchaser was found in former station Manager Charlie Hicks. Soon after his purchase of WEGO, the station's format changed to oldies. While the transmitter remained at the Highway 29 location, Hicks moved the studios of the station to 70 Cabarrus Avenue West, three blocks from downtown Concord. It was the first studio move in the 49-year history of the station. After owning WEGO for eight years, and purchasing WABZ-FM in Albemarle, Hicks sold the two stations back to Suburban in 1993. Suburban ran WEGO until its sale to GHB Broadcasting in 2003. For several years ending in 2008, WEGO aired the "Stardust" adult standards format from ABC Radio, which later called itself "Timeless" and emphasized soft oldies. The morning announcer was Bob Brown and news was covered by Mark Plemmons. In late November, 2008, GHB announced that the WEGO studios were being consolidated with GHB's other broadcast properties in a studio complex on North Tryon Street in Charlotte. The format changed back to adult standards as WEGO began simulcasting Rock Hill, South Carolina station WAVO. WEGO closed its Concord studio and ended all of the station's local programming, except church services, which could no longer be aired live. Prior to the move and consolidation, the station was an affiliate of the Atlanta Braves radio network, the largest radio affiliate network in Major League Baseball.

"The Bob and Mark Show" and "The Trading Post," plus other community-oriented programming, including sports, re-appeared on the Radio Free Cabarrus web site. Mark Plemmons served as general manager, news director and sports director. Morning in America with Bill Bennett became the morning show for the combined on-air stations, and SRN News was added.

WEGO changed its call sign to WTIX at the end of 2009, in a call sign shift designed to protect GHB Broadcasting‘s historical New Orleans base call sign. Following extensive damage from Hurricane Katrina which forced the original WTIX off the air, there was concern that the New Orleans station would not return to the air in time air to keep the call sign within the company without moving it to another station. The call sign moved from Concord to the former WAAA in Winston-Salem, North Carolina, before the Concord station re-acquired the WEGO call sign in 2018.

Early in 2010, WAVO/WTIX added two sports talk programs. Bryce Johnson began hosting "Sports Yapp" at 9 A.M. weekdays in February. On April 5 the show began airing an hour earlier. Also, on April 3, Chris Pardo, who moved to York County, South Carolina in 2008, began hosting "New York City Sports Talk", two hours long starting at noon on both Saturday and Sunday. Pardo, the son of announcer Don Pardo, said that WFNZ rarely offered news about New York sports. He found that others from New York wished there was more coverage of their teams. Pardo publicized the show on web sites and by handing out information to people wearing team apparel. Pardo has since come to realize he is no longer in New York. On July 4, 2010, WAVO/WTIX added "Crank and Case", an automobile advice program similar to Car Talk, hosted by mechanics Chuck Sperry and Stick Case Roneis. WTIX continued to broadcast from the same antenna on U.S. 29 until November 2011. During part of that month, WTIX went off the air during a switch to a new tower expected to improve the station's signal. When WTIX came back March 4, 2012, it was called "Country Legends 1410 WTIX". The studios are located off Church Street in Concord. A local morning show began April 2, hosted by Mac McCoy, who once did traffic reports on WBT in Charlotte under the monicker of Jeff Pilot and as Magic 96.1's Sky King. the return to local programming in Concord proved unsuccessful, because in 2014, WTIX began simulcasting WHVN "Heaven Radio".

In December 2015, it was announced that Catawba College Foundation and 2B Productions would be buying WTIX. WTIX began simulcasting the oldies format of WSAT in Salisbury, with local news, sports and information for an area that will also include Concord and Kannapolis. 2B Productions changed its name to Rowan-Cabarrus Radio, and Catawba students will train for journalism and communications careers on its three stations. The purchase, at a price of $65,000, was consummated on January 11, 2016. In 2016, WTIX added a translator W252DI at 98.3 FM and the station was called "Memories 98.3".

The WEGO call sign returned to the station on October 10, 2018.

At the end of 2022, the Independent Tribune reported that the Educational Media Foundation had purchased W252DI to broadcast Air1. The future of WEGO was uncertain, but it was described as "dead on the air".

2B Productions surrendered WEGO's license to the Federal Communications Commission on December 21, 2023, and it was cancelled the same day.
