= WULR =

- York, South Carolina; United States
- Broadcast area: Charlotte/Metrolina
- Frequency: 980 kHz
- Branding: Praise 980

Programming
- Format: Spanish language Christian talk and teaching

Ownership
- Owner: Iglesia Nueva Vida of High Point
- Sister stations: WDYT, WGOS

History
- First air date: April 19, 1956
- Former call signs: WYCL (1956–1978); WBZK (1978–2008)

Technical information
- Licensing authority: FCC
- Facility ID: 74380
- Class: D
- Power: 3,000 watts day 167 watts night
- Transmitter coordinates: 34°54′11″N 81°05′33″W

Links
- Public license information: Public file; LMS
- Website: CadenaRadialNuevaVida.com

WULR (980 AM) is a commercial radio station in York, South Carolina, and serving the Charlotte metropolitan area. The station license is owned by Iglesia Nueva Vida of High Point. WULR broadcasts a Spanish language Christian talk and teaching radio format.

By day, WULR is powered at 3,000 watts, using a directional antenna. But to avoid interfering with other stations on 980 AM, it reduces power at night to 167 watts. The station uses a two-tower array.

== History ==
Curtis Sigmon signed on WYCL at 1580 AM on April 19, 1956, with 250 watts. The station later moved to 980 AM and increased power to 1,000 watts. In April 1978, its call letters changed to WBZK. WDZK, at 99.3 FM in Chester, signed on in 1969.

For five years before the 1986–87 season, WDZK broadcast Winthrop University men's basketball.

On January 20, 1988, after 31 years as a day time-only station, WBZK broadcast at night for the first time, reducing its power after dark from 1,000 watts to 290 watts. This meant better coverage of local government and sports, which included Clemson Tigers basketball and York Comprehensive High School football. The station continued to simulcast the adult contemporary music of its sister FM WDZK except for Sunday morning religious programming. York High games had been broadcast on the next day on tape. WDZK had broadcast Chester High School football for 20 years.

In 1990, WDZK moved from a tower three miles south of Chester to a 495-foot tower, the highest in the area, 10 miles north of Chester. WDZK increased its power from 3,000 to 6,000 watts. WBZK also moved to two new towers south of Rock Hill and increased power to 3,500 watts, giving the station six times as many listeners.

In 1993, WBZK and WDZK broadcast several Clemson women's basketball games, the first area stations to do so. In the same year, WDZK broadcast Charlotte Knights baseball.

In 1994, now-retired broadcaster and journalist Jon Mayhew worked the 9am to 5pm Monday through Friday airshifts. He also worked the weekends, producing a teen-oriented talk show on Saturday and overseeing the broadcast of Sunday morning religious programming. Mayhew left the station in mid-1994 for a stint at the Piedmont Superstations Radio Network, which was based at WOHS radio in Shelby. Mayhew, who lived in Mooresville, said the drive would be shorter to Shelby from Mooresville than from Mooresville to York, SC.

In 1995, the Sigmon family sold WBZK-FM to the owners of WBT in nearby Charlotte, North Carolina after owning the station for 26 years. The family kept the AM, which played oldies and beach music.

WBZK began 24-hour broadcasts in 1995.

In July 2000, Carolina Metro Radio LLC (Edward A. Baker, managing member/33.33% owner) reached an agreement to purchase WBZK from York Clover Broadcasting Co. (C. Curtis Sigmon, president) for a reported sale price of $500,000. At the time of the sale, WBZK was broadcasting a beach music format.

At one time, WBZK broadcast Spanish Christian programming.

Osiris Collazos hosted the "Amanecer en America" ("Wake Up America") morning show on "La Maxima".

980 AM Inc acquired WBZK in September 2008. According to the documentation of the sale, 980 AM Inc was owned by Michael B. and Dara Glinter. WBZK was exchanged for station WPYR in Louisiana with no money changing hands, according to the agreement filed with the FCC. At the same time, the station's call sign was changed to WULR.

Before its switch to Christian talk, WBZK's programming consisted largely of contemporary Christian music. The music was programmed on an automated basis rather than having live-on air personalities. WBZK had relatively few interruptions between songs for commercials or other non-musical items. Songs were often played back-to-back with no bumpers in between.

According to industry reports, the Glinters have relocated to South Carolina from Florida and wanted to operate a radio station near their new home. Truth Broadcasting paid $400,000, minus a security deposit and credit for the tower lease, for WULR and began operating the station on August 16, 2010, broadcasting the same programming as WCRU in Dallas, North Carolina.

On January 1, 2013, WULR was swapped to Iglesia Nueva Vida of High Point, North Carolina in exchange for the license to WEGO and $46,501.73.
