= Charlie Hicks =

American radio broadcaster (1939–2015)

Charles A. Hicks (January 4, 1939, Marion, North Carolina – May 12, 2015), also known as "Charlie B", was an American broadcaster familiar to listeners in radio markets throughout the southeastern United States. He worked in the field for 55 years.

Hicks got his start in 1954 as a late night disc jockey at WHBT in Harriman, Tennessee, at the age of 16. He did a stint as a reporter and sports anchor for WLOS-TV in Asheville, North Carolina, where he covered the fatal crash of Piedmont Airlines Flight 22 on July 19, 1967.

In the early 1960s Hicks was working at radio station WSEV in Sevierville, Tennessee, when a then-unknown and teenage Dolly Parton began singing live in the studio to launch her career.

In April 1963, while working as a reporter for WGAD in Gadsden, Alabama, Hicks interviewed civil rights activist William L. Moore minutes before the latter was murdered along rural U.S. Highway 11. Afterwards Hicks gave testimony before a Federal grand jury in Gadsden. Documentary filmmaker Keith Beauchamp interviewed Hicks about his recollections of the incident for a segment of the Investigation Discovery television series The Injustice Files.

Later in his career Hicks held positions of vice-president and general manager with Suburban Radio Group and Capitol Broadcasting Company, both headquartered in North Carolina. He was general manager of radio stations WEGO in Concord, North Carolina, WKEE in Huntington, West Virginia, and WABZ in Albemarle, North Carolina.

Hicks retired from broadcasting in 2009.
