= WSTP =

- Salisbury, North Carolina; United States
- Frequency: 1490 kHz

Programming
- Format: Classic country

Ownership
- Owner: William Marc Graham; (2B Productions, LLC)
- Sister stations: WSAT

History
- First air date: December 31, 1939
- Call sign meaning: W Salisbury Times and Post

Technical information
- Licensing authority: FCC
- Facility ID: 74075
- Class: C
- Power: 600 watts unlimited
- Transmitter coordinates: 35°41′18″N 80°29′44″W

Links
- Public license information: Public file; LMS
- Webcast: Listen Live
- Website: salisburyradio.net/

WSTP (1490 AM) is a radio station licensed to and serving the area of Salisbury, North Carolina, United States.

== History ==
WSTP signed on New Year's Eve 1939 from the Yadkin Hotel ballroom. Its letters stood for "Salisbury Times and Post", the town's morning and afternoon newspapers. The Hurley Family who owned the Post were also part owners of WSTP. The station aired the Rose Bowl in 1940. Salisbury eventually became the state's smallest town with two radio stations and a daily newspaper.

Mae, Nancy and Nell Kendrick were called "The Three Little Sisters" and "The Singing Sisters" in the 1940s, when they worked for WSTP at a time when it was above the Meroney Theatre.

On November 22, 1963 and for several days after that, WSTP switched to all classical music, commercial-free, with breaks for news.

Tom Harrell and Mary Ann Lanningham owned WSTP from 1956 to July 1, 1995, and Harrell served as general manager. He hired Bill Henderson, morning host from 1963 to 1975. During his tenure, WSTP-FM became WRDX and began airing its own programming. Harrell hired over 200 people over the years, many of them high school and college students, and he said a lot of those who started their careers at WSTP stayed in radio or a related field

Also during the early-to-mid-1970s WSTP put out a weekly "top 40 type list" which was available at local retailers and record shops. The station was known as the "Top 40 Rock of The Piedmont" and then, during the disco era, "15 Fever". David Whisenant once played disco music while people learned to dance right in the studio.

WSTP personalities who went on to become famous were Cincinnati Reds voice Marty Brennaman, Bob Rathbun and Helen Little.

Doug Rice, president and general manager and a co-anchor for Performance Racing Network, joined WSTP in 1977, working a variety of on-air jobs and eventually becoming morning host and program director. He also served as play-by-play announcer for Catawba College football for nearly a decade, and color analyst for Howard Platt for Catawba basketball. Sports coverage also included the Washington Redskins, high school sports and American Legion baseball. Other programming included election coverage, parades, daily obituaries, and church services. Liz Tennant, whose parents designed the station's building, did the farm reports.

Dalton Group, owner of WWMG in Charlotte, bought WSTP and WRDX in 1995 for $3 million and began operating the stations under a local marketing agreement.

Prior to March 1, 2015 the station was owned by Rowan Media Inc., with a News/Talk format. Programming included G. Gordon Liddy, Dr. Laura, Bill O'Reilly, and The Savage Nation (Michael Savage). Dr. Laura was on WSTP for 15 years until she moved to SiriusXM on January 4, 2011. Fred Thompson was replaced with Steve Malzberg when Thompson dropped his show January 20, 2011. Other programs on the station at that time were The Laura Ingraham Show, Rusty Humphries, Jim Bohannon and Coast to Coast Overnight. WSTP also aired WBTV News from 5:00 to 6:30 during the week.

WSTP carried Gary Burbank on Saturday morning for ten years ending in 2005. He was replaced with The Money Pit and Kim Komando. Other weekend programming included Todd Feinberg, who was new, and Tom Martino.

The station was an affiliate of the Atlanta Braves radio network, the largest radio affiliate network in Major League Baseball. WSTP was also affiliated with the Tar Heel Sports Network, a division of Learfield Sports.

Kent Bernhardt, PRN production coordinator, started working at WSTP in 1977, co-hosted the morning show from 1995 to 2000 and from 2008 to 2015, working for PRN for the eight years in between. His partner on WSTP was Howard Platt, who had done sports on WSTP since 1978. Platt was North Carolina Sportscaster of the Year in 2004. Platt interviewed many famous people for National Sportscasters and Sportswriters Association events and the Bing Crosby golf tournament in Bermuda Run, including Flip Wilson, Bob Hope, Bobby Knight, Michael Jordan and Jim Valvano. When Bernhardt left, Mark Brown replaced him.

A September 10, 2013 legal notice said the property owned by Timothy and Lisa Coates where the radio station was located would be sold as a result of foreclosure by NewBridge Bank. On September 11, Mike Mangan, who owned WSTP along with Timothy Coates, assured listeners, "WSTP is alive and kicking, as it has been since Jan. 1, 1939 ... This station is a pillar in the community." The bank decided not to include the building in the sale but did not say why.

After Catawba College Foundation (through 2B Productions LLC) bought WSAT in May 2014, the foundation also bought WSTP. Both stations were to be used as part of a sports communication program starting in 2014–15. Students would provide local news reporting as well as learning sports coverage. A survey of county residents would be used to determine WSTP's format.

Starting January 1, 1939, WSTP broadcast weekly services from St. John's Lutheran Church. The services had aired for 75 years when WSTP had to leave the air after the March 1, 2015 broadcast (starting March 8, the service would temporarily air an hour late on WSAT). WSTP resumed the services but they moved to WSAT and aired a week late (because of WSAT's commitment to First Baptist) starting September 4, 2016.

The news/talk format was definitely ending because, said Bill Graham, representing the new owners, "I don't want the college associated with a certain political stripe or ideology, and that just simply wouldn't fit." The new format would debut sometime in March after WSTP moved into the WSAT studios. The college was taking over the WSTP studios. On April 1, 2015, WSTP returned to the air with a classic country format, branded as "1490 Carolina Country". A sale of the station to William Marc Graham's 2B Productions, LLC was consummated on May 7, 2015, at a price of $236,000.

WSTP went silent on August 30, 2016, at midnight. The signal was poor and could not be improved. It was the state's 13th oldest radio station. Since August 2016, the station has gone silent from August 31, 2016, to April 12, 2017, and from October 1, 2017, to May 1, 2018.
