= WCSL (AM) =

- Cherryville, North Carolina; United States
- Frequency: 1590 kHz
- Branding: Carolina Country

Programming
- Format: Country
- Affiliations: Atlanta Braves; Carolina Hurricanes; Carolina Panthers; Charlotte Hornets; Motor Racing Network; Performance Racing Network

Ownership
- Owner: Calvin Hastings; (KTC Broadcasting, Inc.)

History
- First air date: 1967

Technical information
- Licensing authority: FCC
- Facility ID: 35656
- Class: D
- Power: 10,000 watts day 30 watts night
- Transmitter coordinates: 35°22′28″N 81°24′23″W
- Translator: 92.9 W225DL (Cherryville)

Links
- Public license information: Public file; LMS
- Website: WCSL Online

WCSL (1590 kHz) is an AM radio station broadcasting a country music format. Licensed to Cherryville, North Carolina, United States, the station is currently owned by Calvin Hastings, through licensee KTC Broadcasting, Inc.

The station is an affiliate of the Atlanta Braves radio network, the largest radio affiliate network in Major League Baseball. The station also carries NASCAR through the Motor Racing Network and Performance Racing Network. Also broadcasts Carolina Panthers, Charlotte Hornets, North Carolina Tarheel basketball and football and the ACC/NCAA basketball tournament.

== History ==
Don Curtis started WCSL in 1967. In 1983, Calvin Hastings bought WCSL and doubled its power from 500 to 1000 watts. Six years later, he bought WGNC in Gastonia and started KTC Broadcasting. In 1992 he bought WOHS (730 AM) in Shelby and began calling the three stations Piedmont Superstations.

WCSL, WGNC and WOHS began airing Atlanta Braves baseball in 1993.

On April 1, 1993, KTC took over WLON in Lincolnton in a lease agreement. WLON's Tim Biggerstaff remained as morning DJ, and his show would be heard on all four KTC stations. News for the entire area was expanded. The four stations aired UNC football and basketball, Dallas Cowboys and Washington Redskins NFL football, and CBS coverage of such events as the World Series and the Super Bowl.

The four stations added the NFL Carolina Panthers when the team began playing in 1995. They also aired games of the NBA Charlotte Hornets In 2000, the stations began airing the Redskins again instead of the Panthers (WGNC aired the Panthers if there was no conflict).

Former logo

Late in 1999, the four stations changed from country music to "super oldies." Biggerstaff, the program director, said country had moved away from its traditional sound. Lillie White remained as midday host, and Andy Foster was afternoon host. Local and sports remained important, and the stations aired the One-on-One sports radio network at night.

In 2004, Biggerstaff was still hosting his show on WCSL and WLON despite diabetes-related health problems. Later he moved to Lincolnton-based Hometown Radio's Shelby operation. On WADA he played classic country music, and he hosted a "Swap Shop" show on WGNC and WOHS. By this time he had experienced a kidney transplant and two pancreas transplants.

WCSL played Southern gospel but now airs a COUNTRY format.

Previous logo

Effective December 1, 2014, Calvin Hastings repurchased WCSL and WLON from HRN Broadcasting for $240,000, through his licensee KTC Broadcasting, Inc.
