= WGFY =

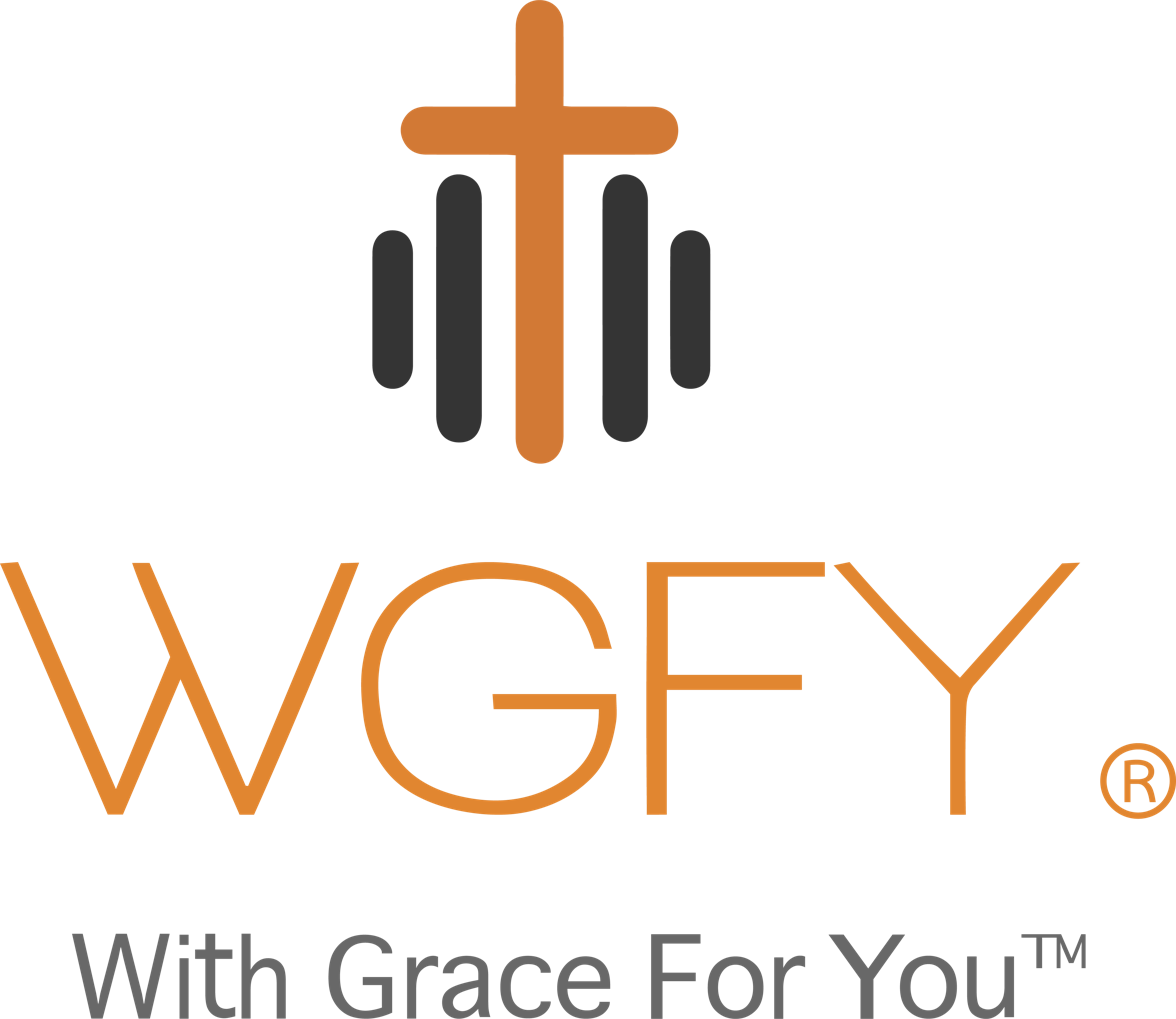
- Charlotte, North Carolina; United States
- Frequency: 1480 kHz
- Branding: Faith 1480

Programming
- Format: Christian radio
- Affiliations: 3ABN Radio

Ownership
- Owner: Charlotte Advent Media Corporation

History
- First air date: January 18, 1955
- Former call signs: WWOK (1954–1969); WAME (1969–1990); WCNT (1990–1993); WCNV (1993–1994); WIST (1994–1996); WNMX (1996–1997); WTLT (1997–1998)
- Call sign meaning: Goofy, from former Radio Disney affiliation

Technical information
- Licensing authority: FCC
- Facility ID: 10889
- Class: B
- Power: 12,000 watts (day); 5,000 watts (night)
- Transmitter coordinates: 35°17′05″N 80°52′34″W

Links
- Public license information: Public file; LMS
- Webcast: Listen live
- Website: wgfyradio.com

WGFY (1480 AM) is a commercial radio station in Charlotte, North Carolina, United States. The station is owned by the Charlotte Advent Media Corporation and it broadcasts a Christian format as an affiliate of LifeTalk Radio.

On May 25, 2016, WGFY was granted a Federal Communications Commission construction permit to increase daytime power to 12,000 watts.

== History ==
On January 18, 1955, the station signed on with the call sign WWOK. Initially a daytime only operation with 1,000 watts, the station added a directional antenna system and nighttime operation in the late 1950s. The station was Charlotte's Mutual Broadcasting System affiliate, and played middle of the road music.

On March 27, 1964, Blackburn and Co. reported the sale of WWOK by Tarlow Associates of Boston to WWOK Inc. for $400,000. No changes were planned according to general manager Herb Berg. At the time, the station was located at 215 Greystone Road. In early 1965 Wells H. Barnette replaced Berg, who was promoted to commercial manager, and WWOK began operating 24 hours a day.

On August 30, 1965, WWOK switched from "good" music to country music. In 1969, the station was purchased by Mission Broadcasting of San Antonio, Texas, an early ancestor of Clear Channel Communications. Around this same time, Mission also purchased Miami R&B station WAME ("The Whammy in Miami"). The company flipped the call letters on its two acquisitions, sending WWOK to Florida and bringing WAME to Charlotte.

WAME was part of a "new breed" of country and western stations "presenting it in a more sophisticated manner". The style of "Easy Ed" Robinson, for example, was more like that of big-city stations playing easy listening, described as "polished, metropolitan". One reason was that he was from New York City, not the South. In addition to the afternoon shift, he recorded commercials and reviewed music. Morning host T. Tommy Stone portrayed different characters during the week, including cleaning lady Mrs. Wheately, seven-year-old Martha Godfrey and Andy Sweet with the pigeon report. He just played music on Saturdays. Other popular DJs in WAME's country music days included Ed Galloway, "Large" Larry English, Bill Alexander, John Sutton and Bob Brandon. On June 18, 1973, Bob Quay of WWVA (AM) became the new morning host, replacing Robinson, who moved to afternoons and also served as program manager, while Rich Jones returned to evenings and John Lyon returned to Charlotte from WWOK to do the overnight slot. The phrases "Whammy" and "Top Dog in Charlotte Country" were used extensively to promote the station in those days.

As WAME, the station was responsible for one of the first radio controversies in Charlotte, when the station's billboards showed a woman in tight jeans (and little else) having the WAME logo branded on her posterior.

WAME became Charlotte's second full-time Christian radio station at 11 P.M. December 31, 1978 after Jimmy Swaggart's Sonlife Broadcasting bought the station. The format was mostly Contemporary Christian Music such as B.J. Thomas, Dave Boyer and Evie Tornquist. Jeff Flanders, an official for Swaggart, called it "a blend of music that would not offend anyone", and he said the objective was to get listeners who would not otherwise listen to Christian music. Galloway moved to WIST despite a noncompete clause. In early 1980, Swaggart denounced Contemporary Christian Music through his publication The Evangelist, and WAME changed to "teaching programs and middle-of-the-road, family-oriented music." By 1980 half the programming was "spoken word". Popular DJs in WAME's Christian days were Danny Dyer, Teresa Gardner and Bob Harris. By 1985, WAME was, (despite the ownership's known objections to CCM) playing Contemporary Christian music again, and continued to do so until 1990. Popular DJ's during the era were Jon Hamilton, Larry Avant, Bill Howard, Dan Edwards, and Rob Truslow.

In March 1990, WAME was sold to a subsidiary of Pat Robertson's Christian Broadcasting Network, which changed the call sign to WCNT and began its own in-house syndicated talk network which included Harley David, Cliff Kincaid and Bob Kwessel. Following the demise of the network shows, WCNT became a primarily local talk radio station. Gerry Vaillancourt started his talk show on WCNT, and H. A. Thompson did a daily show on the station for several months.

During 1991, on Saturday and Sunday evenings, WCNT aired When Radio Was, hosted by Art Fleming, with radio serials such as The Shadow and Fibber McGee and Molly.

Late in 1991, WCNT began airing mostly sports talk. However, the station was never able to make a profit, with CBN taking the station dark at 9 AM on November 6, 1991, and searched for a buyer.

Early in 1993, new owners, the Christ Covenant Church of Matthews, North Carolina, returned the station to the air as WCNV ("Charlotte's News Voice"), airing the audio portion of CNN's Headline News Channel 24 hours a day. As with its previous format, unprofitability and expenses forced the station silent by year's end.

In 1994, the owners of WHVN took over the station's operations under a local marketing agreement with Christ Covenant, and brought the station back on air as WIST with an adult standards format utilizing the "Stardust" format from Satellite Music Networks (later part of ABC Radio Networks). (The WIST callsign had been used in Charlotte from 1947 to 1983, last residing on what is now WHVN.) Talk shows and some sports programming were eventually added to the AM station after WIST added an FM frequency in 1995. John Sullivan was the most notable of the local hosts. Both the AM and FM stations began using the WNMX call sign in 1996.

In July 1997, WNMX, the current WAME in Statesville, and WAVO in Rock Hill, South Carolina formed the "Total Radio Network". WNMX became WTLT, and WAME became WTLI. The stations aired local and syndicated talk shows as well as news. But the format did not work, and WTLT returned to playing adult standards in November, starting with Christmas music during the holidays, while continuing to air syndicated hosts until their contracts ended. WTLT simulcast the Christian programming of WHVN beginning in May 1998, before Disney bought it and adopted the children's/contemporary hit radio format of "Radio Disney" on September 1, and changed its callsign to the current WGFY call sign that stood for Disney character Goofy on September 4.

On August 13, 2014, Disney put WGFY and twenty-two other Radio Disney stations up for sale, to focus on digital distribution of the Radio Disney network. On January 26, 2015, Radio Disney Group filed to sell WGFY to the Charlotte Advent Media Corporation. Charlotte Advent Media bought the station for $600,000. The sale was consummated on May 5. On the same day, WGFY dropped the Radio Disney programming and went silent. The station resumed operations on June 9. It is an affiliate of the Seventh-Day Adventist-aligned Christian radio network LifeTalk Radio.
