= WGSP-FM =

Radio station in Pageland, South Carolina (Charlotte, North Carolina)

- Pageland, South Carolina; United States
- Broadcast area: Charlotte, North Carolina
- Frequency: 102.3 MHz
- Branding: Kaliente 102.3 y 107.5

Programming
- Format: Spanish tropical

Ownership
- Owner: Norsan Media; (Norsan Media Group of South Carolina, LLC)
- Sister stations: WGSP (AM), WXNC WOLS, WNOW

History
- First air date: 1975; 51 years ago
- Former call signs: WCPL-FM (1975–1989); WMAP-FM (1989–1999); WRML (1999–2007)
- Call sign meaning: Greenville-SPartanburg or Great Sounds of the Past, which was taken from sister station WGSP

Technical information
- Licensing authority: FCC
- Facility ID: 57452
- Class: A
- ERP: 2,550 watts
- HAAT: 156 meters (512 feet)
- Repeater: 1310 WGSP (Charlotte)

Links
- Public license information: Public file; LMS
- Webcast: Listen live
- Website: kalienteclt.com

WGSP-FM (102.3 MHz) is a radio station licensed to the community of Pageland, South Carolina, and serving the greater Charlotte metropolitan area. The station is owned by Norsan Media. It airs a Spanish tropical music format.

== History ==
WCPL-FM was located in Pageland, South Carolina. In 1989, the station became WMAP-FM and began airing the same programming as WMAP in Monroe, North Carolina. After WMAP went off the air, the FM, later known as WRML, played Southern gospel music. In 2006, Norsan took over the station and made plans to move the transmitter closer to the metropolitan area. The programming was also aired on WXNC, at 1060 AM and WGSP, at 1310 AM. Charlotte listeners began receiving the stronger signal in September 2007.

The station was assigned the WGSP-FM call letters by the Federal Communications Commission on September 26, 2007.

On January 1, 2009, "La Raza" began airing on WOLS, which Norsan Media began leasing, and WGSP-FM simulcast WOLS for a short time before a switch to tropical music / Latin pop format.

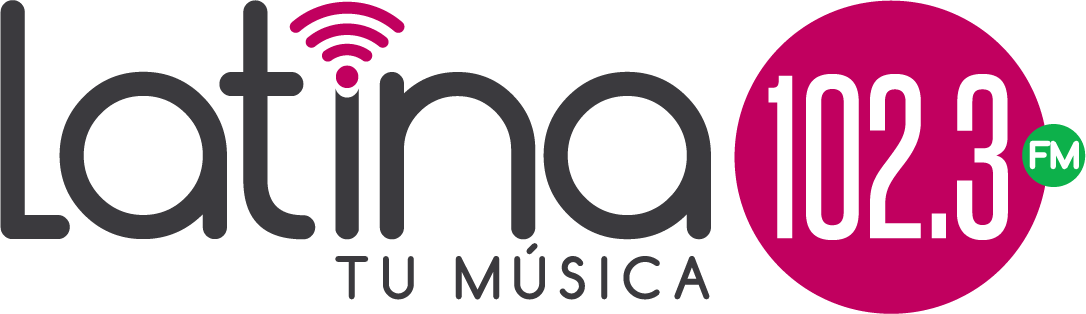
Logo before WGSP simulcast

Starting in 2013, WGSP-FM was called "Latina 102.3".

On May 29, 2025, WGSP-FM and WGSP rebranded as "Kaliente 102.3 & 107.5".
