= WGSP (AM) =

Simulcasts WGSP-FM Pageland, South Carolina
- Charlotte, North Carolina; United States
- Broadcast area: Charlotte metropolitan area
- Frequency: 1310 kHz
- Branding: Kaliente 102.3 y 107.5

Programming
- Format: Spanish tropical

Ownership
- Owner: Norsan Media; (Norsan Media Group of South Carolina, LLC)
- Sister stations: WGSP-FM, WXNC, WNOW, WOLS

History
- First air date: August 23, 1958 (68 years ago)
- Call sign meaning: "Great Sounds of the Past" (from former format)

Technical information
- Licensing authority: FCC
- Facility ID: 10631
- Class: D
- Power: 5,000 watts day 240 watts night
- Transmitter coordinates: 35°15′23″N 80°51′52″W
- Translator: 107.5 W298CF (Charlotte)

Links
- Public license information: Public file; LMS
- Webcast: Listen Live
- Website: kalienteclt.com

WGSP (1310 kHz) is a commercial AM radio station in Charlotte, North Carolina, known as Kaliente 102.3 y 107.5. It is owned by Norsan Media and broadcasts a Spanish tropical radio format. Programming is trimulcast on WGSP-FM 102.3 MHz and FM translator W298CF at 107.5 MHz.

By day, WGSP is powered at 5,000 watts non-directional. But to protect other stations on 1310 AM, it greatly reduces power at night to 240 watts and switches to a directional antenna. The radio studios are on East Independence Boulevard in Charlotte. The transmitter is off Bellaire Drive, near West Brookshire Freeway (North Carolina Highway 16) in Charlotte.

== FM Translator ==
In addition to the main station on 1310 kHz, WGSP programming is relayed to an FM translator.

Broadcast translator for WGSP (AM)
Call sign	Frequency	City of license	FID	ERP (W)	Class	FCC info
W298CF	107.5 FM	Charlotte, North Carolina	157114	250	D	LMS

== History ==
On August 23, 1958, the station signed on as WKTC as a country music station. It was a daytimer station, required to go off the air at night. WKTC disc jockey Johnny Jacobs demonstrated that a person could live in a fallout shelter for a long period of time (which people during the Cold War feared they would have to do), spending a week there and contacting the station by phone.

WKTC became Charlotte's first full-time Christian radio station in September 1970, with gospel music and "contemporary inspirational singing" as well as syndicated religious programming and news. Response was very positive. Program director Bill Hicks said a "Top 40" style format was being considered. Around the same time, George H. Buck Jr. bought the station, which became WHVN. As of 1980, about 65 percent of programming was "spoken word". When the 1240 frequency became available early in the 80s, allowing 24-hour broadcasts, WHVN moved from 1310, which only allowed a daytime signal.

WGSP ("Great Sounds of the Past") returned to the air as one of Charlotte's first oldies stations, playing a wide variety of standard pop hits and "beach music." In 1985, with no other area stations playing classic rock this small AM station became one of the first in the country to shape a format around vintage rock and roll from the 1960s and 1970s. WGSP became the second most listened to AM station in the market. At its peak, the WGSP air staff included Program Director Paul Ingles, Rick Ballew, Fielding Spicer, David Appleford, Phil England and Darby James. After a couple of years of growth by WGSP, other FM stations in the region adopted the "Classic Rock" format and, with their better signals, WGSP lost audience and was sold to religious broadcasters.

WGSP became a gospel station and this format continued until 2004, when the switch was made to the current format. During 2006 and 2007, WGSP's programming aired on WGSP-FM, at 102.3 FM. Programs included "La Voz del Immigrante" ("The Voice of the Immigrant"). WGSP has simulcast the La Tremenda Network with WXNC.

former logo
