= WFGW =

Contemporary Christian radio station in Norris-Knoxville, Tennessee

Semi-satellite of WMIT, Black Mountain, North Carolina
- Norris, Tennessee; United States
- Broadcast area: Knoxville, Tennessee
- Frequency: 106.7 MHz
- Branding: The Light

Programming
- Format: Contemporary Christian

Ownership
- Owner: Billy Graham Evangelistic Association; (Blue Ridge Broadcasting Company)

History
- Former call signs: WBEH (1998–1999); WXVO (1999–2001); WRMX-FM (2001–2005); WRJK (2005–2012); WFGW-FM (2012); WLYT (2012–2013)

Technical information
- Licensing authority: FCC
- Facility ID: 76263
- Class: A
- ERP: 1,100 watts
- HAAT: 229 meters (751 ft)
- Transmitter coordinates: 36°7′12.00″N 83°55′30.00″W

Links
- Public license information: Public file; LMS
- Webcast: Listen Live
- Website: 1067thelight.org

WFGW (106.7 FM) is a radio station broadcasting a Contemporary Christian music format to Knoxville, Tennessee and the surrounding area. It is a sister station and semi-satellite of WMIT in Black Mountain, North Carolina. Licensed to Norris, Tennessee, the station is a noncommercial, listener supported ministry of the Billy Graham Evangelistic Association.

The Billy Graham Evangelistic Association agreed in 2012 to lease the-then WRJK from South Central Communications, the first acquisition by the company since WMIT in 1963. Prior to 2012, WRJK simulcast WQJK "Jack FM", an adult hits station with the slogan "Playing what we want". The WMIT simulcast began February 8, 2012. At that time, the call letters changed to WLYT.

Later in 2012, WLYT was acquired outright by the Billy Graham Evangelistic Association through its licensee, Blue Ridge Broadcasting, and the call letters were then changed to WFGW.

WFGW simulcasts WMIT for most of the day. However, it airs separate morning and midday shows, and its Sunday schedule is slightly different as well. Combined, the two stations provide at least secondary coverage from Knoxville to Charlotte, North Carolina.
