= Pancreas transplantation =

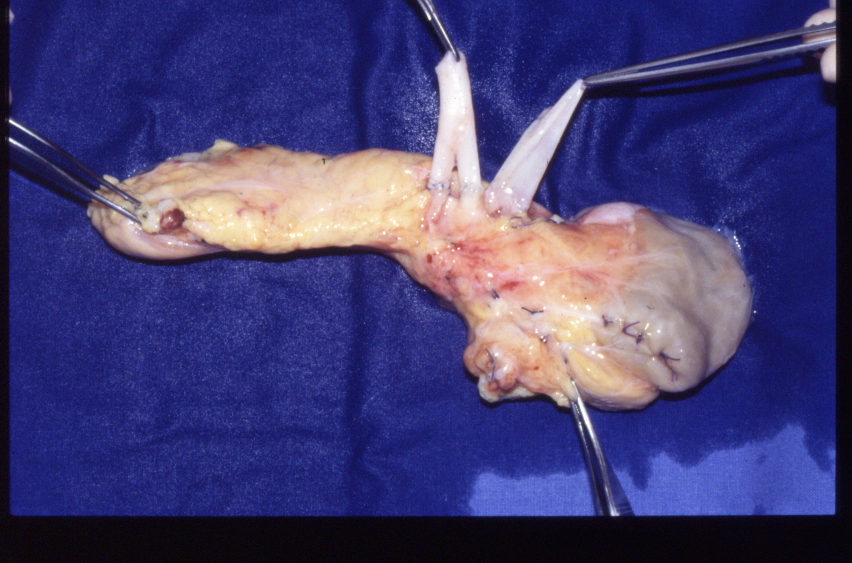
- Pancreas transplant ex-situ prepared with reconstruction of arteries and lengthening of the portal vein
- ICD-9-CM: 52.8
- MeSH: D016035
- MedlinePlus: 003007

A pancreas transplant is an organ transplant that involves implanting a healthy pancreas (one that can produce insulin) into a person who usually has diabetes.

== Overview ==
Because the pancreas is a vital organ, performing functions necessary in the digestion process, the recipient's native pancreas is left in place, and the donated pancreas is attached in a different location. In the event of rejection of the new pancreas, which would quickly cause life-threatening diabetes, there would be a significant chance the recipient would not survive very well for long without the native pancreas, however dysfunctional, still in place. The healthy pancreas comes from a donor who has just died or it may be a partial pancreas from a living donor. At present, pancreas transplants are usually performed in persons with insulin-dependent diabetes, who can develop severe complications. Patients with the most common, and deadliest, form of pancreatic cancer (pancreatic adenomas, which are usually malignant, with a poor prognosis and high risk for metastasis, as opposed to more treatable pancreatic neuroendocrine tumors or pancreatic insulinomas) are usually not eligible for valuable pancreatic transplantations, since the condition usually has a very high mortality rate and the disease, which is usually highly malignant and detected too late to treat, could and probably would soon return. Better surgical method can be chosen to minimize the surgical complications with enteric or bladder drainage. Advancement in immunosuppression has improved quality of life after transplantation.

== Medical uses ==
In most cases, pancreas transplantation is performed on people with type 1 diabetes with end-stage renal disease, brittle diabetes, and hypoglycaemic unawareness. Other type 2 diabetics can benefit from a pancreas transplant. The indications for a type 2 diabetic are a BMI < 30 kg/m2 and low overall insulin requirement (< 1 U/kg/day). The majority of pancreas transplantations (> 90%) are simultaneous pancreas-kidney transplantations.

== Complications ==
Complications immediately after surgery include clotting of the arteries or veins of the new pancreas (thrombosis), inflammation of the pancreas (pancreatitis), infection, bleeding and rejection. Rejection may occur immediately or at any time during the patient's life. This is because the transplanted pancreas comes from another organism, thus the recipient's immune system will consider it as an aggression and try to combat it. Organ rejection is a serious condition and must be treated immediately. In order to prevent it, patients must take a regimen of immunosuppressive drugs. Drugs are taken in combination consisting normally of ciclosporin, azathioprine and corticosteroids. But as episodes of rejection may reoccur throughout a patient's life, the exact choices and dosages of immunosuppressants may have to be modified over time. Sometimes tacrolimus is given instead of ciclosporin and mycophenolate mofetil instead of azathioprine.

== Types ==
There are four main types of pancreas transplantation:

- Pancreas transplant alone, for the patient with type 1 diabetes who usually has severe, frequent hypoglycemia, but adequate kidney function. This pancreas transplant known as PTA has as of recently been showing up with good results. This is the least performed method of pancreas transplantation and requires that only the pancreas of a donor is given to the recipient.
- Simultaneous pancreas-kidney transplant (SPK), when the pancreas and kidney are transplanted simultaneously from the same deceased donor. This is the most commonly performed pancreas transplant operation. Indications for an SPK are End Stage Renal Disease with type 1 diabetes (with other diabetic complications like neuropathy, gastroparesis etc.) This is the most common type of pancreas transplantation. The basic reason for this is that patients are mostly already on immunosuppressive drugs and the addition of the kidneys simultaneously reduces the risk in surgical procedure.
- Pancreas-after-kidney transplant (PAK), when a cadaveric, or deceased, donor pancreas transplant is performed after a previous, and different, living or deceased donor kidney transplant. This method is usually recommended for diabetic patients after having a successful kidney transplant. The downside of this procedure is that patients are required to go through surgical risk twice.
- Simultaneous deceased donor pancreas and live donor kidney (SPLK) has the benefit of lower rate of delayed graft function than SPK and significantly reduced waiting times, resulting in improved outcomes.

== Prognosis ==
The prognosis after pancreas transplantation is very good. Over the recent years, long-term success has improved and risks have decreased. One year after transplantation more than 95% of all patients are still alive and 80–85% of all pancreases are still functional. After transplantation patients need lifelong immunosuppression. Immunosuppression increases the risk for a number of different kinds of infection and cancer.

It is unclear if steroids, which are often used as immunosuppressant, can be replaced with something else.

== History ==
As described by a pioneer in the field, D.E. Sutherland, whole pancreas transplantation began as a part of multi-organ transplants, in the mid-to-late 1960s, at the University of Minnesota:

The first attempt to cure type 1 diabetes by pancreas transplantation was done at the University of Minnesota, in Minneapolis, on December 17, 1966… [This] opened the door to a period, between the mid 70's to mid 80's where only segmental pancreatic grafts were used... In the late 70's-early 80's, three major events… boosted the development of pancreas transplantation… [At] the Spitzingsee meetings, participants had the idea to renew the urinary drainage technique of the exocrine secretion of the pancreatic graft with segmental graft and eventually with whole pancreaticoduodenal transplant. That was clinically achieved during the mid 80's and remained the mainstay technique during the next decade. In parallel, the Swedish group developed the whole pancreas transplantation technique with enteric diversion. It was the onset of the whole pancreas reign. The enthusiasm for the technique was rather moderated in its early phase due to the rapid development of liver transplantation and the need for sharing vascular structures between both organs, liver and pancreas. During the modern era of immunosuppression, the whole pancreas transplantation technique with enteric diversion became the gold standard…

The first pancreas transplantation, performed in a multi-organ transplant with kidney and duodenum, was into a 28-year-old woman; her death three month post-surgery did not obscure the apparent success of the pancreatic replacement. It was performed in 1966 by the team of W.D. Kelly, R.C. Lillehei, F.K. Merkel, Y. Idezuki, F.C. Goetz and coworkers at the University Hospitals, University of Minnesota, three years after the first kidney transplantation.

In the successive 1980s period, there was significant improvements in immunosuppressive drugs, surgical techniques, and the preservation of organs. The prognosis is very good with 95% of patients still alive after one year post-surgery and 80-85% of all pancreases still functional.
