= Mass media in Charlotte, North Carolina =

Charlotte, North Carolina is a U.S. city that serves as a hub for numerous media sources.

== Television ==
The Charlotte television market is the 21st largest TV market in the United States, and the largest in North Carolina, according to Nielsen Media Research. Charlotte is the Largest Market In The United States Where The Big 6 is not Owned & Operated.

=== Local television stations ===
Network owned-and-operated stations are highlighted in bold.

Channel	Callsign	Affiliation	Subchannels		Owner
Channel	Callsign	Affiliation	Channel	Programming	Owner
3	WBTV	CBS	3.2; 3.3; 3.4; 3.5	Bounce TV; 365BLK; Defy TV; Oxygen	Gray Television
9	WSOC-TV	ABC	9.2; 9.3; 9.4	Telemundo; Get; Comet	Cox Media Group
14	**WWJS**	Sonlife	14.2; 14.3; 14.4; 14.5; 14.6; 14.7	Newsmax2; Comet; Busted; MovieSphere Gold; Infomercials; Roar	Family Worship Center Church, Inc.
16	WCEE-LD	Estrella TV	16.2; 16.3	Quiero TV; Quiero Music	Norsan Broadcasting
18	WCCB	Independent	18.2; 18.3; 18.4; 18.5; 18.6; 18.7; 18.8; 18.9	Start TV; MeTV; QVC; H&I; Dabl; HSN; Cozi TV; MeTV Toons	Bahakel Communications
21	W15EB-D	Visión Latina	21.2; 21.3; 21.4; 21.5; 21.6; 21.7	ULFN; LX; TeleXitos; NTD America; Law & Crime; SonLife	Innovate Corp.
28	WGTB-CD	The Walk TV	-	-	Victory Christian Center
30	WNSC-TV	PBS/SCETV	30.2; 30.3	SC Channel (Create/PBS Encore); ETV World; SCETV PBS Kids	South Carolina Educational Television Commission
36	WCNC-TV	NBC	36.2; 36.3; 36.4; 36.5	True Crime Network; Court TV; Quest; The Nest	Tegna, Inc.
40	WVEB-LD	Timeless TV	40.2; 40.3; 40.4; 40.5; 40.6; 40.7	Magnificent Movies Network; Stadium; CRTV; Shop LC; Binge TV; Carz and Trax	DTV America
41	WHEH-LD	Novelísima	41.2; 41.3; 41.4; 41.5; 41.6; 41.7	LX; TeleXitos; Buzzr beIN Sports Xtra beIN Sports Xtra en Español; Carz and Trax	DTV America
42	WTVI	PBS	-	-	Central Piedmont Community College
46	WJZY	Fox	46.3; 46.4; 46.5; 46.6; 46.7; 46.8	Charge! Grit; Shop LC; Ion Television; Antenna TV; Rewind TV/MyNetworkTV	Nexstar Media Group
55	**WMYT-TV**	The CW	-	-	Nexstar Media Group
58	WUNG-TV	PBS/UNC-TV	58.2; 58.3; 58.4	UNC Kids; UNC Explorer; The North Carolina Channel	University of North Carolina
64	WAXN-TV	Independent	64.2; 64.3	Laff; Ion Mystery	Cox Media Group

=== National cable channels ===
- ESPNU/SEC Network
- Fox Sports 1 formerly SPEED

Charlotte was also the former home of the Inspiration Network (INSP), which is now in Indian Land, South Carolina.

=== Local cable channels ===
- Bally Sports South
- Spectrum News 1 North Carolina

== Radio ==
The Charlotte radio market is the 24th largest in the U.S., according to Arbitron. Broadcast radio stations serving the market include, in order of format:

- Adult Contemporary
  - WKQC 104.7 FM
- Adult Standards
- Americana
  - WNCW 101.3 FM
- Classical
  - WDAV 89.9 FM
- Country
  - WIXE 1190 AM
  - WKKT 96.9 FM
  - WRHM-FM 107.1 FM
  - WSOC-FM 103.7 FM
- News/Talk/Sports
  - WBT-FM 107.9 FM
  - WFAE 90.7 FM (NPR news)
  - WFNZ-FM 92.7 FM (sports)
  - WHKY 1290 AM (talk)
  - WNSC-FM 88.9 (news, broadcasts from Rock Hill, South Carolina)
  - WRHI 1340 AM and 94.3 FM (news)
  - WTCG 870 AM (simulcast from 1370 AM in Clayton, Georgia)
  - WZGV 730 AM (ESPN sports)
- Oldies
  - WRBK-FM 90.3 FM
- Public Radio
  - WSGE 91.7 FM
- Religious
  - WAVO 1150 AM (contemporary Christian)
  - WHVN 1240 AM (Spanish language)
  - WCGC 1270 AM (Catholic)
  - WDEX 1430 AM (Southern gospel)
  - WGFY 1480 AM (LifeTalk Radio)
  - WMIT 106.9 FM (contemporary Christian)
  - WNLV 95.1 FM ("K-Love" contemporary Christian)
  - WOGR 1540 AM (Christian)
  - WRCM-FM 91.9 FM ("K-Love" contemporary Christian)
  - WWLV 94.1 FM ("K-Love" contemporary Christian broadcasts from the Piedmont Triad)
  - WYFQ 100.9 FM and 930 AM (Bible Broadcasting Network)
  - WCRU 960 AM
- Rock
  - WXRC 95.7 FM (rock-leaning classic hits)
  - WRFX 99.7 FM (classic rock)
  - WLKO 102.9 FM (adult hits)
  - WEND 106.5 FM (modern rock)
- Spanish
  - WNOW 1030 AM
  - WOLS 106.1 FM (regional Mexican)
  - WXNC 1060 AM
  - WGSP 1310 AM
  - WGSP-FM 102.3 FM (Tropical and Latin Pop)
- Top 40/Pop
  - WHQC 96.1 FM
- Urban
  - WPZS 610 AM (Urban Gospel)
  - WPEG 97.9 FM (Mainstream Urban)
  - WBAV-FM 101.9 FM (Urban Adult Contemporary)
  - WOSF 105.3 FM (Urban Oldies)
  - WGIV 1370 AM/103.3 FM (Urban Variety)
- Variety
  - WYLI-LP 93.7 FM

== See also ==
- North Carolina media
  - List of newspapers in North Carolina
  - List of radio stations in North Carolina
  - List of television stations in North Carolina
  - Media of cities in North Carolina: Asheville, Durham, Fayetteville, Greensboro, High Point, Raleigh, Wilmington, Winston-Salem
