= Jack Daniel (DJ) =

American radio DJ

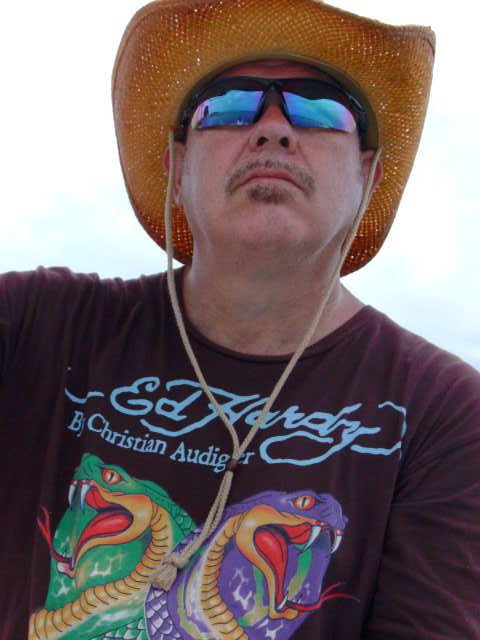

Jack Daniel (real name Shane Atwell) is a DJ and radio professional who has worked in Charlotte, North Carolina radio since the mid-1970s.

== Career ==
While Shane Atwell was a student at Concord High School in Concord, North Carolina, he worked at the student radio station WCHS. As a computer science major at East Carolina University, he devoted much of his time to working at the campus radio station WECU, and he dropped out in 1975. A year later, he went to work at WPEG, a Top 40 station in Concord that switched to disco in 1977. When the disco craze ended and WPEG changed to soul music, Atwell moved to WROQ. Jim Ballard, WROQ program director, decided Atwell needed a better name since people knew him from disco, and when he heard someone order Jack Daniel's and Coke, he told Atwell his name would be Jack Daniel. After his first shift as Jack Daniel, bikers loved the name and even brought him a bottle of Jack Daniel's.

When WROQ was an album rock station, Daniel served as program director. Later he became a morning host at CHR WJZR "Z-100". In 1986, Daniel became midday announcer at CHR/adult contemporary WBCY. At that time, he was also host of the TV series "Let's Dance" on WPCQ. Later that year, he was also WBCY program director. During his time at WBCY, the station made a significant ratings improvement after finally selecting a successful morning team—Randy Cook and Spiff Dingle—and increasing its focus on CHR music.

In September 1987, Daniel became program director on the station he had left in 1986, which by this time was album rock WRFX. At this time, he had been a part of Charlotte-area radio more than 12 years. By 1990, Daniel was the station's general manager. Daniel prevented popular morning hosts John Boy and Billy from leaving the station by making a deal that paid them well and gave them the chance to be syndicated.

When WRFX owner Pyramid Broadcasting purchased struggling CHR WAQQ (which used to be WROQ) and sports talk WAQS, Daniel became general manager of those stations.

WAQQ became WEDJ in 1994 and Daniel became its general manager, but by November of that year, the station's 10-month-old format was not succeeding quickly enough for Pyramid. Daniel admitted he had never tried starting a new station and it was more difficult than he thought. He left radio because of a noncompete clause.

Daniel became director of sales and marketing for Paradox Films, which produced ads for WBTV, The Nashville Network and Charlotte Motor Speedway. But he did not stay away from radio for long. In April 1995, he became program director and afternoon host on modern rock WEND. In 1996, Daniel was nominated for Program Director of the Year by the Billboard & Airplay Monitor Awards.

In 1999, Daniel became operations manager of WEND and oldies WWMG "Magic 96.1", remaining program director for WEND.

Daniel also plays in a band called Route 66.

In 2000, Clear Channel Radio (now iHeartRadio) purchased WEND/WWMG and moved the operation to join their other Charlotte stations, WRFX, WLYT, and WKKT.

In 2011, Daniel became syndicated on iHeartRadio. He can be heard each weekday morning on "Big Classic Hits", a channel that plays the hits of the 1970s and 1980s. In addition to being available via iHeartRadio, the show is offered on terrestrial stations in over 50 markets nationwide.

After 22 years with WEND, Daniel also programmed WLKO, also an iHeartRadio station.

In August 2017, Chuck "DZL" Thompson replaced Daniel at WEND, becoming that station's second program director in 22 years. Daniel also lost his WLKO job.

As of 2023 Daniel was program director and midday DJ on WKQC, where he began working in 2018, and program director of W234BY. Daniel will retire on September 18, 2026, exactly 54 years after his radio career began.

Daniel has also been heard on national and regional advertising campaigns for Arby's, AEG Concerts and in the mid-1990s, Auto Zone.

== Personal life ==
Daniel has two grown children, Adam, a teacher at Mitchell College and daughter Alexandra Lane, a social worker in Raleigh. Adam has twin boys, Arlo & Anderson and Alexandra has one son, Ezra. His wife Carla is a retired speech pathologist. In March 2018, Jack Daniel launched his new website for his voiceover business.
