= WGIV (1600 AM) =

Radio station in Charlotte, North Carolina, United States (1947–2003)

- Charlotte, North Carolina; United States
- Broadcast area: Charlotte metropolitan area
- Frequency: 1600 kHz

History
- First air date: December 13, 1947
- Last air date: November 30, 2003
- Former call signs: WGIV (1947–1994); WBAV (1994–1997)

Technical information
- Facility ID: 6585
- Class: B
- Power: 1,000 watts
- Transmitter coordinates: 35°14′57.5″N 80°51′40.3″W

WGIV (1600 kHz) was a commercial AM radio station, licensed to Charlotte, North Carolina, and serving the Charlotte metropolitan area. It was the first station in the Charlotte radio market to target the African-American audience full time. WGIV operated from 1947 to 2003, when it was closed in deference to a new expanded band station, WFNA (1660 AM).

== History ==
In September 1946, the Publix Broadcasting Service of Charlotte, Inc., owned by Francis Marion Fitzgerald, a progressive White man, made a request to the Federal Communications Commission (FCC) to open a general radio station. The application was denied on grounds that a number of stations covering general topics were already in place in Charlotte, North Carolina. Fitzgerald exploited this fact to propose the concept of a radio devoted to the Charlotte's black community, an unprecedented and bold idea. The major reason he chose this format was because there was no prior radio focused on the African American market, which made it a financial opportunity.

The proposal was accepted, and on December 13, 1947, WGIV signed on the air. The African American voice needed to be heard, and it constituted a neglected sector of the radio market that was waiting to be exploited. The fact that the FCC resonated well with these two factors worked well for WGIV, which periodically sought the FCC for help with facilities and other FCC approved things. A Bachelor of Science from Furman University, Fitzgerald served as a communications officer in the United States Naval Reserve. After World War II, he became general manager at WORD in Spartanburg, and soon after joined hands with two other radio veterans to form the Publix Broadcasting Service of Charlotte, Inc. His family had stayed in Charlotte through all his careers, and he had decided that he wanted to be with them, and start a station in Charlotte.

The WGIV call letters unofficially stood for "We are GI Veterans", in reference to the then-completed war.

Popular DJs of the station in the 1950s and 1960s included "Genial Gene" Potts, Chattie Hattie and "Rockin' Ray" Gooding.

In the 1960s, WBT and WGIV were often paired as the driving force from Charlotte editorializing on the race issue that had become prevalent in the area. WGIV, however, came through in history as an exceptional merger of Black and White culture in its region – it chose to integrate differences where others chose to isolate them. This integration was represented in one of their brand symbols – a white hand shaking a black hand.

WGIV broadcast from 5 a.m. to 1 a.m. and considered itself to be "everybody's station". It had white listeners too. Program director Pete "Hound Dawg" Toomey, "Hot Scott" Hubbs and "Little Joe" Wilson were white DJs. In 1964, WRPL became its first competition and vice president Ray Ervin said, "We wish them the best of luck." WGIV was on Toomey Avenue at the time.

=== Integration over separation ===
As residents of former member of the Confederacy, the people of Charlotte, of all colors, were not alien to racial tension. Fitzgerald's family belonged to Charlotte, and he grew up watching this tension grow in the region. The making of the WGIV was an important part of Charlotte's transition to a non-racist region, and Fitzgerald foresaw this as something that would be greatly appreciated by people. "My father told me years ago if I was ever to make a success of anything, I must find a definite need, fill it, and fill it well", said Fitzgerald twenty years after the debut of WGIV, recalling its inception as an answer to society's dire need of racial integration. WGIV's success was closely linked to Fitzgerald's personality and his own career. Following the booming initial success of WGIV, Fitzgerald became a major stockholder as well as the president of the Charlotte Radio and Television Corporation, which owned WGIV. This enabled Fitzgerald full power over the structure and running of WGIV, and he was indeed free to fulfill his vision of integrating Black and White listeners through his station. Even then, as with any radio, changing the market from being majority White to having a large focus on Blacks was a slow and steady affair. The idea was not to isolate the two markets, but to have them blend into one another, bringing the communities closer to each other's music. The famous "Chattie Hattie" Leeper, one of the Black deejays at WGIV, recalled the true independence deejays had in selecting music to broadcast. She further recalled that the public could not categorize WGIV music as either White or Black. Avoiding racial or generic categorizations, like Fitzgerald's proposal to the FCC, played a dual role for WGIV. It allowed listeners to be exposed to genres easily associated with opposing races, and also ensured that a major portion of White youths in the region continued to make up the WGIV market as its focus slowly shifted to the Black community.

Fitzgerald's concept of integration did not stop there. He made key administrative decisions that gained the Black community's faith as being one of their own representations. At the time, it was uncommon for African Americans to be assigned executive positions as well as other technical or professional positions. Fitzgerald went against this in a number of ways – he put up famous deejays Leeper and Eugene "Genial Gene" Potts high up in the team as Women's Affairs Director and Director of Public Affairs respectively, he assigned a number of other African Americans such positions, and even hired one of the country's first Black radio engineers – Uriah Gooding. The driving idea behind these moves was to give onlookers a sense of the power that African Americans were gaining in the industry. WGIV had become a symbol of the "coming era of racial harmony and progress".

The WGIV deejays, influenced by their boss’ drive for racial equality, largely worked in harmony. Leeper stated in an interview that they "all did everything together, the blacks and whites at the station" and that their office family was so well integrated that the ongoing rage against the Jim Crow segregation laws was "Greek to them". The office collaboration that the deejays had resulted in something extremely stylistic of WGIV, and something that greatly affected the public perception of the radio – both White and Black radio announcers from WGIV had extremely similar styles of presentations, delivery and voice. Thus, "rapper vernaculars" and "sophisticated accents" had begun to sound the same. Leeper stated that deejays sounded polished and spoke with good diction, irrespective of their race, both characteristics not associated with the stereotypical Black vernacularism of the time.

Leeper felt that the Black community had faith in the White leadership in Charlotte. They believed that they would live up to their reputation of being progressive with racial issues. This peaceful collaboration, Leeper felt, was the reason that Blacks did not need to take to the streets in protest, an important aspect of the integration of the two races. In the midst of their struggle to be identified as equal in society by the White counterparts, the African Americans were susceptible to comments and speeches that spoke against them. Therefore, it was important for Whites that were supporting racial integration to publicly accept and show their outright support. Fitzgerald played an integral part in WGIV's role in filling up this identification gap. In July 1953, Fitzgerald was formally recognized by St. Paul's Baptist Church in Charlotte for his "excellent exemplification of unbiased citizenship and high Christian ideals" in his altruistic attempts to integrate African Americans and Whites in the community. Such praise for a White moderate pursuing their progressivism gave confidence to the Black community, and supporting WGIV made complete tactical sense to the Blacks fighting for rights at the time. Fitzgerald and Potts maintained an extremely close friendship and the former never failed to publicly celebrate the latter, also WGIV's star attraction in its prime. Fitzgerald's comments such as "Gene is not only credit to the Negro race – he is credit to a truly great America" became known expressions of white-black cooperation and dialogue.

Beyond tackling the identity issue that the Blacks were facing, Fitzgerald and WGIV gave rise to empowering Charlotte's African American Community in multiple ways. WGIV financed African American businessmen along with the federal SBA (Small Business Administration) to six-week schools over many years, and co-sponsored a Business Management Institute at Carver College in 1957, where Gene served as one of main conveners.

=== Later years and decline ===
In the late 1960s, amidst an atmosphere of rising Black power, many young African Americans in Charlotte became skeptical of WGIV's stated ethos of biracial cooperation. The key issue that brought uproar was Fitzgerald's race. Rising Black youths were angry at the fact that Charlotte's principal Black Radio stations was technically White owned. They spoke of being exploited by this White ownership, and demanded a union that would secure their jobs. The veterans of WGIV, including Leeper, Gene, Fitzgerald himself and others knew that the setting up of such a union would instill mistrust in the staff and completely break the base upon which WGIV had been built. As Leeper felt, the rationale of these uprising youth was not the fault of WGIV. They had not been used to stable jobs, and certainly not used to the idea that a White president would be treating White and Black employees equally.

By 1982, the Suburban Radio Group, owners of urban rival WPEG (97.9 FM), bought WGIV and gradually began moving programming from the AM side to FM. The two would often simulcast, and both would target a diverse African-American audience. For two years ending in 1985, WGIV aired the Class AA Charlotte O's baseball team.

By late 1990, WPEG and WGIV were in a full-time simulcast. In 1991, WGIV flipped to urban gospel; a year later, WGIV flipped to the satellite-fed urban AC service The Touch. In 1993, Broadcast Partners, Inc. (BPI) purchased both stations from Suburban. Later that year, BPI also purchased Gastonia-licensed WCKZ from the Beasley Broadcast Group and launched a current-based urban AC format under the calls WBAV-FM to that frequency in January 1994. WGIV would then change call letters to WBAV on February 11, 1994.

In July 1995, BPI would merge with Evergreen Media. In December 1996, Evergreen would swap WBAV (and their four other stations in the Charlotte market) to EZ Communications, owners of WSOC-FM and WSSS (Evergreen would receive EZ's Philadelphia stations WIOQ and WUSL in return). In May 1997, due to low ratings, WBAV changed formats to urban contemporary gospel and re-adopted the WGIV call letters on May 23. In July of that year, EZ Communications would merge with American Radio Systems (ARS). ARS would then merge with Infinity Broadcasting on September 19, 1997.

=== Expanded band assignment ===
On March 17, 1997, the FCC announced that eighty-eight stations had been given permission to move to newly available "Expanded Band" transmitting frequencies, ranging from 1610 to 1700 kHz, with WGIV authorized to move from 1600 to 1660 kHz.

A construction permit for the expanded band station was assigned the call letters WBHE on September 4, 1998. The FCC's initial policy was that both the original station and its expanded band counterpart could operate simultaneously for up to five years, after which owners would have to turn in one of the two licenses, depending on whether they preferred the new assignment or elected to remain on the original frequency, although this deadline was extended multiple times. However, programming on the expanded band station, which changed its call letters to WFNA on December 9, 2003, rather than supplementing WGIV's programming, was instead paired with a co-owned sports outlet station, WFNZ at 610 AM. Therefore, WGIV's traditional programming orientation was lost when the station went silent, at 11:59 p.m. on November 30, 2003, after nearly 56 years of continuous service. The station's license was formally deleted on June 2, 2004.

On September 16, 2005, in recognition of its historic significance, the former WLTC on 1370 AM in Pineville, North Carolina, changed its call sign to WGIV.

Its expanded band successor on AM 1660, WJBX, permanently signed off on December 31, 2020, and had its license formally deleted on August 24, 2022.
