= WFNZ =

WFNZ may refer to:

- WFNZ-FM, a radio station (92.7 FM) licensed to Harrisburg, North Carolina, United States
- WPZS, a radio station (610 AM) licensed to Charlotte, North Carolina, United States that used the WFNZ call letters from 1995 to 2025
