= Bill Dollar =

William Everett Dollar (August 22, 1950 – November 21, 1996) was a radio host for 16 years on country music station WSOC-FM in Charlotte, North Carolina, a weather reporter on WSOC-TV, and the host of the syndicated program NASCAR Country, carried by over 300 stations at the time of his death. Bill Dollar was the number one DJ in Charlotte for seven years, according to Arbitron. Bill Dollar was involved in several drunk driving collisions, twice injuring two different women in two separate accidents who were hospitalized. He did not seek help for his alcoholism and injured his wife in a collision in which he was intoxicated. Results of an N.C. medical examiner's toxicology report showed Dollar had a blood-alcohol content of 0.24 percent at the time of his fatal crash.

== Early life ==
Dollar was born in Humboldt, Tennessee to Dick, a farmer, and Pauline, an English teacher. When he was a boy he would play with crystal radio sets and homemade transmitters. As a teenager he would hang around a local radio station, and eventually he was given the chance to play records on the air for 90 cents an hour. He also operated the control board for University of Tennessee football broadcasts.

== Professional career ==
Later, Dollar worked at other radio stations, eventually moving up to larger cities such as Memphis, Tennessee and Birmingham, Alabama. He was music director at WGST in Atlanta, Georgia when that station changed to news radio.

In 1979, Dollar applied to the Federal Communications Commission for a frequency allocated to Boone, North Carolina. While waiting for his application to be approved, he moved to Shelbyville, Tennessee and served as morning host and sales manager, but decided he would be better off working for someone else rather than being his own boss. WSOC-FM in Charlotte, North Carolina was advertising for a morning DJ in Broadcasting and Cable Magazine. Dollar applied, but the job went to another applicant.

By 1982, Dollar had surpassed Robert Murphy as the most popular DJ in town, and he held this position for the next seven years. He did this without making fun of The PTL Club, a favorite target of radio DJs in the area, even when the show's scandal became national news.

In October 1989 after three nominations, Dollar received the Broadcast Personality of the Year award (medium markets) from the Country Music Association.

In Fall 1989, Dollar returned to the no. 1 position after John Boy and Billy replaced him in the summer, a ratings period during which the market's top station lost to WPEG.

In August 1994, Dollar had been WSOC's morning host for 14 years, the longest of anyone in Charlotte. But Dollar's ratings with 25-54 listeners were way down, and he returned from vacation, on his 44th birthday, to find he had been moved to middays, replaced in the morning by Paul Schadt and Cindy O'Day. Program director Paul Johnson said the change would attract more younger listeners with "a more contemporary face" and "energy, entertainment and fun." The station tried to claim Dollar asked for the change, but he would not confirm that.

Dollar appeared as an announcer in two movies, Stroker Ace in 1983, and Bandit Goes Country in 1994.

== Death ==
On November 21, 1996, Dollar died as the result of a head-on collision with a pickup truck on N.C. Highway 279 south of Gastonia after he swerved into the pickup's path. Fans left flowers at the station and posted messages on the station's web site. Johnson said, "Bill worked here a long time. The value of the companionship he established with our audience was deep enough so that we wanted to pay respect to what he meant to WSOC and its listeners." General Tom Sadler, executive director of Speedway Children's Charities, called Dollar "one of the great talents in radio and NASCAR." One of the most requested songs was "Rose Colored Glasses" by John Conlee, Dollar's favorite.
