= WFNA =

WFNA may refer to:

- WFNA (TV), a television station (channel 27/PSIP 55) licensed to Gulf Shores, Alabama, United States
- WBCN (North Carolina), a radio station (1660 AM) licensed to Charlotte, North Carolina, United States, which used the call sign WFNA from December 2003 to July 2009
- WANN-CD, a low-power television station (channel 29/PSIP 32) licensed to Atlanta, Georgia, United States, which used the call sign WFNA-LP from June 1999 to June 2002
- White fuming nitric acid
