= WBCN =

WBCN may refer to:

- WBMX, an FM radio station in Boston, Massachusetts, United States, which held the WBCN call sign from 1958 to 2009
- WBCN (North Carolina), a former AM radio station in Charlotte, North Carolina, which held the call sign from 2009 to 2021
- WBCN (Florida), a former AM radio station in North Fort Myers, Florida, which held the call sign from 2021 to 2026
