= WBMX (disambiguation) =

WBMX is a radio station (104.1 FM) licensed to Boston, Massachusetts, United States.

WBMX may also refer to:

- WVAZ, a radio station (102.7 FM) licensed to Oak Park, Illinois, United States, which used the call signs WBMX and WBMX-FM from 1974 to 1988
- WEUR, a radio station (1490 AM) licensed to Oak Park, Illinois, United States, which used the call sign WBMX from 1984 to 1987
- WMFN, a radio station (640 AM) licensed to Zeeland, Michigan, United States, which used the call sign WBMX from 1988 to 1991
- WBZ-FM, a radio station (98.5 FM) licensed to Boston, Massachusetts, United States, which used the call signs WBMX-FM and WBMX from 1991 to 2009
- WBCN (North Carolina), a radio station (1660 AM) licensed to Charlotte, North Carolina, United States, which used the call sign WBMX from July to August 2009
- WSCR-FM, a radio station (104.3 FM) licensed to Chicago, Illinois, United States, which used the call sign WBMX from 2017 to 2026
