= WEAC (disambiguation) =

WEAC may refer to:

- West African Examinations Council, an education accreditation organization
- Wisconsin Education Association Council, a Wisconsin Education Teachers Union located in Madison, Wisconsin
- WEAC-CD, a low-power television station (channel 35, virtual 24) licensed to serve Jacksonville, Alabama, United States
- WZZQ, a radio station in Gaffney, South Carolina, licensed as WEAC until 2009
