= WOSF =

Coordinates: 35.364°N 81.187°W

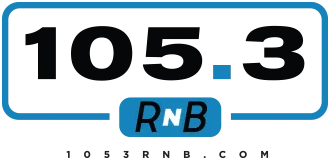
- Gaffney, South Carolina; United States
- Broadcast area: Charlotte, North Carolina
- Frequency: 105.3 MHz (HD Radio)
- Branding: 105.3 RnB

Programming
- Format: Urban adult contemporary
- Subchannels: HD2: Urban gospel (WPZS simulcast)
- Affiliations: Rickey Smiley Morning Show

Ownership
- Owner: Urban One
- Sister stations: WBT; WBT-FM; WFNZ-FM; WPZS

History
- First air date: 1959
- Former call signs: WAGY-FM (1959-1971); WAGI-FM (1971-2007); WNOW-FM (2007–2012)
- Call sign meaning: Old School Flava

Technical information
- Licensing authority: FCC
- Facility ID: 23006
- Class: C1
- ERP: 51,000 watts
- HAAT: 395 meters (1,296 ft)

Links
- Public license information: Public file; LMS
- Webcast: Listen live
- Website: 1053rnb.com

WOSF (105.3 FM) is an urban adult contemporary station licensed to Gaffney, South Carolina; serving the Charlotte, North Carolina market. WOSF is the Charlotte affiliate of the Rickey Smiley Morning Show. Owned by Urban One, the station's studios are located in South Charlotte near Carowinds, and the transmitter site is located in Dallas, North Carolina.

WOSF is the only commercial station licensed to the South Carolina side of the market that brands itself as a full-market Charlotte station. Indeed, it is the only South Carolina-licensed commercial station that covers Charlotte to any significant extent.

== History ==
The station signed on as WAGY-FM in 1959, as the FM sister to WAGY (AM 1320) in Forest City, North Carolina. The station at the time was partially owned by Raymond Parker. WAGY-FM was sold entirely to Parker, who with his wife, Bright G. Parker, formed Gaffney Broadcasting in 1971 and moved WAGY-FM to Gaffney, pairing it with their AM WEAC, and changing the call letters to WAGI-FM, increasing the power to 100 kW in the process.

WAGI's longtime slogan was "The Upstate Power Station" and was nicknamed for many years by the locals as "Waggie". The station had featured a mixture of Country and Southern Gospel music for many years.

WAGI broadcast local as well as national news from the NBC Radio Network, as well as local sporting events from Gaffney High School, namely Gaffney Indians football. Also, the station had a morning show called "Carolina in the Morning" and a popular show called "Swap & Shop" (heard at 6:35 am, 12:15 pm, & 5:15 pm Monday to Saturday) where listeners could call in to buy, sell, or trade items.

After Raymond Parker, the owner of WAGI, died in 2005, his will stipulated that the station be sold upon the death of his wife, Bright G. Parker. Parker's will stated that the station was to remain in Gaffney, though this was ignored by the executors of his will. Upon her death in 2006, the station was sold to Davidson Media under a lease/purchase agreement.

In late April 2007, it was announced that the station was sold to local interests to ensure that the station remained in the community. Shortly after midnight on April 21, 2007, WAGI ceased operations, moved its studios to Charlotte, North Carolina, then began broadcasting a Regional Mexican format as WNOW-FM, "105.3 Poder FM", under a Local Marketing Agreement targeting the Charlotte market. Listeners were told that WAGI's former programming could be found on the AM station, which had a limited signal range and broadcast only during the day. Gaffney Indian Football moved to 103.3 WOLT, broadcasting from Greer. Fabian Fuentes (a well-known WAGI personality) remained the announcer for the games. During the games, former commercials featured on WAGI could be heard. These commercials were primarily for the Gaffney area.

The station was granted a construction permit to move its transmitter location to Crowder's Mountain in North Carolina, halfway between Kings Mountain and Gastonia (the same location of 101.9 WBAV-FM, with similar coverage). However, this was changed; the station moved to rented space on WBTV's tower in Dallas in June 2009. Even with a power decrease to 51 kW, it still gave WNOW-FM a coverage area comparable to the major Charlotte stations.

Starting in 2011, WNOW-FM aired SportsCenter from ESPN Deportes Radio and hourly sports updates.

During the 2011–12 season, WNOW-FM aired North Carolina Tar Heels men's basketball games, as well as any football games kicking off after 5 pm. This is because the Tar Heel Sports Network's main Charlotte station, WFNZ, had a weak signal at night. This ended after only one season after the Tar Heels signed a new deal with WBT.

On August 16, 2012, Radio One announced that it had acquired WNOW-FM from Gaffney Broadcasting. Pending the close of the purchase, Radio One took over the station's programming via a local marketing agreement on August 27, 2012, ending Davidson's involvement with the station.

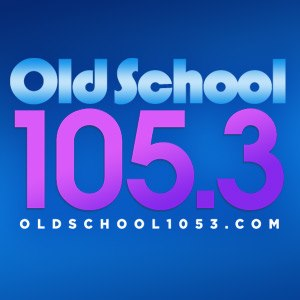
former logo

On August 27, 2012, at 5:00 pm, WNOW-FM flipped to Urban Oldies, branded as "Old School 105.3". Core artists include Luther Vandross, the Isley Brothers, Michael Jackson, Earth, Wind & Fire, and Anita Baker. Radio One regional vice president Gary Weiss said the format had done well on KSOC in the Dallas market. The first song on "Old School" was "Fantastic Voyage" by Lakeside.

The station changed its call letters to WOSF on November 8, 2012, after the WNOW-FM call sign moved to the former WXRK in New York City. After the call letters was dropped in 2014, the call letters were used on its sister station in Indianapolis, where it remained here until 2022.

WOSF operated two translators to improve its coverage—in Charlotte at 96.5 FM, and Dallas (serving Gastonia) at 98.3 FM. In 2014, it sold the translators to Radio Training Network, who converted them into repeaters for its "His Radio" contemporary Christian network. The translators are now part of the license of His Radio flagship WLFJ-FM in Greenville, South Carolina. However, they identified as "His Radio 96.5 and 98.3," and air separate commercials as well. Due to the translators' limited range, the translators' programming was simulcast on WOSF's second HD Radio channel until 2017, when the simulcast moved to a new second channel on WHQC.

On August 1, 2018, WOSF shifted its format from urban oldies to urban adult contemporary, branded as "105.3, Old School + R&B". With the change, the station's playlist shifted from a 1970s-1990s focus to a 1980s to currents direction. Rickey Smiley, Olympia D and D.L. Hughley remain as personalities.

== HD Radio ==
WOSF carried a hip hop format on its second HD Radio subchannel; it was branded as "102.5 The Block" in reference to its carriage on 200-watt FM translator W273DA at 102.5 MHz. "The Block" had been carried on sister station WQNC (92.7 FM) until its conversion to WFNZ-FM in February 2022; prior to this move, the 102.5 translator served as the FM simulcast of WFNZ (610 AM). It began simulcasting again on 610 AM on September 19, 2022.

On December 11, 2025, a series of changes began that includes the urban gospel "Praise" format moving from 100.9 to 610 AM and W273DA at 102.5; it will also be heard on the HD-2 channel of WOSF.
