= The Bob and Sheri Show =

Bob & Sheri
- Genre: Talk, Entertainment, Comedy, Advice
- Running time: 4 hours (6-10 AM ET)
- Country of origin: United States
- Home station: WKQC-FM Charlotte, North Carolina
- Starring: Bob Lacey; Sheri Lynch
- Produced by: Kary "Doc" Bowser; Todd Haller; Max Sweeten
- Original release: 1992 – Present
- Website: Official Website

Bob and Sheri is a syndicated U.S. radio program hosted by Bob Lacey and Sheri Lynch. It is heard in morning drive time. Its flagship station is WKQC-FM "K104.7" in Charlotte, North Carolina. For 29 years, the originating station had been WLNK 107.9 "The Link" (also known as WBT-FM and then WWSN prior to 1997).

The show is owned by NOW! Media and runs on about 70 nationwide affiliates. It is also heard worldwide in 177 countries and 150 ships at sea through the American Forces Network.

Bob Lacey and Sheri Lynch have co-hosted the show since 1992 when Bob, already established on WBT-FM's morning show, chose Sheri as co-host from over 65 applicants.

The syndicated version will end on December 31, 2026, to be replaced by a direct-to-consumer model. The terrestrial cancellation follows Lacey's retirement in early 2025, Beasley Broadcast Group's decision to move another morning show into WKQC's morning drive time slot in September 2026, and a substantial loss in advertising revenue that made syndicating the program no longer viable.

== Format ==
Although the show is promoted as female-slanted, it has gained a share of male listeners as well, developing a loyal nationwide following. Bob and Sheri openly share their quirks and personal lives with listeners, creating an atmosphere. The program is structured as a traditional morning show rather than a morning zoo, and the show has no comedic bits which would offend the show's target audience or stations, nor are they based on stereotypes.

== Cast ==
=== Bob Lacey ===
Bob Schlosser Lacey, raised in Old Lyme, Connecticut, began his career in radio at 19. After stints at various radio stations (and aliases of "Skippy Ross" and "Skip Tyler"), he was hired in 1971 by WBT in Charlotte to host his own evening phone-in show, "Lacey Listens." By 25, he'd been moved to morning-drive with his own talk show. During the 1980s, he was a host on then-sister station WBTV's local edition of PM Magazine, for which he traveled the world and won an Iris Award. Returning to radio at WBT-FM (now WLNK) in 1990, Bob was given his own morning drive show, joined by Sheri in 1992. Bob has five children named Christopher, Landon, Ally, John and one other who has asked not to be spoken about on air. On July 31, 2010, Bob married his girlfriend of a year, Mary, and gained two "bonus children." He enjoys golf, wine, lobster, Maine, pugs, vacationing, lighthouses, and the music of the Rolling Stones. On Tuesday, December 21, 2010, his 19-year-old son, John, died after suffering from a history of seizures. Bob's son Christopher Schlosser died on February 22, 2012, at the age of 44. [3]

=== Sheri Lynch ===
Sheri Lynch grew up in Wyoming and Philadelphia, surviving a harrowing, dysfunctional childhood to which she occasionally refers on-air. She has worked in television and movies but created her own niche in radio when joining the Bob & Sheri Show as an outspoken and articulate partner (not a female sidekick to a male host) in 1992. She has also published two books: Hello, My Name Is Mommy and Be Happy, Or I'll Scream!. She is the mother of two young daughters, Olivia and Caramia, and has several "bonus children". Although the Bob & Sheri Show is mostly comedic, Sheri often gives advice to callers in trouble and has a somewhat dark sense of humor. Sheri recently graduated from Winthrop University with a master's degree in Social Work, focus on clinical mental health. In 2013, she married her husband Kevin, in a private ceremony in South Carolina. A self-proclaimed "crazy cat lady" and animal lover, she and her family own many cats and dogs.

=== Max ===
Max Sweeten is the show's director, but he is often heard in the background and frequently comes to the microphone. He, too, spent some formative years in the Philadelphia area, then in Washington, D.C. He began his radio career in Virginia at age 16. Max, who does a great deal of voice-over work apart from this show, has won four Addy Awards, for his work in radio and TV commercials.

=== Todd ===
"Super Todd" Haller, the show's former producer, screens all the callers and also appears on the air occasionally. He was nominated for Billboard's Music Director of the Year in 1996 for his work at WCHZ in Augusta, Georgia. He has two children. He retired from the show in February 2021.

=== Doc ===
Kary "Doc" Bowser joined the show as the show's producer in April 2021. Doc was formerly the producer of the Matt & Ramona Show on 107.9 The Link.

=== Lamar ===
As The People's Movie Critic, Lamar Richardson gives a weekly film review on the show, usually on Friday. As a proud former Anheuser-Busch employee, Lamar rates each movie on his "Bud Scale." Ratings range from "Zero Buds" to "A full six-pack of Budweiser," though a terrific movie might earn a twelve-pack, and a terrible one may receive a "Warm Zima." Lamar has also on occasion replaced Bob or Sheri in their absence. Lamar has three children, and has worked various jobs outside of radio, most notably an independent video rental store called "Ole Time Video" which was driven out of business by its inability to compete with Blockbuster Video; Richardson's humorous bitterness about this failure is often referred to in running gags due to his status as movie reviewer.

=== Chad Bowar ===
Chad is the newsman for the Bob and Sheri Show. He's been in radio for over 25 years, and has a political science degree from the University of South Dakota. Chad retired from the show in 2019.

=== Jim Szoke ===
Jim Szoke is the Sports Guru for the Bob & Sheri Show. Throughout the years, Jim has been a play-by-play voice for the Charlotte 49ers and Davidson College. Jim is currently part of the broadcast team for the Carolina Panthers. He's a graduate of Bowling Green State University and has a bachelor's degree in journalism. He lives in Charlotte with his wife and two kids.

== Frequent guests ==
- Ellen Whitehurst is an author and a contributor to various magazines and talk shows. Bob and Sheri refer to her as their "Shui-strologist." Typically at the beginning of each month, she offers the hosts and listeners advice about feng shui, astrology, and other "new age" / ancient remedies. Ellen Whitehurst died in her sleep on Sunday, October 30, 2016, from heart failure.
- Cool King Chris is a musician/art teacher/film teacher that loves to teach controversy and show movies to the class. He periodically writes and performs original and parody songs on the show. He has had many close encounters of the third kind. He currently lives within the internal memory of a Commodore computer. He is also a fan of Banksy and Mr. Brainwash.

== Awards ==
The Bob and Sheri Show has been nominated four times for Billboard’s "Air Personality of the Year". They won the New York State Broadcasters Association Award for Best Morning Team in 1998. The show won the prestigious Gracie Award for Best Talk Show/Radio in 2005. The team has been nominated ten times for The National Association of Broadcasters' Marconi Award.

Sheri has thrice received the Gracie Allen Award, in 2002, 2005 and 2012. In 2004, Sheri won the Charlotte Business Journal’s "Women in Business Achievement Award." Sheri has also been named Creative Loafing's "Best Local Radio Personality" each year for over a decade.

== Slogans ==
- "America's Original Reality Show"
- "Real People. Real Laughs."
- "Start Your Mornings Off With A Laugh"

== Running gags ==
These occasionally confuse new callers, but regular listeners are familiar with these:

- Chit-Chat: Sheri's daughters' nickname for Bob is 'Chit-Chat.' He tolerates their taunts of "Bob is a chit-chat," but it irks him when Sheri says it on air.
- Cone of Safety: When Bob or Sheri calls for the Cone of Safety, Max plays a whooshing sound effect, then anyone "in the cone" is able to speak without fear of being judged for it.
- "First-time caller (Bob!)": When callers identify themselves as first-time callers, Bob and Sheri give them finger snaps. Bob sometimes acts irritated at having to do this every time; he once complained about it and his protest only encouraged listeners to say it more.
- Uncle Creepy: A character Bob plays when something sexually inappropriate is being reported on the show. Listeners can tell when Bob is in the character because the background music is a scary string track.
- Scott: Todd Haller, the show's producer, is occasionally referred to as 'Scott' when he messes up the name of someone calling into the show.
- Sheri's Minions: Callers who often identify with Sheri's positions and disagree with Bob. Sometimes, Bob plays the devil's advocate for the sake of entertainment, but when he is particularly irked that no one agrees with him, he refers to Sheri and her "minions."
- Bob's Miata: One weekend Sheri borrowed Bob's sports car and "did the deed", with her then husband, in the front seat of the small vehicle. Whenever the subject is brought up, Bob seems irked as Sheri adds detail to the story.
- Shhhhhhh: Every once in a while a caller will request for Bob and Sheri to not tell anyone the story they are about to tell on air, at which point Bob addresses the audience and makes a shushing sound and asks all listeners to not tell anyone. This originated from a listener who called in to tell about her polygamy, and when asked if any of her husbands knew about this, she said "Well, no, but shhh..."
- And Now Another List from Bob; Bob will frequently recite lists gathered from other media sources. The other cast members often tease him for his fondness for these lists, such as "The Worst Foods to Use as a Doorstop", "How to Kick in a Door", and the annual holiday list "The Costs of the 12 Days of Christmas".
- Mommy the Yorkie; Mommy is the nickname for Bob's wife's former Yorkie. The dog was nicknamed "Mommy" after Sheri shared that her cousin once had a Yorkie named Mommy. This nickname irks Bob, but he has now began referring to Daisy as "Mommy," as well. Daisy has since been placed in a new loving home, reportedly not because of Bob, but because Mary's children failed to properly care for the Yorkie.
- The Book of Bob: An ongoing tome penned by Sheri, filled with Bob's frequent pronouncements; i.e. "My germs are helpful."

== History ==
After 10 years hosting "PM Magazine" on WBTV, Bob Lacey returned to Charlotte morning radio in December 1989 on what was then WBCY. By the time Lacey persuaded his company to hire WBTV marketing employee Sheri Lynch to join him, the station was WBT-FM "Sunny 107.9." Local management did not like the idea of "Bob and Sheri," so Lacey contacted the Atlanta headquarters of Jefferson-Pilot Communications, and he put up $10,000 of his own money in case the show did not work. He never had to give up the money; the company hired new managers who supported Bob and Sheri.

In early 1996, Bob and Sheri were number two in the morning—behind John Boy and Billy—among listeners 25 to 54. In order to keep the duo in Charlotte but still pay them as if they worked in the big city, Sunny 107.9 began working toward syndicating the show, and landed their first affiliate on WCTW in Hudson, New York in July of that year. The content would allow the show to work in other parts of the country, and it would not matter that they weren't local. People knew Rush Limbaugh and Howard Stern were not in Charlotte. This show was the first syndicated morning show for adult contemporary radio and the first to feature a woman in a lead role.

In less than eight months, Bob and Sheri were heard in seven new markets: Greensboro, North Carolina; Greenville, North Carolina; Bangor, Maine; New London, Connecticut; Charleston, West Virginia; Hudson, New York; and Albany, Georgia.

In September 1998, the number of stations reached 17. Except for Durango, Colorado, all of these were in the eastern United States. Fayetteville, North Carolina was the fifth of the markets where the show competed with John Boy and Billy.

By 2003, the show was on 63 stations, with markets that included Presque Isle, Maine, Santa Rosa, California, Yuma, Arizona, and Eugene, Oregon.

The debut of personal people meters in 2010 meant changes for the show. Other stations succeeded with more music and less talk, so the show was adding music and cutting down on time spent with callers. Not all listeners accepted the changes.

After Radio One purchased flagship station WLNK in November 2020, the company decided to drop Bob and Sheri in April 2021. NOW! Media, which bought the show from former WLNK owner Entercom in 2017, continues to distribute it. About 70 stations air the show and it is available through podcast as well. The move by WLNK led to significant fan protests. On May 17, Bob and Sheri were scheduled to move to WKQC in Charlotte. As a result of the COVID-19 pandemic, the pair were doing the show from home, but WKQC owner Beasley Broadcast Group was expected to have the show originate from their studios.

Lacey announced he would retire at the end of January 2025 and spend more time with his family. Lamar, Max, and Kary Bowser will continue to be a part of the show.

In 2026, the show announced plans to end syndication on December 31, switching to a direct-to-consumer model. Around 50 stations were airing the show.
