= WSOC-FM =

Country music radio station in Charlotte, North Carolina

Coordinates: 35.252°N 80.686°W

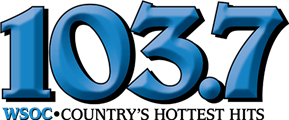
- Charlotte, North Carolina; United States
- Broadcast area: Charlotte/Metrolina
- Frequency: 103.7 MHz (HD Radio)
- Branding: Country 103.7

Programming
- Format: Country
- Subchannels: HD2: Country "NuTune Country"; HD3: Tropical music "Playa 94.7"

Ownership
- Owner: Beasley Broadcast Group; (Beasley Media Group Licenses, LLC)
- Sister stations: WBAV-FM, WKQC,WPEG

History
- First air date: 1948; 78 years ago
- Call sign meaning: "Sounds of Charlotte"

Technical information
- Facility ID: 20339
- Class: C
- ERP: 100,000 watts
- HAAT: 411 meters (1,348 ft)
- Translator: HD3: 94.7 W234BY (Charlotte)

Links
- Webcast: Listen live
- Website: country1037fm.com

WSOC-FM (103.7 MHz) is a commercial radio station in Charlotte, North Carolina. It is owned by Beasley Broadcast Group and airs a country music radio format, calling itself "Country 103.7". Its primary country competitor is iHeartMedia's WKKT. WSOC-FM's studios are located on South Boulevard in Charlotte's South End and the transmitter is located in East Charlotte near Reedy Creek Park.

WSOC shares its call sign with previously co-owned WSOC-TV, Charlotte's ABC network affiliate.

== History ==
=== Early years ===
WSOC-FM first signed on the air in 1948. It was the second FM station to begin broadcasting in Charlotte after 106.7 WMIT, which signed on in 1941. (Because WMIT moved to Black Mountain, North Carolina, in the 1960s, WSOC-FM can claim it is now Charlotte's oldest FM station.) WSOC-FM originally was powered at 38,000 watts, a third of its current output. The FM station mostly simulcast programming from sister station AM 1240 WSOC, an NBC Radio Network affiliate, carrying its schedule of dramas, comedies, news, sports, soap operas, game shows and big band broadcasts during the "Golden Age of Radio". It gained a television sister in 1957, when WSOC-TV signed on as an NBC-TV affiliate.

In 1960, WSOC moved from AM 1240 to AM 930. As network programming moved from radio to television, WSOC-AM-FM began airing a local full service middle of the road format with hourly NBC Radio newscasts, sports and features.

During the 1960s, WSOC-FM received FCC permission to increase power to its current 100,000 watts, expanding coverage with a good radio to Winston-Salem, Asheboro and Spartanburg. WSOC-FM then began airing an easy listening format separate from the AM station, although still simulcasting some segments from 930.

=== 1970s ===
In the 1960s, Charlotte had two AM country stations, WKTC and WAME, but no FM stations were broadcasting country music in stereo. In 1971, WSOC-FM flipped to a country format, that at first was mostly automated. John Harper, program director of WSOC AM and then of both the AM and FM stations, became morning host and, except for one year when he was in management, continued to host the show until 1977. He had a hard time convincing station management that country music would be successful.

Don Bell worked as WSOC-FM's program director from 1975 to 1987, hiring many of the station's most popular announcers, and working on the air as well. He played a major role in making WSOC one of Charlotte's top radio stations. Before moving to Charlotte, Bell worked at KFRE and KMJ in Fresno, California and WIOD in Miami.

In 1977, despite a consultant's view that country would never be a viable FM format, Bell moved forward with his plans to take WSOC-FM off an automated system and go with live DJs from morning to night.

Harper, who was number three among morning hosts, was let go due to "philosophical difference" and replaced with automation. morning show host Bob Call. Call, who thought he was auditioning for a spot on WSOC's AM station, decided to take the job even though he had no knowledge or appreciation for country music. Bill Ellis, who started at WSOC as a copywriter in 1975, was given helicopter traffic duties and served as the station's mid-day announcer.

Country music was evolving, and its popularity grew as the result of the movie Urban Cowboy. WSOC-FM was getting ready for big changes.

Edd Robinson moved to afternoons on WSOC-FM in 1979 after 11 years at 1480 WAME, which had left the country format. He remained at WSOC-FM until late 1987. Bob Brandon, who also had worked on WAME, was hired by Bell in 1981 to do the evening shift. He remained with the station until 1986. He also briefly did a stint under Paul Johnson in 1995–1996.

=== 1980s ===
In 1980, Bob Call moved to Denver as Program Director at KYGO-FM. WSOC-FM hired Bill Dollar as its morning host. Dollar had worked for WGST in Atlanta and was familiar with WSOC-FM owner Cox Enterprises. He wanted to start his own station in Boone, North Carolina and had no plans to stay long. Bell said he liked Dollar's voice and warmth, and that he was staid, unlike the rising morning zoo hosts of the time. Bell wanted WSOC-FM to be full service radio like WBT, combining information and entertainment.

In 1982, Dollar succeeded Robert Murphy of WAYS/WROQ, and unlike Murphy, he generally avoided any mention of the locally based televangelist organization, The PTL Club, often called "Pass the Loot" by its critics and a constant target of derision on other stations, even when the outfit fell in 1987 from multiple scandals.

On June 29, 1987, Bill Ellis did his midday show for the last time before leaving to do the morning show for WSSL-FM in Greenville, South Carolina, after 11 years at WSOC-FM. Program director Paul Johnson said Ellis would likely not have replaced Dollar anytime soon, so if he wanted to be a morning host, he had to go elsewhere. Ellis went on to host WSSL's Ellis and James Show, garnering 5 CMA Broadcast nominations. Bill Ellis was hired on at WSSL by former WSOC general sales manager John Cullen who had become WSSL's general manager.

For seven years, Dollar was Charlotte's top DJ, and in October 1989 after three nominations, he received the Broadcast Personality of the Year award (medium markets) from the Country Music Association.

In Fall 1989, Dollar returned to the #1 position after WRFX's John Boy and Billy replaced him in the summer, a ratings period during which urban contemporary-formatted WPEG became number one.

=== 1990s ===
In 1991, WPEG became Charlotte's top station and remained in that position, though WSOC-FM was still one of the top country stations in the United States.

In 1992, Cox sold WSOC and WSOC-FM, but kept WSOC-TV. The FM station went to EZ Communications (also owner of WMXC) as part of a trade with WHQT in Miami. The AM went to Bible Broadcasting Network, switching to a Christian talk and teaching format, becoming WYFQ.

In August 1994, Dollar had been WSOC-FM's morning host for 14 years, the longest of anyone in Charlotte. But Dollar's ratings with 25-54 listeners were down. When he returned from vacation, on his 44th birthday, he learned he had been moved to middays, replaced in the morning by Paul Schadt and Cindy O'Day. Program director Paul Johnson said the change would attract younger listeners with "a more contemporary face" and "energy, entertainment and fun". The station tried to claim Dollar asked for the change, but he would not confirm that.

Claire B. Lang replaced O'Day as Schadt's co-host in October 1996. She had previously been a newscaster on John Boy and Billy's show. Johnson called her "outrageous". She would continue as "Inside NASCAR" host on The Nashville Network as well as covering NASCAR for Sports Illustrated.

Dollar was killed in a head-on collision near Gastonia in November 1996, and WSOC declared a day of mourning. Music director Rick McCracken, who also worked overnights, took Dollar's slot temporarily and later returned to late nights. Mike Terry, who had hosted middays before, moved back to that slot to replace Dollar, and Jason Dean took over afternoons from Terry. Dean had hosted "The Nite Shift" from Los Angeles on the Blair Garner "After Midnight Entertainment" network, and he had also worked in San Francisco and Detroit. John Crenshaw's "Country Heartlines" continued in the evenings.

WSOC-FM would gain four sister stations (WBAV-FM, WBAV AM, WNKS and WPEG) in December 1996 from Evergreen Media, as part of a multi-market swap. (Evergreen received EZ Communications' Philadelphia stations WIOQ and WUSL in return.) EZ was bought by American Radio Systems in July 1997. On September 19, 1997, ARS was acquired by CBS's Infinity Broadcasting, making WSOC-FM a CBS owned and operated station.

In December 1997, Schadt moved to rival country outlet WKKT after 16 years at WSOC. In February 1998, WSOC fired Schadt's partner Claire B. Lang. WSOC was still number two in Charlotte, and hoping to stay that way, when the station added Big Paul and "Aunt Eloise" of WTQR in Winston-Salem, North Carolina. The two morning hosts intended to go back and forth between the two stations, and syndication to more stations was considered. "Big Paul" Franklin was from Gastonia, while the identity of Aunt Eloise remained a mystery. In October 2008, "Aunt Eloise" was revealed to be Toby Young after he was fired from WTQR. The pairing lasted only eight months. Dave Temple and Terry Blake would then take over.

=== 2000s ===
In Fall 2000, WSOC-FM was 12th in the Charlotte market, while WKKT was fifth. Infinity Broadcasting management needed to make changes. Kevin O'Neal became program director and WSOC-FM brought back its outside-of-morning-drive policy of playing 12 songs in a row, without commercials. It hired top Columbia, South Carolina personality Jeff Roper as morning host with Blake remaining as sidekick.

The strategy worked. In Summer 2001, WSOC was Charlotte's top station for the first time in about 10 years. Roper's Morning Show was named 2003 Country Music Association Broadcast Personality of the Year (large markets) in 2003. Roper made it to number two among morning hosts in the ratings.

Roper left WSOC-FM as Program Director while it was at #2 in the ratings, behind adult contemporary WLYT. Roper returned to Columbia to sign on on a new station, WWNU.

Infinity changed its name to CBS Radio on December 14, 2005, as part of the spin-off of CBS' motion picture and cable television assets under a relaunched Viacom.

On February 24, 2009, the Academy of Country Music announced that WSOC-FM had won the award for "Major Market Radio Station of the Year".

=== 2010s ===
Catherine Lane, midday personality for WSOC-FM, was nominated for On-Air Personality of the Year by ACM.

Charlotte Observer writer Mark Washburn calls morning man Rob Tanner "one of the most successful figures in the history of country radio in Charlotte".

On September 26, 2011, WSOC-FM rebranded as "The New 103.7". It changed slogans from "Charlotte's #1 Country" to "Country's Hottest Hits". The station dropped most songs recorded before the 1990s, while increasing an emphasis on current music.

Tanner in the Morning welcomed new co-host Guenn Schneider on October 4, 2012. Previously, she worked for CBS Radio sister stations WNKS and WKQC.

On October 2, 2014, CBS Radio announced that it would trade its Tampa and Charlotte stations (including WSOC-FM), as well as WIP in Philadelphia to the Beasley Broadcast Group in exchange for 5 stations located in Miami and Philadelphia. The swap was completed on December 1, 2014.

In June 2015, WSOC-FM had its highest ratings in the PPM era. The "Tanner in the Morning" show was rated the #1 morning show in the Charlotte market, and was a nominee for ACM "Major Market Personalities of the Year".

=== 2020s ===
In 2026, the hosts of Tanner in the Morning announced they would be leaving the station. This was part of a corporate buyout of contracts by Beasley in a cost-saving move. On June 22, afternoon hosts Charlie & Debbie Nance moved to the morning slot on WSOC.

== HD Radio ==
On September 22, 2023, WSOC's HD3 subchannel changed their format from sports to all-podcasts, branded as "Podcast Radio US".
