= John Boy and Billy =

American radio hosts

The John Boy & Billy Big Show
- Genre: Talk, Comedy, Politics, Sports
- Running time: 4 hours per episode, Monday through Friday
- Country of origin: United States
- Language: English
- Syndicates: Premiere Networks; Fox News Radio
- Hosted by: John Isley; Billy James
- Starring: Terry Hanson; Jeff Pillars; Robert D. Raiford (retired 2016)
- Created by: John Isley; Billy James
- Directed by: Jeff Kent
- Produced by: Jackie Curry-Lynch
- Recording studio: Charlotte, North Carolina
- Original release: November 8, 1986 – December 31, 2025
- Website: TheBigShow.com

John Isley (born August 15, 1956) and Billy James (born August 31, 1957), known as John Boy & Billy, are American radio hosts based in Charlotte, North Carolina. From 1986 to 2025, their comedic morning program The John Boy & Billy Big Show broadcast from 6:00 a.m. to 9:00 a.m. Central Time in several Southern and Midwestern states via syndication through Premiere Networks, primarily airing on classic rock, active rock, and country music stations.

The format consists of talk segments intermixed with music, contests, and skit-based humor. The two lead hosts serve as a double act, with John Boy the comic foil and Billy the straight man. Current events, right-wing politics, sports (mainly race car drivers), and male-oriented problems are common topics of talk. Broadcast states include North Carolina, Pensacola, Florida, Georgia, Baldwin, County, South Carolina, Mississippi, Tennessee, Texas, Virginia, and West Virginia, Illinois and Kansas by KVGB (1590 AM / 97.7 FM) in Great Bend.

The duo frequently interviews musicians, comedians, NASCAR drivers, professional wrestlers, and other public figures, such as Robert Earl Keen, Killer Beaz, Manny Pacquiao, Stephen Curry, Rodney Carrington, James Gregory, Pat McCrory, and the late Tim Wilson. The show also markets a line of Bar-B-Que sauces (named John Boy & Billy Grillin' Sauce).

The show ended on December 31, 2025.

== History ==
For more than five years, John Boy and Billy hosted the morning show at Top 40 WBCY 107.9 FM in Charlotte. Their comic talents made them number one with the station's 18 to 34 listeners. But John Boy quit in February 1986, while Billy stayed for a month and a half, partnering unsuccessfully with Bob Lacey and Jim "Catfish" Prewitt.

Competing station WRFX 99.7 FM changed to album rock that same year and needed a morning show. WRFX signed John Boy and Billy to be the station's wake up hosts, but they could not start their new show until November due to a noncompete clause. A $250,000 billboard and television campaign, in which they had bags over their heads, preceded their return. On November 8 at 9:00 a.m., WRFX announced, "They're back!" and played "The Boys Are Back in Town" by Thin Lizzy. One difference on the new station, said John Boy, was "We'll actually listen to the music ... we're rock 'n' roll guys."

John Boy was arrested at a night club October 21, 1990, and charged with felony possession of marijuana, but the charge was later reduced to a misdemeanor because the amount was small. As part of his plea agreement, John Boy agreed to broadcast anti-drug messages on WRFX.

Early in 1993, news came out that John Boy and Billy were being asked by Mel Karmazin (boss to Howard Stern) to move to Atlanta and syndicate their show. At the time, WROQ in Greenville, was the only other station carrying the show. WRFX general manager Jack Daniel said the station made a six-year deal that would keep John Boy and Billy at WRFX but also allow the show to be heard in Atlanta, Raleigh, Columbia, as well as Texas, with the hosts getting a share of syndication income. One disadvantage, however; the show would need to include less locally oriented humor that people in other markets might not understand.

By August 1994, the show was heard on 14 stations, most of them of rock format. Two of the stations were sports talk--WRFX-AM (co-owned with flagship WRFX-FM) and WFNS in Tampa. The other stations were in WZZU in Raleigh; WROQ in Greenville; WSFL in New Bern, North Carolina; WXFX in Montgomery; WYBB in Charleston, South Carolina; WMFX in Columbia; WKLC in Charleston, West Virginia; WDRK in Panama City Beach; WVRK in Columbus, Georgia; WJMX-FM in Florence; WIMZ in Knoxville; and WEKL in Augusta. WRFX-AM went back to sports talk in the morning early in 1995.

On July 6, the show added KZPS in Dallas, which was the largest radio market yet, #7 at the time. Till that time, its largest markets had been Orlando and Nashville, but now John Boy and Billy had the potential to be mentioned alongside Stern and Don Imus in the radio syndication business. (KZPS has since discontinued the show, but the network currently has six affiliates in Texas.) John Boy hoped to be heard in the North, too, though many doubted that would work.

By 1996, the show was heard on 28 stations in 10 states. In June of that year the first country station to air the show was WMTD-FM in Beckley, West Virginia.

In 1999, John Boy and Billy were being heard on 65 rock stations in 18 states, but the show was expected to dramatically increase its potential audience when the producers added the option of country music. WHSL in Greensboro, which was owned by Capstar Broadcasting (same as WRFX and the John Boy and Billy Network), was one of the first country stations in the network. Prophet Systems Innovations, also owned by Capstar, developed the technology to easily allow different musical programs between talk segments. About three rock songs were played per hour, though country songs tended to be shorter and there might be more of them. Macon Moye, vice president and general manager of the John Boy and Billy network, said the addition of country music would allow the show to be heard in northern states where the show would not fit a rock format. Sean Ross, editor of Airplay Monitor, cautioned that the show might be "too edgy and too male" for some country stations, but Tom Taylor, editor of the M Street Daily Fax in Nashville, believed the show had great potential to expand.

By 2002, 110 stations carried the show. At this time, oldies stations could broadcast the show with songs specific to their format. This was true when classic rock stations inadvertently aired the Queen song "Another One Bites the Dust" immediately after the show reported about the Beltway sniper attacks in October 2002. Executive producer Randy Brazell said songs were selected in advance and stored using complicated computer software. After the hosts learned from an affiliate what had happened, they decided that to mention it on the air would give the incident more attention; perhaps people had not noticed.

In 2008 the show gained its first New Jersey affiliate, country music station 106.7 WKOE in North Cape May. In April 2009, the show went north of the Mason–Dixon line and went on the air on 95.9 WZDB Sykesville, Pennsylvania, "Rockin the Northern Alleghenies."

The show was pre-recorded ahead of time for playback from 6:00 a.m. to 10:00 a.m. Eastern Time. Each day's broadcast could also be streamed on the iHeartMedia app and was made available later in the day as the "Late Riser's Podcast," with all the music and many of the commercials removed for a typical overall running time of 70-90 minutes.

The show's final broadcast on WRFX occurred on November 15, 2024. It continued to run in syndication on iHeart's Premier Networks, airing on other stations throughout the Southeast.

The show ended on December 31, 2025. Thirty-seven stations were still airing the show when its end was announced in October of that year.

== Discography ==
John Boy and Billy released a series of albums from 1988 to 2008, consisting of comedy sketches from their show.

=== Main albums ===
- Economically Priced First Album (1988)
- Head Cleaner (1990)
- Straight, White & Southern (1991)
- Big Ol' Hairy Album (1992)
- Two For the Show (1993)
- Love Ya…Mean It (1994)
- Southern Exposure (1995)
- Dixie Diner (1996)
- A Barrel of Laughs (1997)
- Silly Season (1997)
- Rocket Science (1998)
- Radioland (1999)
- Freakshow (2001)
- Rough Cuts (2002)
- Karl Childers: Potted Meat (2006)
- American Goobers (2007)
- Karl Childers: Potted Meat Rides Again (2007)
- Ike at the Mike (2008)
- Songs We Love to Sing (2008)

=== Compilations ===
- Christmas Album (1996)
- Nerve-Wrackin’ Christmas Part 2 (2001)
- John Boy & Billy: Best of 20 (2001)
- Big Ol' Hairy Christmas (2005)

=== Box set ===
- John Boy & Billy in a Box (1992; consists of the first four albums listed above; no longer available)

== Other events ==
John Boy and Billy have a "Comedy Classic Weekend" every year at The Omni Grove Park Inn in Asheville, North Carolina, where they make public appearances along with the crew and guest comedians.
