= WNLV =

K-Love affiliate in Charlotte, North Carolina, United States

Coordinates: 35.362°N 81.155°W

- Charlotte, North Carolina; United States
- Broadcast area: Charlotte metropolitan area
- Frequency: 95.1 MHz (HD Radio)

Programming
- Format: Contemporary Christian
- Subchannels: HD2: K-Love Eras; HD3: Air1
- Network: K-Love

Ownership
- Owner: K-Love, Inc.

History
- First air date: July 29, 1962
- Former call signs: WIST-FM (1962–1972); WRNA (1972–1973); WROQ (1973–1990); WZZG (1990–1991); WGKL-FM (1991); WAQQ (1991–1994); WEDJ (1994–1996); WNKS (1996-2026)

Technical information
- Licensing authority: FCC
- Facility ID: 53975
- Class: C
- ERP: 100,000 watts (analog); 3,980 watts (digital)
- HAAT: 470 meters (1,540 ft)

Links
- Public license information: Public file; LMS
- Website: klove.com

WNLV (95.1 FM) is a non-commercial radio station licensed to serve Charlotte, North Carolina. The station is owned by K-Love, Inc. and broadcasts a contemporary Christian format from its transmitter near Dallas, North Carolina.

This facility began broadcasting as WIST-FM, the sister station to WIST (1240 AM), in 1962. It broadcast beautiful music and oldies formats in its first years before becoming progressive rock outlet WRNA in 1968. Under the ownership of WAYS (610 AM) beginning in 1973, the station flipped to a hybrid of Top 40 and rock as WROQ, rising to become one of the market's highest-rated stations in the 1970s. With the format's declining ratings, WROQ became a contemporary hit radio (CHR) outlet in 1984, flipped to oldies in 1986, and returned to CHR two years later under the new call sign WZZG—the first of four call signs the station had in a six-year period.

What was then WEDJ became WNKS "Kiss 95.1" on May 31, 1996, ahead of a rapid period of consolidating that saw the station end up with CBS Radio. From 1998 to 2011, WNKS was the originating station for the nationally syndicated Ace & TJ Show. CBS Radio traded its Charlotte stations to Beasley Broadcast Group in 2014. Beasley sold WNKS in 2026 to K-Love Inc., which resulted in a flip to their national K-Love network and a call sign change to WNLV.

== History ==
=== WIST-FM, WRNA and WROQ ===
The station signed on July 29, 1962, as WIST-FM with a beautiful music format, and was co-owned with WIST (1240 AM). In just a few years, WIST-FM flipped to oldies, one of the first FM stations to ever try the format. In the summer of 1967, WIST-FM went silent. In January 1968, the station, now under the ownership of Belk Broadcasting, returned to the air and changed to a progressive rock format with the new letters WRNA. Calvin Walker was "the torchbearer for progressive rock and album cuts on WRNA-FM", according to Charlie Hanna of The Charlotte Observer.

In January 1973, SIS Broadcasting, owners of 61 Big WAYS (610 AM), bought WRNA-FM. The following month, the station, which was number 10 in the market, was switched to WROQ with a format of "adult rock". People complained that WROQ did not play "harder" rock like WRNA, instead playing a mix of Top 40 and "more esoteric numbers". Among those who apparently did not like the change was operations manager Walker, who left for WRPL in April 1973. However, WROQ went to number five "on a cumulative basis" in the metro ratings after four months. Progressive rock on WROQ was limited to simulcasts of In Concert on ABC on some Friday nights and a Saturday program. The "adult rock" format included some jazz, and WROQ was one of only two area stations playing classical music in 1975, with four hours on Sunday morning.

WROQ went by the moniker "95Q". Among the WROQ/WAYS DJs to become major celebrities were Robert Murphy (who went to greater fame in Chicago), and actor Jay Thomas, who went to KPWR in Los Angeles as the host of The Power 106 Morning Zoo. Larry Sprinkle, a WCNC-TV morning weather personality, also worked at the stations. The stations would simulcast in morning drive, while running separate programming the rest of the day. The progressive rock format would evolve into album-oriented rock in the early 1980s.

=== First Top 40 era ===
With album rock declining in popularity, WROQ became a CHR station called "Q95" in August 1984. By January 1989, WROQ evolved into a rock-leaning Top 40 format, better known as "Rock 40". Its AM sister station would simulcast WROQ during morning and afternoon drive-times during this time period, though it would flip to oldies in 1986. Also in 1986, SIS Radio would sell the two stations to CRB Broadcasting, who would then sell the stations again, first to Adams Radio in 1988, then to Tenore Broadcasting the following year.

On January 19, 1990, at 3 pm, after stunting with a 19-hour loop of "Shock the Monkey" by Peter Gabriel (which even prompted a call to local police services, thinking the station was being taken hostage), the station returned to CHR as WZZG, "Gorilla Radio, The New Z95.1 FM", which was partially inspired by the success of "Pirate Radio" in Los Angeles. By the end of the station's run, the station had a dayparted format of Top 40 during the day and more heavy metal in the evenings. In addition, the station would drop the "Gorilla Radio" portion of the moniker to just be named "Z95.1".

=== Flip to oldies; second Top 40 era ===
The return to CHR did not last long; Adams Radio would buy the station back in late 1990. On December 21 of that year, after playing "Free Bird" by Lynyrd Skynyrd, WZZG became WGKL-FM, "Kool 95.1", an oldies format emphasizing 1950s music more than Magic 96.1, using Satellite Music Network's "Pure Gold" format. The flip occurred because of a company-wide initiative where most of Adams' stations flipped to the format. This format, however, would last just a short time. After a few months, the station added a local airstaff, but by the station's end, the entire staff was let go and the station went completely automated again, with listeners being asked to call in and suggest what format they would like to hear. The flip to oldies would also bankrupt the entire company, resulting in Adams' stations being placed in receivership and being sold off one by one.

On October 3, 1991, WGKL began stunting with a different format each day, using other formats from Satellite Music Networks (including Real Country, Stardust, Z-Rock, oldies, and a simulcast of News/talk WCNT, with listeners being allowed to vote on the new format. However, at noon on October 14, the announced result was "None of the above". The station then returned to CHR as WAQQ, "95 Double Q", which started with a "25,000 Songs in a Row, Commercial Free" promotion, beginning with "Groovy Train" by The Farm. The "Double Q" moniker was meant to remind listeners of WROQ (whose call letters were transferred to WCKN in Anderson, South Carolina). The "Double Q" format was more of a mix of Top 40 and alternative rock music, which was starting to become popular during this time. In March 1993, AT&T would acquire the stations temporarily due to Adams' bankruptcy while a permanent owner was being sought. Pyramid Broadcasting, then-owners of WRFX, would buy the stations in September.

On January 15, 1994, after a one-day stunt with a 10 kHz tone, the station rebranded as "95.1 The Edge", with new callsign WEDJ implemented on February 14. The station was initially a broad-based mainstream Top 40, which shifted towards a modern rock lean by the Summer of 1995. However, this backfired, as competition from WEND (which aired a straightforward modern rock format) forced WEDJ to shift back to a mainstream direction by January 1996. In July 1995, Pyramid would merge with Evergreen Media (its AM sister station, by then WAQS, would be sold to SFX Broadcasting).

On May 31, 1996, after a brief stunt, WEDJ relaunched as "Kiss 95.1", becoming the second station in Charlotte to use the "Kiss" moniker, the first being WCKZ, which is now current sister WBAV. The first song on the relaunched "Kiss" was "I Go Blind" by Hootie & the Blowfish. The following day, WEDJ changed call letters to the current WNKS to match the "Kiss" moniker. In December 1996, WNKS (as well as Evergreen's 4 other Charlotte stations) was traded to EZ Communications (owners of WSOC-FM and WSSS; WRFX-FM would go to SFX Broadcasting), with Evergreen receiving EZ Communications' Philadelphia stations WIOQ and WUSL in return. EZ would then be bought by American Radio Systems in July, which would reunite WNKS with its long-time AM sister station (by this point WRFX, now WFNZ; WFNZ would be sold to Entercom in November 2016). ARS would be bought out by Infinity Broadcasting on September 19, 1997, with Infinity changing its name to CBS Radio in December 2005 as part of the spin-off of CBS' motion picture and cable television assets under a relaunched Viacom.

WNKS formerly served as the flagship for the syndicated Ace & TJ Show, which ran on the station from its debut on April 6, 1998, until May 20, 2011, when the duo left for WHQC due to a contract dispute. They were replaced by afternoon host Otis in August. In March 2012, Otis moved back to afternoons, and Drex & Maney, formerly of WHBQ-FM in Memphis, officially took over morning drive. Cassiday Proctor would join a month later from KAMX in Austin. On January 5, 2015, Drex and Cassiday announced they would be leaving the station for a morning show position at WSTR in Atlanta. Maney remained at WNKS, and was joined by new co-hosts LauRen (formerly of WZGV) and Roy (formerly of WXLK) the following month.

On October 2, 2014, CBS Radio announced that it would trade all of their Tampa and Charlotte stations (including WNKS), as well as WIP in Philadelphia to the Beasley Broadcast Group in exchange for 5 stations located in Miami and Philadelphia. The swap was completed on December 1, 2014.

On July 13, 2022, it was reported that The Ace & TJ Show, would return to WNKS on July 18. Current morning hosts Maney and LauRen lost an hour as a result of the move. In May 2024, it was announced the show would move to WKQC, with program director Cameron Moore's midday show moving from noon-3 pm to 10 am-3 pm. The Maney and LauRen Morning Show also expanded by adding another hour, moving back to their previous 6-10 am time slot.

=== Kiss Trivia ===
WNKS used the same logo as WXKS-FM ("Kiss 108"), a fellow Top-40 station but owned by iHeartMedia and based in Boston, Massachusetts. This dates back to when both stations were owned by Pyramid Broadcasting, and later Evergreen Media.

Kiss 95.1 entered the national spotlight in 2016 when morning show hosts Maney, Roy & LauRen became recurring cast members of TLC's My Big Fat Fabulous Life.

=== K-LOVE ===
On August 3, 2026, Beasley Media Group announced the sale of WNKS to K-Love Inc. (formerly the Educational Media Foundation), with plans to transition the frequency to their national Christian radio network K-LOVE. Sister station KXTE (X107.5) in Las Vegas, Nevada, is also included in this sale. Beasley subsequently announced that The Maney & LauRen Morning Show would migrate to sister station WKQC (K104.7) to continue broadcasting in the Charlotte market. The "Kiss" format ended shortly after 7pm on September 30, 2026, with the final song played being "I Knew It, I Knew You" by Taylor Swift, which was abruptly cut-off mid-song when K-Love began operations of the station. The call sign was subsequently changed to WNLV.
