= WZZQ =

Radio station in Gaffney, South Carolina

- Gaffney, South Carolina; United States
- Frequency: 1500 kHz
- Branding: Gaffney's Hot FM

Programming
- Format: Adult hits, local news and sports

Ownership
- Owner: Dennis Fowler; (Fowler Broadcast Communications Inc.)

History
- First air date: 1962 (as WEAC)
- Former call signs: WEAC (1962–2009)

Technical information
- Licensing authority: FCC
- Facility ID: 23005
- Class: D
- Power: 1,000 watts day; 500 watts critical hours
- Transmitter coordinates: 35°5′18.5″N 81°38′39.3″W
- Translator: 104.3 W282AX (Gaffney)

Links
- Public license information: Public file; LMS
- Webcast: Listen live
- Website: www.wzzqradio.com

WZZQ (1500 AM) is a radio station licensed to Gaffney, South Carolina.

As WEAC, the station took over the former programming of sister FM WAGI in 2007. WOLT took over Gaffney High School broadcasts. Dennis Fowler, who served as Gaffney Broadcasting station manager, bought WEAC at the time Davidson Media Group bought WAGI.

WZZQ transmits from the original WAGI studio on Providence Road in Gaffney and broadcast in the daytime only until August 23, 2009, when translator W282AX was added on 104.3 to add nighttime programming and a wider signal range.

For the 2009 season, Gaffney High School sports moved from WOLT to WZZQ's FM translator.

WZZQ began broadcasting pre-game coverage of the football games of the Limestone College Saints during their debut season in 2014. WZZQ also airs broadcasts of "Saints Live!" relating to Limestone sports from Limestone's campus and Fatz Cafe in Gaffney. The program often features interviews with student athletes from Limestone.

On July 6, 2015, WZZQ changed its format from country to adult hits, branded as "Gaffney's Hot FM".
