= WKQC =

Adult contemporary radio station in Charlotte, North Carolina

Coordinates: 35.252°N 80.686°W

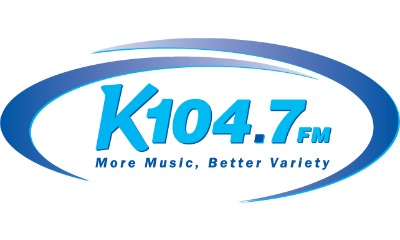
- Charlotte, North Carolina; United States
- Broadcast area: Charlotte metropolitan area
- Frequency: 104.7 MHz (HD Radio)
- Branding: K104.7

Programming
- Format: Adult Contemporary
- Subchannels: HD2: Sports radio (Fox Sports Radio); HD3: Playa (Tropical music)
- Affiliations: Compass Media Networks; Westwood One

Ownership
- Owner: Beasley Broadcast Group; (Beasley Media Group Licenses, LLC)
- Sister stations: WBAV-FM, WPEG, WSOC-FM

History
- First air date: May 22, 1960; 66 years ago
- Former call signs: WYFM (1960–1973); WEZC (1973–1989); WMXC (1989–1994); WSSS (1994–2003)
- Call sign meaning: Queen City (nickname for Charlotte)

Technical information
- Licensing authority: FCC
- Facility ID: 20338
- Class: C0
- ERP: 100,000 watts
- HAAT: 369 meters (1,211 ft)

Links
- Public license information: Public file; LMS
- Webcast: Listen live; Listen live (via Audacy); Listen live (via iHeartRadio)
- Website: k1047.com; foxsportsradiocharlotte.com (HD2)

WKQC (104.7 FM) is a commercial radio station in Charlotte, North Carolina. It is owned by the Beasley Broadcast Group and airs an Adult Contemporary music format. For most of November and December, it switches to all-Christmas music. WKQC's studios are located on South Boulevard in Charlotte.

WKQC has an effective radiated power (ERP) of 100,000 watts, the maximum for most FM stations in the U.S. The transmitter site is in East Charlotte, off Hood Road. It broadcasts in the HD Radio format. The HD2 digital subchannel carries sports radio programming from the Fox Sports Radio Network. The HD3 digital subchannel carries tropical music as "Playa 94.7".

The station receives co-channel interference from WNOK in Columbia, South Carolina, just 75 miles south of Charlotte. The Chester and Lancaster, South Carolina areas are affected the most with interference from both stations. Both WKQC and WNOK use directional antennas. Despite this, the stations' overlap causes listener problems in areas of Northern South Carolina, and closer to Charlotte on some summer days when tropospheric interference is strong.

== History ==
=== WIST-FM ===
In January 1948, an FM station on 104.7 MHz signed on as WIST-FM. The station was owned by Surety Broadcasting, which also owned WIS in Columbia, South Carolina. In 1953, WIST-FM went "dark" as The Broadcasting Company of the South chose to concentrate on its AM station on 930 kHz (now WYFQ), which signed on in 1951.

=== Beautiful music ===
On May 22, 1960, a new station came on the air on 104.7 as WYFM. In Fall 1970, WYFM added classical music each night from 6 P.M. to midnight because the music was not available anywhere else except recordings. Several months later the station changed back to its old format, with "popular music" from 9 A.M. to 10 P.M. with ten minutes of "semi-classical" and "classical" twice per hour, and "Concert Hour" and "Concerts for Connosseurs" after 10 each night. It was owned by Charlotte Broadcasting, Inc., and had a beautiful music format. By 1973, after EZ Communications bought the station, WYFM became WEZC (known by the moniker "EZ-104") and increased its power to 100,000 watts.

In September 1978, easy listening rival WBT-FM changed to album rock and became WBCY, leaving WEZC as the city's only beautiful music station. The easy format continued for 14 years, although over time, more vocals were added to the playlist and many instrumental songs were deleted.

=== Soft AC ===
In December 1982, even though the area had two other soft adult contemporary FM stations in WLVV and WZXI, WEZC changed to soft adult contemporary as well. Artists included Air Supply, Billy Joel, Sheena Easton, Simon & Garfunkel, Stevie Wonder, Carole King, The Beatles, James Taylor and Michael McDonald. The switch generated so many protests that WZXI moved to fill the gap. During the 1980s, WEZC gradually evolved from soft adult contemporary to mainstream adult contemporary. The station's most famous personality was controversial morning host Chuck Boozer.

In March 1989, WEZC completed its transition with a name and call letter change to WMXC, "Mix 104.7", and the WEZC call letters were picked up by the former WRLX at 102.9. The station originally wanted the call sign WMIX, but at the last minute found out those calls were already being used by a pair of stations in Mount Vernon, Illinois: WMIX AM and WMIX-FM. Furthermore, in a somewhat controversial move, for a time it referred to itself on-air as WMIX, with an announcer whispering its true calls hurriedly during hourly legal station identification. However, the use of WMIX as a brand was short-lived, as the owners of the WMIX stations in Mount Vernon, Withers Broadcasting, registered the "WMIX" branding as a registered trademark. WMXC would gain a sister station in 1992, when Cox Broadcasting sold WSOC-FM to EZ.

=== Classic hits ===
On September 2, 1994, with WBT-FM and WLYT (formerly the "new" WEZC) competing, WMXC became WSSS, "Star 104.7", playing "Super Sounds of the Seventies", which evolved to classic hits later in 1997. WSSS would gain 4 sister stations (WBAV, WBAV-FM, WNLV and WPEG) in December 1996 from Evergreen Media, which was part of a large multi-market swap (Evergreen received EZ Communications' Philadelphia stations WIOQ and WUSL in return). EZ would then be bought by American Radio Systems in July 1997. ARS would be bought out by Infinity Broadcasting on September 19, 1997, making WSSS a CBS O&O station (CBS owned Infinity).

In January 2000, WSSS added 1980s music to the playlist. The station later went all-1980s. WSSS shifted back to classic hits in 2002. But even though format changes generated brief ratings improvement, nothing worked until the station returned to adult contemporary music, with an emphasis on older songs. The switch to the current format came after stunting with Christmas music beginning on Halloween and continuing all through the 2003 holiday season.

=== Return to AC ===
Operations Manager John Reynolds, Market Manager Bill Schoening and AC Programming Consultant Gary Berkowitz designed the rebirth of the station. Plans were to rename the station "Cool 104.7". However, on December 23, 2003, just three days before the new format was scheduled to debut, CBS Radio's legal department notified the station that the word "Cool", when used as a noun, had been copyrighted by Clear Channel Communications. A $10,000 jingle package had to be scrapped and Program Director Tom Jeffries and PM Drive host T. Edward Bensen spent Christmas Day re-imaging the station with the quickly revised name of "K 104.7" so the debut could occur as scheduled the next morning.

Infinity changed its name to CBS Radio in December 2005 as part of the spin-off of CBS' motion picture and cable television assets under a relaunched Viacom.

WKQC also claims to be Charlotte's first eco-friendly station that boasts a promotions fleet of gas saving and flex fuel vehicles. To further promote this, WKQC changed their slogan for a time to "Be Cool, Go Green" and promotes a 'green' lifestyle by providing tips and partnering with local community campaigns in the Charlotte area.

=== Changes in personnel ===
In January 2007, Tom Jeffries, a former Boston-area programming legend who had been Program Director and Morning Host since the station's flip in 2004, resigned to go into semi-retirement. In April 2007, the station picked up local TV meteorologist Derek James as the new morning host, while promoting Scarlet C. to Assistant Program Director and T. Edward Bensen to Music Director.

The station abruptly eliminated its entire on-air staff in October 2008, with the only exception being Holly Haze from 7p.m.-midnight weekdays. Production Director Rick Scaffe and Promotions Director Leah Galloway, as well as sister WNKS Promotions Director Natalie Kirby and long time WSOC-FM newsman Frank Lassiter were also cut at the same time in what was called a cost-cutting move.

The station hired Charlotte radio veteran Jon Robinson to do mornings from 6am-12pm a few months later. On November 18, 2009, his name was abruptly removed from the station website, with no report as to why he was terminated. Later, Robinson revealed that he'd been arrested at the end of his shift one day in October for violating a protective order, and that he and station officials agreed to part ways at the end of his contract so he could focus on recovering from a long term substance abuse problem. By 2010, the station had hired an all-new air staff. In January 2012, WKQC changed its slogan from Charlotte's Cool Music Station to More Music, Better Variety.

=== Beasley ownership ===
On October 2, 2014, CBS Radio announced that it would trade all of their Tampa and Charlotte stations (including WKQC), as well as WIP in Philadelphia to the Beasley Broadcast Group in exchange for 5 stations located in Miami and Philadelphia. The swap was completed on December 1, 2014.

As of 2021, WKQC's playlist largely focused on uptempo music from the 1970s and 1980s, contrary to many mainstream adult contemporary stations in the United States. The station played songs traditionally not played on the format, including from the classic rock and yacht rock genres. The station's on-air imaging referred to the 1980s as the station's decade of focus, and avoided most "current" or "recurrent" adult contemporary songs. As radio programmer Sean Ross wrote for industry trade publication RadioInsight, "WKQC has been able to double as the Classic Hits station for the market for 20 years ... The positioning [of WKQC] ("More Hits, Better Variety") is AC. There was still a recurrent and two '00s songs in the hour I heard, but K104.7 essentially shares Classic Hits with Adult Hits WLKO." In a 2023 interview, program director and midday DJ Jack Daniel said, "We're kind of an adult contemporary/classic hits station. Our station is not trying to make hits, we're just playing the hits."

On May 17, 2021, WKQC became the new flagship of The Bob and Sheri Show, which was dropped by WLNK the previous month. Due to the COVID-19 pandemic, the pair were broadcasting the show from home, but Beasley was expected to move the show, owned by Now! Media, to its studios. Incumbent morning hosts Phil Harris and Melany Myers moved to afternoons, Jack Daniel moved from afternoons to middays, and Myers dropped her midday host duties. Bob Lacey announced he would retire at the end of January 2025 and spend more time with his family.

In May 2024, Harris and Myers were let go, and were replaced by Ace & TJ.

On August 3, 2026, Beasley Media Group announced that with the sale of WNKS, The Maney & LauRen Morning Show would migrate to WKQC to continue broadcasting in the Charlotte market; this, in turn, led to the terrestrial cancellation of Bob and Sheri (Bob had already retired from the show a year prior).

== Christmas Music ==
WKQC calls itself "Christmas K-104.7" when it shifts to its all-Christmas format. The station also uses holiday-themed jingles. Initially, it aired the all-Christmas format only on weekends leading up to Thanksgiving, with a mix of regular and Christmas songs on the weekdays. On the week of Thanksgiving, the all-Christmas format began running on a full-time basis, as of Christmas 2008. The station bills itself as the Carolinas' radio home for the holidays, a title that WLYT once held exclusively until 2004, when both stations started going head-to-head. From 2012 to 2020, WKQC was the exclusive Christmas music station for Charlotte, thanks to WLYT's format flip to adult hits and rebranding to WLKO ("102.9 The Lake"). In 2021 WLKO also began running the all-Christmas format.

In recent years, WKQC has flipped to all-Christmas music a week or two leading up to Thanksgiving.
