= WPZS =

- Charlotte, North Carolina; United States
- Broadcast area: Metrolina
- Frequency: 610 kHz
- Branding: Praise 102.5 FM 610 AM

Programming
- Format: Urban gospel

Ownership
- Owner: Urban One; (Radio One of North Carolina, LLC)
- Sister stations: WBT; WBT-FM; WFNZ-FM; WOSF

History
- First air date: 1941
- Former call signs: WAYS (1941–1984); WROQ (1984–1986); WAES (1986–1990); WROQ (1990–1991); WGKL (1991); WAQS (1991–1994); WRFX (1994–1995); WFNZ (1995–2025)
- Call sign meaning: "Praise"

Technical information
- Licensing authority: FCC
- Facility ID: 53974
- Class: B
- Power: 5,000 watts (day); 1,000 watts (night)
- Transmitter coordinates: 35°18′3.5″N 80°53′17.26″W
- Translators: 102.5 W273DA (Charlotte, relays WOSF-HD2)
- Repeaters: (105.3-2) WOSF-HD2 (Gaffney, South Carolina); (107.9-2) WBT-FM-HD2 (Charlotte, North Carolina)

Links
- Public license information: Public file; LMS
- Webcast: Listen live
- Website: praisecharlotte.com

WPZS (610 kHz), known on air as "Praise 102.5 FM 610 AM", is a commercial urban gospel formatted AM radio station in Charlotte, North Carolina. Owned by Urban One, its studios and offices are at 1 Julian Price Place.

WPZS uses a directional antenna and transmits with 5,000 watts by day. At night, it reduces power to 1,000 watts, sending most of its signal to the east, to avoid interfering with other stations on AM 610 and adjacent frequencies. The transmitter is at the site of its former studios on Radio Road in the Oakdale neighborhood of Northwest Charlotte. Programming is also heard on 200-watt FM translator W273DA at 102.5 MHz. That translator is fed by the HD2 subchannel of sister station WOSF (105.3 FM).

== History ==
=== WAYS ===
The station first signed on in 1941 as WAYS. It was one of only three radio stations in Charlotte, and it was powered at 1,000 watts around the clock. WAYS was owned by the Inter-City Advertising Company and was an affiliate of the NBC Blue Network and the Mutual Broadcasting System.

During one of the polio epidemics of the late 1940s, WAYS provided family programming for children who had to stay at home.

By the 1950s, WAYS increased its daytime power to 5,000 watts, using a directional antenna at night.

=== Top 40 ===
By the 1960s, WAYS was Charlotte's lowest-rated station. Its studios were in such bad shape, cats were needed to control the rodents. Stan and Sis Kaplan of Boston bought WAYS in May 1965 for $550,000. Beginning in June of that year, "61 New Ways" and later "61 Big Ways" aired an energetic Top 40 format which was considered by older residents to be "an alien sound in the Carolinas". It went to number one, surpassing longtime leader WBT, eventually becoming one of the highest-rated Top 40 stations in the country.

One reason was the Treasure Hunt, where people had to listen to clues from "Mr. Treasure" (Jack Gale) telling them how to find a $1,000 coupon. News director C. Michael Blackwell would interview winners. Personalities included John Kilgo, Jack Pride, Tom Kinard, Jack Armstrong, Pete Ray of "The Pete Ray-D-O Show", Dick Blanchard, and Long John Silver. WAYS jocks who went on to greater fame included Morton Downey Jr., actor Jay Thomas, and Robert Murphy (who had success in Chicago). Eventually, the morning show was simulcast on both WAYS and sister FM WROQ. Larry Sprinkle, now a WCNC-TV morning weather personality, also worked at the stations. They were known for lampooning The PTL Club with Bill Taker of the Pass the Loot Club.

=== Talk radio and oldies ===
However, due to rising popularity of music on FM radio, ratings for the station dropped, and on September 6, 1982, WAYS changed formats to a hybrid news talk/adult contemporary format. WAYS would continue to simulcast Murphy's morning show, but much of the programming would come from ABC Talkradio. WAYS was one of 24 affiliates carrying programming from KABC and KGO such as Michael Jackson, Dr. Irene Kassoria, Dr. Toni Grant and Owen Spann. John Kilgo's "Inside Sports" continued from 6 to 8 pm. The ratings continued to slide.

On August 20, 1984, the station switched its call sign to WROQ and flipped back to Top 40. It simulcast its sister station WROQ-FM in morning and afternoon drive times, while airing automated music in other time periods. In June 1986, it changed its calls to WAES (a phonetic version of the old call letters). Along with the new call sign came a brief return to its old "61 Big WAYS" moniker. Also, in September of that year, the Kaplans sold the stations for $13 million to CRB Broadcasting, which would then sell them to Adams Radio in July 1988, then to Tenore Broadcasting in March 1989.

=== Adult standards and Z-Rock ===
However, WAES failed to make much headway in the ratings, despite playing many of the songs it played in its heyday via the satellite delivered Oldies Channel format. After 18 months, on June 27, 1988, WAES began airing the "AM Only" adult standards satellite format during the day, and talk show hosts Bruce Williams, Neil Myers and Larry King at night.

The station brought back the WROQ call letters on January 18, 1990. It began playing heavy metal rock, flipping to the Z-Rock network, and rebranded as "Q61". The hard rock format only lasted a year.

=== Back to oldies ===
On January 18, 1991, 610 AM became WGKL, and reverted to oldies after Adams Radio re-acquired the two stations. WGKL aired the "Kool Gold" satellite format, while the FM aired its sister network "Pure Gold".

In October of that year, the station became WAQS (another phonetic play on its old calls) while keeping the oldies format. The flip to oldies was part of a company-wide initiative where most of Adams' AM stations flipped to the format. However, this resulted in the bankruptcy of the company, with their stations being placed in receivership and being sold off one by one.

=== Sports talk ===
On August 31, 1992, 610 AM became Charlotte's first all-sports station as "Sports 610 AM WAQS". Gerry Vaillancourt, formerly of WCNT, was the station's first local sports talk host, debuting on September 14. Another local host was Michele Tafoya, who was then known on-air as Mickey Conley.

In March 1993, AT&T temporarily acquired WAQS and its FM sister station, WAQQ, while a permanent owner was being sought. Pyramid Broadcasting, then-owners of WRFX, bought the stations in September 1993, and WAQS became known as WRFX. It began using the moniker "Fox 610 Sports" in May 1994. Pyramid merged with Evergreen Media in July 1995, resulting in WRFX-FM being spun off to SFX Broadcasting, and AM 610 going to Evergreen.

=== WFNZ ===
WRFX switched its call letters to WFNZ, on November 20, 1995, with the slogan "Where Fans Rule". In December 1996, WFNZ (and Evergreen's four other Charlotte stations) were swapped to EZ Communications (Evergreen would receive EZ's Philadelphia stations WIOQ and WUSL in return). American Radio Systems (ARS) acquired EZ Communications in July 1997, followed by Infinity Broadcasting's acquisition of ARS in September. Infinity was renamed to CBS Radio in December 2005.

On April 1, 1996, Vaillancourt moved to WBT. One reason was that at WFNZ, he would have had to give up his role in Charlotte Hornets broadcasts.

In 2003, WFNZ added a semi-satellite, WFNA, on 1660 AM after the Federal Communications Commission (FCC) expanded the AM radio band. It replaced Infinity-owned gospel station WGIV (1600 AM), which left the air. (The WGIV call letters are now on a different station in the Charlotte area, under different ownership.) The two stations, known as "The Franchise", simulcast on weekdays and had separate schedules during nights and weekends. The station on 1660 AM, as WJBX, was deleted in 2022.

From 2006 to 2012, WFNZ was the Charlotte-area home of North Carolina Tar Heels football and basketball, previously heard on WBT. WBT sales director Steve Sklenar said the games pre-empted John Hancock's show and, during the ACC Tournament, Rush Limbaugh. WBT wanted the games, Sklenar said, because its powerful 50,000-watt signal brought the Tar Heels to most of the East Coast at night. However, the pre-emptions cost the station a lot of money. In contrast, WFNZ could use WFNA to air Charlotte 49ers basketball even when there was a conflict.

=== Strong signal ===
For many years, WFNZ boasted the second-strongest signal in the Charlotte area, at 5,000 watts (which is stronger at 610 AM than it would be on a higher frequency). However, WCRU and sister WBCN (formerly WFNA) operated at 10,000 watts. During the day, it provides at least grade B coverage to 35 counties in North and South Carolina. However, it must power down to 1,000 watts at night due to a large glut of clear-channel stations on nearby channels. This makes WFNZ hard to hear even in some parts of Mecklenburg County and all but unlistenable in much of the South Carolina portion of the market. Due to its nighttime signal limitations, UNC signed up WFNZ's former FM sister WRFX to simulcast Tar Heel basketball games from 2008 to 2011, as well as any football games kicking off after 5 pm. WNOW-FM took over this duty for the 2011–12 season, after which the Tar Heels moved back to WBT full-time.

Shortly after WBCN broke off from WFNZ, two of the other stations in CBS Radio's Charlotte cluster, WPEG and WBAV, added WFNZ to their digital subcarriers to improve WFNZ's nighttime signal.

WFNZ ran a tailgate prior to Carolina Panthers home games at the station's "Doghouse" located near Bank of America Stadium.

In November 2007, the station went through a scheduling change when the station lost its syndication of "The Bill Rosinski Show" after the Charis Radio Network cancelled the show. Instead of picking up syndication from Sporting News Radio or ESPN Radio, the station added a one-hour show featuring Chuck Howard and added an hour to the "Mac Attack" show. On October 1, 2008, Howard announced that he was leaving the station to become the producer for NASCAR Media Group. A new show featuring former Carolina Panthers players Frank Garcia and Brentson Buckner began airing on October 6, 2008.

=== 610 The Fan ===
On September 14, 2009, WFNZ changed its branding from "The Franchise" to "The Fan", moving in some ESPN Radio programming from 1660 AM and dropping Sporting News Radio programming. WBCN, formerly WFNA, broke from the simulcast and flipped to a talk radio format as "America's Talk 1660".

November 24, 2010, was the last day for Mark Packer, host of the station's most popular show "Primetime with the Packman", and a WFNZ host for 13 years. His show was syndicated to 14 stations in markets that included Raleigh, Greensboro and Charleston. Though Packer, son of Billy Packer, continued his "Southern Fried Football" and "Packman on Sports" on the WJZY 10:00 newscast, he would be off Charlotte radio due to a non-compete clause until July 2011.

On August 8, 2011, WZGV took over ESPN Radio programming from WFNZ, which aired the network mostly at night. Fox Sports Radio would be used for night and weekend slots.

May 14, 2014, was the last day for Marc James, host of "The Drive with Marc James". He announced it on the air and on Twitter.

=== Beasley and Entercom ownership ===
On October 2, 2014, CBS Radio announced that it would trade all of its Tampa and Charlotte stations (including WFNZ), as well as WIP (AM) in Philadelphia to the Beasley Broadcast Group in exchange for five stations located in Miami and Philadelphia. The swap was completed on December 1, 2014.

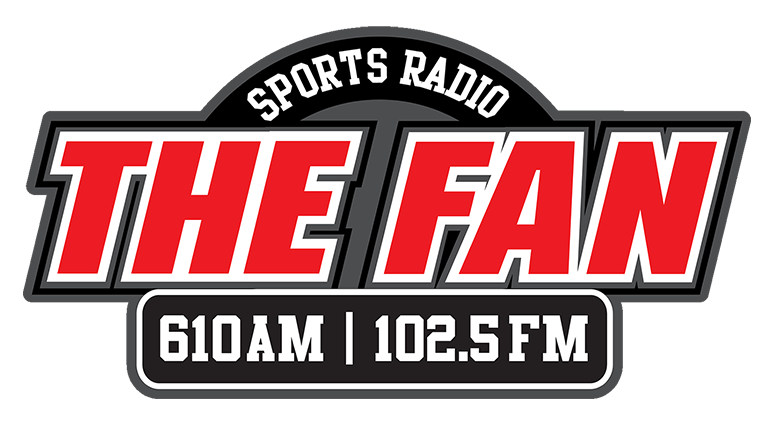
Former logo as "The Fan" with 102.5 FM

On July 25, 2016, WFNZ added a translator at 102.5 FM.

On October 18, 2016, Beasley announced that WFNZ and its FM translator would be sold to Entercom, pending FCC approval. The move followed Beasley's acquisition of Greater Media, which locally owned WBT, WBT-FM, and WLNK. Those stations were to be spun off to a divestiture trust to stay under ownership limits, but were also sold to Entercom as well. Upon the completion of the Greater Media-Beasley merger on November 1, Entercom began operating the stations via a time brokerage agreement, which lasted until the sale was consummated on January 10, 2017.

=== Sale to Urban One ===
On November 5, 2020, Urban One agreed to a station swap with Entercom involving four stations in Philadelphia, St. Louis and Washington, D.C. to Entercom in exchange for their cluster of Charlotte stations, including WFNZ. As part of the terms of the deal, Urban One took over operations via a local marketing agreement on November 23. The swap was consummated on April 20, 2021.

With the Urban One acquisition, WFNZ offered local sports hosts weekdays from 6 a.m. to 7 pm. On nights and weekends, it carried programming from CBS Sports Radio. WFNZ served as the flagship station for the NBA'S Charlotte Hornets and Major League Soccer's Charlotte FC.

In January 2022, MLS expansion team Charlotte FC announced a radio partnership with Radio One that made WFNZ the team's radio flagship. Since the Hornets had priority on WFNZ, when both teams were playing at the same time, the Charlotte FC broadcast moved to sister station WBT.

=== Urban contemporary ===
Logo used while simulcasting with WFNZ-FM 92.7

WFNZ programming was dropped from the 102.5 translator on February 28, 2022. The translator flipped to an urban contemporary-hip hop format, "102.5 The Block", carried through the HD2 channel of WOSF. Following a transition period, sister station WFNZ-FM 92.7, which (as WQNC) had served as the previous outlet for "The Block", became the new FM simulcast of WFNZ.

After 30 years of broadcasting the sports format on AM, WFNZ split from its FM simulcast at midnight EST on September 19, 2022, and began simulcasting "102.5 The Block". DJ Ace, formerly of WQNC, joined the station as afternoon host on November 14.

=== Urban gospel ===
On December 11, 2025, a series of changes began that includes the urban gospel "Praise" format moving from 100.9 to WFNZ (AM) at 610 AM, which became WPZS, and W273DA at 102.5, and also to the HD-2 channel of WOSF.

== Notable staff ==
=== DJs ===
- Jay Thomas

=== Former talk hosts ===
- Morton Downey Jr.

=== Former sports talk hosts ===
- Brentson Buckner
- Steve Czaban
- Frank Garcia: Co-host of "Bustin' Loose With Frank Garcia
- Muhsin Muhammad
- Bill Rosinski
