= WFNZ-FM =

Radio station in Harrisburg–Charlotte, North Carolina, United States

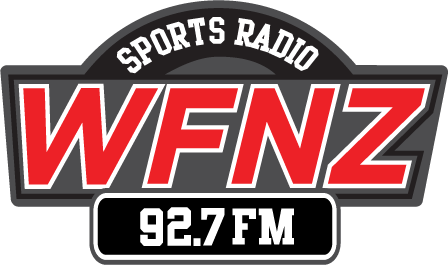
- Harrisburg, North Carolina; United States
- Broadcast area: Metrolina
- Frequency: 92.7 MHz
- Branding: Sportsradio 92.7 WFNZ

Programming
- Format: Sports radio
- Affiliations: ESPN Radio; Sports USA Radio Network; Charlotte FC; Charlotte Hornets

Ownership
- Owner: Urban One; (Radio One of North Carolina, LLC)
- Sister stations: WBT; WBT-FM; WOSF; WPZS

History
- First air date: January 1995; 31 years ago
- Former call signs: WCCJ (1994–2001); WCHH (2001–2004); WQNC (2004–2012); WPZS (2012–2015); WQNC (2015–2022)
- Call sign meaning: "Fans"

Technical information
- Licensing authority: FCC
- Facility ID: 28898
- Class: C3
- ERP: 10,500 watts
- HAAT: 154 meters (505 ft)
- Transmitter coordinates: 35°16′20.5″N 80°45′53.3″W
- Repeater: 107.9 WBT-HD3 (Charlotte)

Links
- Public license information: Public file; LMS
- Webcast: Listen live
- Website: wfnz.com

WFNZ-FM (92.7 MHz) is a sports radio station in Charlotte, North Carolina, owned and operated by Radio One. The station's studios are located at 1 Julian Price Place just off Morehead Street in Charlotte, and its transmitter site is in Charlotte's Newell South neighborhood.

WFNZ-FM is the Charlotte affiliate of ESPN Radio, carrying network programming on nights and weekends. It airs local sports hosts weekdays from 6 a.m. to 7 p.m. WFNZ serves as the flagship station for the NBA's Charlotte Hornets and Major League Soccer's Charlotte FC. Whenever there is a conflict, Charlotte FC matches air on sister stations WBT AM-FM.

== History ==
The station signed on as WCCJ in late January 1995 with a commercial-free free-form rock format. Due to low advertising rates, in June 1995, the station changed to smooth jazz, and would flip again to rhythmic oldies as "92.7 the Jam" on August 22, 1999.

As a result of the decline of rhythmic oldies nationally, on April 2, 2001, WCCJ flipped to mainstream urban as Hot 92.7, with new call letters WCHH, taking on urban/hip hop station WPEG. It did well in the ratings at first, knocking heritage station WPEG down to 6th place in the market, but later declined, so it was flipped to urban AC on January 21, 2004, as "Q92.7", along with a call letter change to WQNC. WQNC took over Tom Joyner's show from longer standing urban AC rival WBAV-FM soon after that. WBAV subsequently answered back by signing on as an affiliate for a new syndicated show hosted by Joyner's rival, Steve Harvey.

My 92.7 ident used until 2012.

On May 15, 2008, WQNC added two talk shows: the New York City based "Keeping It Real with Rev. Al Sharpton", and the "Warren Ballentine Show".

In October 2009, WQNC rebranded as "My 92.7", changed to a more contemporary format, dropping the talk show hosts other than Joyner, and adding energetic music from such artists as Usher, Patti LaBelle and Whitney Houston. The slogan was "R&B from the 80s, 90s, and Now", although some 70s disco/soul/R&B songs remained on the playlist.

On August 31, 2011, Radio One announced its intention to sell off their Charlotte stations to Davis Broadcasting, but in April 2012, the deal fell through, and Radio One decided to keep the stations.

On August 27, 2012, WQNC began directing listeners on air and online to sister station WNOW-FM. Imaging teased that something 'inspirational' was coming. Two weeks later, on September 13, WQNC began simulcasting sister WPZS and switched call letters with that station. The two stations provided a strong combined signal with 60 percent overlap.

WPZS increased power to 10.5 kW and height to 154 meters. Construction was completed in October 2013.

On August 14, 2015, 92.7 began stunting with all-Drake as "Drake 92.7", promoting a new format to come the following Monday, August 17, at 5 pm. Along with this, 92.7 reverted to its previous call sign of WQNC, with 100.9 retaining the gospel format and the WPZS call letters. At the promised time, WQNC flipped back to urban as "92.7 The Block", taking direct aim at WPEG (as well as WGIV/W277CB).

"The Block" was moved to the HD2 channel of WOSF, as well as translator station W273DA (102.5 FM), on February 28, 2022; following a transition period, 92.7 became an FM simulcast of WFNZ on March 1, a role previously served by the 102.5 facility. Ahead of the swap, on February 16, WQNC changed its call letters to WFNZ-FM. The simulcast served mainly to fill in the gaps in the AM station's nighttime signal. WFNZ must reduce power from 5,000 watts to 1,000 watts at sunset, making it hard to hear even in some parts of Charlotte and rendering it all but unlistenable in much of the South Carolina portion of the market. At midnight on September 19, 2022, WFNZ split from simulcasting with WFNZ-FM and joined WOSF-HD2 and W273DA in carrying "The Block".

On September 4, 2025, WFNZ-FM switched affiliations from Infinity Sports Network to ESPN Radio.
