= Killer Beaz =

American stand-up comedian

- Born: Truett S. Beasley Jr. 1953 (age 72–73); Andalusia, Alabama, U.S.

Comedy career
- Years active: 1982–present
- Medium: Stand-up, radio, television
- Genres: Observational, country comedy
- Subjects: Culture of the Southern United States, everyday life, family
- Website: killerbeaz.com

Truett S. Beasley Jr. (born 1953), better known by his stage name Killer Beaz, is an American stand-up comedian. He has a strong southern accent and a strong following in the southern United States.

== Life and career ==
Beasley was born to Truett S. Beasley and Gwen Norman Beasley in Andalusia, Alabama in 1953. Beasley's father was a Korean War veteran and captain with the Jackson, Mississippi Police Department, as well as a licensed funeral director and embalmer. His mother was a public school teacher. He graduated from Wingfield High School in 1972, where he was voted the "wittiest" of the class. During his adolescence, he worked as an ambulance technician and at a funeral home. He began his career as a musician, playing guitar in a blues band. He received his stage name from an audience member who declared a guitar lick to be, "Killer, Beaz!" He first performed in 1982 when a bar owner requested a comedian perform. With no real outlets for comedy in his home state, he spent time opening for musical groups and at pool halls. After seeing comedian Jay Leno perform in Chicago in the early 1980s, he had an "epiphany" and relocated to Nashville, where he was embraced for his strong accent.

As his career developed, he made hundreds of appearances on The Nashville Network and CMT. He appeared on over 100 television programs and is known for the catchphrase "save up." On the 1996 album NASCAR: Hotter Than Asphalt, Killer Beaz recorded a song called "Save Up" backed up by Lynyrd Skynyrd. His parents were both killed in 2005 by a drunk driver driving a semi-trailer truck. The incident left him unwilling to perform for over a year, and he went into a period of "semi-retirement." He was briefly a part of the WQYK Morning Show in Tampa, Florida in 2009.

His first major-label comedy album, Don’t Ever Touch Anybody You Don’t Know, was released in 2013 on Jack Records, an imprint of Warner Bros. Records.

Beasley has also appeared on numerous episodes of the television series Moonshiners, alongside friends Mark and Digger.

== Personal life ==
Beasley and his wife relocated to Mobile, Alabama when they had children.

== Discography ==
- Save Up! (2000)
- Shaken, Not Stirred (2002)
- Original Artist Hit List (2003)
- Don’t Ever Touch Anybody You Don’t Know (2013)
