= WBCN (North Carolina) =

Radio station in Charlotte, North Carolina (2003–2020)

- Charlotte, North Carolina; United States
- Broadcast area: Charlotte metropolitan area
- Frequency: 1660 kHz

Programming
- Format: Sports

Ownership
- Owner: Beasley Broadcast Group; (Beasley Media Group Licenses, LLC)

History
- First air date: December 2003
- Last air date: December 31, 2020
- Former call signs: WBHE (1998–2003); WFNA (2003–2009); WBMX (2009); WBCN (2009–2021); WJBX (2021–2022)
- Call sign meaning: "Boston Concert Network". Call sign was parked from its heritage use at 104.1 FM in Boston

Technical information
- Facility ID: 87037
- Class: B
- Power: 10,000 watts day; 1,000 watts night
- Transmitter coordinates: 35°14′56″N 80°51′44″W

WBCN (1660 AM) was the call sign assigned from 2009 until 2021, and the last call sign used on the air, for radio station WJBX in Charlotte, North Carolina, United States. The station, while silent, was assigned the call letters WJBX by the Federal Communications Commission on February 5, 2021. The license was deleted on August 24, 2022, before any broadcasts under the WJBX call letters.

The station was last owned by Beasley Broadcast Group, with studios located on South Boulevard in Charlotte's South End, and a transmitter site off Mattoon Street in West Charlotte. As WBCN, it last broadcast a sports radio format known as "Fox Sports Charlotte", which was simulcast on the third HD Radio channel (HD3) of WSOC-FM 103.7, as well as FM translator station 94.7 W234BY.

Originally authorized as the expanded band facility for WGIV (1600 AM), the station operated from 2003 to 2020. It programmed a sports format for most of its history, initially as WFNA, the second frequency for WFNZ (610 AM). It became WBCN in 2009, after the call sign was moved from a sister station in Boston; during this period, the station pivoted to conservative talk until 2013 and again from 2015 to 2017, and to classic rock from 2017 until 2019, interspersed with stints as Charlotte's outlet for CBS Sports Radio and Fox Sports Radio. WBCN ceased broadcasting on December 31, 2020, due to the sale of the transmitter site for residential development. The translator station continued airing "Fox Sports Charlotte" on 94.7 FM, fed by the HD3 subchannel of WSOC-FM.

== History ==
The station originated as the expanded band "twin" of an existing station on the standard AM band. On March 17, 1997, the FCC announced that eighty-eight stations had been given permission to move to newly available "Expanded Band" transmitting frequencies, ranging from 1610 to 1700 kHz, with WGIV (1600 AM) in Charlotte authorized to move to 1660 kHz.

A construction permit for the expanded band station was assigned the call letters WBHE on September 4, 1998. The FCC's initial policy was that both the original station and its expanded band counterpart could operate simultaneously for up to five years, after which owners would have to turn in one of the two licenses, depending on whether they preferred the new assignment or elected to remain on the original frequency, although this deadline was extended multiple times. On June 2, 2004, the license for the original standard AM band station on 1600 kHz, WGIV, was formally deleted.

Programming on the expanded band station, which changed its call letters to WFNA on December 9, 2003, rather than supplementing WGIV's programming, was instead paired with a co-owned sports outlet station, WFNZ (610 AM). WFNA first signed on in December 2003 to help improve WFNZ's coverage, airing some of that station's programming. WFNZ must power down to 1,000 watts at night, rendering it all but unlistenable in some parts of the Charlotte radio market.

The station was switched its call sign to WBMX on July 29, 2009. A few weeks later, on August 12, it again switched its call letters to WBCN. The assignment of the WBMX and WBCN call letters came as CBS Radio prepared for a radio station shuffle in Boston. WBCN, Boston's longtime rock station, was set to move to a digital-only platform, while WBMX was moving to WBCN's old frequency at 104.1 FM. This swap was being made to create a new Boston sports radio station at 98.5 FM. On August 5, 2009, Mix 98.5 in Boston switched its callsign from WBMX-FM to WBZ-FM. The WBMX call sign was parked in Charlotte, while WBCN aired for its final days. Shortly after midnight on August 12, 2009, WBCN signed off, and the WBCN and WBMX calls were switched to complete the process.

According to The Charlotte Observer, CBS decided to park the WBCN call letters in Charlotte to keep another Boston station from picking them up and trading on the station's 51-year heritage in Boston (including 41 years as a rock station). Bill Schoening, CBS Radio manager for Charlotte, said, "It's very common in the business. It was a major signal with call letters that still have value and heritage."

=== Switch to talk ===
On September 14, 2009, WBCN became "America's Talk", a conservative talk radio station featuring syndicated hosts Michael Smerconish, Melanie Morgan, Jason Lewis, Glenn Beck, Sean Hannity, Laura Ingraham, John Gibson and Phil Hendrie. The target audience was primarily male and ages 25 to 54. Operations manager DJ Stout said, "We feel that Charlotte has never really had an alternative when it comes to news talk." Jason Lewis, a former host at WBT (1110 AM), said, "I think it'll be the stiffest competition WBT has seen in a while." Local newscasts each hour were produced jointly with local TV station WCNC-TV. Lewis moved back to WBT in 2011.

=== Switch to CBS Sports ===
On June 21, 2012, Mark Washburn of The Charlotte Observer reported that, starting in 2013, WBCN would be one of the charter affiliates of the new CBS Sports Radio network and would carry that network's programming throughout the day. WBCN began airing network programming on January 2, 2013. It also aired any Wake Forest or Davidson basketball games that conflicted with Charlotte Hornets games on WFNZ.

On October 2, 2014, CBS Radio announced that it would trade all of its Tampa and Charlotte stations, including WBCN, as well as WIP in Philadelphia to the Beasley Broadcast Group in exchange for five stations located in Miami and Philadelphia. The swap was completed on December 1, 2014.

On September 8, 2015, WBCN changed back to conservative talk, branded as "America's Pulse 1660".

=== Switch to "Smoke" ===
On June 19, 2017, at 6 a.m., WBCN flipped formats to classic rock, branded as "94.7 Smoke", and began relaying on translator W234BY (94.7 FM). The station aired an original playlist, focused on Southern classic rock artists including Lynyrd Skynyrd, ZZ Top, The Allman Brothers and Tom Petty, as well as local artists, and some Southern country tracks.

WBCN competed with iHeartMedia's longtime classic rock outlet WRFX. While WBCN was also heard on FM through a 250-watt translator station, WRFX's effective radiated power is 84,000 watts.

=== Switch to Fox Sports ===
On February 4, 2019, the station returned to a sports format, now with an affiliation with Fox Sports Radio.

=== Station goes dark ===
On December 31, 2020, WBCN went silent. The "Fox Sports Charlotte" sports format continued on W234BY 94.7 FM and WSOC-FM HD3. On February 5, 2021, the call sign of the still silent station was changed to WJBX in a swap with a radio station near Fort Myers, Florida. WJBX's license was cancelled on August 24, 2022.
