= WBAV-FM =

Coordinates: 35.233°N 81.276°W

- Gastonia, North Carolina; United States
- Broadcast area: Charlotte metropolitan area
- Frequency: 101.9 MHz (HD Radio)
- Branding: V 101.9

Programming
- Format: Urban adult contemporary
- Subchannels: HD2: Sports; HD3: Tropical music
- Affiliations: Compass Media Networks; Premiere Networks

Ownership
- Owner: Beasley Broadcast Group; (Beasley Media Group Licenses, LLC)
- Sister stations: WKQC; WPEG; WSOC-FM

History
- First air date: September 1947
- Former call signs: WGNC-FM (1947–1978); WZXI (1978–1987); WLIT (1987–1988); WCKZ (1988–1994)
- Call sign meaning: Best Adult Variety

Technical information
- Licensing authority: FCC
- Facility ID: 6587
- Class: C0
- ERP: 100,000 watts
- HAAT: 301 meters (988 ft)

Links
- Public license information: Public file; LMS
- Webcast: Listen live
- Website: v1019.com; HD2: foxsportsradiocharlotte.com

WBAV-FM (101.9 FM, "V 101.9") is a commercial radio station licensed to Gastonia, North Carolina, United States, and serving the Charlotte metropolitan area. Owned by the Beasley Broadcast Group, it carries an urban adult contemporary format, with studios on South Boulevard in Charlotte's South End.

WBAV-FM's transmitter is sited on Crowder's Mountain, along McSwain Groves Road in Gastonia. The station broadcasts in HD Radio; it carries sports from Fox Sports Radio on the HD-2 subchannel and tropical music on the HD-3 subchannel.

== History ==
The station signed on the air in September 1947. The original call sign was WGNC-FM and it had a power of 11,100 watts. It was locally owned by the McSwain Family. WGNC-FM was a full simulcast of co-owned WGNC (1450 AM). The stations normally ran a broadcast day of 5:00 a.m. to 12:00 midnight until the late 1970s, when it began operating 24 hours daily. WGNC-AM-FM were network affiliates of ABC.

In 1976, WGNC-FM broke off from its AM sister station's programming and began airing a soft adult contemporary format. The call letters were changed to WZXI in 1978. The station was one of three soft AC stations in the Charlotte radio market. Protests over the programming change were launched by WEZC in December 1982. That led WZXI to change to beautiful music.

In 1987, WZXI became WLIT and later switched to a satellite-delivered middle of the road (MOR) format.

On January 22, 1988, shortly after Beasley Broadcasting bought the station, WLIT became WCKZ, better known as "Kiss 102". "Kiss" aired a "rhythmic contemporary hit radio" format (commonly known as "CHURban", a precursor to what is today rhythmic contemporary). Artists included Lionel Richie, Shalamar, Whitney Houston, Lisa Lisa, Phil Collins and Jody Watley. The station also increased its transmitter's power on Crowder's Mountain and moved its studio from Gastonia to Charlotte.

However, due to rival WPEG's increase in power, as well as increased competition from WAQQ, the station began falling in the ratings. That, along with financial troubles, resulted in the station filing for bankruptcy in 1992. In late 1993, Beasley announced it would sell WCKZ to Broadcasting Partners Inc. (BPI), which recently purchased WPEG. A local group, Citizens for Broadcasting in the Public Interest, started a petition to stop the sale, but the sale was approved in mid-January 1994. BPI decided to merge WCKZ's rhythmic format with WPEG in order to eliminate the competition between the two stations. (The "Kiss-FM" moniker, with a more Mainstream Top 40 format, was relaunched on 95.1 FM in May 1996.)

On January 25, 1994, at 2 p.m., WCKZ flipped to urban AC, branded as "V 101.9". New WBAV-FM call letters were adopted the day prior to the flip. The WBAV call letters were assigned on February 11 to co-owned station WGIV. Following a format change, the AM station returned to the WGIV call letters in May 1997.

Broadcasting Partners merged with Evergreen Media in May 1995. In December 1996, as part of a multi-market swap, WBAV-FM, along with Evergreen's four other Charlotte stations, were traded to EZ Communications (owners of WSOC-FM and WSSS. WRFX then went to SFX Broadcasting, with Evergreen receiving EZ Communications' Philadelphia stations WIOQ and WUSL in return. In July, EZ Communications was bought by American Radio Systems. ARS was bought out by Infinity Broadcasting on September 19, 1997. Infinity changed its name to CBS Radio in December 2005 as part of the spin-off of CBS' motion picture and cable television assets under a relaunched Viacom.

On January 22, 2004, WBAV-FM dropped the syndicated Tom Joyner morning show, which would move to WQNC. Joyner was replaced by The Steve Harvey Morning Show.

WBAV-FM was one of only three urban adult contemporary stations owned by CBS Radio, the other two being KTWV in Los Angeles and the now defunct WJBW/WNEW-FM/WUUB in West Palm Beach. Charlotte was also the only market where CBS Radio operated two full-powered urban stations, WBAV-FM and WPEG. On October 2, 2014, CBS Radio announced that it would trade all of the company's Tampa and Charlotte stations (including WBAV), as well as WIP in Philadelphia to the Beasley Broadcast Group in exchange for five stations located in Miami and Philadelphia. The swap was completed on December 1, 2014. The trade brought the 101.9 frequency back to its former owners for the first time since 1993.
