= WBT-FM =

Radio station in Charlotte, North Carolina

- Charlotte, North Carolina; United States
- Broadcast area: Charlotte metropolitan area
- Frequency: 107.9 MHz (HD Radio)
- Branding: News Talk 107.9 WBT

Programming
- Language: English
- Format: News/talk
- Subchannels: HD2: Urban gospel (WPZS simulcast); HD3: Sports radio (WFNZ-FM)
- Affiliations: Fox News Radio; Premiere Networks; Westwood One; WJZY; North Carolina Tar Heels

Ownership
- Owner: Urban One; (Radio One of North Carolina, LLC)
- Sister stations: WBT; WFNZ-FM; WOSF; WPZS

History
- First air date: August 15, 1962
- Former call signs: WBT-FM (1962–1978); WBCY (1978–1989); WBT-FM (1989–1995); WWSN (1995–1997); WLNK (1997–2025)

Technical information
- Licensing authority: FCC
- Facility ID: 30834
- Class: C
- ERP: 100,000 watts (analog); 10,000 watts (digital)
- HAAT: 516 meters (1,693 ft)
- Transmitter coordinates: 35°21′51.5″N 81°11′12.3″W

Links
- Public license information: Public file; LMS
- Webcast: Listen live
- Website: wbt.com

WBT-FM (107.9 MHz) is a commercial FM radio station licensed to serve Charlotte, North Carolina. The station is owned by Urban One and broadcasts a news/talk radio format. Its studios are located at One Julian Price Place on West Morehead Street, just west of Uptown Charlotte, and the station shares a broadcast tower with former television partner WBTV located near Dallas. WBT-FM broadcasts using HD Radio, and is a local primary station for the Emergency Alert System in the Charlotte Metropolitan Area.

== History ==
=== Original WBT-FM ===
The current WBT-FM is the second incarnation of a Charlotte station with the callsign WBT-FM. The original WBT-FM operated from 1947 to 1954 on 99.9 MHz as the first FM companion to WBT (1110 AM). Clyde McLean was the original announcer, and as consumer FM adoption was low at the time, the station mainly contracted with businesses in Charlotte to play background music for retailers and other businesses. With few advertisers and most of its listeners merely captive shoppers and workers, the station was considered surplus as WBT's owner, the Jefferson Standard Broadcasting Company, focused on providing resources to both WBT and its sister television station, CBS affiliate WBTV (channel 3). The station was closed down in 1954, with its former equipment donated to the University of North Carolina at Chapel Hill to start the first iteration of WUNC in the Research Triangle region. The 99.9 FM frequency would not be re-allocated to the Charlotte area, with Kannapolis-licensed WRKB-FM debuting on 99.7 in 1964.

=== WBT-FM ===
In 1962, Jefferson Standard Broadcasting Company returned to FM broadcasting, with a new WBT-FM, now on 107.9 MHz. This was one of the first FM stereo stations in the nation. Initially, the station aired a mixture of classical music and beautiful music, but by the mid-1960s, WBT-FM was airing the beautiful music format produced by Schulke Radio Productions.

=== WBCY ===
On August 31, 1978, at 6 pm, WBT-FM became "WBCY-108, Charlotte's Best Rock". According to an ad appearing in the September 1, 1978, edition of The Charlotte Observer, WBCY played 108 hours of music uninterrupted by commercials. Artists played included Chicago, Peter Frampton, The Rolling Stones, Carly Simon, Billy Joel, and Eddie Money. Popular announcers on the station during this time included John Lambis, Chris Jones, Alan Ryan, Becky Kent and Fred Story. Over the next 11 years, the station moved back and forth between adult-leaning contemporary hit radio and high-energy adult contemporary.

Also in 1978, Marty Lambert became Jeff Pilot, the traffic reporter for WBT and WBCY. Lambert became assistant program director and music director in 1982.

In the early 1980s, WBCY hired Johnny Ray Isley as morning host; the station later added Billy James as co-host. After John Boy accepted Jesus, he eventually decided he was being asked to play inappropriate songs, and he quit WBCY in February 1986. Bob Lacey, a veteran announcer for WBT and WBTV, replaced John Boy temporarily. Jim "Catfish" Prewitt also paired with Billy, who left the station in April. Later in 1986, Randy Cook and Spiff Dingle became the new morning hosts, while John Boy and Billy went to work for WRFX.

WBCY was also the home of popular Contemporary Christian music program, "Visions", hosted by Ken Mayfield. The program aired every Sunday morning from 1985 until 1993, when Mayfield left to manage WRCM.

When the North Carolina Tar Heels and the NBA Charlotte Hornets played at the same time, WBCY aired the Hornets.

In December 1988, Randy and Spiff were fired because WBCY intended to move toward "a more adult-oriented sound" under the new moniker "B108"; they became the morning hosts at WFOX in Atlanta. The change also cost DJ J.J. McKay his job, so McKay went to work for WCKZ; WBCY sought to enforce a noncompete clause, but it was ruled the contract that included the clause had expired before McKay was let go. Program director Mary June Rose hired Rob Early for the morning show in March 1989.

=== Sunny 107.9 ===
In November 1989, WBCY announced that Bob Lacey would be the station's morning host starting December 11. That same month, WBCY returned to the WBT-FM call letters and changed its format to mainstream adult contemporary under the moniker "Sunny 107.9". Sheri Lynch joined Lacey in February 1992, forming the current "Bob & Sheri" show, which began syndication in 1996 and is now heard on about 70 stations. Syndication of WLNK's programming was handled by Westwood One and later NOW! Media.

Eventually, the station's music began leaning in a top 40 direction again.

In 1995, Jefferson-Pilot purchased WBZK-FM, licensed to Chester, South Carolina, and flipped it to a simulcast of WBT to reach more listeners west of Charlotte at night due nighttime signal issues. As a result, the WBT-FM call letters went to that station, while 107.9 FM became WWSN. On August 23, 1996, the station changed its moniker to "Hits 107.9".

=== 107.9 the Link ===
On March 14, 1997, at 4 pm, after a brief stunt with construction sounds, the station flipped to modern adult contemporary, branded as "107.9 the Link". The WLNK call letters would be adopted the following day. The modern AC format lasted only a few years, and the station returned to a more mainstream sound, best described as "adult top 40".

Matt Harris and Ramona Holloway joined WLNK as afternoon hosts on March 19, 2001. They met in Columbus, Ohio, and worked in Virginia Beach, Virginia, before coming to Charlotte. After The Matt and Ramona Show became the top show with women ages 25-54, Matt & Ramona became nationally syndicated starting in 2004. The show won "Best Radio Show" in Charlotte Magazine several times.

That same year, Pam Stone began hosting a late morning talk show, as well as Craig Shoemaker in early afternoons, which meant WLNK was lifestyle talk during the day on weekdays with music at night and on weekends. Stone's show later moved to weekends before the station ended it. Kelly McKay took over middays in 2009 and departed in 2014. Followed by Kelly Meyers in the midday slot, she began in February 2015, and was let go in December 2019.

Lincoln Financial Group bought Jefferson-Pilot in 2006. The merged company retained Jefferson-Pilot's broadcasting division, renaming it Lincoln Financial Media. In January 2008, Lincoln Financial sold WLNK and WBT-AM-FM to Greater Media of Braintree, Massachusetts. Lincoln-Financial then sold its three television stations, including WBTV, to Raycom Media—thus breaking up Charlotte's last heritage radio/television cluster.

Starting with the 2015-16 season, WLNK aired any Tar Heels games that WBT couldn't air—for instance, whenever the Carolina Panthers were airing on WBT.

In July 2016, WLNK tweaked its format towards mainstream AC and changed their slogan to "Charlotte's Best Mix".

On July 19, 2016, Greater Media announced that they would merge with Beasley Media Group. Because Beasley is already maxed out in the Charlotte market with five FMs and two AMs, WLNK and WBT-AM-FM were spun off to a divestiture trust. On October 18, 2016, Entercom announced that they would purchase WLNK and WBT-AM-FM, plus WFNZ, pending FCC approval. Upon the completion of the Greater/Beasley merger on November 1, Entercom began operating the stations via a time brokerage agreement, which lasted until the sale was consummated on January 10, 2017.

On November 5, 2020, Urban One agreed to a station swap with Entercom in which they would swap ownership of four stations in Philadelphia, St. Louis and Washington, D.C. to Entercom in exchange for their cluster of Charlotte stations, including WLNK. As part of the terms of the deal, Urban One took over operations via a local marketing agreement on November 23. The swap was consummated on April 20, 2021.

=== Mix 107.9 ===
In April 2021, Urban One announced they would drop Bob and Sheri from WLNK. Lacey and Lynch's company, NOW! Media, which bought the show from Entercom in 2017, continued to distribute the show, and continued to air it on their nationwide affiliates. (The show was picked up locally by WKQC the following month. where it would remain until its cancellation in 2026.) In addition, Brent 'O'Brien' Harlan was let go as producer and third-mic of the "Matt & Ramona" show after 18 years at the station.

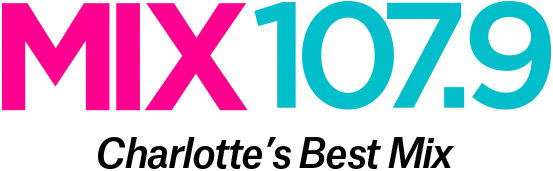
Former logo

On April 30, 2021, at 3 pm, after playing "Waiting on the World to Change" by John Mayer, WLNK relaunched as "Mix 107.9". The first song on "Mix" was "This Is How We Do It" by Montell Jordan. Matt & Ramona moved to mornings, with Drew Parham hosting middays, Madison James hosting afternoons with DJ Baby Yu on the mix at 5 pm, and Holly Haze hosting evenings. Martha Landess of Urban One described the format as an "upbeat mix of music from the '90s, 2000s and today".

As part of Major League Soccer expansion team Charlotte FC's deal with Urban One's Charlotte cluster, WLNK airs any Charlotte FC matches whenever both WFNZ-FM and WBT have a conflict. This first happened during Charlotte FC's inaugural home match, since WFNZ was airing a Charlotte Hornets game and WBT was airing a North Carolina Tar Heels basketball game.

=== WBT programming moves to FM ===
On December 11, 2025, WLNK flipped to a simulcast of WBT (AM), and the WBT-FM calls returned to 107.9 FM after 30 years. With this change, WLNK's hot AC format, "Mix" branding and callsign were moved to 100.9, and add a simulcast on WMXG. WBT and WBT-FM were simulcast until January 8, after which WBT began running a repeating message directing listeners to tune to 107.9 FM.

== See also ==
- List of three-letter broadcast call signs in the United States
