= WGIV =

Urban radio station in Pineville–Charlotte, North Carolina, United States

- Pineville, North Carolina; United States
- Broadcast area: Charlotte metropolitan area
- Frequency: 1370 kHz
- Branding: Streetz 103.3 & 100.5

Programming
- Format: Mainstream urban

Ownership
- Owner: Frank Neely; (RFPJY, LLC)
- Operator: Core Communications

History
- First air date: 1948
- Former call signs: WLTC (1948–2005)

Technical information
- Licensing authority: FCC
- Facility ID: 22027
- Class: D
- Power: 5,000 watts day; 67 watts night
- Transmitter coordinates: 35°13′4.5″N 80°53′35.3″W
- Translators: 100.5 W263CY (Charlotte); 103.3 W277CB (Charlotte)

Links
- Public license information: Public file; LMS
- Webcast: Listen live
- Website: streetz1033clt.com

WGIV (1370 kHz) is a commercial AM radio station licensed to Pineville, North Carolina, and serving the Charlotte metropolitan area. It airs an mainstream urban radio format. WGIV is owned by Frank Neely's RFPJY, LLC, but the station is operated by Steve Hedgwood's Core Communications, which owns a similar trimulcast in Atlanta of W233BF, WIPK and WFDR-FM.

By day, WGIV is powered at 5,000 watts. To protect other stations on 1370 AM, it reduces power at night to 67 watts. WGIV is simulcast on FM translators W277CB at 103.3 MHz and W263CY at 100.5 MHz, both of which are licensed to Charlotte.

== History ==
This is the second local station to use the WGIV call letters; the original WGIV (1600 AM) was the first station in the Charlotte radio market to target the African-American audience full time.

The current incarnation of WGIV started as daytimer WLTC in the late 1940s, and was licensed to serve Gastonia. For the majority of the station's existence, WLTC aired country music and Southern gospel. A midday gospel show was hosted by Tillie Lowery. After 25 years of hosting the program, Lowery retired in 1995.

In the late 1980s, WLTC was acquired by Ford Broadcasting in China Grove. The format would go full-time Southern gospel.

In 1998, Ford sold the station to current owner Frank Neely, who owned WGCD. WLTC would change formats to urban gospel.

On September 16, 2005, WLTC changed call letters to the then-discarded WGIV. Shortly afterwards, WGIV would relocate their tower to a location southwest of Uptown Charlotte, and would be relicensed to Pineville. For the next eight years, the station would air a full-service format aimed towards African-Americans, usually with urban gospel in the mornings, talk shows in the middays, and urban AC music in the afternoon and evening hours. WGIV would acquire the W277CB translator in 2010.

On March 30, 2014, WGIV changed formats to mainstream urban, branded as "Streetz 103.3". The full-service urban format moved exclusively to wgivcharlotte.com. The station competed against WPEG, which had not had a competitor since December 2010, when rhythmic-formatted WIBT flipped to a more Mainstream Top 40 direction. WGIV received new competition in August 2015, when WQNC relaunched their hip hop-intensive mainstream urban format.

In December 2020, WGIV began simulcasting on WDYT.
