= WPEG =

Coordinates: 35.362°N 81.155°W

- Concord, North Carolina; United States
- Broadcast area: Charlotte; Metrolina
- Frequency: 97.9 MHz (HD Radio)
- Branding: Power 98

Programming
- Format: Mainstream urban
- Subchannels: HD2: Fox Sports Charlotte (sports); HD3: Playa (tropical music)

Ownership
- Owner: Beasley Broadcast Group; (Beasley Media Group Licenses, LLC)
- Sister stations: WBAV-FM; WKQC; WSOC-FM

History
- First air date: 1961 (as WEGO-FM)
- Former call signs: WEGO-FM (1961–1967)
- Call sign meaning: Peggy (name of the wife of former manager Jim Keel)

Technical information
- Licensing authority: FCC
- Facility ID: 6586
- Class: C
- ERP: 95,000 watts (horizontal); 71,700 watts (vertical)
- HAAT: 491 meters (1,611 ft)

Links
- Public license information: Public file; LMS
- Webcast: Listen live
- Website: power98fm.com; foxsportsradiocharlotte.com (HD2)

WPEG (97.9 FM, "Power 98") is a mainstream urban radio station serving the Charlotte, North Carolina, market. It is owned by Beasley Broadcast Group. The station's studios are located on South Boulevard in the city's South End, and a transmitter tower is located north of Dallas, North Carolina.

WPEG features sports from Fox Sports Radio on its HD2 channel and tropical music on its HD3 channel.

== History ==
The 97.9 frequency came on the air in Concord, North Carolina, in 1961 as WEGO-FM, and simulcast the programming of WEGO (1410 AM) until 1967. That year, the station became a beautiful music station with the call letters WPEG. The station was owned by the Suburban Radio Group from Belmont, North Carolina. Suburban Radio Group had purchased, in October 1966, a station in Winston-Salem with the call letters WPEG. Those call letters were chosen in 1960 when the Winston-Salem station came on the air, chosen for the owner Nick Reisenweaver's wife Peggy. When the Winston-Salem station was purchased by Suburban the call letters were changed to WFCM, freeing up WPEG. The call letters for WEGO-FM were changed by then-station manager Jim Keel to WPEG to honor his wife, Peggy. During these years, the station was the feeder station for the Tobacco Radio Network (now the North Carolina News Network) for the western half of North Carolina. The station began broadcasting in stereo in 1973.

In 1970, the station's format changed to country music, and gained a devoted following in Cabarrus County and Stanly County. Popular announcers during its years as a Country station included Gene Hinson, Charlie Hicks, Ken Kennedy and Jay Driggers.

WPEG switched to a gold-based adult contemporary format in July 1975, utilizing Drake-Chenault's "Solid Gold" automated format. Popular announcers during its years in this format were Larry Thomas, Terry Setzer and Shane Atwell.

Drake-Chenault introduced its "Super Soul" syndicated format in 1978, and WPEG was one of the first stations to switch to the format early that year. The station also experimented with club-style DJ mixes on weekends.

A local nightclub DJ, Mitchell Eaves, quickly became popular as "Disco Mitch". His Saturday night broadcast featured live club-style mixing of the latest disco hits, DJ interviews from discotheques across the country, and wild impromptu contests. Eaves was granted full programming and content discretion and took complete advantage, a move that station management was soon to regret. Eaves and programming assistant Paul Allen launched a shoot-the-moon contest in which listeners were asked to drive past the station and show their assets. Throngs of listeners responded, clogging local traffic for hours. Several auto accidents were reported, law enforcement was dispatched and local businesses complained. Eaves and Allen were quickly dismissed by then station manager Charlie Hicks. The incident made headlines worldwide in The New York Times, Rolling Stone, Jet magazine, the Asian press, and closed a broadcast of the CBS Evening News with a chuckle from Walter Cronkite.

The Disco programming was a short-lived experiment, and by late 1979, the format had evolved into a CHR/Urban hybrid format (also known as "CHUrban", which is the forerunner of the rhythmic contemporary format). WPEG has been considered Charlotte's heritage urban radio station since 1982, when the Suburban Radio Group purchased WGIV (1600 AM), and gradually moved their format to the FM station. Popular announcers of its days in this format have included Fred Wellington Graham, Thomas "Skip" Murphy, Michael Saunders, Les Norman, B.J. Murphy, George "Apollo" Fetherbay, Helen Little, Barbara Taylor, Todd Haygood, Nate Quick, Michael "Captain Mike" Rossi, Darryl McClinton, Shirley Girl, Sheila Stewart, Janine Davis, Anthony "Tone X." Belser, Eddie Owens, with Consuella Williams, and Bobby Harris.

The station was branded "WPEG fm98" until 1988 when they rebranded as "Power 98". Sky Broadcasting would buy WPEG and WGIV in November 1986 after Suburban Radio Group's owners died.

At the beginning of 1991, WPEG increased power from 50,000 to 65,000 watts and increased its tower height by 200 feet, hoping to reach more listeners.

Sky Broadcasting would be bought out by Broadcast Partners, Inc. (BPI) in 1992. When BPI bought out rhythmic-formatted WCKZ from Beasley Broadcasting, they ended that format by moving WGIV's then-urban AC programming from the AM dial to the 101.9 FM position and merging WCKZ's programming with WPEG, thus tilting WPEG's urban format towards a mainstream direction (with an emphasis on hip-hop) at the same time. The station continues to thrive in the market.

BPI would merge with Evergreen Media in May 1995. In December 1996, WPEG and Evergreen's four other Charlotte stations were traded to EZ Communications (owners of WSOC-FM and WSSS; WRFX would then go to SFX Broadcasting), with Evergreen receiving EZ Communications' Philadelphia stations WIOQ and WUSL in return; EZ would then be bought by American Radio Systems (ARS) in July 1997. ARS would be bought out by Infinity Broadcasting on September 19, 1997, with Infinity changing its name to CBS Radio in December 2005 as part of the spin-off of CBS' motion picture and cable television assets under a relaunched Viacom.

On October 2, 2014, CBS Radio announced that it would trade all of their Tampa and Charlotte stations (including WPEG), as well as WIP in Philadelphia to the Beasley Broadcast Group in exchange for five stations located in Miami and Philadelphia. The swap was completed on December 1, 2014.
