= EZ Communications =

American radio broadcasting company

EZ Communications, Inc. was a corporation with its headquarters in Fairfax, Virginia. In the 1970s, the small company was one of the pioneers of the easy listening on the FM broadcasting radio spectrum with 2 stations in Manassas and Richmond. Within 25 years, the company grew to 20 stations across the United States.

== History ==
FM broadcasting in the USA began in the 1930s. Although many broadcast radio stations had already been established in the AM frequency range, the use of FM radio offered higher sound quality. However until the 1970s, FM broadcast frequencies were primarily seen as investments in the future, with most of the self-supporting commercial stations simulcasting with AM stations. Few automobiles in the U.S. were equipped to receive FM signals until the early 1970s.

Beautiful music was a mostly-instrumental music format that was prominent in American radio from the 1960s through the 1980s. "Mood music", "easy listening", "elevator music" and (inaccurately) "Muzak" are other common terms for the format and the style of music that it featured.

In the Fairfax, Virginia, Art Kellar was an owner of WEEL an AM radio station, licensed to Fairfax which was one of the Washington, DC area's major top 40 stations in the late 1960s and early 1970s. Kellar acquired control of an FM station nearby, and went on the air with WEZR, licensed to Manassas, Virginia. He used the new beautiful music format featuring primarily instrumental versions of popular music, only interrupted by station breaks and commercial advertisements only every 12–15 minutes, The company's Arbitron ratings indicated it has popular with the public.

In 1970, the company took the successful easy listening format to the Richmond market when it acquired European classical music station WFMV (FM), which had been Virginia's first station to broadcast in multiplex stereo, and changed the call sign to WEZS. The easy listening format was very successful in Richmond has it had been in the Washington DC metro market.

Soon, EZ Communications expanded into larger broadcast markets. Stations which used the easy listening format to find profitability in emerging FM markets were WEZC (FM) 104.7 MHz in Charlotte, North Carolina, and WEZB (FM) 97.1 MHz in New Orleans, Louisiana. In the early 80's EZ made a successful transition from easy listening to creating Contemporary Hit Radio stations in New Orleans (WEZB became B-97) and Pittsburgh (B-94). By 1995, EZ Communications was # 12 in the Top 25 Radio Groups in the U.S. Listeners as of spring 1995, as measured by the Arbitron ratings service.

== Sale to American Radio Systems ==
In 1996, American Radio Systems Corp. of Boston, Massachusetts bought EZ Communications Inc. for about US$655 million. At the time, EZ Communications operated 20 stations in cities such as Seattle, Washington and St. Louis, Missouri. The combination gave American Radio 96 outlets in mostly midsize markets, making it the nation's second-biggest radio broadcaster in advertising sales. The sale officially closed on April 4, 1997.

The combined company's estimated sales of $340 million ranked second only behind Westinghouse Electric Corp.

== See also ==
- FM broadcasting in the USA
- FM broadcast band
- AM broadcasting
- AM stereo
- list of broadcast station classes
- history of radio
- RDS (Radio Data System)
- long-distance FM reception (FM DX)
