= Eric Montross =

American basketball player (1971–2023)

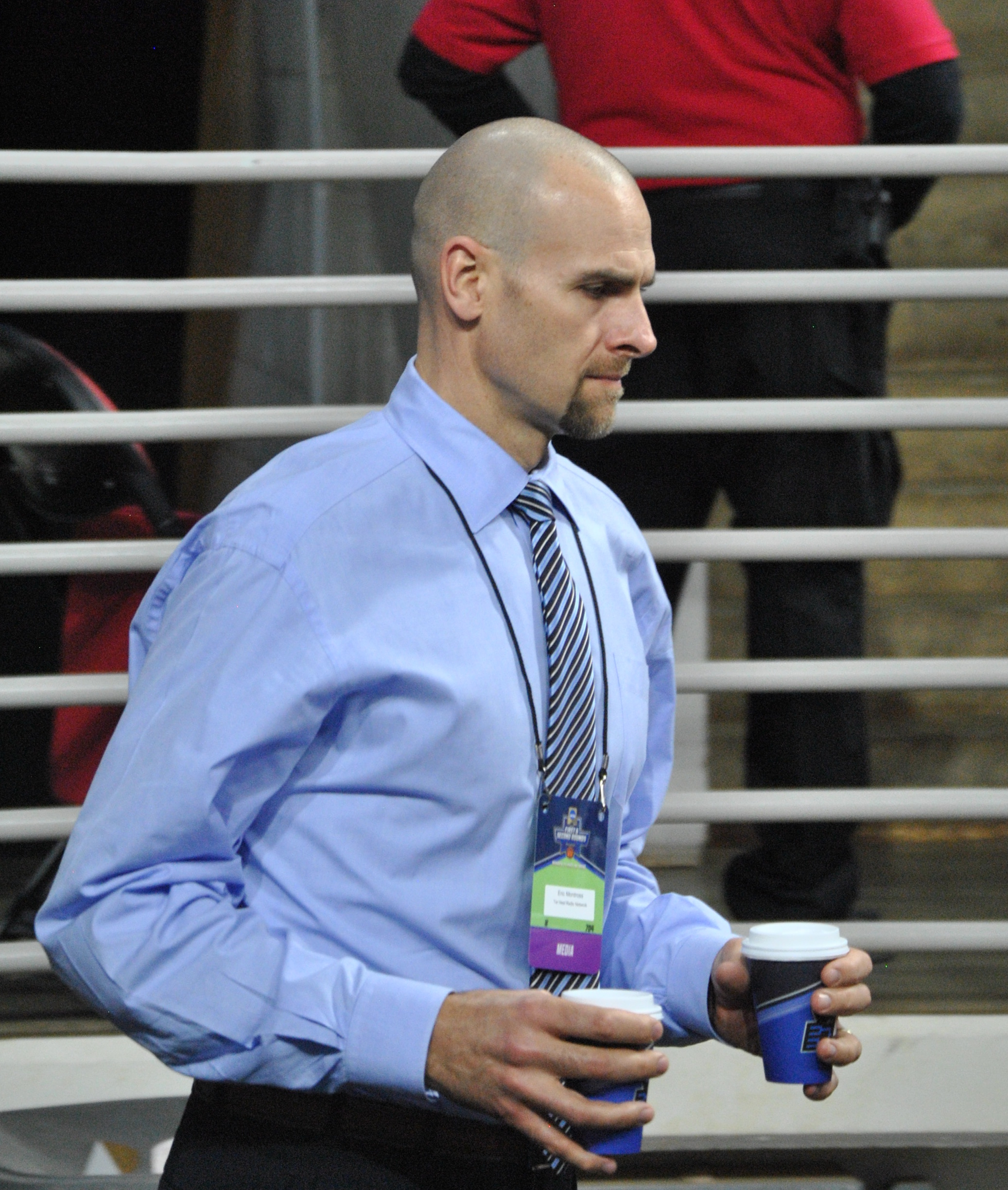
- Montross in 2016

Personal information
- Born: September 23, 1971 Indianapolis, Indiana, U.S.
- Died: December 17, 2023 (aged 52) Chapel Hill, North Carolina, U.S.
- Listed height: 7 ft 0 in (2.13 m)
- Listed weight: 270 lb (122 kg)

Career information
- High school: Lawrence North (Indianapolis, Indiana)
- College: North Carolina (1990–1994)
- NBA draft: 1994: 1st round, 9th overall pick
- Drafted by: Boston Celtics
- Playing career: 1994–2002
- Position: Center
- Number: 0, 00

Career history
- 1994–1996: Boston Celtics
- 1996–1997: Dallas Mavericks
- 1997: New Jersey Nets
- 1997: Philadelphia 76ers
- 1997–2001: Detroit Pistons
- 2001–2002: Toronto Raptors

Career highlights
- NBA All-Rookie Second Team (1995); NCAA champion (1993); 2× Consensus second-team All-American (1993, 1994); First-team All-ACC (1993); Second-team All-ACC (1994); First-team Academic All-American (1994); No. 00 honored by North Carolina Tar Heels; First-team Parade All-American (1990); McDonald's All-American (1990)

Career NBA statistics
- Points: 2,071 (4.5 ppg)
- Rebounds: 2,159 (4.6 rpg)
- FG%: .490
- Stats at NBA.com
- Stats at Basketball Reference

Eric Scott Montross (September 23, 1971 – December 17, 2023) was an American professional basketball player who played in the National Basketball Association (NBA) for eight seasons with the Boston Celtics, Dallas Mavericks, New Jersey Nets, Philadelphia 76ers, Detroit Pistons, and Toronto Raptors. Born in Indianapolis, he played for Lawrence North High School before playing college basketball for the North Carolina Tar Heels, where he twice earned All-American honors and was the starting center for their 1993 National championship team.

== High school ==
Playing for Lawrence North High School, he was selected as a McDonald's All American in 1990. After leading Lawrence North to the Indiana high school basketball championship, Montross committed to the North Carolina Tar Heels. Montross was also named to the USA Today All-American first team.

Montross was also a baseball pitcher in high school and was drafted by the Chicago Cubs with the 1,547th pick overall in the 1994 MLB draft.

== College career ==
Montross was part of the UNC team that won the NCAA Championship against Michigan in 1993 and was named an All-American as a junior and senior. Montross' father and grandfather had played for Michigan. His father Scott was a teammate of Cazzie Russell in the 1960s and his maternal grandfather John Townsend was an All-American in the 1930s. In four seasons at UNC, Montross appeared in 139 games, averaging 11.7 points, 6.8 rebounds and 1.2 blocks per game.

== Professional career ==
=== Boston Celtics (1994–1996) ===
Montross was selected by the Boston Celtics with the ninth overall pick in the 1994 NBA draft. During his first year in the NBA, he averaged career highs of 10 points and 7.3 rebounds per game, and was selected to the 1995 NBA Rookie Challenge and named to the NBA All-Rookie Second Team. However, Montross would never again reach this level of production. The Celtics came under fire for selecting Montross over players such as Eddie Jones, Jalen Rose, and Aaron McKie.

=== Dallas Mavericks (1996–1997) ===
Montross spent two seasons with the Celtics before being traded to the Dallas Mavericks in 1996, in exchange for a 1997 first-round draft pick and the right to swap first-round draft picks in the 1996 NBA draft.

=== New Jersey Nets (1997) ===
At the 1997 trade deadline, Montross, Jim Jackson, Chris Gatling, George McCloud, and Sam Cassell were traded to the New Jersey Nets for Ed O'Bannon, Khalid Reeves, Shawn Bradley and Robert Pack.

=== Philadelphia 76ers (1997) ===
On the day of the 1997 NBA draft, Montross and Jackson were traded to the Philadelphia 76ers with the draft rights of Tim Thomas and Anthony Parker for Don MacLean, Lucious Harris, Michael Cage and the draft rights of Keith Van Horn.

=== Detroit Pistons (1997–2001) ===
In December 1997, Montross and Jerry Stackhouse were traded to the Detroit Pistons for Aaron McKie and Theo Ratliff. During his tenure with the Pistons, Montross played for 167 games, starting 32 of them and averaging 1.9 points and 2.8 rebounds per game.

=== Toronto Raptors (2001–2002) ===
In 2001, Montross and Jerome Williams were traded to the Toronto Raptors for Kornél Dávid, Tyrone Corbin and Corliss Williamson.

=== Retirement ===
Montross announced his retirement on August 26, 2003, due to a foot injury and was waived by the Raptors in February 2004. During his career, Montross averaged 4.5 points, 4.6 rebounds, 0.6 blocks and 0.4 assists per game. He played in 465 games and started 288.

== After basketball ==
Montross was a color commentator on the Tar Heel Sports Network men's basketball broadcasts after Mick Mixon left to become the play-by-play voice of the Carolina Panthers. He commentated alongside play-by-play caller Woody Durham and then Jones Angell for 18 years until 2023.

Montross was known locally for his support for charitable causes, especially fundraising for the North Carolina Children's Hospital at UNC. With the Pan American Health Organization, he co-founded an organization called Vaccine Ambassadors, which aims to distribute vaccines all over the world, especially to developing countries. In 1994, partly in tribute to 16-year-old Jason Clark, a UNC cancer patient he had befriended, he started the Eric Montross Father's Day Basketball Camp, an annual event that by 2010 had raised over one million dollars for the children's hospital. He served on the board of the Be Loud! Sophie Foundation, an organization supporting care for young cancer patients at UNC. He also worked for the Rams Club at UNC as a principal gifts fundraiser.

== Death ==
The Montross family said in a statement in late March 2023 that Montross had recently been diagnosed with cancer and would receive treatment at the UNC Lineberger Comprehensive Cancer Center. He died later that year on December 17 at age 52.

== Career statistics ==
Legend
GP	Games played	GS	Games started	MPG	Minutes per game
FG%	Field goal percentage	3P%	3-point field goal percentage	FT%	Free throw percentage
RPG	Rebounds per game	APG	Assists per game	SPG	Steals per game
BPG	Blocks per game	PPG	Points per game	**Bold**	Career high

=== College ===
Year	Team	GP	GS	MPG	FG%	3P%	FT%	RPG	APG	SPG	BPG	PPG
1990–91	North Carolina	35	9	15.2	.587	-	.612	4.2	.3	.2	.9	5.8
1991–92	North Carolina	31	25	25.3	.574	-	.624	7	.6	.5	1	11.2
1992–93	North Carolina	**38**	**36**	28.3	**.615**	-	**.684**	7.6	.7	**.6**	1.2	**15.8**
1993–94	North Carolina	35	35	**31.7**	.560	-	.558	**8.1**	**.8**	.5	**1.8**	13.6
**Career**		139	105	25.2	.585	-	.624	6.8	.6	.5	1.2	11.7

=== NBA ===
==== Regular season ====
Year	Team	GP	GS	MPG	FG%	3P%	FT%	RPG	APG	SPG	BPG	PPG
1994–95	Boston	**78**	**75**	**29.7**	.534	.000	**.635**	7.3	0.5	**0.4**	0.8	**10.0**
1995–96	Boston	61	59	23.5	**.566**	–	.376	5.8	0.7	0.3	0.5	7.2
1996–97	Dallas	47	46	20.9	.460	–	.294	5.0	0.7	0.2	0.7	3.9
1996–97	New Jersey	31	31	27.2	.451	–	.393	**9.1**	**0.9**	**0.4**	**1.3**	5.1
1997–98	Philadelphia	20	20	16.9	.395	–	.368	4.6	0.4	0.4	0.6	3.4
1997–98	Detroit	28	10	12.6	.456	–	.429	3.8	0.1	0.2	0.5	2.5
1998–99	Detroit	46	2	12.5	.525	.000	.344	3.0	0.3	0.3	0.6	2.1
1999–00	Detroit	51	0	6.5	.309	–	.500	1.4	0.1	0.1	0.2	0.8
2000–01	Detroit	42	20	13.5	.413	–	.269	3.4	0.4	0.2	0.5	2.5
2000–01	Toronto	12	1	6.8	.353	–	.200	2.4	0.3	0.3	0.3	1.1
2001–02	Toronto	49	24	13.4	.402	.000	.323	2.9	0.3	0.2	0.5	2.4
**Career**		465	288	18.2	.490	.000	.478	4.6	0.4	0.3	0.6	4.5

==== Playoffs ====
Year	Team	GP	GS	MPG	FG%	3P%	FT%	RPG	APG	SPG	BPG	PPG
1995	Boston	4	**4**	**15.5**	.455	–	**.500**	2.3	0.0	0.0	0.0	**3.3**
1999	Detroit	**5**	0	14.0	**.500**	–	**.500**	**2.6**	0.0	0.0	0.4	1.4
2000	Detroit	2	0	2.5	–	–	–	1.0	0.0	0.0	0.0	0.0
2001	Toronto	**5**	0	6.2	.400	–	–	2.0	**0.2**	0.0	**0.6**	0.8
**Career**		16	4	10.5	.455	–	.500	2.1	0.1	0.0	0.3	1.5

== See also ==
- 1993 NCAA Men's Basketball All-Americans
- 1994 NCAA Men's Basketball All-Americans
