= Tar Heel Sports Network =

Collegiate sports radio network of NCAA's North Carolina Tar Heels

- Type: Radio network
- Country: United States
- Availability: AM/FM through network affiliates SiriusXM; Internet streaming
- Broadcast area: North Carolina, South Carolina, Virginia
- Owner: Learfield Communications, Inc.
- Official website: List of affiliates

The Tar Heel Sports Network is a radio network in the United States dedicated to broadcasting live events and programming relating to North Carolina Tar Heels athletics. It is operated by Tar Heel Sports Properties, a property of LEARFIELD, which manages the multimedia rights for the University of North Carolina at Chapel Hill.

The network consists mainly of local radio affiliates within North Carolina, southern Virginia, and northern South Carolina, and also includes SiriusXM satellite radio, and streaming platforms including GoHeels.com, The Varsity Network and TuneIn.

The network's flagship stations are WPTF in Raleigh, North Carolina and WCHL in Chapel Hill, North Carolina.

== History ==
The network's predecessor in collegiate sports radio broadcasting in North Carolina during the 1940s and 1950s was the Tobacco Road Network which covered all of the ACC's Big Four schools (North Carolina, N.C. State, Duke and Wake Forest).

The first attempt to create a dedicated radio network for Tar Heel men's basketball outside the Triangle began in the early 1960s by Bill Currie at WVOT in Wilson, NC. When Currie later moved to WSOC in Charlotte, NC, he grew the network to 60 stations.

By the mid-1970s, Village Broadcasting had acquired ownership of the network, which was managed by WCHL in Chapel Hill. Village Broadcasting evolved into VilCom, and sold the network in October 1999 to Learfield.

The state's most powerful AM station, 1110 WBT in Charlotte, was an affiliate of the network from 1971-1990, 1995-2006 and 2012-2026. WBT is a 50,000-watt clear-channel station that reaches parts of 22 states at night, which brought the Tar Heels' broadcasts to much of the eastern half of North America. According to longtime WBT station manager Cullie Tarleton, putting the Tar Heels on WBT was largely the idea of longtime coach Dean Smith, who wanted to tell recruits from the Northeastern United States that their parents would be able to listen to the games.

Beginning in 2006, WFNZ served as the network's Charlotte outlet. However, its weaker nighttime signal forced the Tar Heels to contract first with WRFX-FM (2006-2011) and WNOW-FM (2011-2012) to simulcast football games that kicked off after 5 p.m., as well as all basketball games. The Tar Heels returned to WBT beginning with the 2012 football season.

On January 8, 2026, 1110 WBT-AM ended regular broadcasts, directing listeners to tune to 107.9 FM for WBT programming including THSN programming.

North Carolina's other 50,000-watt AM station, 680 WPTF in Raleigh joined the network in 2021. As part of the deal, WPTF was designated as the network's new flagship. WPTF had long been the flagship of rival NC State for more than 40 years until 2007. Games are also simulcast on 92.9 FM.

Between WBT and WPTF, the two stations combined to bring nighttime games to most of the eastern half of the North American continent.

For many years prior to growth of the ACC's current 18-team membership, the network would annually provide full "baseline-to-baseline" coverage of all games of the ACC Men's Basketball Tournament regardless of the Tar Heels' participation.

== Broadcasters ==
Bill Currie, known as "The Mouth of the South", was instrumental in developing the original statewide network in the 1960s and was the network's first play-by-play announcer until departing to KDKA-TV in 1971. Curry was famously known for his humor and irreverence. His most often quoted line came during a 1968 ACC Tournament broadcast when he described N.C. State's 12-10 win over Duke as "about as exciting as artificial insemination."

The network's long-time "Voice of the Tar Heels" for football and men's basketball games was Woody Durham from 1971 until his retirement in 2011. Durham called 23 bowl games and 13 Final Fours which included both of Dean Smith's national championships in 1982 and 1993, along with Roy William's first two national championships in 2005 and 2009.

Durham was known for expressions during his broadcasts which included "Go where you go and do what you do," "Go to war, Miss Agnes" (a phrase Durham heard from Chuck Thompson during a Baltimore Colts game), and "Good gosh gurdy" following an upset football win over the Miami Hurricanes in 2004.

Mick Mixon partnered with Durham as the color analyst and host from 1989-2005 for both football and men's basketball before departing to become the play-by-play announcer for the Carolina Panthers.

Current play-by-play announcer Jones Angell succeeded Durham in the booth as "the Voice of the Tar Heels" for both football and men's basketball beginning with the 2011 football season after working with the network in various roles for the previous 11 years, including baseball and women's basketball play-by-play, and host of football and men's basketball broadcasts. Angell has called 3 Final Fours, including the 2017 national championship.

Beginning in the 2024 football season, football analyst duties were shared between former quarterback Bryn Renner and former wide receiver Joe Jauch, both former Tar Heel letterman. Lee Pace handled football sideline reporting. After Pace's retirement prior to the 2026 football season, Renner moved to full-time sideline reporting while Jauch became the main booth analyst.

Other contributors to football broadcasts include Dave Nathan and former receiver Na Brown co-hosting pregame and postgame coverage, and former center and NFL All-Pro Jeff Saturday providing pregame analysis.

From the 2005-06 season through the 2022-23 season, Eric Montross was the in-game analyst for men's basketball. Shortly after the end of the 2022-23 season, it was announced that he had recently been diagnosed with cancer. After announcing that he would sit out the 2023-24 season to focus on his health, Montross died on December 17, 2023 at age 52.

Men's basketball game analysis duties since the 2023-24 season have been primarily handled by Tyler Hansbrough and Tyler Zeller, both members of the 2009 national championship team. Nathan anchors basketball pregame, halftime and postgame programming, while Adam Lucas provides pregame commentary, postgame interviews and columns on GoHeels.com.

Nathan occasionally handles the men's basketball play-by-play when conflicts with the late season football schedule prevent Angell from being available.

Nathan is also the primary play-by-play announcer for the baseball Diamond Heels. Matt Krause calls the action for women's basketball.

Since 2016, Angell and Lucas have co-hosted Carolina Insider, producing a weekly podcast and YouTube content that features game discussions, post-game analysis and interviews. It is a production of the network and LEARFIELD.

UNC head coaches Bill Belichick (football), Michael Malone (men's basketball), Courtney Banghart (women's basketball) and Scott Forbes (baseball) co-host programs on the network during their respective team's season.

Other notable on-air color analysts and contributors over the history of the network include Phil Ford, Stephen Gates, Jerod Haase, Jim Heavner, Henry Hinton, Bob Holliday, Charlie "Choo Choo" Justice, Freddie Kiger, Lee Kinard, Ken Mack, Draggan Mihailovich, Bob Quincy, Mike Waddell, Rick Steinbacher and Brian Simmons.

== List of affiliates ==
=== Current network stations ===
Station	Frequency	City	Format	Sports in addition to Football & Men's Basketball	Notes
WSPC	AM 1010	Albemarle, North Carolina	News/talk		Relayed on FM via translator W297CE on 107.3 MHz
WZJS	FM 100.7	Boone, North Carolina	Classic Hits		Simulcast on W256CV on 99.1 MHz
WBHN	AM 1590	Bryson City, North Carolina	Classic country		Relayed on FM via translator W231DQ on 94.1 MHz
WBAG	AM 1150	Burlington, North Carolina	Full service	Baseball	Relayed on FM via translator W290CX on 105.9 MHz.
WCHL	AM 1360	Chapel Hill, North Carolina	News/talk/sports/Adult Album Alternative	Women's Basketball, Baseball	Legacy flagship station. Relayed on FM via translator W250BP on 97.9 MHz.
WBT-FM	FM 107.5	Chester, South Carolina	News/talk/sports		Listed as affiliate of record for Charlotte, NC.
WPTI	FM 94.5	Eden, North Carolina	News/talk/sports		Listed as the affiliate for Greensboro, High Point, & Winston-Salem, North Carolina.
WPEK	AM 880	Fairview, North Carolina	Sports		Listed as affiliate of record for Asheville, NC. Daytime-only signal. Relayed on FM via translator W225CJ on 92.9 MHz at Asheville.
WFAY	AM 1230	Fayetteville, North Carolina	Country		Relayed on FM via translator W261CX on 100.1 MHz
WGBR	AM 1150	Goldsboro, North Carolina	Classic hits		Relayed on FM via translator W252CL on 98.3 MHz
WIZS	AM 1450	Henderson, North Carolina	Variety		Relayed on FM via translator W261DK 100.1 MHz
WHKP	AM 1450	Hendersonville, North Carolina	Country/conservative talk		Relayed on FM via translator W299BZ 107.7 MHz
WWMC	AM 1010	Kinston, North Carolina	Urban gospel		Relayed on FM via translator W225CD 92.9 MHz
WEWO	AM 1460	Laurinburg, North Carolina	Gospel		
WLON	AM 1050	Lincolnton, North Carolina	Oldies		Relayed on FM via translator W298CK 107.5 MHz
WHEE	AM 1370	Martinsville, Virginia	Full service		
WMNC	FM 92.1	Morganton, North Carolina	New country		
WSYD	AM 1300	Mount Airy, North Carolina	Oldies		Relayed on FM via translator W286DM 105.1
WNBU	FM 94.1	Oriental, North Carolina	Rhythmic oldies		Listed as the affiliate of record for New Bern, Jacksonville and Morehead City, NC. Also simulcast on 94.3 WRHD-HD2 (Farmville, NC) and translator W274CK on 102.7 MHz (Winterville, NC).
WPTF	AM 680	Raleigh, North Carolina	News/talk		Official flagship station. Listed as the affiliate of record for Apex, Cary, Durham, & Wake Forest, North Carolina. Relayed on FM via translators W255DF 92.9 MHz (Raleigh), W254AS 98.7 MHz (Rolesville), W298DB 107.5 MHz (Smithfield)
WRXO	AM 1430	Roxboro, North Carolina	Classic country		Daytime-only station
WKRX	FM 96.7	Roxboro, North Carolina	Bluegrass, Carolina Beach Music		
WCAB	AM 590	Rutherfordton, North Carolina	Country		Relayed on FM via translator W265DW 100.9 MHz
WFJA	FM 105.5	Sanford, North Carolina	Classic hits		
WOHS	AM 1390	Shelby, North Carolina	Oldies, Beach Music	Women's Basketball, Baseball	
WMXF	AM 1400	Waynesville, North Carolina	Sports		
WKSK	AM 580	West Jefferson, North Carolina	Sports		Simulcast of WPEK. Relayed on FM via translator W228CW 93.5 MHz
WIAM	AM 900	Williamston, North Carolina	Classic country		Relayed on FM via translator W221ES 92.1 MHz
WMFD	AM 630	Wilmington, North Carolina	Sports		Relayed on FM via translator W269DF on 101.7 MHz. Also relayed on HD radio over WKXB-HD3.
