= WABZ =

WABZ may refer to:

- WABZ-LP, a low-power radio station (101.5 FM) licensed to serve Albemarle, North Carolina, United States
- WTAX-FM, a radio station (93.9 FM) licensed to serve Sherman, Illinois, United States, which held the call sign WABZ from 2005 to 2013
- WYFQ-FM, a radio station (100.9 FM) licensed to serve Indian Trail, North Carolina, which held the call sign WABZ-FM from 1983 to 2004
- WSPC, a radio station (1010 AM) licensed to serve Albemarle, North Carolina, which held the call sign WABZ from 1946 to 1979
- WLNO (New Orleans), a radio station (1060 AM) licensed to serve New Orleans, Louisiana, which held the call sign WABZ from 1924 to 1933
