= Jones Angell =

American radio announcer

- Born: Monrovie Jones Angell IV; 1979 (age 46–47); Sanford, North Carolina, U.S.
- Education: University of North Carolina, Chapel Hill
- Sports commentary career
- Teams: North Carolina Tar Heels baseball, football and men’s basketball
- Genre: Play-by-play

Monrovie Jones Angell IV (born 1979 in Sanford, North Carolina), known professionally as Jones Angell, is the current play-by-play radio announcer for the North Carolina Tar Heels football and basketball programs.

== Early life ==
Angell spent most of his childhood in Jacksonville, North Carolina. He grew up listening to Woody Durham and Mick Mixon calling Tar Heel football and basketball games on the radio with his family. Growing up, Angell wanted to do NCAA Division I play-by-play announcing, against the objections of his mother.

While a student at the University of North Carolina at Chapel Hill, Angell enrolled in what was then known as the School of Journalism and Mass Communication. Between his sophomore and junior years, he started interning with the Tar Heel Sports Network, where he feels he received most of his training.

== Early career ==
Angell started out his career calling high school football and baseball games in Jacksonville, North Carolina in 1999.

Angell's first job with the Tar Heel Sports Network was calling play-by-play for a Little League Baseball game for WIZS while still an intern. John Rose, who was the engineer for the Tar Heel Sports Network at the time, is part of the family who owns WIZS.

Angell continued to call high school football games while still an undergraduate at UNC Chapel Hill. He also started doing color commentary for North Carolina Tar Heels women's soccer and women's basketball.

After graduating from UNC Chapel Hill, Angell worked in various radio and hosting positions within the Tar Heel Sports Network. Prior to becoming the voice of the Tar Heels, Angell was best known for providing color and later play-by-play commentary for Tar Heel baseball from 2000 to 2011, and for working alongside Durham and his staff as a host and color analyst for football and men's basketball broadcasts from 2005 until 2011.

As assistant director of new media at UNC Chapel Hill, Angell produced many features that have been shown on the video boards at Kenan Stadium and the Dean Smith Center.

== As the play-by-play announcer for the Tar Heels ==
A nationwide search was conducted to find Durham’s successor after Durham announced his retirement in 2011. Angell beat out several other candidates to become the new voice of the Tar Heels. Then-Tar Heel Sports Network general manager Gary Sobba and then-UNC Chapel Hill athletic director Dick Baddour flew out to Omaha, Nebraska, during the 2011 College World Series to inform Angell of the news.

In Angell’s second season as play-by-play announcer for Tar Heel football, Angell called a game-winning punt return made by Gio Bernard against North Carolina State, snapping the Tar Heels' six-game losing streak against State.

Bernard fields it at the 26. Heading to the far side. Gio at the 35. Gio, he's at the 50. No, he's not! Yes he is! Gio is gonna take it for a touchdown! Are you kidding me?

Angell feels this call sparked his relationship with the Tar Heel fanbase and says people still talk to him about this particular call. Angell even parodied this call for a video for The Daily Tar Heel’s sports department.

When the 2016-17 basketball team won the school's sixth NCAA title, Angell ended the game by saying:

For 2017, the Tar Heels are the national dadgum champions!

His use of "dadgum" was a nod to basketball coach Roy Williams' frequent use of the word.

Two of Jones Angell's most memorable basketball calls occurred during the 2021-22 basketball season, the first under Coach Hubert Davis, in which the Tar Heels upset Duke twice. The first one came in the final home game of legendary Duke coach Mike Krzyzewski:

And in his final game in Cameron, Coach K takes an L... courtesy of the Tar Heels.

And when the Tar Heels, an #8 seed, knocked of #2 seed Duke in the Final Four, the first such meeting in the storied history of the rivalry, Angell remarked:

2 seconds... 1 second! Ding dong, Duke is done!

Angell called part of the 2014 Tar Heel baseball season for ESPN3 and WatchESPN.

Angell also wrote articles for the now-defunct magazines Tar Heel Monthly and CAROLINA: the Magazine, as well as for GoHeels.com.

Angell co-hosts a podcast, Carolina Insider, that launched on September 20, 2016, in a partnership with Learfield Communications and podcast provider DGital Media. Angell's co-host is Adam Lucas, a longtime TarHeelBlue.com and GoHeels.com columnist, an author of Tar Heel men's basketball books, and a contributor to Tar Heel Sports Network broadcasts. Angell worked with Lucas, who provided color commentary, on Tar Heel Sports Network coverage of Tar Heel baseball as early as 2004. Learfield offered Angell the podcast by himself, but Angell asked Learfield if Lucas could co-host the podcast with him. Both Angell and Lucas were considering working on a podcast together prior to Learfield's offer.

== Personal life ==
Angell is married with two children.
