= Carolina Week =

Production
- Producer: University of North Carolina at Chapel Hill
- Production location: Chapel Hill, North Carolina

Original release
- Release: February 2000 – present

Carolina Week is a student television news program from the School of Journalism and Mass Communications at the University of North Carolina at Chapel Hill. Carolina Week airs live on Monday and Wednesdays at 5:00 PM during the fall and spring semesters. Carolina Connection, the sister radio program, airs Saturdays at 7:30 AM on 1360 AM WCHL.

== About Carolina Week ==
Carolina Week is a student television newscast produced by students of the School of Journalism and Mass Communication. Students are responsible for all of the pieces aired as well as the production of the show. Supervised by a management team of professors and graduate students with prior professional broadcast experience, students shoot, write and edit their own stories. The program allows students to gain a strong hands-on experience in the broadcast journalism field. Carolina Week has won numerous state, regional, and national awards.

Reporters cover University, community and state news for two TV newscasts. Each half hour TV newscast included news, weather and sports segments. Students commit approximately 500 work hours to the shows each week. These hours go into covering stories, editing, running studio and control room equipment and many other tasks.

Carolina Week's first show aired February 2000 in the newly renovated Carroll Hall on UNC-Chapel Hill's campus. On October 1, 2003, the show went live. On December 3, 2003, Carolina Week carried out its first live remote.

== About Carolina Connection ==
Carolina Connection is a student radio newscast also produced by students of the School of Journalism and Mass Communication. The scope of coverage is on Chapel Hill and the surrounding area. It is a half-hour radio newscast that airs on 1360 AM WCHL. Carolina Connection has won numerous awards on the state, regional, and national levels.

Carolina Connection allows students to experience the broadcast journalism field from an audio standpoint. Many reports are produced independently from the television program, though at times certain stories are shared.

Carolina Connection first aired September 14, 2004, and began live broadcast September 2, 2006, complete with weather and sports reports. Carolina Connection podcasts its program on a weekly basis on its website.
