= Woody Durham =

American sportscaster (1941–2018)

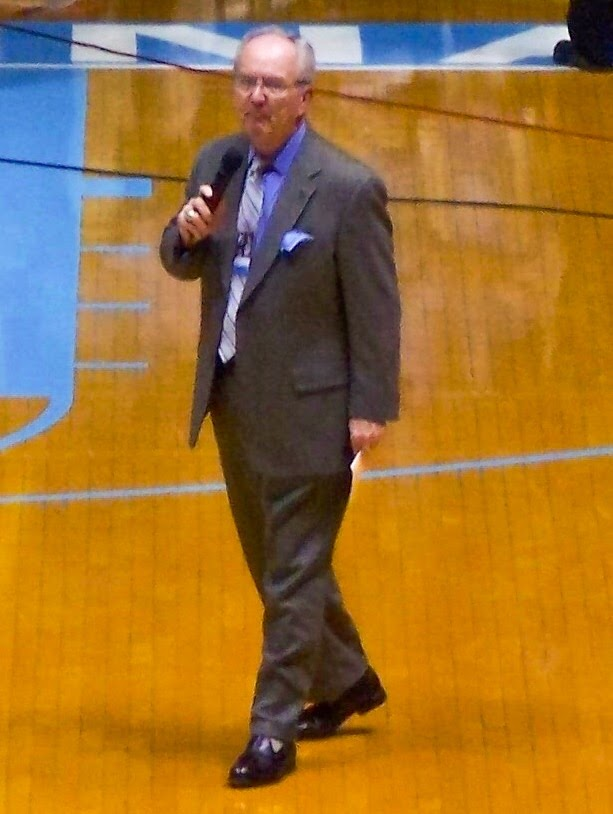
- Durham during halftime of a 2007 Tar Heels men's basketball game against Wake Forest
- Born: Woody Lombardi Durham; August 8, 1941; Mebane, North Carolina, U.S.
- Died: March 7, 2018 (aged 76); Chapel Hill, North Carolina, U.S.
- Education: University of North Carolina, Chapel Hill
- Spouse: Jean Durham
- Children: Wes Durham, Taylor Durham
- Sports commentary career
- Teams: North Carolina Tar Heels football and men’s basketball
- Genre: Play-by-play

Woody Lombardi Durham (August 8, 1941 – March 7, 2018) was an American play-by-play radio announcer for the North Carolina Tar Heels football and men's basketball programs from 1971 to 2011.

== Early life ==
Born in Mebane, North Carolina, Durham grew up in Albemarle, North Carolina. He grew up a Tar Heel fan; as a child, Durham attended Tar Heel football games with his family after World War II.

Durham was close with Bob Harris, who would eventually become the Voice of the Duke Blue Devils. The two played on the same Little League Baseball team. In 1957, Durham was a guard for Albemarle High School's football team; Harris was the team's manager. Durham and Harris also sang together for Albemarle High School's chorus as well as in a double quartet.

In 1961, while Durham was an undergraduate at the University of North Carolina at Chapel Hill, he was initiated into the Alpha Rho chapter of Phi Mu Alpha Sinfonia.

Durham graduated with a bachelor's degree in radio, television and motion pictures in 1963.

== Career ==
=== Early career ===
Durham began his career at WZKY, a small AM radio station in his hometown of Albemarle, at age 16. As a student announcer, Durham played rock-and-roll records, broadcast church sermons, and did color commentary for high school basketball.

Durham was the sports director of WUNC-TV while he was an undergraduate. He also called baseball games around this time.

After graduating, Durham briefly worked at WBTW-TV before becoming the sports director of WFMY-TV, where he worked from October 1963 until August 1977. While there, Durham also worked on the station's Atlantic Coast Conference package, what would be the predecessor to Raycom Sports. He also did color commentary for Wake Forest Demon Deacons football, starting in 1964. When Wake Forest decided to fire their football coach in favor of hiring a new coach, Durham moved on to call Guilford College football for two years. Durham's work with WFMY-TV led him to want to call play-by-play for ACC football and men's basketball.

In 1975, Durham was the president of both the North Carolina Sports Hall of Fame and the Atlantic Coast Sportswriters' Association.

In 1977, Durham became the Director of Sports and Sports Development at WRDU-TV (which became WPTF in 1978). He stayed with WPTF-TV for four years.

=== The Voice of the Tar Heels (1971–2011) ===
While still working for WFMY-TV, Durham became the play-by-play announcer of Tar Heel football and basketball in 1971. He took over from the radio network's founder, Bill Currie, the "Mouth of the South," when Currie took a television job in Pittsburgh, Pennsylvania. Durham also became the master of ceremonies for The Bill Dooley Show and The Dean Smith Show, television programs that aired throughout North Carolina.

In 1981, Durham was named vice president and executive sports director at Tar Heel Sports Marketing.

Durham remained the host of the television shows until 1983, when Jefferson-Pilot Communications bought the rights to UNC Chapel Hill's football and men's basketball television shows. Jefferson-Pilot also developed call-in and five-minute drive-time radio shows with Smith and Mack Brown. Durham would return to hosting the football television show, then known as The Mack Brown Television Show, in 1993 after the Village Companies, the owners of the Tar Heel Sports Network, bought back the multimedia rights for UNC Chapel Hill. In addition to the football and men's basketball shows, the rights also included Jefferson-Pilot's radio properties. Smith, on the other hand, retained Jefferson-Pilot's John Kilgo as host of his radio and television shows.

In 1999, Learfield Communications bought the multimedia rights from Tar Heel Sports Marketing. As Learfield preferred to have only one announcer host all of its multimedia shows, and Smith was retiring from coaching, Durham once again became the host of the men's basketball television and radio shows.

As the Voice of the Tar Heels, Durham was also behind the microphone for 13 Final Fours, including national title wins in 1982, 1993, 2005, and 2009. He also called 23 bowl games.

When the UNC Chapel Hill athletic department relaunched its website, TarHeelBlue.com (now GoHeels.com), Durham and his then color analyst partner Mick Mixon were given editorial columns on the website.

After forty years as the Voice of the Tar Heels, Durham announced his retirement on April 20, 2011. A nationwide search was conducted to find his successor. Jones Angell, who worked with the Tar Heel Sports Network as a host and as Durham's color analyst, was named the new Voice of the Tar Heels approximately two months later.

Some of Durham's expressions during his broadcasts include "Go where you go and do what you do," "Go to war, Miss Agnes" (a phrase Durham heard from Chuck Thompson during a Baltimore Colts game), and "Good gosh gurdy." Durham is also known for his "How 'bout them Heels" play call before the end of the 1982 NCAA Division I Men's Basketball Championship Game. Durham repeated this play call for a homecoming ceremony at Kenan Stadium after the 1982 championship game, before the members of that championship team spoke to the audience.

In addition to Mixon and Angell, Durham's broadcast partners have included Phil Ford, Charlie Justice, and Eric Montross.

=== Post-broadcasting career ===
With the help of his wife Jean and sportswriter Adam Lucas, Durham published his autobiography, Woody Durham: A Tar Heel Voice, on September 4, 2012. The book was awarded a Willie Parker Peace History Book Award from the North Carolina Society of Historians in 2013.

Durham wrote editorials for the now defunct magazine CAROLINA: The Magazine.

Durham hosted a radio program, Woody Durham’s Great Moments in Sports History, for WNCW. The program, which first aired in December 2014, was a 60- to 90-second show focusing on little-known sports history facts.

== Awards and honors ==
- J. Robert Marlowe Award of Merit (1971), by the North Carolina Association of Broadcasters.
- Distinguished Service Awards, by the Greensboro Jaycees and the North Carolina High School Athletic Association.
- Sports Hall of Fame (1993), by Stanly County, North Carolina.
- Carolina Priceless Gem Award (1994), by UNC Chapel Hill.
- Distinguished Service Medal (1995), by UNC General Alumni Association.
- William R. Davie Award (2000), by UNC Chapel Hill Board of Trustees.
- Russell Blunt Legends Award (2003), by NCHSAA.
- Lindsey Nelson Outstanding Sportscaster Award (2005), by All-American Football Foundation.
- Sports Hall of Fame (2008), by City of Mebane.
- Outstanding Service Award (2010), by UNC Lineberger Comprehensive Cancer Center.
- Chris Schenkel Award (2011), by National Football Foundation.
- Vince Lombardi Excellence in College Broadcasting Award (2012), by Lombardi Award Ceremony.
- Lindsey Nelson Broadcasting Award (2017), by Knoxville Quarterback Club.

The University of North Carolina at Chapel Hill gave Durham several awards in addition to those listed above. For Durham's contributions to the UNC Tar Heels men's golf program, the program inducted him into their A.E. Finley Order of Merit. He was named North Carolina Sportscaster of the Year thirteen times, last winning the award in 2009. During the 2002 ACC men's basketball tournament, Durham was presented with the Marvin "Skeeter" Francis award for his services to the ACC. He was inducted into the North Carolina Association of Broadcasters in 2004 and the North Carolina Sports Hall of Fame on May 19, 2005.

An endowed professorship made in Durham's name, the Woody Durham Distinguished Professorship Fund, was also established in 2005. This professorship was created to seek out deserving new faculty members for UNC Chapel Hill's Department of Communication. Durham received the Curt Gowdy Media Award for his contributions to basketball during the Naismith Memorial Basketball Hall of Fame Enshrinement Ceremony in September 2015. A presentation honoring Durham receiving the Curt Gowdy Media Award was held in the Smith Center on February 17, 2016, during halftime of the Duke/UNC Chapel Hill men's basketball game.

Durham was named a Town Treasure, an award honoring exceptional citizens of Chapel Hill and Carrboro, North Carolina, by the Chapel Hill Historical Society for his work with fundraising efforts around the city of Chapel Hill.

Durham was elected to the National Sports Media Association Hall of Fame on January 16, 2018. He was formally inducted to the Hall during NSMA's fifty-ninth Award Weekend on June 25, 2018, in Winston-Salem, North Carolina. Durham is one of only two play-by-play announcers to be in inducted in the NSMA Hall of Fame; the other being Larry Munson. Wes Durham, who accepted Durham's Hall of Fame award on Durham's behalf, told the Winston-Salem Journal about the establishment of the Woody Durham College Voice Award, also presented during the Award Weekend. Founded by the NSMA, UNC-CH, and Learfield Sports, the award honors college broadcasters.

== Personal life ==
Durham married Jean after graduating from UNC Chapel Hill in 1963.

Durham and Jean were involved in several charitable efforts in the Chapel Hill area after moving back in 1984. Durham was most proud of his work with the Ronald McDonald House of Chapel Hill; his fundraising efforts helped build and expand the home. He also was involved with the Eastern North Carolina chapter of the National Multiple Sclerosis Society.

Durham was diagnosed with primary progressive aphasia in January 2016. In June 2016, Durham wrote a letter that was posted on GoHeels.com, announcing that he would retire from public speaking.

Durham's eldest son, Wes Durham, is the former play-by-play radio voice of ACC rival Georgia Tech and current play-by-play radio voice of the Atlanta Falcons. His youngest son, Taylor, is currently the play-by-play announcer for the Elon Phoenix.

== Death ==
Durham died on March 7, 2018, of complications from primary progressive aphasia.
