= WHTD =

WHTD may refer to:

- WJYD, a radio station (106.3 FM) licensed to serve London, Ohio, United States, which held the call sign WHTD from 2022 to 2024
- WVGC (AM), a radio station (1400 AM) licensed to serve Elberton, North Carolina, United States, which held the call sign WHTD from 2017 to 2022
- WGHC (FM), a defunct radio station in Georgia which held the call sign WHTD in 2012 and from 2014 to 2017
- WNGM (AM), a defunct radio station (1340 AM) formerly licensed to Mountain City, Georgia, United States, which held the call sign WHTD from 2013 to 2014
- WLET, a defunct radio station (1420 AM) formerly licensed to Toccoa, Georgia, which held the call sign WHTD from 2011 to 2012
- WDKL, a radio station (102.7 FM) licensed to Mount Clemens, Michigan, United States, which held the call sign WHTD from 2005 to 2011
- WXKE, a radio station (96.3 FM) licensed to Churubusco, Indiana, United States, which held the call sign WHTD in 2002
- WCYE, a radio station (93.7 FM) licensed to Three Lakes, Wisconsin, United States, which held the call sign WHTD from 1994 to 1999
- WPOP, a radio station (1410 AM) licensed to serve Hartford, Connecticut, United States, which held the call sign WHTD from 1944 to 1946
