= WELG =

WELG may mean:

- WELG-LP, a defunct low-power radio station (104.7 FM) formerly licensed to serve Live Oak, Florida, United States
- WNGM (AM), a defunct radio station (1340 AM) formerly licensed to serve Mountain City, Georgia, United States, which held the call sign WELG in 2013
- WJIP, a radio station (1370 AM) licensed to serve Ellenville, New York, United States, which held the call sign WELG from 2006 to 2009
- WHAK-FM, a radio station (99.9 FM) licensed to serve Rogers City, Michigan, United States, which held the call sign WELG from 1994 to 1997
- WELG (Elgin, Illinois), a defunct radio station (103.9 FM) formerly licensed to serve Elgin, Illinois, United States; succeeded by WAWY
