= WLNK =

WLNK may refer to:

- WBT-FM, a radio station (107.9 FM) licensed to Charlotte, North Carolina, which held the call sign WLNK from 1997 to 2025
- WYFQ-FM, a radio station (100.9 FM) licensed to Weddington, North Carolina, which held the call sign WLNK-FM from 2025 to 2026
