= WNGM =

WNGM may refer to the following broadcast stations in the north Georgia mountains:

- WNGM (AM) 1340, a defunct radio station formerly licensed to serve Mountain City, Georgia, United States
- WGHC (FM), a defunct radio station (91.7 FM) formerly licensed to serve Tallulah Falls, Georgia, which held the callsign WNGM from 2012 to 2014
- WJUL AM 1230, a radio station licensed to serve Hiawassee, Georgia, which held the callsign WNGM from 2006 to 2011
- WUVG-DT 43 (34.x) in Atlanta, which was originally WNGM-TV in Athens
- WLOV-LD 26 in Cumming, an LPTV station which was WNGM-LD briefly in early 2012
