= WSOC =

WSOC may refer to:

- WSOC-TV, a television station (channel 9 virtual/19 digital) licensed to Charlotte, North Carolina, United States
- WSOC-FM, a radio station (103.7 FM) licensed to Charlotte, North Carolina, United States
- WYFQ, a radio station (930 AM) licensed to Charlotte, North Carolina, United States, which used the call sign WSOC until March 1992
- WHVN, a radio station (1240 AM) licensed to Charlotte, North Carolina, United States, which used the call sign WSOC until the 1960s
- Women's soccer
