= WYFQ =

Bible Broadcasting affiliate in Charlotte, North Carolina

WYFQ and WYHG
WYFQ: Charlotte, North Carolina; WYHG: Wadesboro, North Carolina; United States
- Broadcast area: Charlotte, North Carolina
- Frequencies: WYFQ: 930 kHz; WYHG: 93.5 MHz
- Branding: BBN Radio

Programming
- Format: Christian radio

Ownership
- Owner: Bible Broadcasting Network
- Sister stations: WYFQ-FM

History
- First air date: WYFQ: 1951
- Former call signs: WYFQ: WIST (1951–1960); WSOC (1960–1992); WYHG: WRPL (1989–1996) WYFQ-FM (1996–2026)
- Call sign meaning: WYFQ: "Where You Find Quality"; WYHG: Where You Hear the Gospel

Technical information
- Licensing authority: FCC
- Facility ID: WYFQ: 5152; WYHG: 73965
- Class: WYFQ: B; WYHG: C3
- Power: WYFQ: 5,000 watts (day); 1,000 watts (night)
- ERP: WYHG: 8,700 watts
- HAAT: WYHG: 169 meters (554 ft)
- Transmitter coordinates: WYFQ: 35°16′0″N 80°54′5″W; WYHG: 35°02′57″N 80°18′38″W

Links
- Public license information: WYFQ: Public file; LMS; WYHG: Public file; LMS
- Webcast: Listen Live
- Website: WYFQ page on BBNRadio.org

WYFQ (930 kHz) and WYHG (93.5 MHz) are two radio stations in the Charlotte metropolitan area of North Carolina that serve as the flagship stations of the Bible Broadcasting Network along with WYFQ-FM. The AM station operates with a power of 5,000 watts daytime and 1,000 watts nighttime, and is licensed to Charlotte. A directional antenna system is used during the station's nighttime hours. The FM station operates with an effective radiated power of 8,700 watts, and is licensed to the Wadesboro, North Carolina. The FM station serves mainly as a repeater for the eastern portion of the Charlotte radio market.

== History ==
The 930 frequency first went on the air with the call sign WIST in 1951. WIST was founded by Cosmos Broadcasting Company, and was a sister station to Columbia, South Carolina's heritage station 560 WIS, as well as having an FM simulcast (now WNLV). Its first studios were on North Tryon Street, two blocks from the square in uptown Charlotte.

As WIST, the station was initially a network affiliate of the Mutual Broadcasting System, but by the late 1950s, it had dropped the network to become Charlotte's first independent radio station and later Charlotte's first Top-40 station. Popular disc jockeys at that time included Jimmy Kilgo, Bob Chessen and Jim Martin.

In 1960, in a rare move for broadcasters of the day, WIST traded frequencies with WSOC at 1240 on the dial (now WHVN). AM 1240 became WIST, while AM 930 became WSOC.

=== 93-WSOC ("Good Music") ===
As WSOC, the 930 frequency inherited the legacy of Charlotte's second-oldest station. WSOC had signed on in 1929 as WRBU, becoming WSOC a year later. The new WSOC gained sister stations in WSOC-FM (103.7) and WSOC-TV (channel 9). The station's MOR music format and NBC Radio Network affiliation came to 930, as well as WSOC's heritage morning announcer Jack Knight.

Knight eventually was replaced as morning announcer by Denny Mills, and returned to the air on his old 1240 frequency on the then-WIST. Other popular announcers on WSOC in those days included Glenn Hamrick, Bill Currie and Jack Callaghan.

Barry Noll of WSOC reacted to a 1971 format change by WBT from "good music" to adult contemporary by saying, "We are, of course, delighted ... Whatever they're doing at WBT has got to strengthen our position in the strictly adult market." Rich Pauley and Arthur Smith moved from WBT to WSOC.

In 1974, Lee Morris of sister station WSB in Atlanta became general manager, and the station began making more of an effort to attract listeners with contests and promotions.

=== Carolina Basketball Network ===
In the early 1960s, WSOC made the first serious attempt to produce and network the basketball games of the University of North Carolina at Chapel Hill Tar Heels beyond the immediate area of Chapel Hill, Raleigh, and Durham. Bill Currie did the play-by-play announcing, and Jack Callaghan provided color commentary. The games aired in Chapel Hill on WCHL. Cox sold the network to the Village Broadcasting Company, owner of WCHL, in 1965.

=== NewsRadio 93 ===
On August 16, 1976, WSOC dropped its music programming to become "NewsRadio 93," airing an all-news radio format. It was the first in the Carolinas to do so. News director Cameron Keyser said the local news staff would increase from six to 10, and that the station would be an affiliate of NBC Radio's News and Information Service (NIS) WSOC would have 10 minutes of local news per hour and 40 minutes of local news during drive time and midday.

When NBC dropped that service in 1977, WSOC remained all-news, adding local news personnel in the process. Popular newscasters on WSOC in those days included Jim Cundiff (air name Jim David) and the first female news director in North Carolina Leslie Wolfe (who married Cundiff while they worked as the morning drive news co-anchor team). Overnights, the station carried The Larry King Show from the Mutual Broadcasting System, and eventually Mutual's radio newscasts found their way into the daytime news programming of the station.

=== The Voice of Charlotte ===
WSOC's programming made a shift in 1978, as all-news programming was replaced in middays by a local talk show hosted by Dick Pomerantz. His hosting of the midday talk show was short lived, but other talk shows, both local and network, made their way to WSOC over the next four years. In addition to Pomerantz, popular talk hosts on the station included WCCB-TV afternoon children's host Tony Alexi. WSOC carried an extensive schedule of Atlanta Braves baseball games and North Carolina State University football and basketball.

=== AM 93-WSOC ===
By 1981, the decision was made to drop news and talk programming on WSOC, and the station went to an Adult standards music format ("The music that never goes out of style"). In an effort to retain its heritage, but differentiate the station from its Country-formatted sister station WSOC-FM, the station was branded in slogans and jingles as "AM 93-WSOC". The Larry King Show was retained overnights, and was joined for a time by a network sports-talk operation called Enterprise Radio. Popular announcers during this time included Jim Hutton, Ed Ross, Jim Wall and Mike Sheridan.

Three years later, former WBT program director Andy Bickel was hired as consultant and took the station into an Adult contemporary format. The format was not competitive with the other stations in Charlotte established in this format, and was abandoned early in 1985.

=== Country music and WSOC-FM simulcasts ===
WSOC's owners then tried to find a place for AM 93 within the established bounds of country music that WSOC-FM had carved out in their then-16 years in the format. At times, AM-93 was programmed separately in midday and evening hours, and simulcast the FM during morning and afternoon drive times.

WSOC's AM station began an experimental Country Oldies format dubbed "Country Gold 93", once again with a separate staff from the FM except during overnight hours. Morning announcer during this time was Jim Wall. Though it showed promise for gaining a toehold with the country audience in Charlotte, the owners abandoned the format early in 1986, except for Janet King's midday show, when the AM's ratings began to weaken, and WSOC AM-93 permanently became the shadowed sister of WSOC-FM.

=== Baseball ===
WSOC aired the Major League Baseball Atlanta Braves prior to 1986, when the station added the Class AA Charlotte O's baseball team. The station would continue to air a CBS radio major league baseball game of the week, the All-Star Game, and post-season games. The O's changed their name to the Knights in the 1988 season and in 1989, in addition to the Knights, WSOC planned to air 99 Chicago Cubs games, plus 25 games each from the Braves, the Baltimore Orioles and the Minnesota Twins.

=== Time for a change? ===
By the end of the 1980s, the only separate programming on WSOC AM-93 was college football and basketball, minor league baseball, and Sunday morning religious programming. One interesting innovation attempted during this period was to play music on WSOC while NASCAR races were being aired on WSOC-FM.

In 1990, the owners Cox Communications began to court a buyer for the 930 frequency, and in late 1991, it was announced that 930 AM was to be sold to the Bible Broadcasting Network. Cox also sold WSOC-FM to EZ Communications (which, after a series of mergers in the mid-to-late 1990s, is now owned by Beasley Broadcasting), but still owns WSOC-TV to this day.

The format change came on March 16, 1992.

== Callsign: WYFQ ==
=== BBN Comes to Charlotte ===
The original construction permit for 93.5 FM was obtained by Risden Lyon and his son, Allen Lyon in 1989. Risden Lyon died on December 31, 1991, and Allen carried on with the licensing process for another four years, obtaining the final construction permit for WRPL in 1995. He constructed the station in the summer of 1995, and sold it to the Bible Broadcasting Network in February 1996.

WYFQ-FM officially signed on the air on February 12, 1996. The station airs the complete national program and music schedule of BBN, plus locally produced public affairs programming and public service announcements.

Popular announcers on the BBN Network include Mike Dize, Hank Farrior and Vic Gregory.

As a BBN station, no commercial advertisements are broadcast. Funding is raised from listener donations.

When BBN began a Spanish-language radio network, known as "Red de Radiodifusión Bíblica." Some of its programming was aired on WYFQ. Programming on the station later returned to full-time English broadcasts.

Three months after purchasing the station, the entire operation of BBN moved from Chesapeake, Virginia, to Charlotte, making WYFQ the flagship station for the network.

The station now broadcasts from the BBN Studios at 11530 Carmel Commons Boulevard in Charlotte.

Its operation was combined with BBN's already established Charlotte AM station as WYFQ AM and FM. Today, the combined stations share a station manager and the entire technical staff of BBN's English broadcast contributes to their operation.

In June 2026, WYFQ-FM changed its calls to WYHG. WLNK, which BBN purchased in 2026, became WYFQ-FM.
