= WYFQ-FM =

Coordinates: 35.272°N 80.765°W

- Indian Trail, North Carolina; United States
- Broadcast area: Metrolina
- Frequency: 100.9 MHz (HD Radio)
- Branding: BBN Radio

Ownership
- Owner: Bible Broadcasting Network
- Sister stations: WYFQ, WYHG

History
- First air date: February 1, 1958; 68 years ago
- Former call signs: WABZ-FM (1958–2004); WPZS (2004–2012); WQNC (2012–2015); WPZS (2015-2025); WLNK-FM (2025-2026)
- Call sign meaning: Where You Find Quality

Technical information
- Licensing authority: FCC
- Facility ID: 52553
- Class: A
- ERP: 5,200 watts
- HAAT: 107 meters (351 ft)

Links
- Public license information: Public file; LMS

WYFQ-FM (100.9 FM) is a Christian radio station serving the Charlotte, North Carolina, metropolitan area, licensed to Indian Trail. The station is currently owned and operated by Bible Broadcasting Network alongside their two flagship stations WYFQ and WYHG. The transmitter site is in Matthews near the intersection of NC 51 and Monroe Road.

== History ==
The station began broadcasting at 5:30 a.m. on February 1, 1958 as WABZ-FM, acting largely as the FM simulcast of WABZ. It was the first FM station to serve Albemarle, North Carolina and surrounding Stanly County.

Ted Bell hosted "Saturday Night Music Machine" while at WABZ-FM, interviewing Neil Sedaka, Debbie Reynolds, Freddie Cannon, George Burns, Phil Everly, Teresa Brewer, Tiny Tim, and Gene McDaniels. The show, which Bell hosted until 1982, featured stars such as Bobby Rydell and Chubby Checker. Johnny Olson of The Price Is Right recorded station IDs for WABZ-FM at Bell's behest.

On December 28, 1993, Bill and Susi Norman, owners of WZKY and WXLX, bought WABZ-FM from Piedmont Crescent Communications through their company Jenni Communications, Inc.

"Inspiration 100.9" played "Southern Gospel Music of today, yesterday and all the favorites", along with the Trading Post, local sports and ministry programs. Johnny Caudle hosted the morning show from 1995 until 2000.

In 2004, WABZ moved to its current city of license and changed its letters and format, giving grade A signal quality to the Charlotte area. Radio One, Inc. announced on November 16 that it had purchased WPZS for $11.5 million and moved it to the company's Charlotte facilities. The company already operated WPZS under an LMA earlier in the month, changing the format to Urban contemporary gospel.

On August 31, 2011, Radio One announced its intention to sell off their Charlotte stations to Davis Broadcasting, but in April 2012, the deal fell through and Radio One decided to keep the stations.

On September 13, 2012, at Midnight, WPZS began simulcasting sister WQNC. WQNC and WPZS also swapped call letters on the same day. The two stations provided a strong combined signal with 60 percent overlap. The simulcast ended on August 14, 2015, with 100.9 reverting to the callsign WPZS.

WPZS carried the syndicated Yolanda Adams Morning Show.

On December 11, 2025, multiple stations in the Charlotte area changed formats and call letters. This included moving the call sign and hot adult contemporary format, previously at 107.9 FM, to this station, which became WLNK-FM. ln addition, this station's "Praise" format and WPZS call letters were moved to 610 AM, its translator W273DA at 102.5 FM, and also the HD-2 channel of WOSF.

On January 24, 2026, WLNK-FM applied for a power increase which would change the station from Class A to Class C3 and a change in the city of license to Weddington, North Carolina.

On March 30, 2026, Bible Broadcasting Network announced it would buy WLNK from Urban One, who had chosen to sell off their "Mix" duo of stations, for $4.2 million; Urban One has requested to retain the WLNK callsign. The hot adult contemporary format ended on May 31, 2026 at Midnight, signing off with "Killer Queen" by 5 Seconds of Summer. In June 2026, WLNK changed its calls to WYFQ-FM and WYFQ-FM became WYHG.
