= Add Penfield =

American sports radio broadcaster

Addison Pierce Penfield (1918–2010), a pioneer in North Carolina sports radio, was the original radio "Voice of the Blue Devils".

A native of Meriden, Connecticut, Penfield moved to North Carolina to become a Duke University student in 1938. At the behest of famed Duke football coach Wallace Wade, the Atlantic Radio Network gave Penfield the opportunity to broadcast games while he was still a student. It was the beginning of a career in radio that spanned eight decades.

Penfield graduated from Duke University in 1940. After a two-year duty with Army radio, he served in a number of diverse radio markets before receiving the call to return to Duke in 1952.

He was the "Voice of the Duke Blue Devils" from 1952 to 1976. Bob Harris served as his color commentator and the two broadcast both Duke football and Duke basketball men's basketball games. Facing health problems, Penfield retired in 1976 and was succeeded by Harris, who became the new "Voice of the Blue Devils". Now on his 35th year, Harris has become synonymous with the moniker. Still, Harris credits Penfield for leading the way: “He has been a beacon for all of us in the broadcast industry.”

In 1954, Penfield was named North Carolina's most outstanding sportscaster. Penfield was inducted into the North Carolina Sports Hall of Fame in 2005.
