= Red de Radiodifusión Bíblica =

Radio station

Coordinates: 35.087009°N 80.842207°W

Red de Radiodifusión Bíblica is a religious, Spanish-language radio network operated by the Charlotte, North Carolina–based Bible Broadcasting Network.

The programming of this network is primarily directed toward people living in Latin-American countries, although some U.S. radio stations in states bordering Mexico also broadcast the network.
