= WSPC =

- Albemarle, North Carolina; United States
- Frequency: 1010 kHz
- Branding: Newstalk 107.3 & 1010

Programming
- Format: Talk radio
- Affiliations: Premiere Networks; Westwood One; Fox News Radio; Tar Heel Sports Network; Carolina Panthers Radio Network

Ownership
- Owner: Stanly Communications
- Sister stations: WZKY

History
- First air date: July 15, 1947
- Former call signs: WABZ (1946–1979); WWWX (1979–1990); WXLX (1990–1994)
- Call sign meaning: We Serve Pfeiffer College (former call sign for Pfeiffer College's station)

Technical information
- Licensing authority: FCC
- Facility ID: 49041
- Class: D
- Power: 1,000 watts day 64 watts night
- Transmitter coordinates: 35°22′40.00″N 80°11′38.00″W
- Translator: 107.3 W297CE (Albemarle)

Links
- Public license information: Public file; LMS
- Webcast: Listen live
- Website: Official website

WSPC (1010 AM) is a commercial radio station in Albemarle, North Carolina. It broadcasts a talk radio format and is owned by Stanly Communications. The radio studios and transmitter are on Magnolia Street in Albemarle.

By day, WSPC transmits with 1,000 watts, using a non-directional antenna, but because AM 1010 is a Canadian clear channel frequency, WSPC must reduce power at night to 64 watts to avoid interference. Programming is also heard on 250-watt FM translator W297CE at 107.3 MHz.

== History ==
The station signed on at 5:30 p.m. on July 15, 1947 as WABZ, with broadcasts originating from the Albemarle Hotel. A planned opening the weekend prior was delayed due to a lightning strike causing a short circuit between the antenna and tower.

A 19-year-old Robert D. Raiford was program director at the station's launch.

While a student of Pfeiffer College in March 1949, longtime WFMY-TV personality Lee Kinard went to work at WABZ doing janitorial and filing duties. Later he became a DJ and producer. Kinard left Pfeiffer after one year and became a part owner of the station in 1952, along with station manager Bill Page, attorney Staton Williams, chiropractor Joe Ivester and farmer Keith Almond. Kinard left WABZ for WFMY in 1956.

WABZ launched its FM counterpart, WABZ-FM, at 100.9 MHz in February 1958.

The station changed its calls to WWWX on September 10, 1979. On February 15, 1990, the station changed its call sign to WXLX and on August 26, 1994 to the current WSPC.

In April 1993, Bill and Susi Norman bought WXLX, which had gone off the air in November 1990. This was one of the first purchases of a second AM in the same community by the same owner. At first, WXLX simulcast the couple's other station, WZKY. Bill Norman was a Pfeiffer graduate who got his training at the college's station WSPC. Since the letters had become available, he put them on his station.

== Programming ==
Weekdays begin with a local news and information show hosted by Dave Andrews. A tradio show, known as "The Trading Post," follows. The rest of the weekday schedule is made up of nationally syndicated talk shows from Glenn Beck, Sean Hannity, Mark Levin and Coast to Coast AM with George Noory. Most hours begin with world and national news from Fox News Radio.

WSPC carries Carolina Panthers NFL football. It also airs University of North Carolina Tar Heels football and basketball, as well as Duke University sports. Local high school football games are broadcast on Friday nights in the fall.
