= WCHL (AM) =

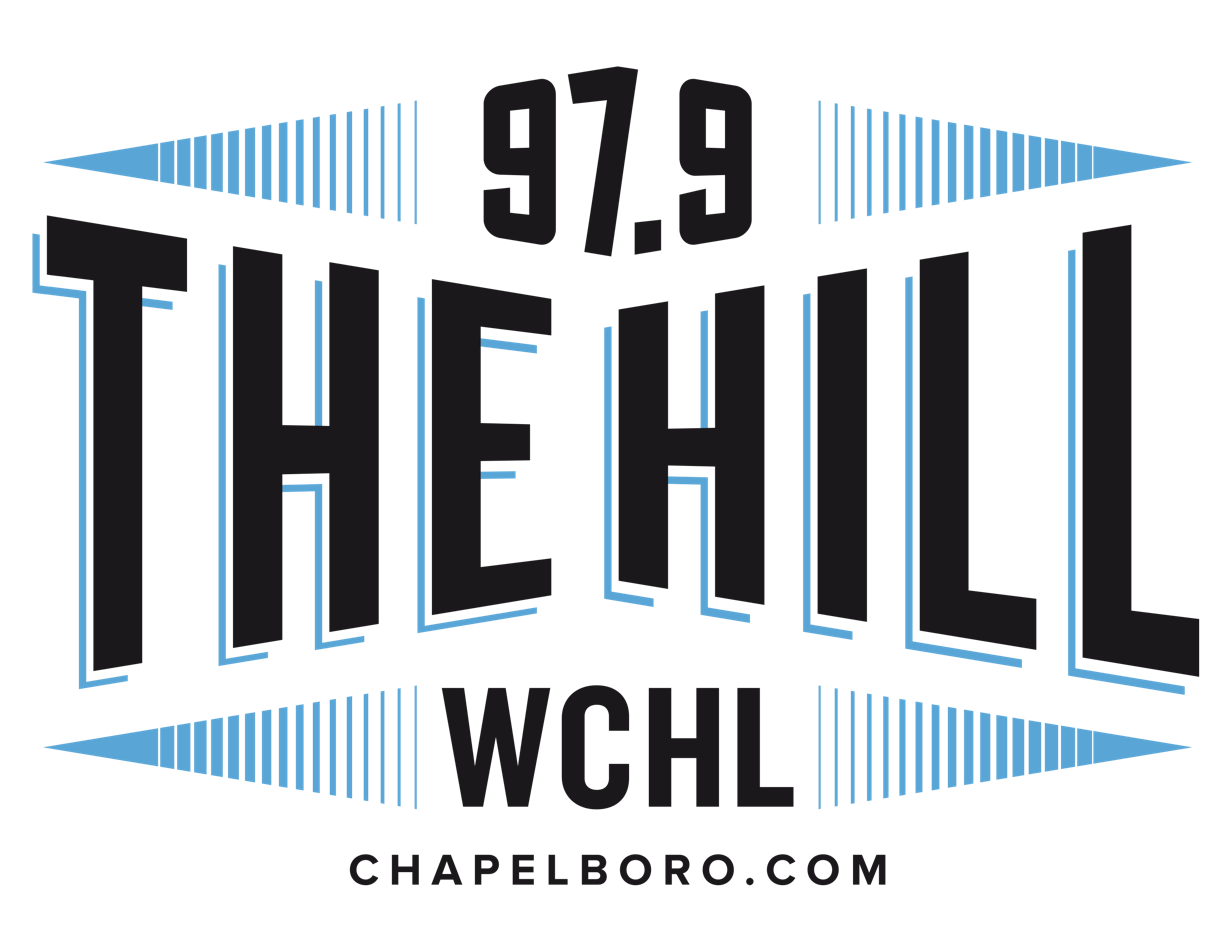
- Chapel Hill, North Carolina; United States
- Broadcast area: Chapel Hill–Carrboro
- Frequency: 1360 kHz
- Branding: 97.9 The Hill

Programming
- Format: News/talk; sports; adult album alternative
- Network: ABC News Radio
- Affiliations: North Carolina Tar Heels; Westwood One

Ownership
- Owner: Chapel Hill Media Group, LLC

History
- First air date: January 25, 1953; 73 years ago
- Call sign meaning: Chapel Hill

Technical information
- Licensing authority: FCC
- Facility ID: 70191
- Class: B
- Power: 5,000 watts day; 1,000 watts night
- Transmitter coordinates: 35°56′18.52″N 79°1′35.04″W
- Translator: 97.9 W250BP (Chapel Hill)

Links
- Public license information: Public file; LMS
- Webcast: Listen live
- Website: www.chapelboro.com

WCHL (1360 kHz) is a commercial AM radio station in Chapel Hill, North Carolina. It is owned by the Chapel Hill Media Group and it has a format of news, talk, sports and adult album alternative music. It is a network affiliate of ABC News Radio. Much of its programming is geared towards the Chapel Hill–Carrboro community, with a focus on local news and community-affairs programming. The studios are at 1525 East Franklin Street in Chapel Hill.

By day, WCHL transmits with 5,000 watts non-directional, but to protect other stations on 1360 AM from interference, at night it reduces power to 1,000 watts and uses a directional antenna. Programming is also heard on 250-watt FM translator W250BP at 97.9 MHz in Chapel Hill.

== History ==
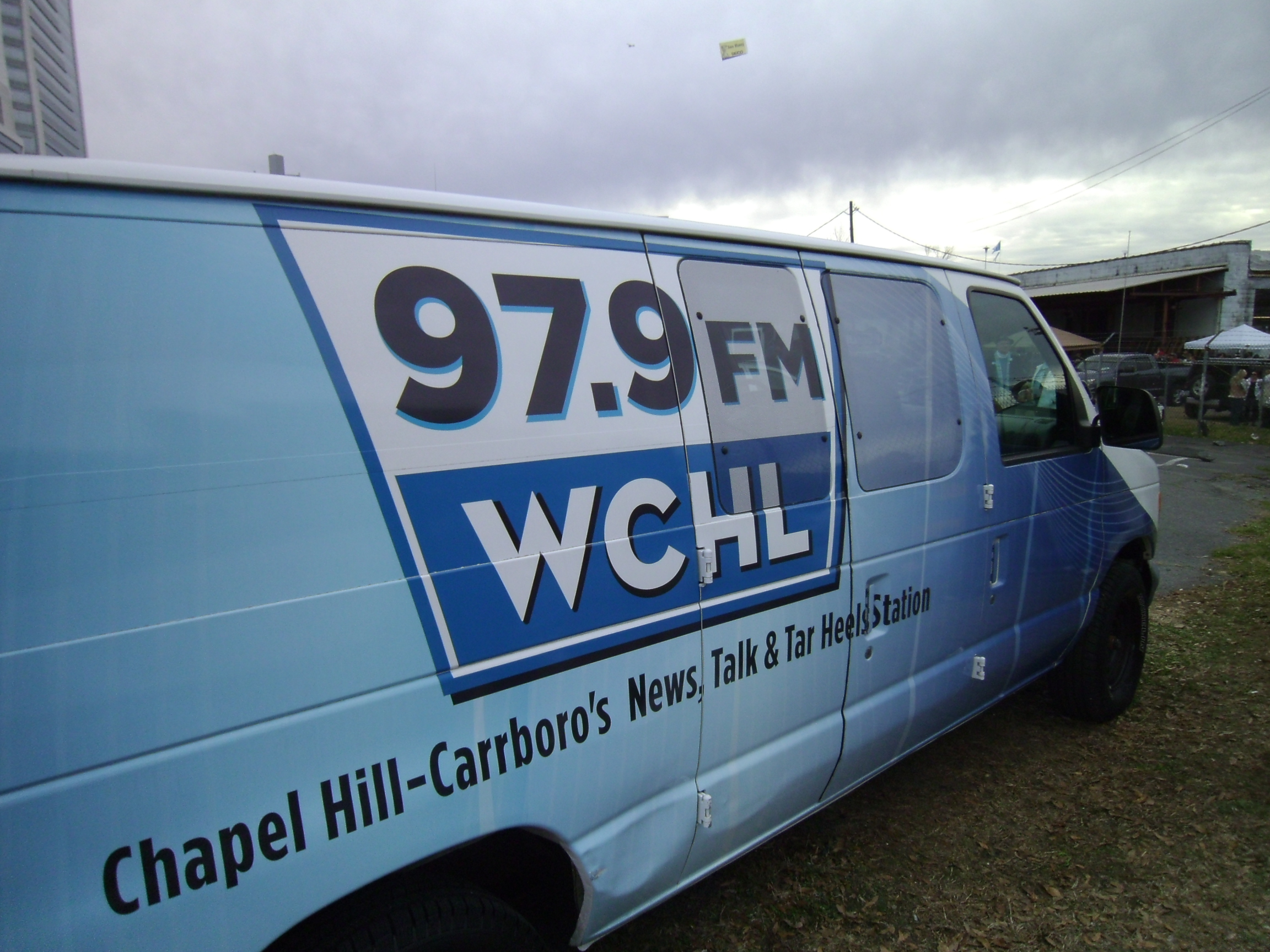
A broadcast van for WCHL at the 2013 Belk Bowl

Chapel Hill's oldest continuous broadcaster signed on the air on January 25, 1953. WCHL was owned by Sandy McClamroch, who went on to become the town's longest-serving mayor. Originally a 1,000-watt station, the station boosted its daytime power to 5,000 watts in 1978. WCHL served as the launching point for the Village Broadcasting Companies, which bought Burlington's WBAG-FM in 1983, moving it to Raleigh as WZZU (now WNCB "B93.9").

Over the years, the station developed a loyal following for being highly community-oriented. The WCHL news department brought home many Associated Press awards and launched the career of several nationally renowned journalists and sports broadcasters. Charles Kuralt and Jim Lampley began their broadcast careers at WCHL while students at the University of North Carolina. Larry Keith, a long-time assistant managing editor and writer at Sports Illustrated, and creator of SI Kids, got his start at WCHL also while a student at UNC.

In the fall of 1968, WCHL, in association with advertising clients Coca Cola and Yates Motor Company, ran a promotion in which the key to a 1969 Plymouth Barracuda was hidden somewhere in Chapel Hill. Clues were broadcast each day until someone found the key. People swarmed over public and private property resulting in trespassing and damage in some cases, particularly to the shrubbery around the Bell Tower on the UNC campus. The university was not happy, and as a result it was rumored that the FCC tightened and clarified its on-air contest rules as a direct effect of the contest.

WCHL played Top 40 music, and later adult contemporary before going to a news/talk format in the early 1990s.

In 1997, The Village Companies (now Vilcom) sold WCHL to the Raleigh-based Curtis Media Group for $400,000. Curtis moved WCHL's operations to the WDNC studios at the Durham Bulls Athletic Park. It ended the highly acclaimed local news and community-driven talk for an automated adult standards and oldies format, limited news and a simulcast morning show with co-located WDNC. However, in 2002, Vilcom regained control of its former property's sales and programming under a local marketing agreement (LMA). Vilcom moved the station back to Chapel Hill and returned the station's format to local news and talk on November 25, 2002, just two months before the station celebrated its 50th anniversary in 2003. In June 2004, Vilcom bought the station back from Curtis Media Group for $775,000.

Vilcom's longtime owner, Jim Heavner, sold a minority stake in WCHL to Barry Leffler, former president of WNCN in Raleigh, in late 2009. By this time WCHL had a progressive talk format, using programming from Air America. Leffler became the station's CEO and managing partner. Heavner remained as chairman. Under Leffler, WCHL added more local news, an FM signal, and the Chapelboro web site.

On January 21, 2010, WCHL's network Air America filed for Chapter 7 bankruptcy and ceased live programming the same night. Reruns of Air America's programming continued to air until Monday, January 25 at 9 p.m..

WCHL's logo from 2002-2012

In 2014, Leffler, who had run WCHL since 2009, left the station for Tenet Healthcare in Dallas, Texas.

In August 2015, WCHL was purchased by Leslie Rudd who brought in several local investors, Chris Ehrenfeld, Jim Kitchen and Mark Vitali to form Chapel Hill Media Group, LLC. Soon after, the station switched formats to incorporate music along with its lineup of live shows each weekday morning and afternoon. It plays adult album alternative music, giving WCHL a more diverse playlist than most formats.

At the end of 2016 WCHL moved to University Place and re-branded as "97.9 The Hill WCHL". It became known for continuing the tradition of community programming by providing local news, neighborhood events and high school sports, along with its music programming. Its website is Chapelboro.com, a daily local news source for Chapel Hill and the surrounding area.

Ron Stutts retired on December 18, 2020, after 43 years as morning host. His show was replaced in 2021 by "This Morning with Aaron Keck", while news director Brighton McConnell took over Keck's afternoon shift.

On July 6, 2025, severe damage at the transmitter site, due to flooding from the remnants of Tropical Storm Chantal, took WCHL off the air. The station received temporary permission to continue broadcasting exclusively over its translator relay, W250BP, at 97.9 FM. On August 4, WCHL received permission to resume operation with a reduced power of 4 watts.

On June 26, 2026, both WCHL and the Chapelboro website were sold to Chapelboro Media Group LLC.

== Sports programming ==
WCHL was a longtime flagship station of North Carolina Tar Heels football and basketball. Vilcom was the rights holder for Tar Heel sports until selling them to Learfield Communications in the early 21st century, and Heavner was Woody Durham's color commentator on Tar Heel broadcasts for 18 years.

Until his retirement, Ron Stutts, the station's morning drive-time host from 1977 until his retirement in 2020, hosted an hour-long pregame show before the Tar Heel Sports Network begins its coverage. Football pregame coverage is now provided by Inside Carolina's Tommy Ashley and Joey Powell.

In 2022, UNC moved its Research Triangle-area affiliation to 680 WPTF Raleigh. The deal made WPTF the network's new flagship, though WCHL remains as an affiliate station. WCHL continues as the exclusive home for Tar Heel baseball and women's basketball.

WCHL also airs high school sports.

== Transmission ==
WCHL's 5,000-watt non-directional daytime signal cuts back to 1,000 watts directional toward the southeast at sunset. The station has continuously broadcast from its two-tower array on Franklin Street, noticeable for being emblazoned with metal call letters on one tower and its frequency on the other.

In 2012, WCHL expanded to the FM band by acquiring a translator station from Liberty University in Virginia. The station, previously licensed to Creedmoor, North Carolina, at 98.5 FM, moved to Chapel Hill and to 97.9 MHz. The call sign is W250BP. The translator is intended to improve nighttime reception of the station and to allow listeners who prefer FM radio to tune in. In the fall of 2012, WCHL rebranded itself as 97.9 WCHL, while retaining its AM 1360 signal.

Broadcast translator for WCHL
Call sign	Frequency	City of license	FID	ERP (W)	HAAT	Class	Transmitter coordinates	FCC info
W250BP	97.9 FM	Chapel Hill, North Carolina	147280	250	330.9 m (1,086 ft)	D	35°52′16.5″N 79°9′39″W	LMS

== Chapelboro ==
Using materials produced by its news team, WCHL owns and operates the online local newspaper Chapelboro.
