= Rams Club =

Athletic sponsor and scholarship club

The Educational Foundation, Inc.
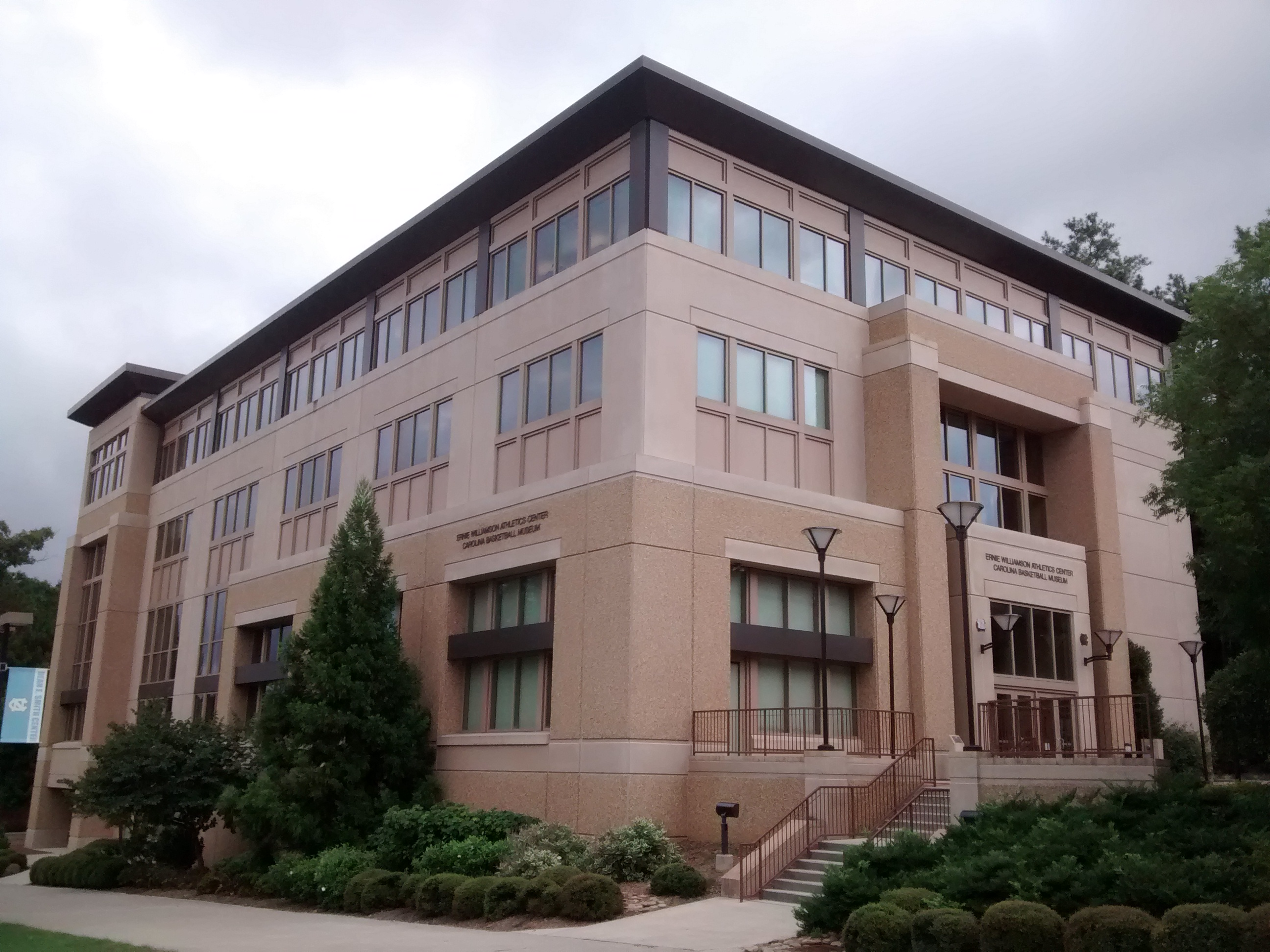
- Ernie Williamson Athletics Center, location of The Rams Club
- Founded: December 7, 1938
- Type: Educational Charity
- Tax ID no.: 56-6058412
- Location: Chapel Hill, NC
- Coordinates: 35°54′00″N 79°2′40″W
- Region served: North Carolina, United States
- Members: c. 17,000
- Employees: 41
- Website: ramsclub.com

The Educational Foundation, Inc., better known as The Rams Club is the athletic booster club and scholarship organization of the North Carolina Tar Heels at the University of North Carolina at Chapel Hill. The Rams Club was founded on December 7, 1938 and has approximately 17,000 members as of November, 2019. It is based at the Williamson Athletics Center, located next to the Dean E. Smith Center, named for former executive director Ernie Williamson.
