= Dean Smith Center =

Multi-purpose arena in Chapel Hill, North Carolina

Dean E. Smith Student Activities Center
- The Dean Dome, Dean E. Smith Center, & The Smith Center
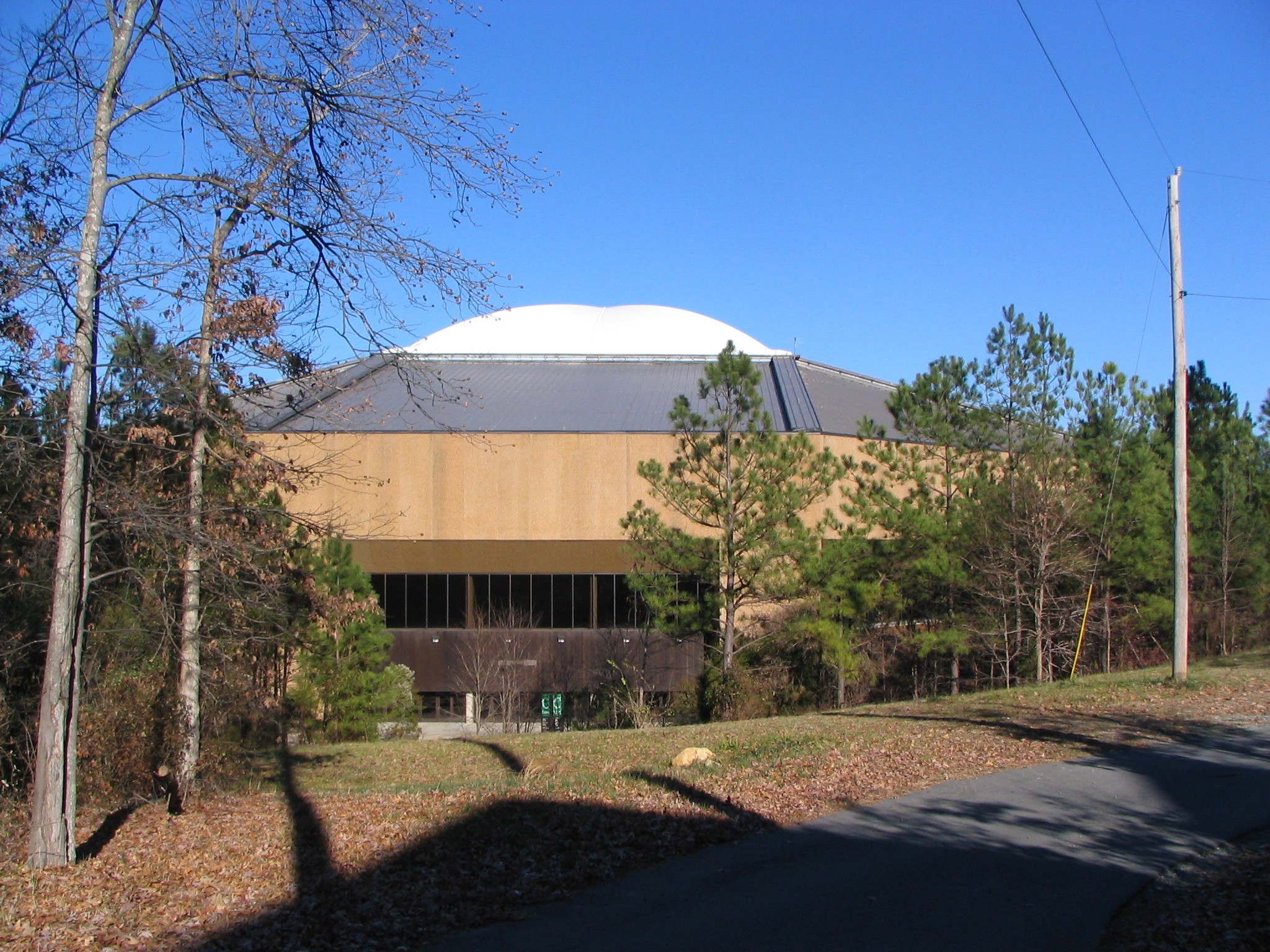
- Interactive map of Dean E. Smith Student Activities Center
- Full name: Dean E. Smith Student Activities Center
- Address: 300 Skipper Bowles Drive
- Location: Chapel Hill, North Carolina
- Coordinates: 35°53′59″N 79°2′38″W
- Owner: University of North Carolina
- Operator: University of North Carolina
- Capacity: 21,750
- Surface: Hardwood

Construction
- Groundbreaking: April 17, 1982
- Opened: January 18, 1986
- Renovated: 2005, 2018
- Expanded: 1992, 2000
- Cost: $33.8 million
- Architects: Hakan/Corley & Associates; Finch-Heery
- Structural engineer: Geiger Berger
- Services engineers: Henderson Engineers, Inc.
- General contractor: Paul Howard Construction

Tenants
- North Carolina Tar Heels (NCAA); Men's basketball (1986–present); Women's basketball (2008–2010)

The Dean E. Smith Student Activities Center (commonly known as the Dean Smith Center, Smith Center, or the Dean Dome) is a multi-purpose arena in Chapel Hill, North Carolina, used primarily as the home for the University of North Carolina at Chapel Hill Tar Heels men's basketball team. The university began to inquire about building a standalone arena for the men's basketball team beginning in the mid-1970s, but due to an ongoing university wide investigation, the fundraiser halted until its conclusion. In June 1980, the fundraising began with a goal of at least $30 million and a target completion date for the building of December 1984. It was initially planned to be called the Student Activities Center; however, after its announcement it began to be referred to as The Dean Dome and it was speculated it would be named for then coach Dean Smith. The fundraising concluded in August 1984 with over $33 million raised, but construction would not be finished until 1986. The day before the opening game on January 18, 1986, against the Duke Blue Devils, the building was officially announced to be named the Dean E. Smith Student Activities Center, while a formal dedication happened later in September. In 2018, the hardwood floor of the Smith Center was named for then coach Roy Williams.

Land was cleared in a wooded ravine on the southern part of campus and necessitated 20,000 cubic yards (15,000 m^{3}) of rock to be dynamited out. The building is 300,000 square feet (28,000 m^{2}), built on 8 acres (3.2 ha) and contains three levels. There are two levels for seating, an upper and lower level, from which the furthest viewing distance is 675 feet (206 m). The Dean Dome has been renovated several times since its opening which has included the likes of new video boards, video ribbon along the upper level edge, seats, lighting, and sound. In addition, the locker rooms and office space have all been upgraded. Throughout the years the capacity has been adjusted through the removal of box seating for traditional seating and the addition of a standing student section behind one of the goals. The future of the arena is questioned due to a variety of issues stemming from a narrow concourse, limited storage, and a desire to have premium seating to earn more revenue. The issue is further complicated by the fact the Smith Center was privately funded and the seats paid for by the initial donors carry two full generations, which limits any possible renovation, but could be circumvented by building a new arena.

Through the 2025–26 season, the Tar Heels have played 41 seasons in the Dean Smith Center and have earned over 500 victories and under 100 losses. Despite their home success, the crowd has often been criticized for being dull and un–involved, which has been credited to the seating arrangement created by the above–mentioned donors which has limited the ability of the students to use the lower level and create noise. In addition to basketball, the venue has been used to host several concerts, graduations, sporting events, and a speech by Barack Obama when campaigning for the Democratic presidential nomination.

== Background and history ==
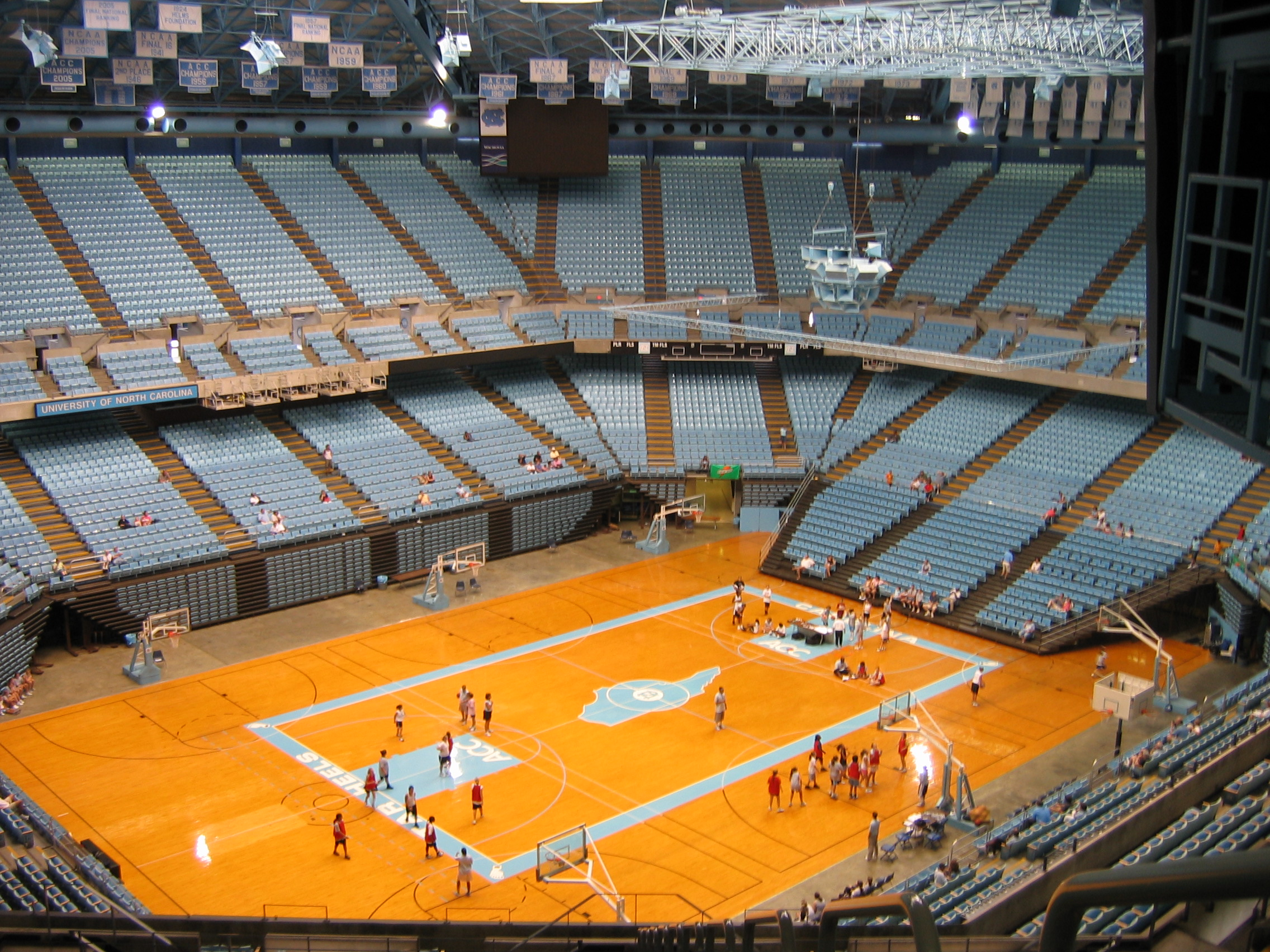
The inside of the Dean E. Smith Student Activities Center pictured during Summer 2006.

After the Tar Heels won the national championship in 1957, there were thoughts of building a big venue for the Tar Heels to play basketball in. However, when the state refused to fund a completely new arena, Carmichael Auditorium was built as an annex to Woollen Gymnasium and the Tar Heels began to play there in 1965-66 season. During the mid-1970s, the university began to investigate building a self-standing arena. However, the university was in the middle of a fundraising campaign called the Carolina Challenge and Chancellor Ferebee Taylor and the board of trustees did not want a campaign to build a venue to compete with the school campaign. When the Carolina Challenge ended in 1979, work on the new arena began again when a 25-member committee was created to head the project. The building was designed to be used for the men's basketball team, graduations, concerts, and exhibits.

Smith stated publicly "We all know that we can use that money better to help the University," while later in his memoir he also noted that "when you can't get a ticket, that's the best situation for a program." Smith later agreed for the new building as it would allow more students to attend. According to architect Glenn Corley, assistant coach Bill Guthridge hoped the new arena would be "big enough so that everyone who wanted to go to a game could get in, and there wouldn't be one guy outside waiting." Future ACC Commissioner John Swofford, Hargove "Skipper" Bowles, and executive Rams Club director Ernie Williamson anchored the fundraising efforts which officially started in May 1980 for a goal of at least $30 million. (Note: The initial goal to be raised varies based on sources: $30 million and $32 million.) Bowles convinced Smith to assist the fundraising, as there were fears it would not succeed without his participation. They hosted many Rams Club and alumni meetings around the state, where they presented a model of the building while Smith and Bowles spoke to the attendees. Swofford stated during the campaign: "The key factor, of course, was the job that Dean has done with basketball here and the respect people hold for his program." A proposition was made to the student body for a fee increase to be applied to help cover building costs and that increase would maintain the seating arrangements as they were in Carmichael, but it was voted down.

Following the Tar Heels' victory in the 1982 NCAA championship game, donations increased, which Rams Club vice president Neal Harrell stated "couldn't have come at a better time..." On April 17, 1982, after half the desired amount had been raised, ground was broken for the venue, with a target finish date of December 1984. On the first day of construction, contractors were banned from wearing Duke or N.C. State apparel on the job site for the duration of the build. Donations again increased significantly in 1984 when exact seating was being determined.

Harrell stated that any donations over $5,000 secured the life-long right to purchase seats at the venue, while a gift over $10,000 would grant tickets for two generations. Lifetime tickets for two generations meant guaranteed tickets for the lifetime of the donor and their oldest child's. As donations increased the quality and quantity of seats improved and parking spots would be included. The effort spanned six years and included 2,362 donors. Donations ranged from $1 to $1 million. Each donor's name is located on a brass and granite plaque in 3/8-inch letters near the venue's north, main entrance. The campaign ended on August 1, 1984, and the total amount donated was over $33 million. (Note: The amount that was raised varied based on sources: $33 million, $33.8 million, $34 million, $34.8 million, $35 million, and over $36 million.) The completion date was pushed back further to March 1985 and again until the season opener in 1985 against UCLA. Upon completion of the campaign, this became the first privately funded on-campus venue for basketball.

Prior to the first game, the Student Activities center began to be referred to as the "Dean Dome," which is a play on Coach Smith and the fiber-glass dome on the arena. Regarding the venue's nickname, Smith one time remarked that "It makes me sound bald." A black-tie dinner was held in the building on January 17, 1986, to honor the university's Arts and Sciences Foundation. At the dinner, Chancellor Christopher C. Fordham III announced the building was to be named the Dean E. Smith Student Activities Center because "We are a better university and a better state because he is one of us." The opening game on January 18, 1986, featured the No. 1 North Carolina Tar Heels against rival and No. 3 overall Duke Blue Devils on national television. Before the game, there was a ceremonial jump ball between the two teams to open the building. The first basket was scored by Duke's Mark Alarie, while the first Tar Heel who scored was Warren Martin off a dunk. During the a timeout in the game, a banner was unfurled that read "Dean's Dome – The Tradition Continues." The Tar Heels won the game 95–92. A formal dedication of the arena for Coach Smith happened on September 6, 1986, when a pro-alumni game was held which featured the likes of Lennie Rosenbluth, Michael Jordan, James Worthy, and many more alumni of the basketball program.

Due to renovations going on at their home venue, Carmichael, the women's basketball team played their home games for the 2008–09 and 2009–10 seasons at the Dean Smith Center. The hardwood floor of the Dean Smith Center was named for head coach Roy Williams on August 24, 2018, thus becoming the Roy Williams Court. Williams on the honor stated "It's very hard to believe; it's just so flattering," and wanted to thank his former and current players "because they made the plays." The dedication happened during a reunion of the basketball team.

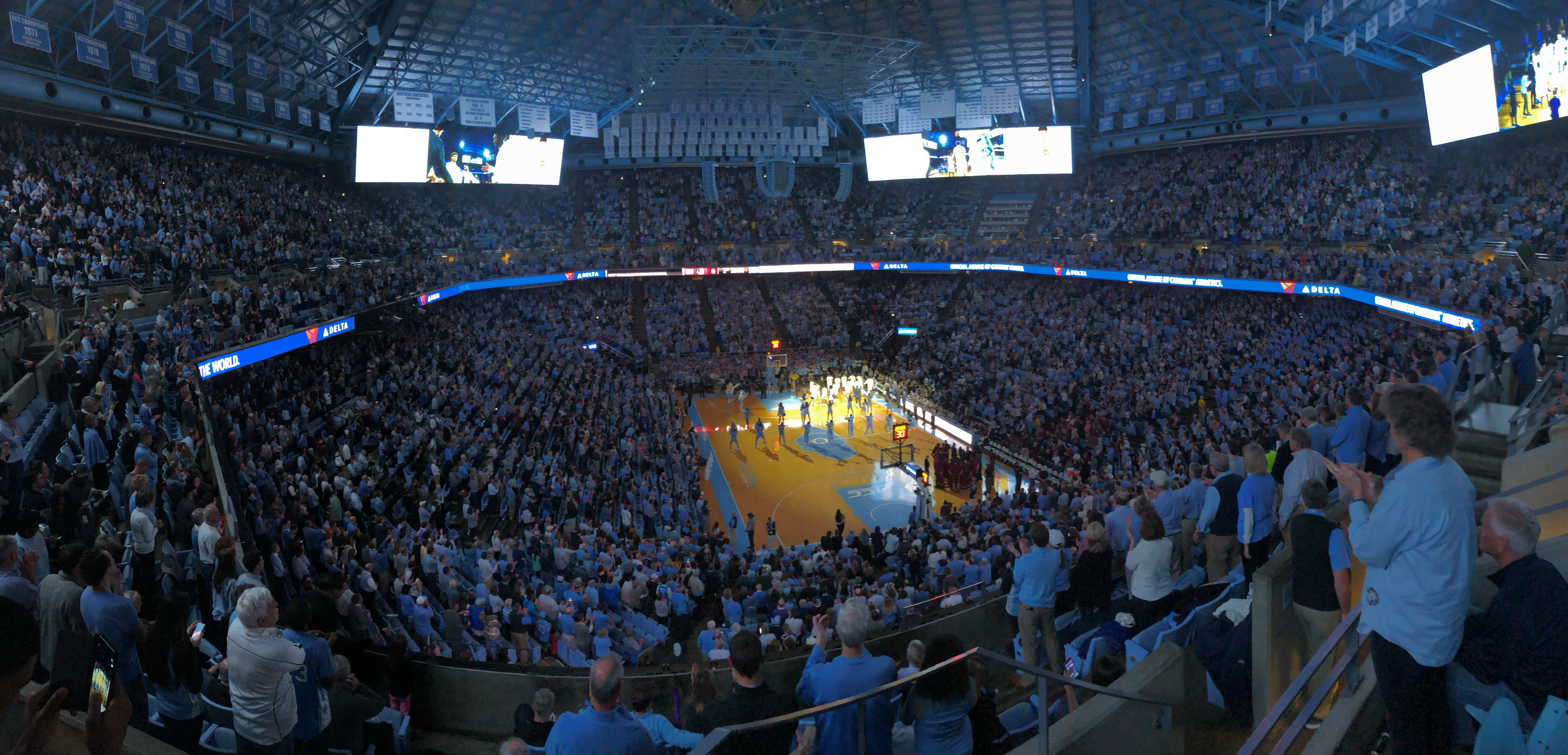
North Carolina hosts Florida State in an ACC Men's Basketball conference game on February 23, 2019.

== Architecture and renovations ==
The land for the Smith Center is located on south campus in a wooded ravine near US 15-501 and Mason Farm Road. To make room for the structure, more than 20,000 cubic yards (15,000 m^{3}) of rock needed to be dynamited out, along with 150,000 cubic feet (4,200 m^{3}) of dirt. However, this was not completed due to the excessive blasting required for the west side, leading to a semi-circular shape of the ground floor. This led to storage and production issues almost immediately. The entire arena is 380' long by 340' wide and 140' high, with three levels. In total, the arena is 300,000 square feet (28,000 m^{2}) spread across 8 acres (3.2 ha) of land. The roof is 15,000 square feet (1,400 m^{2}) and is skylighted. The farthest view from seat to court is 675 feet (206 m). The court itself is maplewood and seven inches thick. The venue included 20 boxes near the top of the lower level for the larger donors; however, the large donors to the stadium wished for court-side seating. Due to poor views from the boxes, these areas were converted into normal seating years later. The venue's 68 rows all feed into the 1,200' long and 22' wide concourse that features several concession stands and vendors. Hanging over the court is a grid that allows for sound and lighting equipment to be hung. The architects for the project were Chapel Hill's Joe Hakan and Glenn Corley from Hakan/Corley & Associates, Finch-Heery of Atlanta, and New York City's Geiger Berger.

Since the arena's opening, it has been renovated and updated several times. In 2005, the Dean Dome received four 17.8' x 23.6' high-resolution video boards, along with video ribbon boards along the edge of the upper level and along the scorer's table. Advertising was first allowed starting in later 2005 when the university reached an eight deal with Wachovia Bank. The signage would be placed with the large video boards in arena's corners, along with other sports venues that the campus had. Then athletic director Dick Baddour commented that the sponsorship was allowed in order to help finance upgrades and repairs to the Smith Center. Over the next three years all the seats and the hardwood floor were replaced. Since then the lights, sound system, and the ribbon have been further replaced. In addition, the locker rooms and "behind the scenes" area were renovated prior to the 2016–17 season. The university announced in February 2018 the arena would receive four new video boards, replacing ones that were in place since 2005, for a cost of roughly $6 million which also included new ribbon video board along the upper level. Athletic director Bubba Cunningham commented that the four separate video boards were chosen rather than a central, hanging video board, in part, because it would ruin the "open feel" as well as obscure the view of the rafter's banners that display retired and honored jerseys, national championships, and other accomplishments. The new boards were installed in October 2018 and measure 19' x 100'.

The initial capacity for the Dean Smith Center was 21,444, which made it the third largest on-campus arena for the 1985-86 college basketball season. In the 1990s, the seating was expanded to increase capacity to 21,572. Before the start of the Tar Heels' 2000–01 season, a standing room only section for students was added behind the basket the visiting team opposes in the first half. This increased the capacity of the arena to 21,750. The largest crowd to attend a game in the facility was 23,713 when the Smith Center hosted the 1987 U.S. Olympic Festival basketball game. The largest crowd to see a Carolina game in the Dean Dome was on March 6, 2005, when 22,125 fans saw the North Carolina Tar Heels beat the Duke Blue Devils 75-73 following a nine-point comeback in the final three minutes of regulation.

=== Future ===
The arena was considered state-of-the-art in 1986; however, despite frequent renovations and updates, there are many issues with the building regarding its large number of seats, limited storage due to the lack of rock dynamited out in the west end, and its narrow concourse. In November 2015, Cunningham told the media that the school had been looking at renovating the Smith Center to add premium level seating and reducing the overall capacity by potentially 4,000 seats or building a replacement structure. This project would also be privately financed through donations and athletic department revenue, but not with state taxes. If the school were to renovate the Smith Center, it would continue the lifetime season ticket obligations for patrons or the second generation of the patrons that donated to the Smith Center's initial funding. A potential replacement arena would have to be built on a new site and would require a lot more money; however, it would allow for luxury seating to increase revenue and would eliminate the lifetime seating rights. Should those holding the lifetime season tickets wish to keep their rights, they would then be required to make a significant donation, rather than a minimal donation as they do currently to maintain the tickets. A new arena would greatly increase revenue through yearly seat licensing, and therefore help all athletic programs through the increase in revenue that would then increase the total athletic budget.

The 250-acre Carolina North campus approved in 2009 was being considered in 2024 as a possible site for a replacement arena. In 2025, the planned arena was expected to have 16,000 seats and one plan called for a 25,000-seat UNC Colosseum for cricket. If the university chose renovation of the existing Dean Dome, the roof alone would cost an estimated $80 to $100 million.

== Basketball atmosphere ==
This is not like the Duke crowd. I'd put it like a cheese and wine crowd, laid back

— Sam Cassell following a Florida State victory in the Smith Center on December 15, 1991

The crowd energy in the Smith Center has been criticized periodically since its opening. As early as 1987, a writer for The Daily Tar Heel stated the Smith Center and the university's on-campus football stadium, Kenan Memorial Stadium "usually [resembled] tombs more than athletic arenas." A year later, another Daily Tar Heel writer attended a high school basketball game in the Smith Center and noted that with only 80% of the lower level filled, the fans in attendance made more noise than the Carolina fans made in their home game against NC State that season. Following a victory by Florida State, Seminole Sam Cassell was quoted as calling the fans in attendance "like a cheese and wine crowd." Years following the game, Cassell elaborated on his comments stating that the older alumni–who primarily sat close to the court–weren't loud and stated that the students then sitting in the upper levels were making noise, but their effect was limited as they were higher up. Since Cassell made the comments, the words have commonly been incorrectly remembered and people tend to refer to the Smith Center crowd as a "wine and cheese" crowd. In contrast, Carmichael Auditorium was known for its noise level; before one game, the Virginia Cavaliers couldn't hear their names announced during player introductions because of the din.

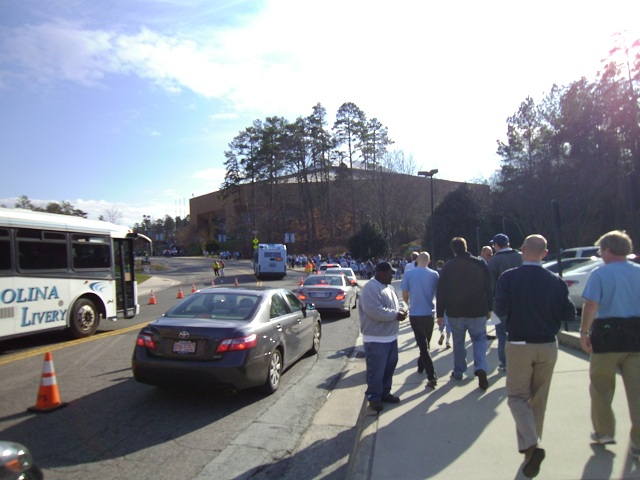
Carolina fans walking to the Smith Center along Skipper Bowles Drive in January 2012.

Typically the issue with crowd noise and involvement stems from the seating above mentioned seating arrangement issues where the lower-level seats are predominately taken up by alumni that donated to help build the arena. The student sections in the lower level often vary depending on the year, but are mainly located in the upper level, far from the court. Following the introduction of the student risers behind one basket in 2000, the crowd was louder, but due to the lack of students behind the other basket, the effect is limiting. In 2004, after the then top-ranked Connecticut Huskies were defeated by Carolina at the Dean Dome, then Huskies coach Jim Calhoun said, "I hear about the wine and cheese crowd and I don't know where the hell they are but they were not here today." After the Tar Heels defeated then top-ranked Ohio State in 2006, Buckeyes coach Thad Matta stated, "I think I've never been in a building that was as loud as that building was at times." However, the crowd still is known to be quiet and following a road loss to the Indiana Hoosiers in 2016, then coach Williams stated "Gosh. I'd like to play in front of a crowd like that in the Smith Center every night other than the frickin' Duke game."

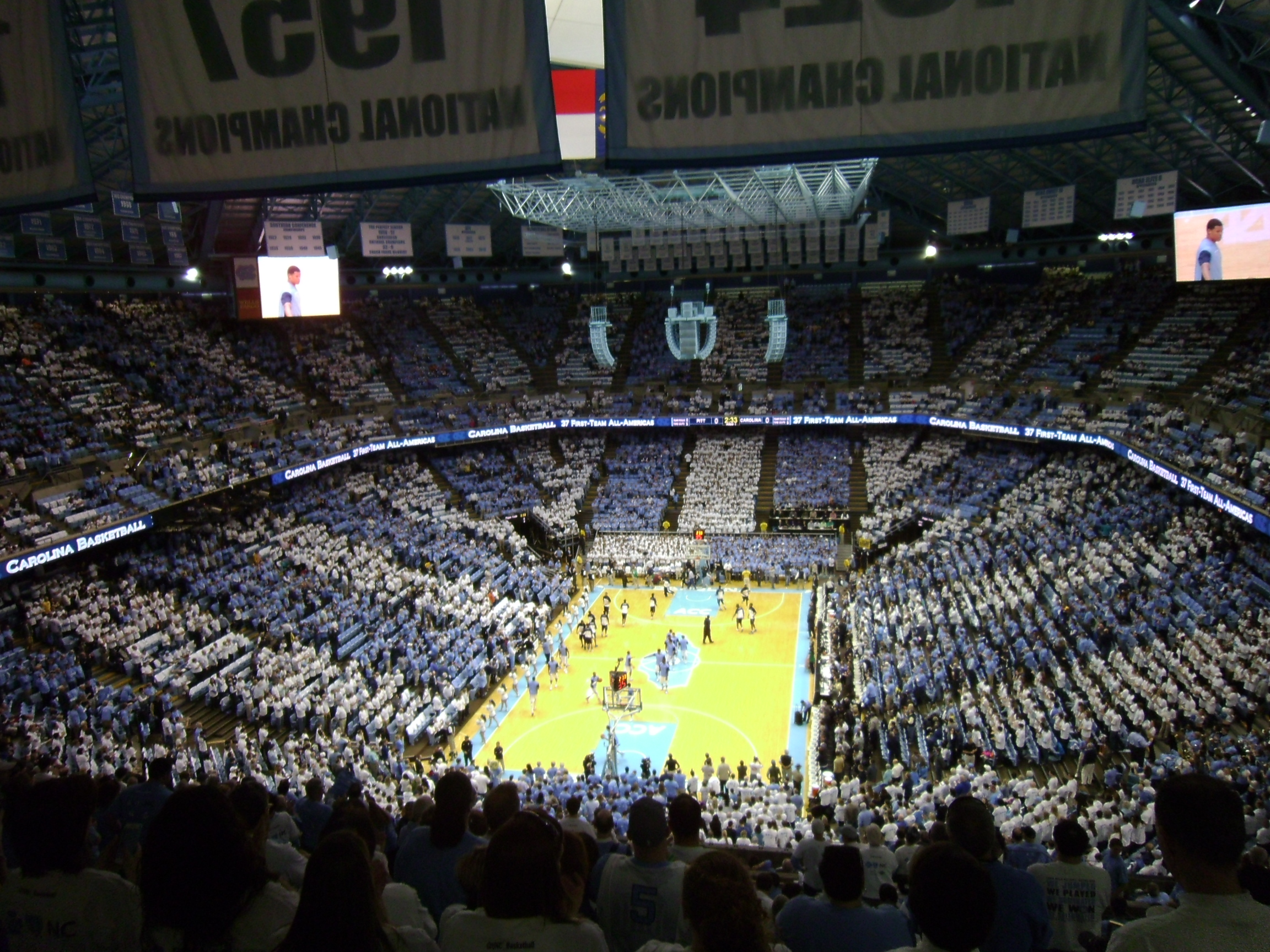
The Smith Center shown on February 15, 2014, when the Tar Heels hosted the Pittsburgh Panthers in the Smith Center's first "Stripe Out". The Tar Heels won the game 75–71.

=== Home–court advantage ===
The Dean Dome has become known for the home–court advantage the Tar Heels possess. Through the 2024–25 season's completion, Carolina teams had played 40 seasons in the arena. Across those seasons, the Tar Heels have played 579 games where they amassed 489 wins against 90 losses, for a win percentage of 84.5%. In five of the 40 seasons, the team has gone undefeated in all contests at the Smith Center: 1986–87 (13–0), 1992–93 (12–0), 2004–05 (15–0), 2010–11 (15–0), and 2016–17 (15–0). In addition, the team has only lost more than three games in a single season at the Smith Center six times. North Carolina's only season with a losing record at home in the Smith Center was 2001–02 when the Tar Heels went 6–9. The Tar Heels showed success in the Atlantic Coast Conference, winning the ACC regular season title in 1987, 1988, 1993, 1995, 2001, 2005, 2007, 2008, 2009, 2011, 2012, 2016, 2017, 2019, and 2024, while winning the post–season conference tournament in 1989, 1991, 1994, 1997, 1998, 2007, 2008, and 2016.

== Other uses ==
The first concert to be hosted in the Smith Center was Kenny Rogers on April 12, 1986. Performance Magazine named the Dean E. Smith Center as the "Venue-of-the-year" in 1987. In addition, Pollstar Readers named it the "Best New Major Concert Venue." The Smith Center hosted many concerts between its opening and 1995, hosting the likes of Pink Floyd, Garth Brooks, Bon Jovi, Guns N' Roses, INXS, R.E.M., Bruce Springsteen, Grateful Dead, Rush, and more. Concerts dwindled following 1995, after which they were mainly Sesame Street Live. One of the reasons the Smith Center stopped hosting concerts was due to the inability to keep up with the musician's production demands like Metallica wanted to perform in the Dean Dome but due to fears of their hydraulic lift ruining the floor. The Smith Center's last concert was in 2008, when Boyz II Men performed.

The facility is used each year for various local high schools' graduations, as well as the December commencement and various May Commencement exercises. Throughout the year blood drives and career fairs are held in the building. The 1988 NCAA Division I men's basketball tournament used the Smith Center as the host for the East region's opening two rounds. The Smith Center and adjacent Koury Natatorium served as the host for various 1999 Special Olympics World Summer Games events. On October 16, 2000, the Toronto Raptors and Philadelphia 76ers played an NBA preseason game at the arena. This featured a number of North Carolina products returning to Chapel Hill: the Raptors' Vince Carter and the 76ers' George Lynch in addition to 76ers coaches Larry Brown and John Kuester. On April 28, 2008, senator and Democratic presidential candidate hopeful Barack Obama held a rally in the arena before the North Carolina primary on May 6. Obama spoke in front of 18,000 wearing a Carolina blue tie while encouraging those to vote early and addressed topics like affordable college and the war in Darfur.

== See also ==
- List of NCAA Division I basketball arenas
- List of indoor arenas by capacity
