= Bob Harris (sportscaster) =

American sports announcer (1942–2024)

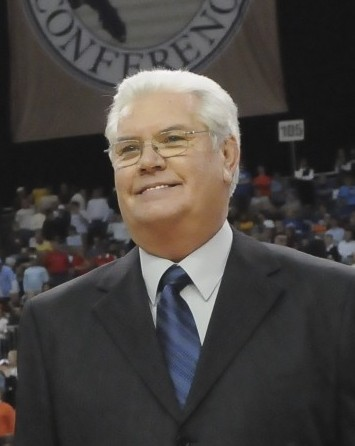
- Harris receives the Skeeter Francis award at the ACC Tournament in Atlanta, 2009
- Born: August 22, 1942; Albemarle, North Carolina, U.S.
- Died: June 12, 2024 (aged 81); Durham, North Carolina, U.S.
- Occupation: Sportscaster
- Years active: 1967–2017
- Awards: North Carolina Sports Hall of Fame (2006); Order of the Long Leaf Pine (2016)

Bob Harris (August 22, 1942 – June 12, 2024), known as the Voice of the Blue Devils, was an American sportscaster, best known as the play-by-play announcer for Duke University men's basketball and football teams. In his 40 seasons at Duke, Harris broadcast 456 consecutive Duke football games (2015) and 1,358 Duke basketball games (2016). His 1,980 game career includes 41 ACC men's basketball tournament games, 126 NCAA men's basketball tournament games in 35 trips, 13 Final Four appearances, 11 national championship games and 5 NCAA Champion titles.

Harris was inducted into the Stanly County Sports Hall of Fame in 1993. He was inducted into the North Carolina Sports Hall of Fame in 2006. Harris was named the 2011 North Carolina Sportscaster of the Year by the National Sportscasters and Sportswriters Association, winning for the third time, following wins in 1988 and 1991. Harris said, "I'm a fan. A fan with a microphone." On June 25, 2016, Harris received the prestigious "Order of the Long Leaf Pine" award from NC Governor Pat McCrory for 40 years of service to the state.

== Early life and career ==
Born on August 22, 1942, Harris grew up in Albemarle, North Carolina. Beginning in 1960, Harris attended North Carolina State University for two years before leaving college to work for Goodyear. He later returned to his hometown for a job selling insurance, where he began working part-time for WZKY, in 1967. Harris volunteered to provide coverage of local football for the station, which led to him being hired as a full-time sports announcer, as well as sports director for eight years.

== Broadcasting career ==
In 1975, Harris and his family relocated to Durham where Harris had been offered a sales job on WDNC. A week later, he was hosting a sports talk show. Eventually, he served as color commentator to then-Duke sportcaster, Add Penfield, broadcasting Duke football and basketball games. When Penfield experienced health problems, Harris filled in. Penfield retired in the spring of 1976, opening the door for Harris to become the "Voice of the Blue Devils" beginning with the 1976 football season.

Nationally, Harris was best known for his play-by-play of Christian Laettner's buzzer beater in Duke's victory over the University of Kentucky in the 1992 East Regional of the NCAA basketball tournament. ESPN considers the 1992 East Regional Final in Philadelphia the "greatest college basketball game ever" played. Harris' description of "The Shot" from the radio broadcast is most often featured with the archival video footage, replacing that of the original television commentators:

They throw it the length of the floor... Laettner catches, comes down, dribbles.. Shoots. Scores! ... Christian Laettner has hit the bucket at the buzzer! The Blue Devils win it 104 to 103. Look out Minneapolis! Here come the Blue Devils!

In December 2010, Harris published his autobiography, "How Sweet It Is!: From the Cotton Mill to the Crows' Nest", recounting his storied career as the "Voice of the Blue Devils". He was courtside to witness all five of Duke's National Championship wins. Included with the book is an 80-minute CD that features some of Harris' interviews, including Muhammad Ali and Red Skelton, along with famous radio calls like "The Shot".

The book, which Harris spent five years writing, was scheduled for a March 2010 release, but delayed until December. "It was all set to be released, but then Duke won another national championship." Harris said, "So I had to add another chapter for obvious reasons."

Harris was active in book signings, often for the benefit of charities. He participated in a "red carpet book signing event" for Pantry, Inc. as part of their "Battle for Bean Street" competition, with the prize being a $20,000 corporate donation to the Duke Cancer Institute. Recently, Harris partnered with Kangeroo Express to host "Salute Our Troops", a fundraiser that raised $2.5 million in support of military service men and women. Reflecting on the retirement of a fellow broadcaster, Harris had this to say: "As long as my health is good and as long as my passion is still there for the games, the broadcasts and the kids, and as long as I'm still doing the job that Duke needs and wants me to do, I really don't want to retire anytime soon because I have fun doing it". Says, Harris, "I don't want to rust away. I want to wear out."

On October 15, 2011, Harris celebrated his 400th consecutive Duke Football radio broadcast. "It just means that the good Lord has given me good health for 36 plus years and enabled me to be there," says Harris. "It was not something that I had as a goal. I'm so happy that I've got a job like mine and I get to do something that I love." During his football career, Harris worked with nine coaches, called plays for All-Americas and future NFL players. After 456 games, Harris maintains there is still an element of excitement to this work. "A Saturday afternoon in Wallace Wade Stadium in late October is just as exciting to me as a Wednesday night in February in Cameron Indoor Stadium," says Harris.

On February 9, 2012, Harris' call of a game between the University of North Carolina Tarheels and the Duke Blue Devils was said to rival his call of Laettner's "shot":

"Nine seconds left and Rivers comes front court… Rivers works to the right side, he'll try to step back with one second left…lets fly…got it! The Blue Devils win it over North Carolina! 85-84! Oh my gosh! I do not believe this!"

Harris called his 1,200th Duke Men's Basketball game on February 16, 2012, an exciting game with the team overcoming a twenty-point deficit to defeat Harris' alma mater, North Carolina State, 78-73.

Harris advised young broadcasters: "Don't try to be the next somebody. Be the best "your name" that you can be. Listen to all these other broadcasters, listen to the veterans to see how they do things, what they say, how they describe things...I think sometimes the younger people get a little bit antsy. They wanna have it happen now, and it's not going to. You've got to pay your dues."

Lewis Bowling, author and teacher at N.C. Central University and Duke University, declares that Harris is "a favorite among fans, and Duke athletes through the years have looked to this affable man as a father figure and friend. With Bob Harris' voice in Duke fans' ears, many of us can say to him, "How sweet it is!".

Harris retired in 2017, and was diagnosed with Alzheimer's disease in his later years. He died in Durham on June 12, 2024.
