= WIZS =

- Henderson, North Carolina; United States
- Frequency: 1450 kHz

Programming
- Format: Full-service radio (Country, beach, oldies, talk and sports)

Ownership
- Owner: Rose Farm and Rentals, Inc.

History
- First air date: May 23, 1955

Technical information
- Licensing authority: FCC
- Facility ID: 57674
- Class: C
- Power: 1,000 watts
- Transmitter coordinates: 36°20′14″N 78°25′11″W
- Translator: 100.1 W261DK (Henderson)

Links
- Public license information: Public file; LMS
- Webcast: Listen live
- Website: wizs.com

WIZS (1450 AM) is a radio station licensed to Henderson, North Carolina, United States. The station is currently owned by Rose Farm And Rentals, Inc.
