= WZKY =

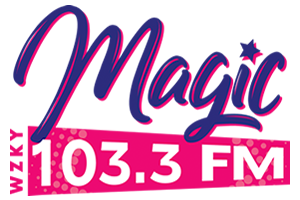
- Albemarle, North Carolina; United States
- Broadcast area: Stanly County, North Carolina
- Frequency: 1580 kHz C-QUAM AM Stereo
- Branding: Magic 103.3 FM

Programming
- Format: Oldies
- Affiliations: Fox News Radio

Ownership
- Owner: Stanly Communications
- Sister stations: WSPC

History
- First air date: July 9, 1956

Technical information
- Licensing authority: FCC
- Facility ID: 49044
- Class: D
- Power: 1,000 watts day 12 watts night
- Transmitter coordinates: 35°21′38.51″N 80°10′38.21″W
- Translator: See § Translators

Links
- Public license information: Public file; LMS
- Webcast: Listen Live
- Website: WZKY Online

WZKY (1580 AM, "Magic 103.3 FM") is a radio station licensed to serve Albemarle, North Carolina, United States. The station is owned by Stanly Communications and broadcasts an oldies music format that at one time included programming from the Classic Hits network by ABC Radio.

WZKY is where Bob Harris, "Voice of the Blue Devils", got his start in the radio business.

== History ==
On September 4, 1955, Stanly County Broadcasting Company applied to the Federal Communications Commission for a construction permit for a new 250-watt daytime-only AM station on 1580 kHz. The FCC granted the permit on February 29, 1956, by which time the station had been assigned the WZKY call sign. The station's first license was granted on September 6, 1956.

Steve Blalock, asked why the letters WZKY were chosen, said WCKY was also near the top of the dial and people could listen to that station at night.

In 1960 Suburban Radio Group, which owned nearby WEGO, bought WZKY. The company owned WZKY for 20 years.

In 1967, Bob Harris, now voice of the Duke Blue Devils, offered to take over the job of announcing West Stanly High School football games for WZKY, though his only experience had been as a student announcer for Albemarle High School (North Carolina) Albemarle High School basketball. WZKY station manager Ralph Gardner gave Harris a reel-to-reel tape recorder because the 250-watt station could only broadcast during the daylight hours, and the game would not air until 11 A.M. on Saturday.

Harris became morning host and sports director, and added more games, including boys' and girls' basketball, until, a 2009 Salisbury Post article said, "By 1975, WZKY was originating more sports programming than any other station in the state." Harris remained sports director at WZKY for eight years before moving to WDNC.

Susi and Bill Norman, who met at Pfeiffer College, wanted to buy a radio station. Bill Norman had managed WNMB in North Myrtle Beach, South Carolina. Norman Communications' purchase of WZKY became official in February 1980.

Under the Normans, WZKY increased its power from 250 to 1,000 watts and became one of the first stations to use AM stereo in February 1986. The station also aired Pfeiffer basketball. Programming was mostly oldies music but WZKY added Rush Limbaugh in 1992 and later other talk shows. With automation, WZKY went to 24-hour broadcasts in January 1993.

In April 1993, the Normans bought WXLX, which had gone off the air in November 1990. This was one of the first purchases of a second AM in the same community by the same owner. At first, WXLX simulcast WZKY.

== Translator ==
WZKY programming is simulcast on the following translator:

Call sign	Frequency	City of license	FID	ERP (W)	HAAT	Class	Transmitter coordinates	FCC info
W277DK	103.3 FM	Albemarle, North Carolina	200901	250	67 m (220 ft)	D	35°23′13.5″N 80°11′31.2″W	LMS
