= Mick Mixon =

American football broadcaster

Forest Orion "Mick" Mixon III is the former play-by-play radio voice announcer for the Carolina Panthers of the National Football League. Mixon took this position during the 2005 football season, replacing Bill Rosinski. Previously, he was the color analyst for the Tar Heel Sports Network, working alongside former "Voice of the Tar Heels," play-by-play announcer Woody Durham, beginning in 1989. He lost his parents in the crash of United Airlines Flight 232 that same year.

Mixon graduated from the University of North Carolina at Chapel Hill in 1980 with a bachelor's degree in broadcast journalism. He was an adjunct lecturer in the UNC School of Journalism and Mass Communications.

Mixon was the play-by-play voice of the Maine Guides as well as the sports director of WCGC. Prior to joining the Tar Heel Sports Network, Mick was the sports director of WIS Radio.

While with the Tar Heel Sports Network, Mixon produced Inside Carolina Football with Mack Brown. He wrote a column for TarHeelBlue.com (now GoHeels.com). He also was the play-by-play voice for North Carolina Tar Heels baseball.

Mixon was named vice president of the Tar Heel Sports Network in 1996.

In 1999, Mick was named North Carolina Sportscaster of the Year.

In his spare time, Mixon plays drums for a cover band, the Franklin Street Band, and another band, Mick & the Ultras.

On June 3, 2021, Mixon announced that he will retire after the 2021 season.
