= WNGM (AM) =

Mountain City, Georgia; United States
- Frequency: 1340 kHz

Programming
- Format: Defunct (formerly Talk/Adult Standards)

Ownership
- Owner: Mountain City Broadcasting, Inc.

History
- Former call signs: WALH (1985–2013); WELG (2013); WHTD (2013–2014)

Technical information
- Facility ID: 69703
- Class: C
- Power: 1,000 watts day 1,000 watts night
- Transmitter coordinates: 34°56′16.00″N 83°23′27.00″W

WNGM (1340 AM) was a talk/adult standards radio station licensed to Mountain City, Georgia, United States. The station filed to be silent temporarily in April 2009.

The station's owners surrendered its license to the FCC on April 23, 2014.
