= Glück =

Glück is a surname. Notable people with the surname include:

- Arie Gill-Gluck (1930–2016), Israeli Olympic runner
- Alois Glück (1940-2024), German politician
- Bernard Glueck (disambiguation), several people with this name
- Christian Friedrich von Glück (1755–1831), German jurist
- Eleanor Glueck (1898–1972), American criminologist and wife of Sheldon Glueck
- George Glueck (born 1950), German music producer and artist manager
- Grace Glueck (1926–2022), American art journalist
- Gustav Glück (1871–1952), Austrian art historian
- Helen Iglauer Glueck (1907–1995), American physician
- Johann Ernst Glück (1652–1705), German translator and Lutheran theologian
- Larry Glueck (1941–2025), American football (NFL) defensive back
- Louise Glück (1943–2023), American poet
- Nelson Glueck (1900–1971), American rabbi, academic and archaeologist
- Richard Glück (born 1992), Slovak politician
- Sheldon Glueck (1896–1980), Polish American criminologist
- Wolfgang Glück (1929–2023), Austrian film director and screenwriter

Gluck is a surname. Notable people with the surname include:

- Alma Gluck (Reba Feinsohn) (1884–1938), a Romanian-American soprano
- Barbara Gluck (born 1938), American photographer
- Carol Gluck (born 1941), American historian of modern Japan
- Christoph Willibald Gluck (1714–1787), one of the most important opera composers of the Classical music era
- Earle J. Gluck (1900–1972), American radio pioneer
- Edgar Gluck (born 1936), rabbi in Galicia
- Frederick Gluck (born 1935), American management consultant
- Henry Gluck (born 1929), American business executive and philanthropist from Los Angeles, California.
- Herschel Gluck, British rabbi
- Jay Gluck (1927–2000), American archaeologist and art historian
- Louis Gluck (1924–1997), American neonatologist
- Malcolm Gluck, British wine writer
- Mark A. Gluck, American professor of neuroscience
- Maxwell Henry Gluck (1899–1984), American businessman, diplomat, thoroughbred horse breeder and philanthropist
- Michael Gluck (born 1983), American pianist
- Peter L. Gluck, American architect
- Rita Buglass Gluck, American writer
- Robert Gluck (born 1955), American pianist and composer
- Salomon Gluck (1914–1944), French physician and member of the French Resistance
- Themistocles Gluck (1853–1942), German physician
- Will Gluck, American film director, screenwriter, and producer

== See also ==
- Richard Glücks (1889–1945), a German Nazi official and Holocaust perpetrator
- Andrej Glucks (born 1976), Croatian slalom canoer
- Glack, Glock
- Gluek (disambiguation)
- Glick
