= Gluck (surname) =

Gluck is a surname of German or Yiddish origin. The root word means luck in either language. It is a last name found among Ashkenazi Jews and those of German ancestry. However, there is evidence that the composer Christoph Willibald Gluck's surname derives from the Czech word kluk (boy).

Notable people with the surname include:

- Abbe Gluck, American legal academic
- Alma Gluck (Reba Feinsohn) (1884–1938), Romanian-American soprano
- Arie Gluck (1930–2016), Israeli runner and coach
- Barbara Gluck (born 1938), American photographer
- Benjamin Gluck (born 1979), American screenwriter, animator and director
- Carol Gluck (born 1941), American historian of modern Japan
- Christoph Willibald Gluck (1714–1787), one of the most important opera composers of the Classical music era
- Earle J. Gluck (1900–1972), American radio pioneer
- Edgar Gluck (born 1936), rabbi in Galicia
- Frederick Gluck (born 1935), American management consultant
- Gemma La Guardia Gluck (1881–1962), American writer and Holocaust survivor
- Griffin Gluck (born 2000), American actor
- Hazel Gluck (born 1934), American politician and lobbyist
- Heidi Gluck, Canadian-American musician and singer-songwriter
- Henry Gluck (born 1929), American business executive and philanthropist
- Herschel Gluck (born 1959), British rabbi
- Jay Gluck (1927–2000), American archaeologist and art historian
- Jeff Gluck, American motorsports journalist
- John Duval Gluck (1878–1951), American philanthropist and con artist
- Laurence Gluck (1953–2024), American real estate businessman
- Louis Gluck (1924–1997), American neonatologist
- Malcolm Gluck, British wine writer
- Mark A. Gluck, American professor of neuroscience
- Maxwell Henry Gluck (1899–1984), American businessman, diplomat, thoroughbred horse breeder and philanthropist
- Michael Gluck (born 1983), American pianist
- Pearl Gluck, American filmmaker and professor
- Peter L. Gluck (born 1939), American architect
- Rita Buglass Gluck, American writer
- Robert Gluck (born 1955), American pianist and composer
- Salomon Gluck (1914–1944), French physician and member of the French Resistance
- Themistocles Gluck (1853–1942), German physician
- Viktor Gluck (1897–1957), German cinematographer
- Will Gluck (born 1978), American film director, screenwriter, and producer

== See also ==
- Richard Glücks (1889–1945), German Nazi official and Holocaust perpetrator
- Andrej Glucks (born 1976), Croatian slalom canoer
- Glack, Glock
- Gluek (disambiguation)
- Glück (surname)
- Glick
