= Glück (surname) =

Glück (transliterated Glueck) (German: "luck") is the surname of:

- Alois Glück (born 1940), German politician
- Andreas Glück (born 1975), German surgeon and politician
- Bernard Glueck (disambiguation), several people with this name
- Bob Glück (born 1947), American writer, poet, and artist
- Christian Friedrich von Glück (1755–1831), German jurist
- Eleanor Glueck (1898–1972), American criminologist and wife of Sheldon Glueck
- Ernst Gottlieb Glück (c. 1698–1767), Russian statesman
- Ferdinando Glück (1901–1987), Italian cross-country skier
- George Glueck (born 1950), German music producer and artist manager
- Gere Glück, German canoeist
- Grace Glueck (1926–2022), American arts journalist
- Gustav Glück (1871–1952), Austrian art historian
- Helen Iglauer Glueck (1907–1995), American physician
- Helmut Glück (born 1949), German linguist
- Hermann Glück (1903–1979), Austrian weightlifter
- Johann Ernst Glück (1652–1705), German translator and Lutheran theologian
- Larry Glueck (born 1941), American football player
- Louise Glück (1943-2023), American poet
- Markus Glueck (born 1990), Austrian bobsledder
- Michael Glück (born 2003), Austrian footballer
- Nelson Glueck (1900–1971), American rabbi, academic and archaeologist
- Sheldon Glueck (1896–1980), Polish American criminologist
- Wolfgang Glück (1929–2023), Austrian film director and screenwriter

== See also ==
- Glack
- Glick
- Richard Glücks (1889–1945), a German Nazi official and Holocaust perpetrator
- Andrej Glucks (born 1976), Croatian slalom canoer
- Glock
- Gluek (disambiguation)
- Gluck (surname)
