= Peter Glick =

Peter Glick may refer to:

- Peter Glick (American football) (1922–1986)
- Peter Glick (psychologist)
