= Bernard Glueck =

Bernard Glueck may refer to:

- Bernard Glueck Sr. (1884–1972), Polish-American forensic psychiatrist and psychoanalyst; opened first prison psychiatric clinic, testified at the Leopold and Loeb trial, president of American Psychopathological Association
- Bernard Glueck Jr. (1914–1999), American psychiatrist, published on transcendental meditation and preventive psychiatry

== See also ==
- Bernard Gluck, character played by Victor Buono on The Tony Randall Show
- Glueck (disambiguation)
