= Gluck (disambiguation) =

Christoph Willibald Gluck (1714–1787) was a composer of Italian and French opera.

Gluck may also refer to:

- Gluck (surname)
- 7624 Gluck, a main-belt asteroid
- Gluck (card game)
- Gluck (crater), a crater on Mercury
- Gluck (painter) (1895–1978), British painter (birth name Hannah Gluckstein)

== See also ==
Glück (surname).
