= Gleick =

Gleick is a surname. Notable people with the surname include:

- James Gleick (born 1954), American author, journalist, and biographer
- Peter Gleick (born 1956), American scientist

== See also ==
- Glick
