= Gallick =

Gallick is a surname. Notable people with the surname include:

- Nate Gallick (born 1983), American wrestler
- Nick Gallick (born 1986), American wrestler
- Sherri Gallick (fl. 2023), American politician from Missouri
- Chris Gallick (born 1979), American Teacher

== See also ==
- Glick
