= Ernst Gottlieb Glück =

Russian statesman (c. 1698 – 1767)

- Born: c. 1698; Marienburg, Livonia, Kingdom of Sweden
- Died: 14 November 1767 (aged 68–69); Saint-Petersburg, Russian Empire
- Occupation: Jurist
- Partner: Charlotte Julia von Taube von ter Issen
- Children: Karl Friedrich Gluck, Eleanor Glitch
- Parents: Johann Ernst Glück (father); Christiana Emerence von Router (mother)

Ernst Gottlieb Glück (Russian: Эрнст Готлиб Глюк; about 1698 – 14 November [N.S. 25 November] 1767) was a Russian statesman of German descent.

== Biography ==
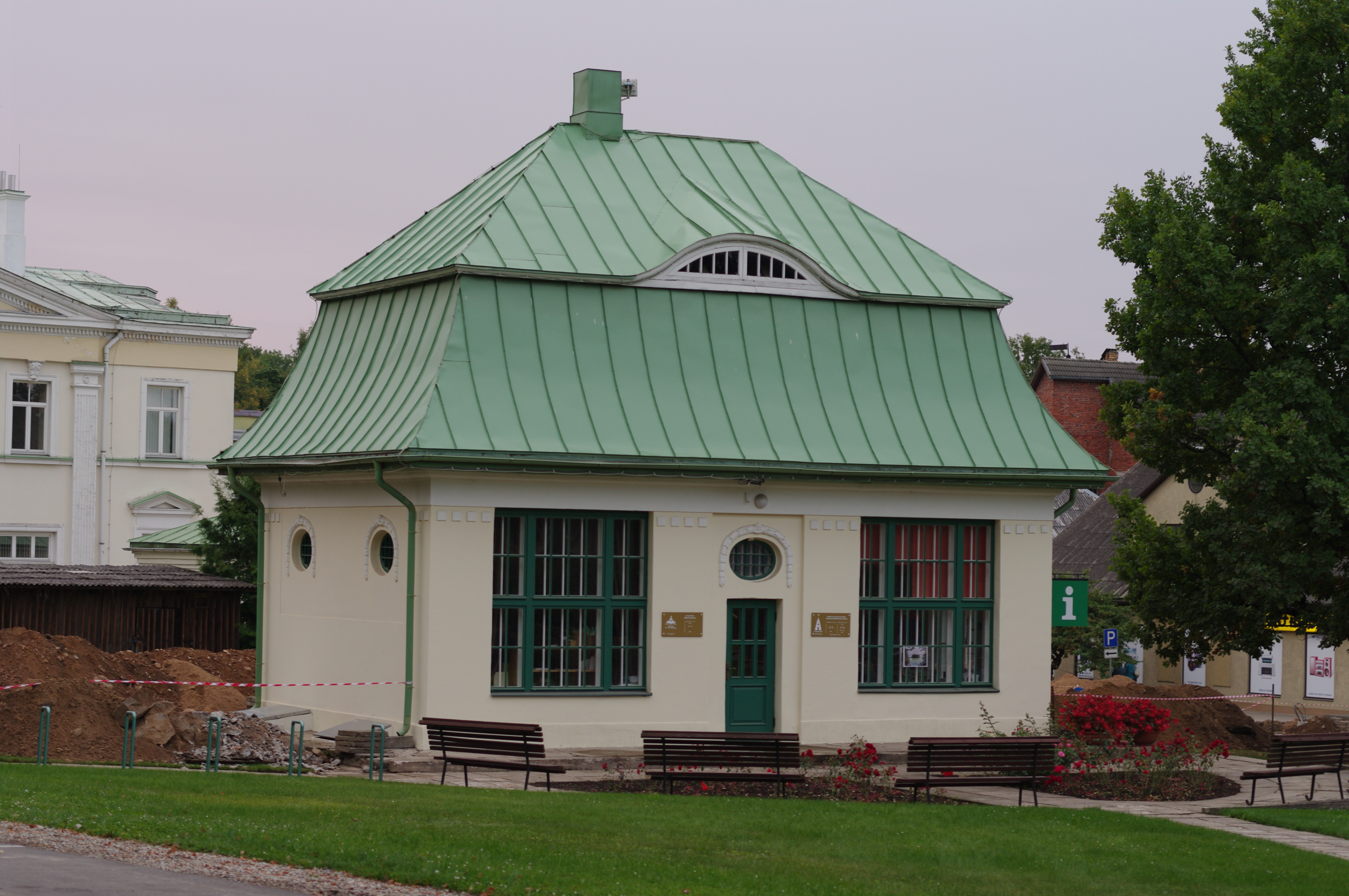
The house of Pastor Johann Ernst Glück in Marienburg (the birthplace of Ernst Gottlieb Glück) is now a national museum.

He was born in Marienburg (present-day Alūksne, Latvia). His father, Johann Ernst Glück (1652–1705), was a German Lutheran theologian, pastor, teacher and also known for translating the Bible into the Latvian and Russian languages; his mother, Christian Emerentia von Reutern (died 1740), belonged to the Livonian nobility. As a child, he received his education at home. From 1716, he lived in Prussia and studied law at the University of Königsberg.

In 1725, by order of Empress Catherine I of Russia, he was employed as an assessor in the Justice Collegium for Livonian and Estonian Affairs, which was renamed several times during his career: from 23 November 1739 – the Livonian and Estonian Affairs Collegium; from 8 February 1742 – the Justice Collegium of the Livonian and Estonian Affairs; from 15 December 1763 – the Justice Collegium of the Livonian, Estonian and Finnish Affairs.

The Justice Collegium of Livonian and Estonian Affairs was in charge of all judicial institutions of the provinces attached in the Great Northern War of 1700–1721, but the highest court of appeal was the Senate (since 1762 the institutions of Vyborg Governorate belonged to the Justice Collegium of Livonian and Estonian Affairs). The Collegium of Livonian and Estonian Affairs did not have a founding document, which is why its range of duties was not exactly defined. The Justice Collegium of Livonian and Estonian Affairs was in charge of administrative affairs (the appointment of officials, the correspondence with imperial institutions): the court (processing of complaints on the wrong actions of the local administration and appeals against class courts' decisions and sentences); taxes (in 1739–1742); church problems of the Baltic population and the population of Vyborg Governorate, the Protestant Church in the Russian Empire (marriage, divorce, pastors` appointment and dismissal, disputes between the parishioners and the clergy, the maintenance of church service, establishing holidays). The peculiarity of the Collegium of the Livonian and Estonian Affairs was its activity guided by the local (mostly Swedish) legislation of the 15th century to the beginning of the 18th century, and the church (canon) law but not the Russian (imperial) legal system. The official language of the Collegium of Livonian and Estonian Affairs was German. Ernst Gottlieb Glück, like many officials of this Collegium, belonged to the Evangelical Lutheran Church.

In 1740, Ernst Gottlieb Glück was appointed the first councillor to the Justice Collegium of Livonian and Estonian Affairs. In September 1741, he submitted an application to grant him and his descendants a diploma to the nobility and a coat of arms. He was given a coat of arms: "A gold winged ball; there was the Happiness or the Fortune on it". The coat of arms and the diploma to the nobility had not been approved by Empress Elizabeth for an unknown reason at that time.

From 1754, some Russian researchers have called Ernst Gottlieb Glück the vice-president of the Justice Collegium of Livonian and Estonian Affairs. Baltisches Biographisches Lexikon doubts this fact. D. Raskin also called F. Emme the vice-president of the Justice Collegium of Livonian and Estonian Affairs in 1741–1764 and T. Klingstedt in 1764–1771, but did not mention Ernst Gottlieb Glück. At first, the "Russian genealogy book", an authoritative genealogical reference by Aleksey Lobanov-Rostovsky, called him the vice-president of the Justice Collegium in its text, but it was another collegial authority, then the vice-president of the Livonian and Estonian Affairs Justice Collegium and the actual state councilor in the changes and additions to first volume.

In 1781, the Senate passed a resolution about Ernst Gottlieb Glück's diploma to the nobility and his coat of arms: "15 March 1745 it is ordered to offer a diploma made by Glück for the signing of Her Majesty, when she will be in the Senate. And as the diploma is not used at present time, give it to the Archive”. By that time, Glück had been already dead for 14 years.

== Private life ==
Ernst Gottlieb Glück was married twice. His first wife's name is unknown. He then married Charlotte Julia von Taube von ter Issen (18 April 1742). The children from the second marriage were Carl Friedrich (born 16 February 1754 and probably died that date) and Eleanor (1764 — 27 May 1816, married to Christian Leopold von Vildeman, who was a great-nephew of Field Marshal Burkhard Christoph von Münnich.
