= WBT (AM) =

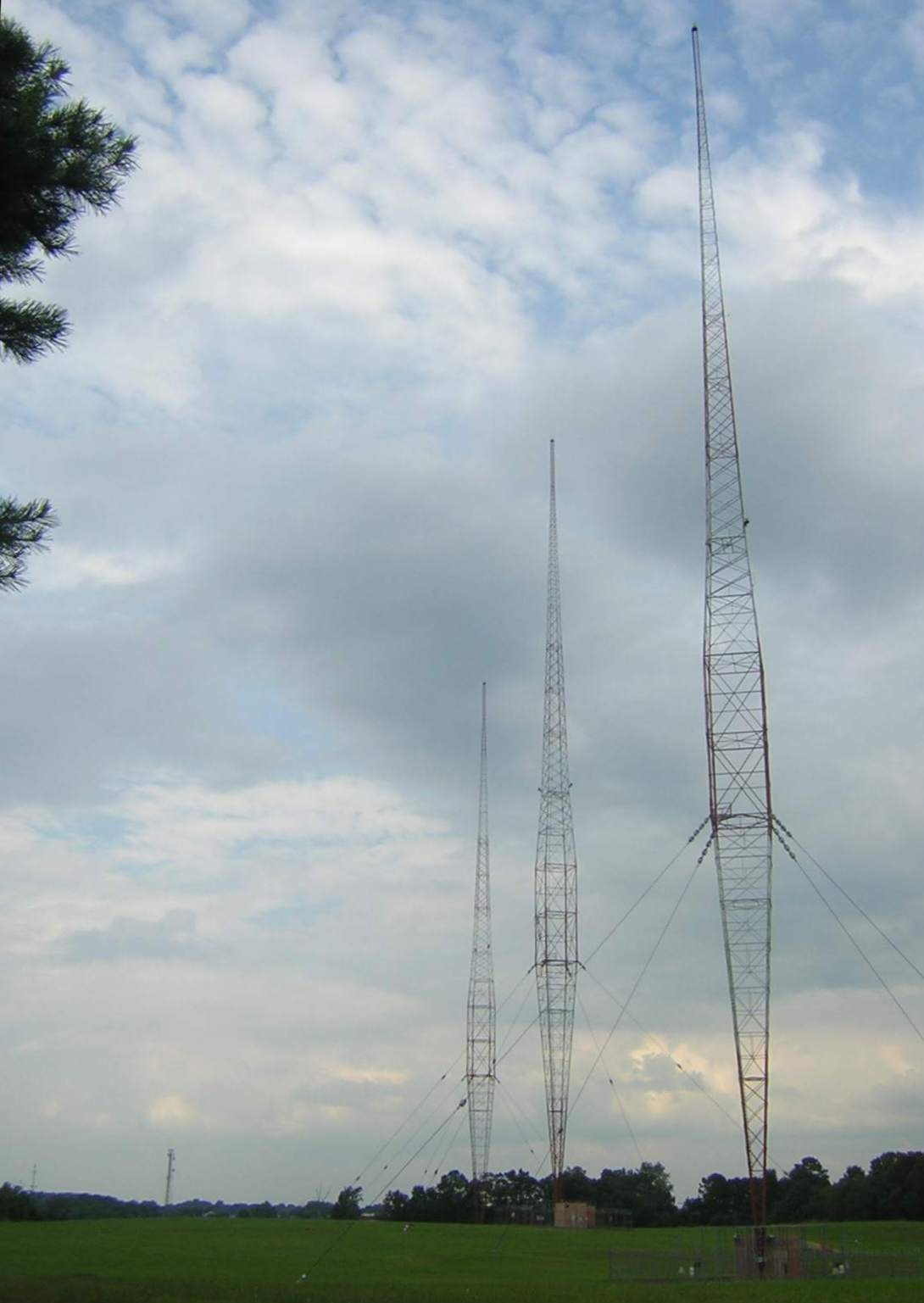
- 2007: WBT transmitter site just south of Uptown Charlotte, North Carolina
- Charlotte, North Carolina; United States
- Broadcast area: Charlotte metropolitan area
- Frequency: 1110 kHz

Programming
- Language: English
- Format: Stunting

Ownership
- Owner: Urban One; (Radio One of North Carolina, LLC)
- Sister stations: WBT-FM; WFNZ-FM; WOSF; WPZS

History
- First air date: March 22, 1922 (also earlier broadcasts as experimental station 4XD)
- Call sign meaning: Randomly assigned

Technical information
- Licensing authority: FCC
- Facility ID: 30830
- Class: A
- Power: 50,000 watts
- Transmitter coordinates: 35°7′56.52″N 80°53′22.26″W

Links
- Public license information: Public file; LMS

WBT (1110 AM) is a commercial radio station licensed to serve Charlotte, North Carolina, United States. The station is owned by Urban One, with studios and offices located off West Morehead Street, just west of Uptown Charlotte, co-located with the city's CBS affiliate, WBTV.

WBT's broadcast towers are three of only eight operational diamond-shaped Blaw-Knox towers in the United States. The station broadcasts 50,000 watts around the clock as the only Class A clear-channel station in the Carolinas. Its transmitter site is located in south Charlotte, off Nations Ford Road. A single non-directional antenna radiates the transmitter's full power during the day. Its daytime coverage is not nearly as large as those of other 50,000-watt stations, due to the Carolinas' poor ground conductivity; some outer suburbs such as Statesville, Shelby, and Salisbury only get a grade B signal. Despite this, it provides at least secondary coverage as far north as the eastern Piedmont Triad, as far west as the eastern portion of the Upstate, as far east as the Pee Dee and as far south as the Columbia suburbs. Under the right conditions, it can be heard well into the more mountainous areas of the Carolinas, as well as the Sandhills. At night, all three towers are used in a directional pattern that limits its signal toward the west, to avoid interfering with KFAB in Omaha, Nebraska, the other Class A station on the frequency. Even with this restriction, it can be heard across much of the eastern half of North America with a good radio. For many years, WBT boasted that at night it could be heard "from Maine to Miami".

Since January 8, 2026, the station has suspended regular programming and run a repeating message saying its former programming has been transferred to WBT-FM at 107.9 FM.

== History ==
=== Formation ===
As with many early radio stations, there is a limited amount of information about WBT's origins. Wesley Wallace's 1962 review of the history of North Carolina radio reported being frustrated "by the absence or inaccessibility" of information, noting that "Broadcasters have been too busy acting in the present tense to take much thought of the past; hence they have discarded much of the memorabilia of broadcasting's earlier days".

WBT was first licensed as a broadcasting station on March 18, 1922. However, the station traces its history to earlier broadcasts made in a joint effort by Fred Laxton, associated with General Electric, Earle J. Gluck, a Westinghouse Electric and Manufacturing Company engineer and Frank Bunker, a Southern Bell Telephone Company employee. During World War I a ban was in place that suspended amateur radio transmissions. In late 1919, the ban was lifted, and all three became licensed radio amateurs. Most amateurs at this time used spark transmitters that could only transmit the dots-and-dashes of Morse code, however, Laxton managed to acquire a scarce vacuum tube from General Electric, which made audio transmissions possible.

The three decided to set up a transmitter in an abandoned chicken coop located behind Laxton's home at 2462 Mecklenburg Avenue, with a microphone line running to the home's living room. Laxton's daughter later remembered being drafted as a child to repeatedly count into the microphone for the early test transmissions. These initial transmissions eventually were expanded into the playing of phonograph records, which resulted in enough interest from local amateurs, as well as technically advanced members of the general public, that a regular schedule of broadcasts was established. In late 1920, the station was issued an Experimental radio station license to Fred Laxton, located at his home address, with the call sign 4XD.

The growing interest in radio led to the December 1921 founding of the Southern Radio Corporation, located in the Realty Building, to sell radio parts and equipment. The initial officers were Fred Laxton, president, J. B. Marshall, vice president, and Frank Bunker, commercial engineer in charge. It was also announced at this time that the company planned to installed a transmitter and rooftop antenna at the Realty building, to be used for "sending out concerts, big speeches and other entertainment to those who own home outfits within a radius of 200 miles [320 km] from Charlotte".

=== Early years ===
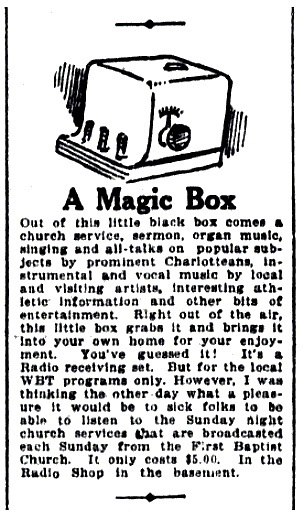
Little-Long Company advertisement for a crystal radio receiver capable of picking up WBT's programs (October 1922)

Initially there were no specific standards in the United States for radio stations making transmissions intended for the general public, and numerous stations under various classifications made entertainment broadcasts. However, effective December 1, 1921, the Department of Commerce, the regulators of radio at this time, adopted a regulation that formally created a broadcasting station category, and stations were now required to hold a Limited Commercial license authorizing operation on wavelengths of 360 meters for "entertainment" broadcasts or 485 meters for "market and weather reports" (833 and 619 kHz).

The Southern Radio Corporation was issued a "provisional" broadcasting station license, with the randomly assigned call letters WBT, on March 18, 1922, which authorized broadcasts on the 360-meter entertainment wavelength. WBT made its first broadcast four days later on March 22. The next day's Charlotte Observer reported that: "Erected by the Southern Radio corporation of this city and attached to the Realty building, this station, officially designated as WBT, operating on a 360-meter wavelength, this station will arrange musical concerts, addresses on various subjects and will give nightly programs for the benefit of approximately 20,000 receiving stations within a hearing radius. The first program was given last night and several stations in this section are known to have picked up the Victrola music broadcasted." This article further described the "wireless telephone broadcasting station" as "the first station that has been erected and put in active operating condition in the Carolinas. A station (WLAC) has been erected at State college in West Raleigh, but it did not work properly and it will probably be a few weeks before it will be in a position to do any broadcasting." On April 11, following a successful inspection by the Fourth Radio District inspector, Walter Van Nostrand Jr on April 4, 1922, the license's "provisional" qualifier was removed.

In October 1925, Fred Laxton sold the Southern Radio Corporation to the Carolina States Electric Company for approximately $50,000, while retaining control of WBT. However, the next month, the station was sold to Charlotte Buick automobile dealer C. C. Coddington, who would promote both the radio station and his auto dealership with the slogan "Watch Buicks Travel". The station was moved to the top of the Coddington building, although Coddington later moved the transmitter site to farm property he owned on Nations Ford Road in south Charlotte, where it remains today.

On November 11, 1928, under the provisions of the Federal Radio Commission's General Order 40, WBT was assigned to a "clear channel" frequency of 1080 kHz, which gave it exclusive national nighttime use of that frequency. In 1929, C.C. Coddington sold WBT to the two-year-old CBS Radio Network. In subsequent years, a series of power increases raised the station's from 5,000 watts to the maximum permitted: 50,000 watts. The 50,000 watt transmitter was dedicated on August 12, 1932.

=== CBS Radio ===
Russ Hodges, later famous as the radio voice of the New York/San Francisco Giants, was WBT's sports editor in the late 1930s, leaving in 1941 for Washington, D.C.

During the Golden Age of Radio, WBT carried the CBS schedule of dramas, comedies, news, sports, soap operas, game shows and big band broadcasts to listeners in the Carolinas and at night, around the Southern United States. One musical program was "Arthur Smith and the Crackerjacks". Smith, best known for writing the song that became the Deliverance theme "Dueling Banjos", went to work at WBT at age 20 at the invitation of station manager Charles Crutchfield. He played guitar and fiddle for musical programs on WBT before getting his own show. Crutchfield believed that Charlotte, not Nashville, could have ended up being the country music capital because of the station's early "Briarhoppers" and "Carolina Hayride" shows, which may have inspired The Grand Ole Opry.

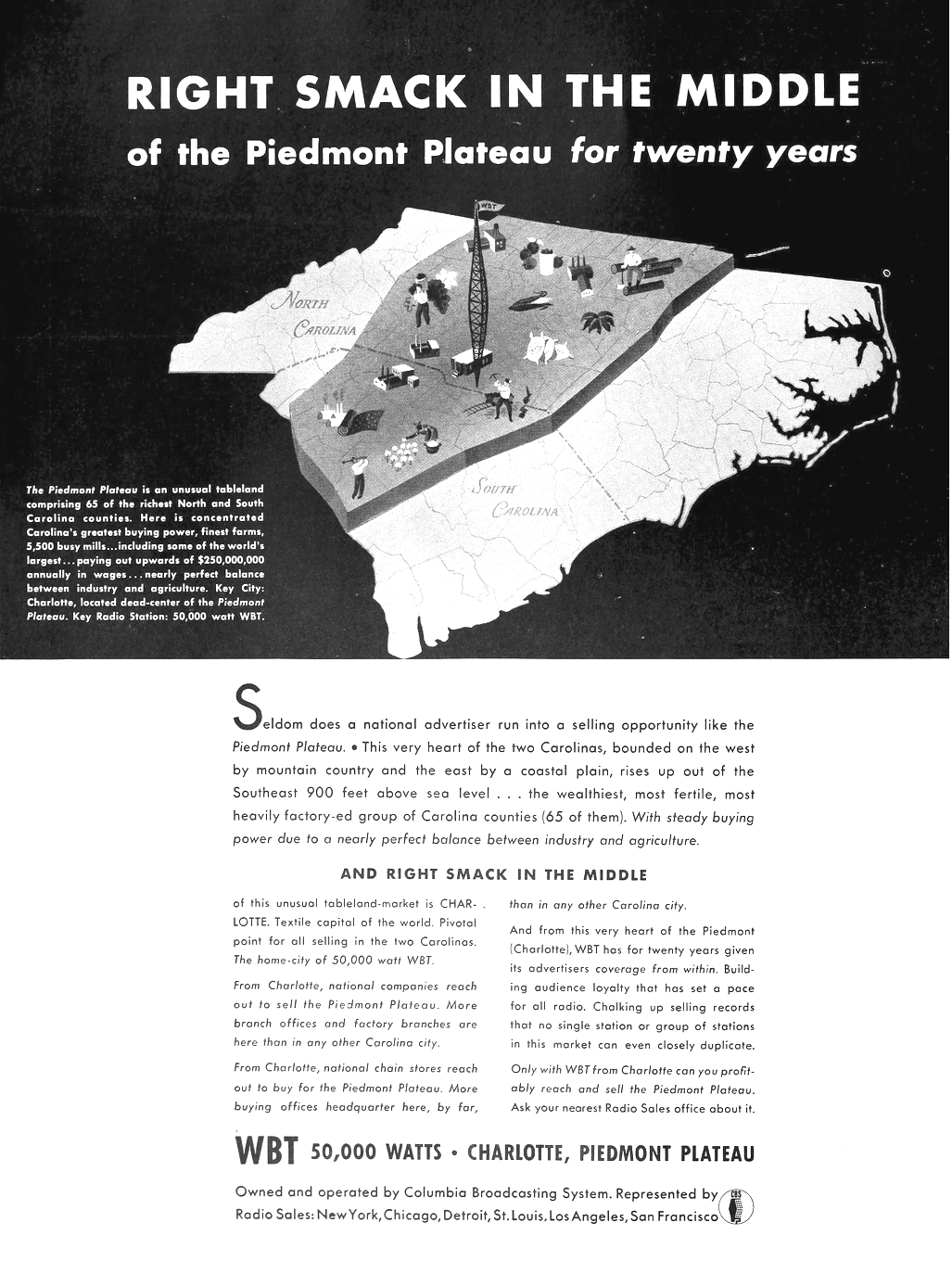
1941 station advertisement, featuring the daytime coverage.

In March 1941, as part of the implementation of the North American Regional Broadcasting Agreement, WBT was shifted to 1110 kHz, where it has been ever since. During the previous November 11, 1928, frequency reassignments, two midwestern stations, WBBM in Chicago and KFAB in Omaha, Nebraska, had been placed on 780 kHz, which meant they had to synchronize their programming during nighttime hours. To eliminate this restriction, in 1944, a reassignment plan was announced that moved KFAB to 1110 kHz, which in turn required WBT to start operating with a directional antenna at night, to limit its signal toward KFAB. To mitigate the reduction in nighttime coverage, in July 1947, a 1,000-watt "booster" transmitter, operating on the same frequency as the main transmitter, and located five miles (8 km) northeast of Shelby, North Carolina, was authorized "for benefit of nighttime listeners west of Charlotte". Unlike some similar implementations, including KYW and WBZ, the booster transmitter was not given its own call sign, and was included as part of the WBT operating license. Use of the booster transmitter ended sometime in the early 1960s.

New FCC regulations forced CBS to sell WBT when the network reached the maximum number of stations it could own. In 1945, it was acquired by the Jefferson Standard Life Insurance Company, forerunner of Jefferson-Pilot, and became its flagship station. After the sale, it remained a CBS affiliate. In 1947, an FM sister station at 99.9 MHz was put on the air. But that WBT-FM was discontinued in the mid-1950s and is not same as the later WBT-FM 99.3, which first went on the air in 1969 as WCMJ, owned by the York-Clover Broadcasting Company. In 1949, Jefferson Standard signed on the Carolinas' first television station, WBTV. It has been with the CBS Television Network since its sign-on, mirroring its radio sister.

=== Early hosts ===
Grady Cole was WBT morning host for 32 years, replaced in 1961 by Ty Boyd, who hosted the morning show until 1973, playing such artists as Duke Ellington, Peggy Lee and Petula Clark. Then Boyd moved to WBTV to host television shows. He returned to WBT in 2008 to co-host the morning show while its regular hosts took time off.

=== Changes in the 1970s ===
WBT was the number one station in Charlotte for many years. Among its employees were Charles Kuralt and Nelson Benton. But by 1970, WBT was down to number nine in the ratings, and national advertisers wanted ratings to improve. Jefferson Standard did not like the idea of change, but the company brought in researchers to show what programming Charlotte wanted. WBT let go 28 staffers and spent $200,000 on changes that included new studios. It also canceled many programs that advertisers supported but which did not attract enough listeners.

On March 15, 1971, WBT switched to adult contemporary music during the day. Rob Hunter and H. A. Thompson were new DJs. WBT had been a "good music" station with news and features. The new sound included "livelier disc jockeys" and artists that included Chicago, The Supremes and Bobby Sherman. Operations program manager Tom McMurray, hired in November 1970, said WBT would not be a "rock" station, that meant "a different type of station than what we're shooting for. We're youthful, but not youth-oriented." Harold Hinson had become managing director and July 1970 and a research firm surveyed people to find out what they wanted. Hinson said the changes had been planned for 15 months, after he traveled and heard what was happening in radio, deciding "we should be keeping up to date". Hinson said, "I think we'll appeal to all ages" including "a 45-year-old man, his 20-year-old married daughter, and her 27-year-old brother." Johnny Evans, Gil Stamper and Rich Pauley left the station and WBT dropped its CBS News affiliation. Some religious programming was kept, but not the daily syndicated shows. WAYS and WIST, which targeted listeners ages 12 to 34 with rock, believed WBT was trying to take listeners away from them. Jerry Shinn of WAYS said WBT "isn't paced the way we are," so it wouldn't work. Jack Gurley of WIST doubted WBT could successfully mix Broadway show tunes with Three Dog Night. Bob Lacey started at WBT in 1972 with a nighttime talk show "Lacey Listens". Also in 1972, McMurray left the station November 1, replaced by former assistant program manager Jack G. Petrey. In 1973, Truckin' Tom Miller joined the station from WGBG in Greensboro. One year later, WBT had reached number one again, reaching the highest Arbitron numbers on record to this day. Around the same time, the station dropped its longtime affiliation with the CBS Radio Network and joined ABC Radio. WBT won Billboard adult contemporary station of the year in 1976 and 1978.

In 1978, Marty Lambert became Jeff Pilot, the traffic reporter for WBT and WBCY. Lambert became assistant program director and music director in 1982.

Larry James, who joined WBT in September 1975, had a midnight to 6 A.M. shift Monday through Saturday where he talked, played country music, and took calls from truck drivers and others from as far away as Canada and Florida. He left WBT for WYDE in Birmingham, Alabama in November 1978 after winning the Country Music Association Disc Jockey of the Year for medium markets. Then he returned to WBT for the same shift in January 1979.

=== Talk shows at night ===
In September 1979, Henry Boggan, who had been a midday host and program director at WBIG in Greensboro, North Carolina, began hosting a talk show. it was similar to "Lacey Listens", with "nice-guy" talk, not controversial issues. Like Lacey's, which received calls from far away, his show would reach a large number of listeners. The show ran from 9 P.M. to 1 am, meaning Don Russell's show would start two hours earlier at 5 and run for four hours instead of five, and James' overnight show would start an hour later.

WBT dropped its ABC affiliation in favor of NBC Radio in 1987. Talk programming continued to increase on WBT through the 1980s, mostly at night. Larry King, on the Mutual Broadcasting System, moved from WSOC and stayed on WBT until 1987, when WBT decided its new NBC affiliation needed to take priority over other networks. Bruce Williams' syndicated financial advice show, part of the NBC Talknet block, replaced King. WBT expanded "Hello Henry" and its "Sports Huddle" program.

For their entire 14 years in Charlotte, starting with the inaugural 1988–89 season, WBT aired the games of the original NBA Hornets franchise.

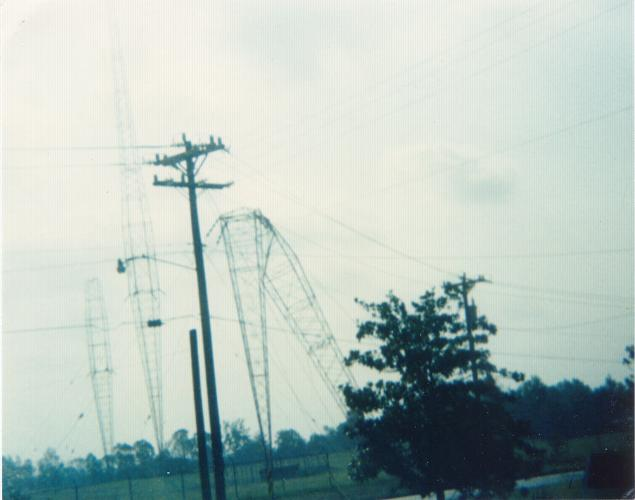
In 1989, two of WBT's three transmitter towers were badly damaged by Hurricane Hugo

In the morning hours of September 22, 1989, high winds from Hurricane Hugo severely damaged two of WBT's towers and nearly killed then-Chief Engineer, Bob White. The FCC approved WBT to operate at 25,000 watts with a non-directional pattern for the next year while the damaged towers were rebuilt.

=== Seeking more women listeners ===
WBT made changes to its format on December 10, 1990, hoping to attract more women. The station dropped James K. Flynn, Thompson and Tom Desio, generating numerous protests. Don Russell had hosted "Russell & Flynn" in the morning; the show was renamed "Russell & Friends". John Hancock became midday host, and WBTV personalities Mike and Barbara McKay began an afternoon program. Boggan, whose show had run in the afternoon, returned to his evening slot, replacing Desio, but was sometimes pre-empted by sports programs. WBT also switched its network affiliation from NBC back to CBS on December 21

=== Adding Rush Limbaugh ===
On September 3, 1991, WBT dropped the McKays and became the 400th station to air The Rush Limbaugh Show, which had already been heard in the Charlotte area on WADA in Shelby, WSIC in Statesville and WHKY in Hickory.

In 1995, Jefferson-Pilot bought WBZK, 99.3 in Chester, South Carolina, to provide a simulcast signal that better served the western part of the market at night. At this time the FM station's callsign was changed to WBT-FM. That same year the station began airing games of the NFL Carolina Panthers inaugural season until 1999, returning as the team's flagship station in 2005.

Lincoln Financial Group bought Jefferson-Pilot in 2006. The merged company retained Jefferson-Pilot's broadcasting division, renaming it Lincoln Financial Media. In January 2008, Lincoln Financial sold WBT-AM-FM and WLNK to Greater Media of Braintree, Massachusetts. Lincoln-Financial then sold its three television stations, including WBTV, to Raycom Media—thus breaking up Charlotte's last heritage radio/television cluster. Greater Media had long wanted to expand into the fast-growing Charlotte market; its owner had wanted to buy WBT after hearing its signal at night on Cape Cod.

=== Sports ===
WBT was the flagship station of the Carolina Panthers from the team's 1995 inception until 1999, when WRFX became the flagship. WBT regained the rights to air Panthers games starting with the 2005 season until the agreement ended in 2021, when WRFX once again became the flagship of the Carolina Panthers radio network.

WBT was the flagship of the Charlotte Hornets from the team's debut in 1988 until the team moved to New Orleans in 2002. From 1991 to 1995, WBT was the Charlotte-area home of the Duke Blue Devils. It was also the Charlotte home of the University of North Carolina Tar Heels from 1977 to 1991 and again from 1995 to 2006. The Tar Heels returned to WBT in 2012. For most of the 1980s and early 1990s, it aired Washington Redskins football.

Also in 2006, WBT lost the North Carolina Tar Heels to all sports WFNZ. Sales director Steve Sklenar said the games pre-empted John Hancock's show and, during the ACC Tournament, Rush Limbaugh. WBT wanted the games, Sklenar said, but the pre-emptions cost the station advertising revenue. The Tar Heels had aired on WBT from 1977 to 1991, and returned to the station in 1995. According to Cullie Tarleton, who ran the station at that time, putting the Tar Heels on WBT was largely the idea of longtime coach Dean Smith, who wanted to tell recruits from the New York City area that their parents would be able to listen to the games.

On May 5, 2012, WBT signed back on with the Tar Heel Sports Network to be Charlotte's main carrier of the Tar Heels. After WRFX carried night basketball games for several years, WNOW-FM took over until 2012. With this switch back, games could now be heard all up and down the Eastern Seaboard at night, as WBT's clear channel signal can be heard from "Maine to Miami".

=== Programming changes ===
On June 8, 2012, WBT announced that The Brad and Britt Show, hosted by Brad Krantz and Britt Whitmire of WPTK in Raleigh, would be taking over the afternoon slot from Vince Coakley effective July 2. Krantz and libertarian Richard Spires had a show on WBT prior to 2003. In June 2013, the show moved to 6 pm-9 pm; Hancock would take over the 3 pm-6 pm afternoon drive slot, where he remained until semi-retiring in October 2019, after nearly 30 years at WBT.

On November 15, 2013, both WBT and WBTV were dedicated with a North Carolina historic marker at the corner of Tryon Street and Third Street. The Wilder Building, which was demolished in 1983, hosted the WBT's studios from 1924 to 1955. The sign reads "WBT/WBTV – Oldest broadcast stations in North Carolina established 1922. WBT radio long hosted live country music. WBTV sign-on, July 15, 1949. Studios here until 1955."

On March 3, 2014, WBT again dropped CBS News and returned to ABC News. In making the move, the station cited the stronger resources ABC's reporters provides to WBT's local programming compared to CBS and Fox News Radio.

=== Sale to Entercom ===
On July 19, 2016, Greater Media announced that it would merge with Beasley Media Group. Because Beasley already had the maximum number of stations in the Charlotte market with 5 FMs and 2 AMs, WBT-AM-FM and WLNK were spun off to a divestiture trust, eventually going to a permanent buyer. On October 18, 2016, Entercom announced that it would purchase WBT-AM-FM and WLNK, plus WFNZ. Upon the completion of the Greater/Beasley merger on November 1, Entercom began operating the stations via a time brokerage agreement, which lasted until the sale was consummated on January 6, 2017.

former logo

=== Sale to Urban One ===
On November 5, 2020, Urban One agreed to a station swap with Entercom in which they would swap ownership of four stations in Philadelphia, St. Louis and Washington, D.C. to Entercom in exchange for their cluster of Charlotte stations, including WBT and WBT-FM. As part of the terms of the deal, Urban One took over operations via a local marketing agreement on November 23. The swap was consummated on April 20, 2021.

=== Programming shifts ===
On December 11, 2025, WBT's FM simulcast partner for its news-talk-sports programming was changed from a station on 99.3 to a more powerful one on 107.9. At the same time, the new FM partner changed its callsign from WLNK to WBT-FM. It was also announced that this simulcast was only temporary, and WBT would later change to a new, undisclosed, format. On January 8, at midnight, the station ended regular broadcasts, and began running a recurring message directing listeners to tune to 107.9 FM for the WBT news/talk format.

== Past hosts ==
Past hosts include "Hello Henry" Boggan, Ty Boyd, Grady Cole, John Hancock, Mike Collins, "Rockin'" Ray Gooding, Bob Lacey, Jason Lewis and H.A. Thompson.

Don Russell is the station's longest-tenured personality, having worked at the station on six separate occasions since the 1970s.

From 2009 until March 31, 2011, Pete Kaliner hosted a local program in the 9 p.m.-midnight slot, but was fired in a cost-cutting move by Greater Media. Neal Boortz's syndicated show was heard on tape delay from 9 p.m.-1 a.m.; however, this was a temporary move as nationally syndicated host and former WBT personality Jason Lewis began to be heard on the station from 9-midnight (on a three-hour delay from his live broadcast) beginning in May 2011.

Nearly two months after Kaliner's departure, Tara Servatius' contract was not renewed; Doug Kellett and Wayne Powers filled the 3-6 p.m. slot on an interim basis while the station searched for a replacement. On June 22, 2011, former WSOC-TV lead anchor Vince Coakley, who had done fill-in work at WBT before, was named Servatius' replacement in the 3-6 p.m. timeslot. Coakley left after a little over a year and was replaced on July 2, 2012, by Brad Krantz (a former WBT host) and Britt Whitmire, formerly of WZTK. Krantz and Whitmire, in turn, were fired by the station on June 11, 2014, and were replaced by John Hancock, who moved up from evenings (6-9 p.m.) and a 6 p.m. local news hour hosted by Mark Garrison and a local show with former WFNZ host Brett Jensen from 7-10 p.m. Coakley, who became the Republican candidate for North Carolina's 12th District U.S. House seat in 2012, returned to the station in 2017.

In December 2012, morning co-host Stacey Simms left Charlotte's Morning News to spend more time with her family. On January 14, 2013, Charlotte native Doc Washburn, most recently a morning host at WFLF-FM in Panama City Beach, Florida, debuted in the 9 p.m.-1 a.m. slot, bringing local talk to the timeslot for the first time in nearly two years, replacing Lewis and the retired Boortz. The show would be replaced by the nationally syndicated America Now with Andy Dean in May 2013; Washburn remained with the station as a fill-in host.

Following Entercom's takeover of WBT via LMA on October 31, 2016, Keith Larson, the station's longtime 9 a.m.-noon host, was fired. The station ran a rotation of fill-in hosts while searching for his replacement before hiring Scott Fitzgerald, former morning host for WPTF in Raleigh, for the slot. Scott was released in November 2017.

== See also ==
- List of initial AM-band station grants in the United States
- List of three-letter broadcast call signs in the United States
