= Bernard Glueck Sr. =

Bernard Charles Glueck Sr. (December 10, 1884 - October 5, 1972) was a Polish-American forensic psychiatrist and psychoanalyst. He established the first prison psychiatric clinic and was an expert witness in the Leopold and Loeb trial. He also served as president of the American Psychopathological Association in 1945.

== Life and career ==
Glueck was born in Poland and emigrated to the United States in 1900. He earned his medical degree from Georgetown University in 1909, then started a career in public health.

Glueck founded the first prison psychiatric clinic at Sing Sing Prison in 1915. He served in the Medical Corps of the United States Army, starting in 1918. In 1920, he introduced his brother Sheldon Glueck to his brother's future wife Eleanor Glueck. Sheldon and Eleanor Glueck went on to have a lifelong collaboration studying juvenile delinquency.

Later, Glueck worked for the New York School of Social Work (which would later become the Columbia University School of Social Work) and the New York City Board of Education Bureau of Child Guidance.

In 1924, Clarence Darrow sought out Glueck and two other alienists to testify for the defense the kidnapping/murder trial of Nathan Leopold and Richard Loeb. Both were convicted.

Glueck founded the private Stony Lodge Hospital in Ossining, New York, in 1927. After retiring in 1947, Glueck continued to work for the Veterans Administration, the University of North Carolina, and John Umstead Hospital in Butner, North Carolina.

His son Bernard Glueck Jr. (1914–1999) was also a psychiatrist, affiliated with the Institute for Living in Connecticut.

== Selected publications ==
- Studies in Forensic Psychology (1916)
- Translator from German to English of Alfred Adler's opus magnum, The neurotic constitution: Outlines of a comparative individualistic psychology and psychotherapy (1917)
- A study of 608 admissions to Sing Sing Prison (1918)
- The psychoanalysis of the total personality: The application of Freud's theory of the ego to the neuroses (1935)
- A Note on War Psychiatry (1942)
- Social psychopathology (1949)
