= Gere Glück =

German canoeist

Medal record

Men's canoe slalom

Representing West Germany

World Championships
Bronze medal – third place	1967 Lipno	C-2 team

Gere Glück is a retired West German slalom canoeist who competed from the mid-1960s to the early 1970s. He won a bronze medal in the C-2 team event at the 1967 ICF Canoe Slalom World Championships in Lipno.
