= Bernard Glueck Jr. =

American psychiatrist (1914–1999)

Bernard Charles Glueck Jr. (August 26, 1914 – July 24, 1999) was an American psychiatrist. He served as director of research at The Institute of Living, now part of Hartford Hospital. He is known for his work on transcendental meditation as part of preventive psychiatry.

== Life and career ==
His father Bernard Glueck Sr. was a prominent forensic psychiatrist. Glueck graduated from Columbia College, Columbia University in 1934 and Harvard Medical School in 1938. He then trained in psychoanalysis at Columbia University Psychoanalytic Clinic. Gleuck served as professor and director of research in the department of psychology at the University of Minnesota Medical School. Following in his father's footsteps, he was supervising psychiatrist at Ossining State Prison from 1949 to 1952. He was the first president of the Westchester County Psychiatric Association. He joined The Institute of Living in 1960.

He served as chairman of research and development for the American Psychiatric Association He also served as president of the American Psychopathological Association, chairman of the Narcotic Addiction and Drug Abuse Review Committee of the National Institute of Mental Health, and chairman of the Connecticut Council of Corrections Officers.

Glueck married in 1936 and remained married for 63 years. He and his spouse died within days of each other in Goshen, Connecticut.

== Selected publications ==
- Glueck, Bernard C. Jr., Final report: Research project for the study and treatment of persons convicted of crimes involving sexual aberrations. June 1952 to June 1955. New York State Department of Mental Hygiene/University of Minnesota
- Hammer, Emmanuel F.; Glueck, Bernard C Jr (1955). Psychodynamic patterns in sex offender. Proceedings of the annual meeting of the American Psychopathological Association. 1955:157-68. PMID 13245805
- Glueck, Bernard C. Jr., Evaluation of the Homosexual Offender. Minn. L. Rev. 187, An; 41 (1956-1957)
- Glueck, Bernard C.; Stroebel, Charles F. (1975-07-01). "Biofeedback and meditation in the treatment of psychiatric illnesses". Comprehensive Psychiatry. 16 (4): 303–321. doi:10.1016/S0010-440X(75)80001-0. PMID 1157476.
