= Ernst Glück Bible Museum =

Museum in Latvia

Coordinates: 57.4245°N 27.0488°E

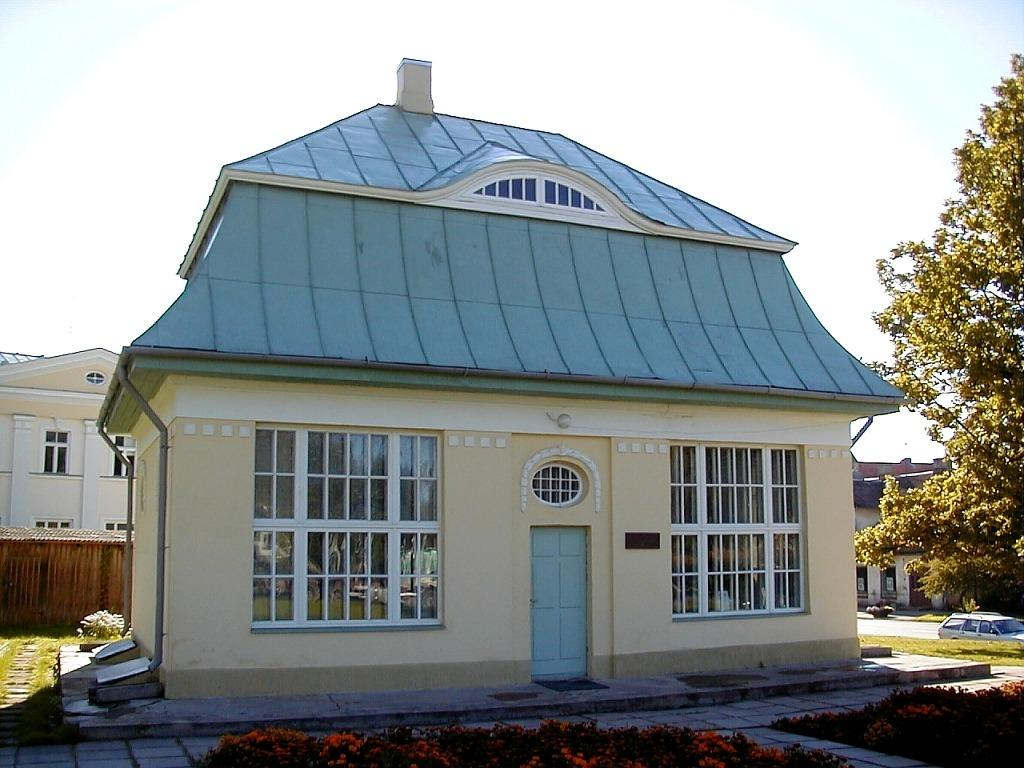
Ernst Glück Bible Museum in 2000

Ernst Glück Bible Museum (Latvian: Ernsta Glika Bībeles muzejs) is a Latvian Christian museum in Alūksne in Latvia.

This is the building in which Johann Ernst Glück famously translated the Holy Bible into the Latvian language in 1694. In 1990, it was opened as a museum to honour his work. The building holds a first edition of Glück's Bible, as well as other translations.

Glück lived in the building with his family. They also fostered an orphan named Marta Skowrońska who went on to become Catherine I of Russia.

The town also hosts two oak trees which Glück planted when he completed the translation of the Old Testament and the New Testament.
