= Glick =

Glick or Glik is a surname that is an Ashkenazi Jewish variation of the German surname Glück. Notable people and fictional characters with the surname include:

== People ==
=== Glick ===
- Adam Glick (born 1984), American chef and television personality on Below Deck Mediterranean
- Alexis Glick (born 1972), a national television personality who was a temporary host for the third hour of NBC's Today Show in 2006
- Alex Glick, a boy who won a raffle to appear in "Red Man's Greed", a South Park episode
- Caroline Glick, American-Israeli journalist, deputy managing editor of the Jerusalem Post
- Deborah Glick (born 1950), American politician
- Elmo Glick, pseudonym of songwriters Jerry Leiber and Mike Stoller
- George Washington Glick (1827–1911), American politician
- Hirsh Glick (1922–1944), poet from the Vilna Ghetto, writer of the lyrics for the partisan song "Zog nit Keynmol"
- Jeff Glick (died 1985), American bridge player
- Jeremy Glick (1970–2001), a passenger on United Airlines Flight 93 who, with others, tried to take back the airliner from September 11 hijackers
- Larry Glick (1922–2009), Boston radio talk show host
- Peter Glick (American football) (1922–1986), American football player and coach
- Richard Glick, American government official
- Robert Glick, director of the Columbia University Center for Psychoanalytic Training and Research
- Roman Glick, bass guitarist for the American rock band Jackyl
- Ruth Glick (born 1942), American writer of cookbooks, romance and young adult novels
- Shimon Glick (born 1932), Israeli physician
- Shmuel Glick, Jewish theologian
- Srul Irving Glick (1934–2002), Canadian composer, radio producer, conductor and teacher
- Stacey Glick (born 1971), American former child actress
- Thomas F. Glick (born 1939), historian of science
- Wolfe Glick (born 1995), American streamer and YouTuber
- Yehudah Glick (born 1965), Israeli activist

=== Glik ===
- Kamil Glik (born 1988), Polish footballer
- Moritz Glik (born 1962), Brazilian naturalized American jewelry designer
- Simon Glik of the Glik v. Cunniffe case

== Fictional characters ==
- Jiminy Glick, in the TV series Primetime Glick (2001–2003), portrayed by Martin Short
- Max Glick, a young Jewish coming-of-the-age boy in a novel, a film adaptation and a TV series
- The Glick family in the novel 'Salem's Lot by Stephen King
- Mrs. Glick or Alice Glick, an elderly woman who resided in Springfield on The Simpsons.

== See also ==
- Glik's, American retail clothing chain based in Granite City, Illinois, founded in 1897 by Joseph Glik
- Klik (candy), an Israeli chocolate brand, now sold under the name Klik
- Gallick, surname
