= Gluek =

Gluek may refer to:

== Places ==
United States

- Gluek, Minnesota, unincorporated community
- Gluek Brewery in Minneapolis, Minnesota
- Grace Gluek, an art reviewer for The New York Times
- Gluek Park, a park in Minneapolis, Minnesota
- Gluek House and Carriage House, a house on the National Register of Historic Places in Minneapolis, Minnesota

== See also ==
- Glück
