= Malcolm Gluck =

British author, broadcaster and wine columnist

Malcolm Gluck is a British author, broadcaster and wine columnist.

== Career ==
Initially an advertising copywriter for Collett Dickenson Pearce, Doyle Dane Bernbach, a founder employee of Abbott Mead Vickers BBDO and later creative director for Lintas, Gluck was for sixteen years the wine correspondent of The Guardian with the column "Superplonk". In addition to contributing articles for other publications, including Harpers Magazine he was a wine critic of The Oldie until 2011, and the author of 36 books about wine. Among his titles are Superplonk, Streetplonk, Brave New World and The Great Wine Swindle. He also featured in the BBC programme Gluck, Gluck, Gluck.

Gluck has been described as a "self-styled champion of the ordinary wine drinker, fighting against the perceived snobbery and stuffiness of the wine world".

In November 2008 a survey by the wine industry consultancy firm Wine Intelligence was made public, having polled the views of more than 1,500 regular UK wine drinkers, results show that Gluck was the fifth most recognised wine critic in the UK.

=== Controversies ===
Appearing in the Channel 4 episode of Dispatches titled "What's in your wine?" in 2008, Gluck stated, "Many, many wines are no better than a sort of alcoholic cola. You get artificial yeasts, enzymes, sugar, extracts, tannins, all sorts of things added", a statement widely received with outrage in the wine industry.

Gluck's other controversial statements include, "Terroir is rubbish. It is complete utter balderdash from the first syllable of its pretentious and mendacious utterance to its last". In reference to his opposition to cork stoppers, Gluck has stated, "Sticking a cork made from tree bark in a wine made in 1999 is like producing a modern motor car with a starting handle".

In the book The Great Wine Swindle, Gluck contends that the wine industry is "populated by liars, scroungers and cheats, administered by charlatans and snake-oil salesman and run on a system of misrepresentation and ritualised fraud".

Gluck has also been involved in a public disagreement with author Salman Rushdie over who is the quicker book-signer.

In January 2009, Gluck made a series of contentions on the nature of beer drinkers in the "Word of Mouth" pages of The Guardian, in an article asserting the rising numbers of wine drinkers in Britain, stating that "beer is only drunk by losers and sadsacks, unsexy people who care nothing for their minds or their bodies," and, "are also terrible lovers, awful husbands, and untidy flatmates". The statements drew prompt responses from beer writers Roger Protz and Melissa Cole, with Gluck challenged by Cole to appear at a beer and food pairing event.

=== Charity work ===
Gluck hosted deafblind charity Sense's first ever blind wine auction in October 2006, guiding guests through a wide variety of wine as they tasted the drinks in total darkness. The event was held at Dans Le Noir, a London restaurant where customers eat in the dark, which is one of Sense's corporate partners.

== See also ==
- List of wine personalities
