= Peter Glick (American football) =

American football player and coach (1922–1986)

Biographical details
- Born: 1922
- Died: 1986 (aged 63–64)

Playing career

Football
- 1941–1944: Princeton

Coaching career (HC unless noted)

Football
- 1946–1947: TCNJ (assistant)
- 1950: Delaware Valley

Head coaching record
- Overall: 1–5–1

Peter J. Glick Jr. (1922 – September 1986) was an author and an American football player and coach. He served as the head football coach at Delaware Valley University 1950.
