= Themistocles Gluck =

German physician and surgeon and inventor of endoprostheses

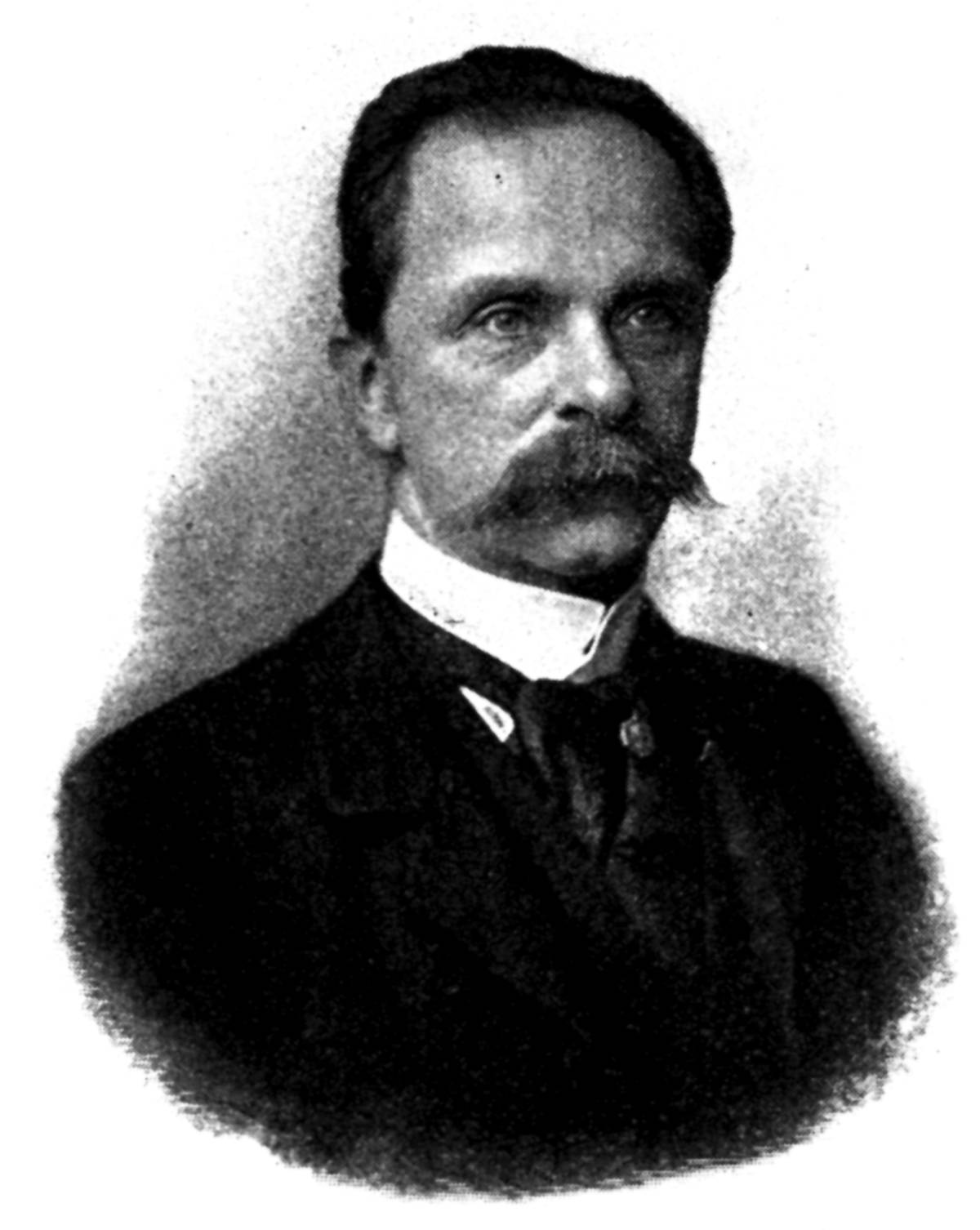
- Themistocles Gluck
- Born: 30 November 1853; Iaşi, Moldavia
- Died: 25 April 1942 (aged 88); Berlin
- Citizenship: Romania, Germany
- Known for: endoprostheses
- Scientific career
- Fields: medicine

Themistocles Gluck (30 November 1853 in Iaşi, Moldavia – 25 April 1942 in Berlin) was a German physician and surgeon. He first invented endoprostheses from ivory in 1890 at Berlin, when he performed the first documented total wrist Arthroplasty. He received the 1st State Prize of the Berlin University for his work on nerve suturing and nerve regeneration. The French surgeons Louis Léopold Ollier and Jules Péan had already recognized Gluck's importance in the 1890s. With his laryngeal surgery, he achieved world renown. Nevertheless, it took a long time for him to receive the academic recognition he deserved as a non-university surgeon. It was not until he was 70 years old (1922) that he was made an associate professor and even nominated for the Nobel Prize (unsuccessfully, because his work was considered too old at the time). He also performed the 1st Knee Replacement for a patient suffering from Tubercolosis of the knee in 1891 using an implant made of ivory which was called Kneischarni-erapparat (Hinged knee Apparatus).

== Works ==
- About neuroplastics on the way to transplantation. Archive for Clinical Surgery. Volume 25, 1880, p. 606–616
- About transplant, regeneration and inflammatory new formation. Berlin Clinical Weekly. Volume 18, 1881, pp. 529 ff.
- The invagination method of osteo- and arthroplasty. Berlin clinical weekly. Volume 19, 1890, p. 732–736
- Presentation on the positive results obtained through the modern surgical experiment, on the seam and the replacement of detections of higher tissue. Archive for Clinical Surgery. Volume 41, 1891 6, p. 15
- Autoplastic transplant – implantation of foreign bodies. Berlin Clinical Weekly. Volume 27, 1890, p. 421–427
- Development of lung surgery. Archive for Clinical Surgery. Volume 83, 1907, p. 581–601
- D. Wessinghage: Themistocles Gluck – From organ extirpation to joint replacement. German Medical Journal. Volume 33, 1995
