= Gustav Glück =

Austrian art historian

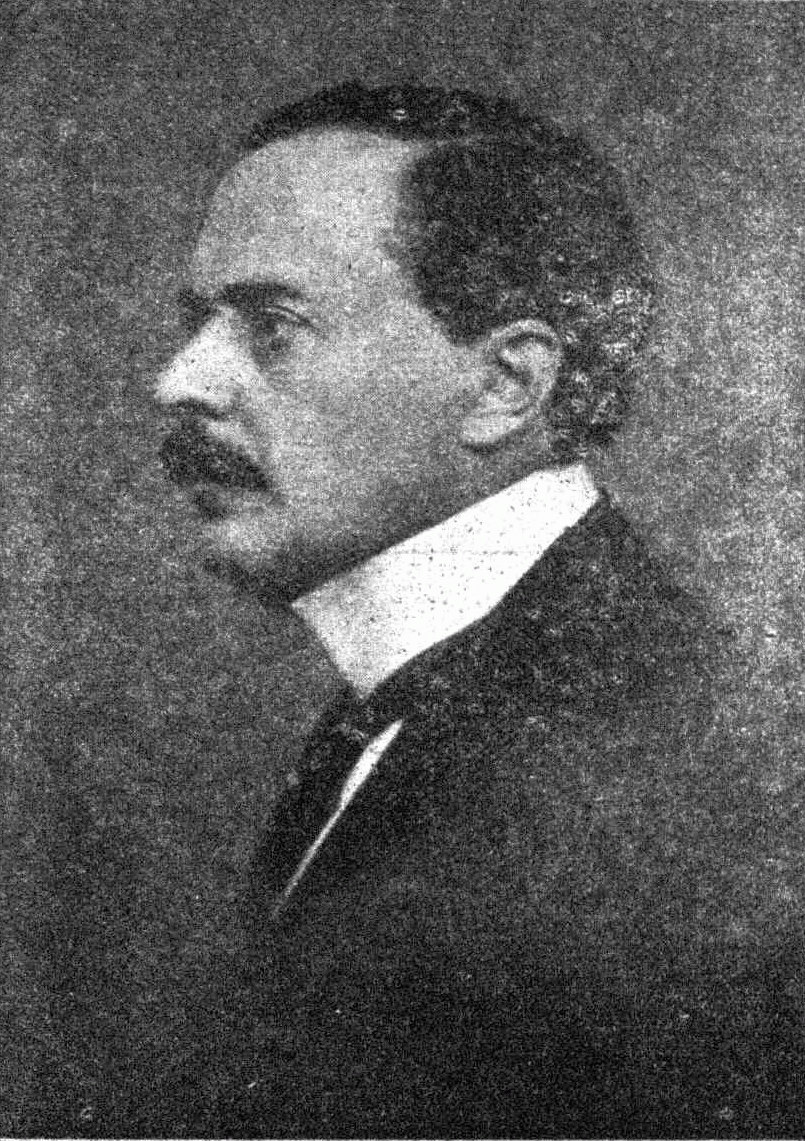
Gustav Gluck (1914)

Gustav Glück (6 April 1871, Vienna – 18 November 1952, Santa Monica, Cal.) was an Austrian art historian, the author of several major books on Dutch art.

Glück became an Assistant at the Vienna Kunsthistorisches Museum in 1900, Curator and de facto Director in 1911, and Director in name in 1916. He resigned the directorship of the Vienna Gallery in 1931, moved from Vienna to London in 1938, and moved to Santa Monica in 1942. As a Festschrift, his students published a two-volume annotated collection of his periodical articles in 1933.

== Literary works ==
- Die Kunst der Renaissance in Deutschland, in Niederlanden, Frankreich, 1933
- Bruegels Gemälde, 1934
- Die Landschaften von D. D. Rubens, 1942
