= Earle J. Gluck =

Earle Jackson Gluck (May 23, 1901 – February 19, 1972), was a radio and television pioneer. He was born in Baltimore, Maryland, and in the summer of 1915 was issued an amateur radio station license with the call sign 3AIF, for use at his home in Hamilton. During World War I he served as a chief radioman for the U.S. Navy. He later moved to Charlotte, North Carolina, becoming a Westinghouse Electric and Manufacturing Company engineer, where he was relicensed as amateur station 4CQ.

Most amateurs at this time used spark transmitters that could only transmit the dots-and-dashes of Morse code, however a Gluck associate, Fred Laxton, managed to acquire a scarce vacuum tube from General Electric, which made audio transmissions possible. Gluck and Laxton, along with Frank Bunker, set up a transmitter in an abandoned chicken coop located behind Laxton's home, with a microphone line running to the home's living room. Their initial transmissions eventually were expanded into the playing of phonograph records, which resulted in enough interest that a regular schedule of broadcasts was established. In late 1920 Laxton's station was issued an Experimental license with the call sign 4XD.

The trio decided to go commercial, and incorporated the Southern Radio Corporation in December 1921. In March 1922 the company was issued a broadcasting station license with the call letters WBT, which made its debut broadcast on the 22nd as "the first station that has been erected and put in active operating condition in the Carolinas".

In 1933 Gluck brought station WSOC (now WHVN) to Charlotte, becoming president and general manager. He also was an active community leader and served on the Housing Authority of the city beginning in 1938, and as that board's chairman from 1968 to his death. He was a charter member of the Charlotte Amateur Radio Club and was instrumental in offering guidance and advice in its organization. (The call sign used by the club's station, W4CQ, was originally held by Gluck). Gluck also served in organizations such as the Kiwanis Club, Civitan Club, and the Boy Scouts of America.

After he died in Charlotte in 1972 — becoming a "Silent Key" in amateur radio parlance — his wife donated some of his amateur radio equipment to the Club. In 2015, he was included in the inaugural class of the Charlotte Broadcast Hall of Fame.
