= Louis Gluck =

American neonatologist (1924–1997)

Louis Gluck (1924–1997) was an American neonatologist who made many important contributions to the care of newborns, and who is considered "the father of neonatology."

== Career overview ==
Gluck designed the modern neonatal intensive care unit (NICU); developed protocols which reduced spread of serious bacterial infections in newborns; and developed a laboratory test, called the L/S ratio, which accurately predicted the chance that a newborn would develop infant respiratory distress syndrome.

He received over 35 national and international awards for his work in the field of neonatology. He is a member of the Rutgers University Hall of Distinguished Alumni.
