= Barbara Gluck =

American photojournalist

Barbara Gluck (born 1938) is a retired American photojournalist, art photographer, speaker, writer, and spiritual healing facilitator.

After an early career in advertising, she spent almost four years in Vietnam and produced award-winning photojournalism during the Vietnam War. In the late 1970s she worked as an art photographer, and her "Light Painting" series was exhibited in multiple major museum shows.

In the early 1980s, she co-founded the Light Institute, a center for "spiritual healing and multi-incarnational exploration" run by Chris Griscom in Galisteo, in New Mexico. In the late 1980s, Gluck went on to found the Global Light Network and the Soul Matrix Clearing, Healing and Empowerment System, which focused on releasing "The Primordial Imprints of Separation from God". She has taken this around the world.

== Biography ==
Gluck was born in New York, the daughter of Hungarian immigrants Theodore Gluck (born Tivadar Glück, 1908 - ?), a diamond setter, and Elizabeth Gluck (Born Erzsébet Hercz, 1906-2002).

She graduated from NYU with a major in communication arts and a minor in journalism, entering a career in advertising with McCann Erickson and later Benton & Bowles, before the president of the Young & Rubicam agency hired her as a Special Advisor. Her career as a photojournalist began in earnest during the Vietnam War. She was based in Saigon 1968/69 and 1972/73, working mostly for The New York Times. In 1976 she moved to Santa Fe, New Mexico and began her work as an art photographer, with a major exhibit "The Stream" opening at The Museum of Fine Arts in Santa Fe in 1979. She continued her photojournalism as well. During the 1970s she lectured, co-produced the first New Mexico Film and Photography Festival in Santa Fe's Armory for the Arts, and served (in 1978-79) as a Public Relations and Media Consultant to the Navajo Nation - during the Navajo Hopi Land Dispute Commission.

She currently resides in Santa Monica, California. In late 2019, she was featured in a series of articles produced by students at the University of Southern California Annenberg School of Journalism about lower-income older people living in Los Angeles.

== Vietnam photography ==
Gluck was one of numerous female photographers to cover the Vietnam War. During these detachments she both flew with the US military on a B-52 bombing mission and visited Viet Cong troops, whom she photographed for the cover of The New York Times. Mark Edward Harris, in art photography periodical B+W magazine, said "Barbara Gluck's photos have been called 'the Cartier-Bressons of the Vietnam War', and rightly so." In spring 2005, to mark the 30th anniversary of the war's end, the Vietnamese government invited her to participate as a keynote speaker at a "Conference of Reunion and Reconciliation" for contemporary Vietnamese journalists and for foreign journalists who had covered the war. She was also invited to speak at another conference, on "The Role of Journalism in the Development of Vietnam." During the visit she photographed images for a forthcoming book, Vietnam: Then and Now, commissioned to include both her black and white images from the 1970s and new images in color. In early 2005, the J.P. Getty Museum in Los Angeles purchased a portfolio of her vintage Vietnam prints for their permanent collection, and included one of her photographs in the exhibit “Pictures for The Press”, representing 35 images of historic events between 1940 and the 1970s.

== Naturopathic practice ==
In 1984, Gluck co-founded The Light Institute of Galisteo, New Mexico, an organization she later left to found a new company called The Global Light Network. She developed a healing process called the Soul Matrix Clearing, Healing and Empowerment Process which she taught around the world.

== Awards ==
Gluck received the 1973 World Press Photo Foundation award for Outstanding News Photo of the Year, and a Poynter Fellowship at Yale University for Excellence in Journalism in 1974.
