= Johann Ernst Glück =

Baltic German writer and theologian (1652–1705)

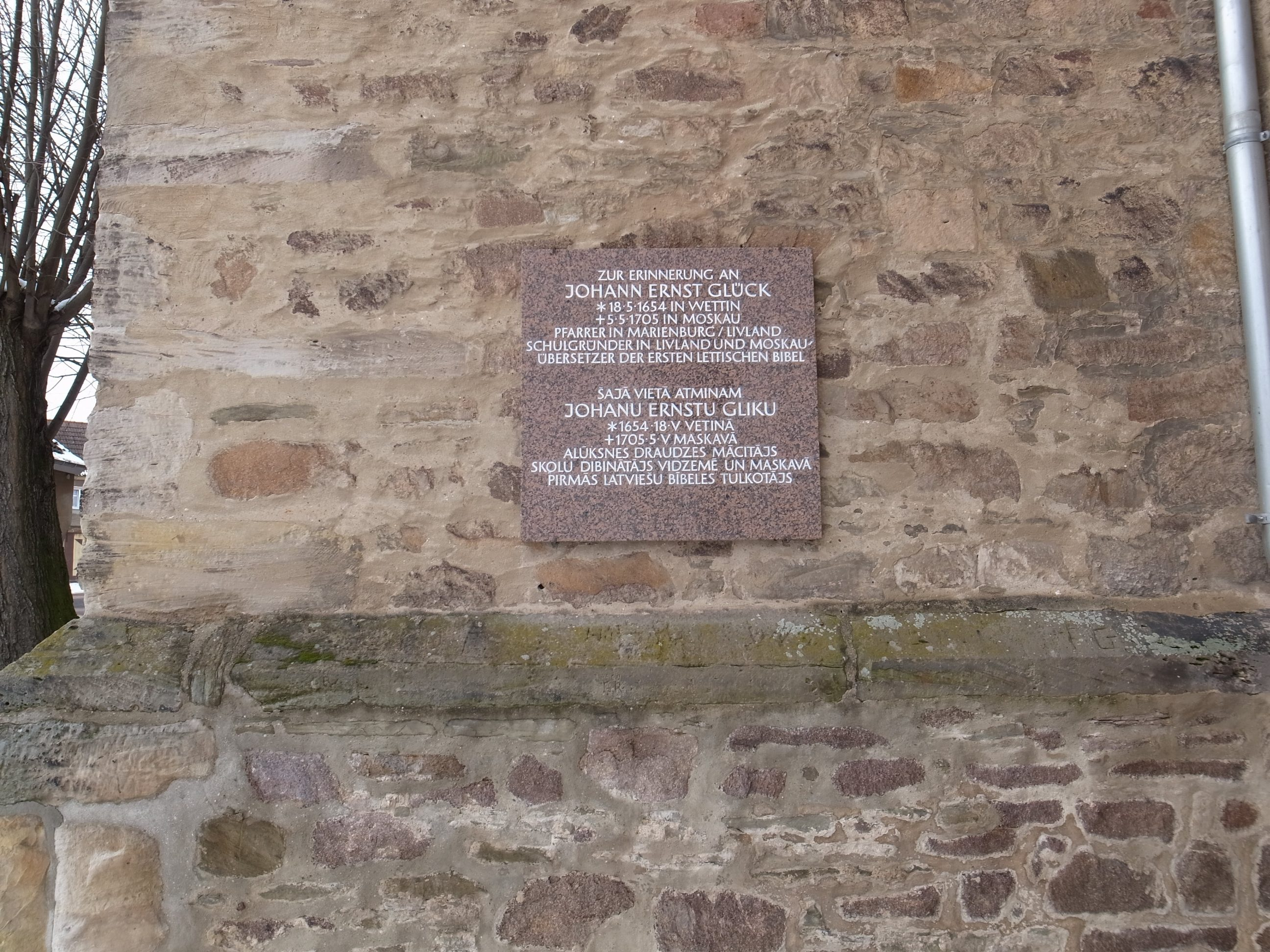
- Tomb of Glück
- Born: 18 May 1654; Wettin, Saxony-Anhalt
- Died: 5 May 1705 (aged 50); Moscow, Russian Empire
- Occupations: Theologian; translator

Signature
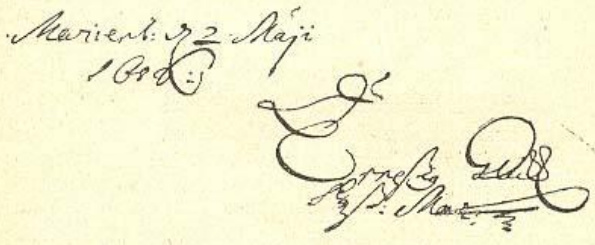

Johann Ernst Glück (Latvian: Johans Ernsts Gliks; 18 May 1654 – 5 May 1705) was a German translator and Lutheran theologian active in Livonia, which is now in Latvia.

== Early life and career ==
Glück was born in Wettin as the son of a pastor. After attending the Latin school of Altenburg, he studied theology, rhetoric, philosophy, geometry, history, geography, and Latin at Wittenberg and Jena.

Glück is known for being the first one to translate the Bible into Latvian, a project which he finished in 1694. It was carried out in its entirety in Marienburg (Alūksne) in Livonia, in the building which now houses the Ernst Glück Bible Museum, established to honour his work. He also founded the first Latvian language schools in Livonia in 1683. He died in Moscow.

== Personal life ==
He had four daughters, a son (Ernst Gottlieb Glück), and a foster-daughter Marta Skowrońska who married Peter I and is mainly known as Catherine I. From 1725 until 1727, she was empress of the Russian Empire.

== Bibliography ==
- "Mach dich auf und werde licht - Celies nu, topi gaiss" - Zu Leben und Werk von Ernst Glück (1654-1705). Akten der Tagung anlässlich seines 300. Todestages vom 10. bis 13. Mai 2005 in Halle (Saale). Herausgegeben von Schiller, Christiane / Grudule, Mara. Wiesbaden, Harrasowitz, 2010.
