= Herschel Gluck =

British rabbi

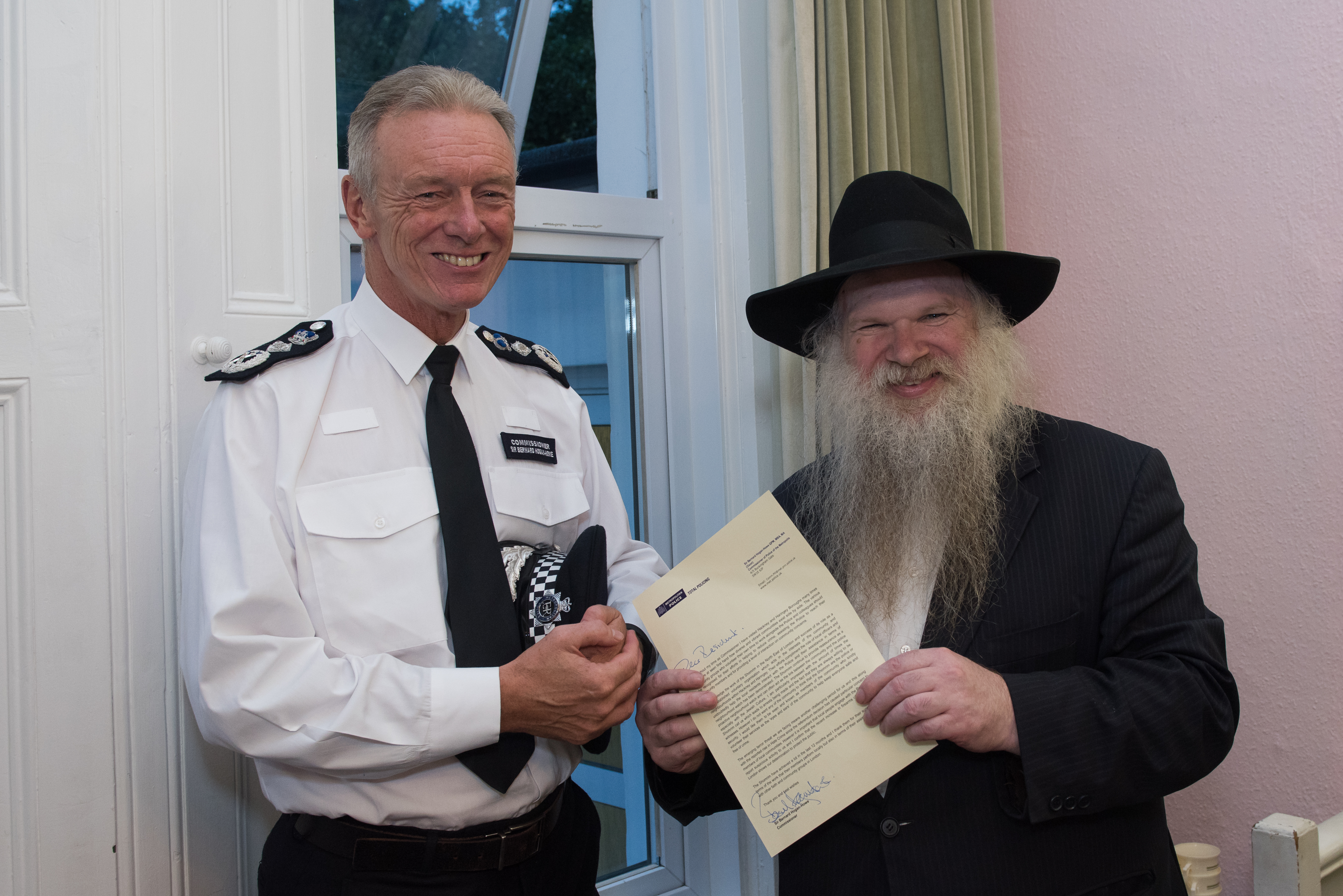
Gluck in 2016 with Metropolitan Police Commissioner Bernard Hogan-Howe

Herschel Gluck OBE is a British rabbi, president of the Shomrim in Stamford Hill, chairman of the Arab-Jewish Forum and chairman and founder of the Muslim-Jewish Forum. Established in 2000, the Muslim-Jewish Forum deals with issues of concern to both communities and also serves a role in preventing and defusing tensions.

He has also been involved with the Next Century Foundation, through which he has played a role as a mediator in conflicts in places as diverse as the Sudan and Former Yugoslavia.

Gluck was appointed Officer of the Order of the British Empire (OBE) in the 2013 New Year Honours for services to interfaith understanding.

In 2015 Gluck was appointed as the new President of the Stamford Hill Shomrim, a Jewish volunteer Neighbourhood Patrol Group.
