= Eleanor Glueck =

American social worker and criminologist

Eleanor Touroff Glueck (April 12, 1898 – September 25, 1972) was an American social worker and criminologist. She and her husband Sheldon Glueck collaborated extensively on research related to juvenile delinquency and developed the "social prediction tables" model for ascertaining the likelihood of delinquent behavior in youth. They were the first criminologists to perform studies of chronic juvenile offenders and among the first to examine the effects of psychopathy among the more serious delinquents.

== Life and career ==
Glueck was born Leonia Touroff in Brooklyn, New York, the only daughter of Russian immigrant Bernard Leo and Polish immigrant Anna Wodzislawska, although she had two brothers. Upon graduating from Hunter College High School in 1916, she majored in English at Barnard College and was awarded a B.A in 1920. She then entered the New York School of Social Work, where she met the psychologist Bernard Glueck, Sr., who was a forensic psychiatrist at Sing Sing Prison specializing in social work and criminology. She also met Bernard's brother Sheldon Glueck, who helped her become head social worker at the Dorchester Community Center of Boston from 1921 to 1922. She married Sheldon Glueck on April 16, 1922.

In 1922, Glueck began her graduate school studies at the Harvard Graduate School of Education. She was awarded a M.Ed. in 1923 and an Ed.D. in 1925 with a thesis on The Community Use of Schools. Their only child, Anitra Joyce (1924–1956) was a poet. Glueck worked at the Harvard Law School as a research assistant from 1928 until 1953, while her husband was a professor there.

Eleanor and Sheldon Glueck embarked upon an internationally recognized partnership in criminology that would last the remainder of their lives. They would collaborate on more than 250 publications, beginning with Five Hundred Criminal Careers (1930), followed by Five Hundred Delinquent Women (1934) and One Thousand Juvenile Delinquents (1934). For the juvenile delinquents, they made attempts to predict criminality using statistics, followed by the likelihood of their rehabilitation upon release. They were the first criminologists to perform studies of chronic juvenile offenders and among the first to examine the effects of psychopathy among the more serious delinquents. Their studies showed that psychopathy was 20 times more common among juvenile delinquents.

In 1940, they began a ten-year longitudinal study that was published as Unraveling Juvenile Delinquency (1950). This resulted in the Gluecks' "Social Prediction Tables" that gave predictions of the likelihood of juvenile delinquency based upon parameters from when the youths were six years old. In 1953, she became a research associate at a Harvard Law School Research Project that was investigating the causes, treatment and prevention of juvenile delinquency.

In 1947, the United Prison Association of Massachusetts awarded her its Parsons Memorial Award. Although Glueck never received a tenured appointment with the faculty, both Eleanor and Sheldon Glueck were awarded honorary Sc.D. from Harvard in 1958. She was elected a Fellow of the American Academy of Arts and Sciences in 1960. In 1969, Glueck was awarded a Distinguished Alumni Award from Barnard College. She was a trustee at the Judge Baker Guidance Center. She became a fellow with the International Society of Criminologists and the American Association for the Advancement of Science. The couple retired during the 1960s. Glueck accidentally drowned in a bathtub at her home in Cambridge, Massachusetts, at the age of 74.
