= Edgar Gluck =

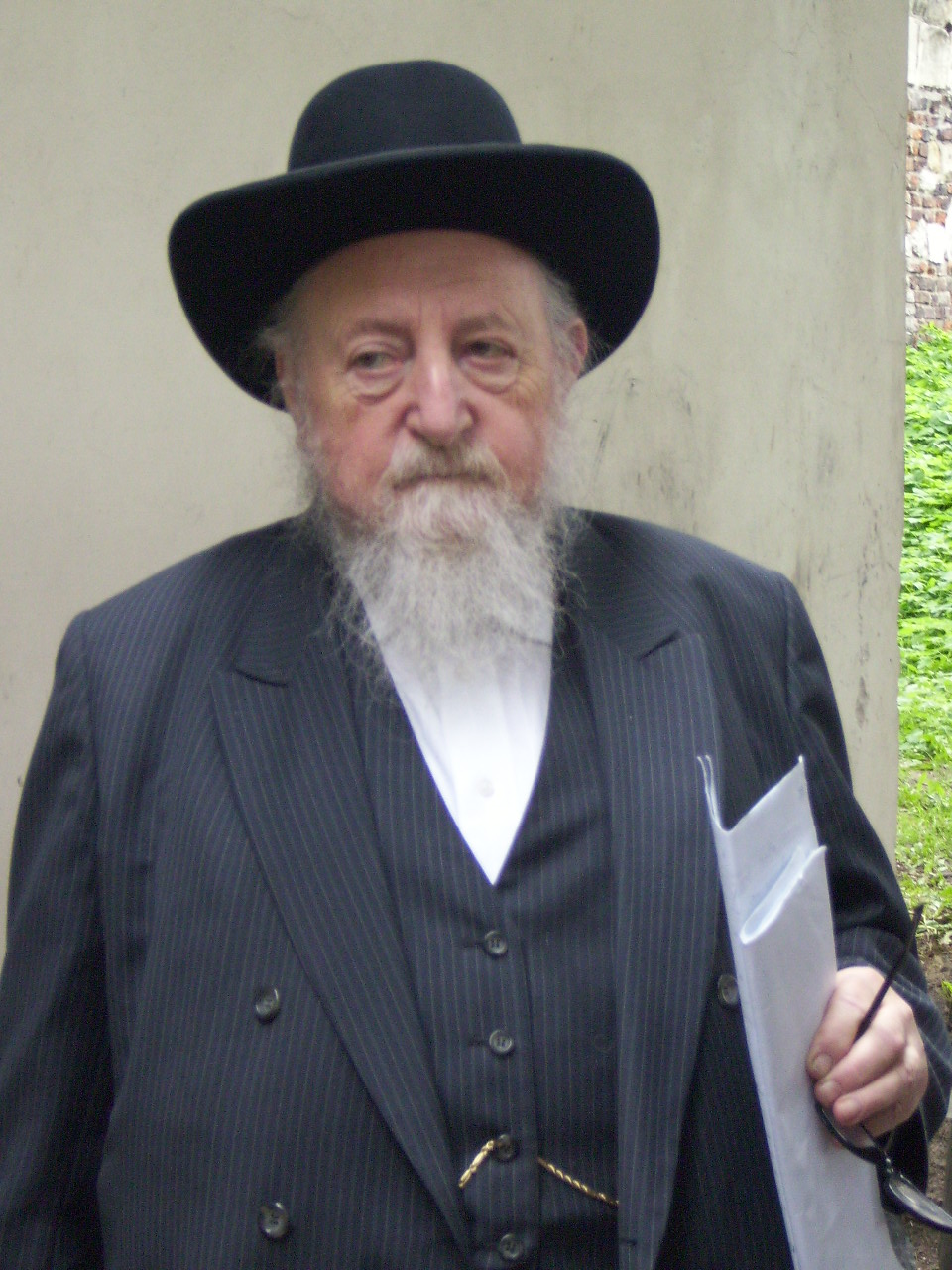
Edgar Glück

Edgar Chaim Baruch Gluck (Glück) (born 14 June 1936, Hamburg, Germany) is currently the Chief Rabbi of Galicia. Subsumed into countries now part of Central and Eastern Europe, Galicia ceased to exist as a political entity, however Chasidim still refer to themselves as Galicianas.in 1921; the title of its Chief Rabbi had already been abolished by royal decree on 1 November 1786 as part of the Josephinism Reforms. which makes Rabbi Gluck the first Chief Rabbi of Galicia since those times.

Rabbi Gluck graduated from Chasam Sofer Rabbinical College (B.A., 1957) and Long Island University (M.A., 1974). Gluck was first appointed to the U.S. Commission for the Preservation of America's Heritage Abroad in June 1987 and reappointed in March 1998 at the recommendation of the Speaker of the House of Representatives; his term expired in June 2001.

Gluck completed his post Rabbinical studies at Beth Medrash Elyon.
