= Robert Gluck =

Writer, educator, rabbi, pianist and composer

Robert J. Gluck
- Born: 1955 (age 70–71)
- Education: University at Albany; Yeshiva University; Reconstructionist Rabbinical College; Rensselaer Polytechnic Institute
- Occupations: writer, educator, rabbi, pianist and composer
- Website: bobgluck.com

Robert Gluck (born 1955) is a writer, educator, rabbi, pianist and composer whose repertoire spans jazz, live electronic music, and avant-garde music. Bob Gluck is currently an Associate Professor for the Department of Music at The University at Albany.

== Early life ==
Raised in New York as a conservatory student and political activist, Gluck spent many years away from music, leading a life as a rabbi. Gluck's musical training is from the Juilliard School, Manhattan School of Music, and Crane School of Music. He holds degrees from the University at Albany, Yeshiva University's Wurzweiler School of Social Work, Reconstructionist Rabbinical College (MHL, title of Rabbi) and Rensselaer Polytechnic Institute (MFA).

== Music career ==
Bob Gluck's return to composing electronic music in 1995 and to the piano in 2005 marked a new beginning in his unusual career. With influences as diverse as Herbie Hancock, Jimi Hendrix, Johann Sebastian Bach, Ornette Coleman, John Coltrane, and Karlheinz Stockhausen, Gluck has discovered a way to marry interests in electronic music with his love of jazz. Gluck designs his own software interfaces for interactive musical performance and multimedia installation, including the sound installations 'Layered Histories' (2004), an immersive sound and video environment with Cynthia Rubin and 'Sounds of a Community' (2002), in which visitors trigger and shape recorded sounds by interacting with electronic musical sculptures.

His music has been performed internationally. Karl Ackermann (All About Jazz) has written: “As a composer and player, Gluck ranks with the likes of Andrew Hill and Cecil Taylor… Something Quiet is completely original, artistically spontaneous, and intellectually challenging.” Allan Kozinn (New York Times) wrote that Gluck is "an accomplished jazz pianist" who played with "virtuosic fluidity." Keyboard magazine named him June 2009 “Unsigned Artist of the Month.” Gluck's musical collaborators have included reed players Kinan Azmeh, Andrew Sterman, Joe Giardullo and Ras Moshe; bassists Christopher Dean Sullivan, Ken Filiano, and Michael Bisio; drummers Tani Tabbal, Billy Hart, Karl Latham, and Dean Sharp; computer musician/composer Neil Rolnick; and digital visual artist Cynthia Beth Rubin.

== Published works ==
Bob Gluck is perhaps best known for his in-depth jazz writing. His essays have appeared in Computer Music Journal, eContact!, Leonardo Music Journal, Leonardo, Organized Sound, Tav +, Journal SEAMUS, Review Zaman (France), Magham (Iran), Ideas Sonicas (Mexico), and elsewhere.

Books and recordings:

- Stories Heard and Retold (1998)
- Electric Songs (2001)
- Electric Brew (2007)
- Sideways (2008)
- Something Quiet (2011)
- Extended Family (Neil Rolnick, 2011)
- Returning (2011)
- You’ll Know When You’ll Get There: Herbie Hancock and the Mwandishi Band (University of Chicago Press, 2012)
- Textures and Pulsations (with Aruan Ortiz, 2012)
- Tropelets (with Andrew Sterman, 2013)
- The Miles Davis Lost Quintet and Other Revolutionary Ensembles (University of Chicago Press, 2016)
- Infinite Spirit: Revisiting Music of the Mwandishi Band (2016)
- At this Time (with Tani Tabbal, 2017)
- Early Morning Star (2020)
- Miles Davis, Il Quintetto perduto e altre rivoluzioni (Miles Davis, the Lost Quintet and other revolutions) (Quodlibet Chorus, revised Italian edition, 2020)
