= Sheldon Glueck =

Polish-American criminologist

- Born: August 15, 1896; Warsaw, Poland
- Died: March 10, 1980 (aged 83); Cambridge, Massachusetts, U.S.
- Occupation: criminologist

Sheldon Glueck (August 15, 1896 – March 10, 1980) was a Polish-American criminologist. He and his wife Eleanor Glueck collaborated extensively on research related to juvenile delinquency and developed the "Social Prediction Tables" model for predicting the likelihood of delinquent behavior in youth. They were the first criminologists to perform studies of chronic juvenile offenders and among the first to examine the effects of psychopathy among the more serious delinquents.

== Early life ==
Born in Warsaw, Poland during the Russian Empire, he became a naturalized citizen of the United States in 1920. He received his PhD from Harvard University in 1924 and taught there from 1925 to 1963.

== Career ==
Glueck's brother Bernard Glueck, Sr. introduced him to his future wife Eleanor, then employed by Bernard. Eleanor and Sheldon Glueck embarked upon an internationally recognized partnership in criminology that would last the remainder of their lives. Their landmark studies of inmates at the Massachusetts Reformatory examined the efficacy of the penal system and recidivism rates. In their controversial 1950 work Unraveling Juvenile Delinquency the two claimed that potential deviants could be identified by as young as six years of age. They would collaborate on more than 250 publications, beginning with Five Hundred Criminal Careers (1930), followed by Five Hundred Delinquent Women (1934) and One Thousand Juvenile Delinquents (1934). For the juvenile delinquents, they made attempts to predict criminality using statistics, followed by the likelihood of their rehabilitation upon release. They were the first criminologists to perform studies of chronic juvenile offenders and among the first to examine the effects of psychopathy among the more serious delinquents. Their studies showed that psychopathy was 20 times more common among juvenile delinquents. In 1940, they began a ten-year longitudinal study that was published as Unraveling Juvenile Delinquency (1950). This resulted in the Gluecks' "Social Prediction Tables" that gave predictions of the likelihood of juvenile delinquency based upon parameters from when the youths were six years old.

During the aftermath of the Holocaust he was one of the leading advocates for the creation of an international criminal court to punish crimes against humanity.

== Death ==
Glueck died in Cambridge, Massachusetts.

== Literary works ==
- 500 Criminal Careers (1930)
- War Criminals: Their Prosecution and Punishment (1944)
- Unraveling Juvenile Delinquency (1950)
- Identification of Predelinquents (1972)
