= Christian Friedrich von Glück =

German jurist (1755–1831)

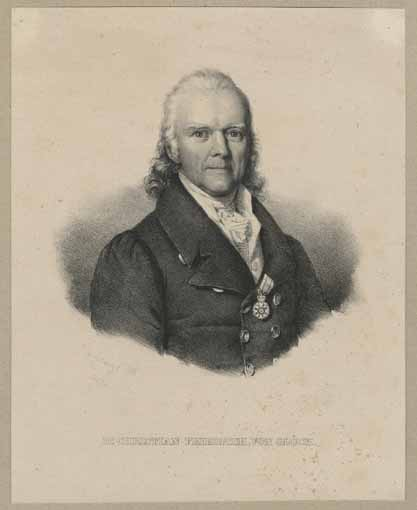
- Born: 1 July 1755; Halle, Duchy of Magdeburg, Kingdom of Prussia
- Died: 20 January 1831 (aged 75); Erlangen, Kingdom of Bavaria

Christian Friedrich von Glück (1 July 1755 – 20 January 1831) was a German jurist.

Born at Halle in the Duchy of Magdeburg on 1 July 1755, he studied from 1770 to 1776 at the University of Halle and on the 16 April 1777 he received a Doctor of Law for his dissertation De vita petendae restitutionis in integrum praetoriae secundum doctrinam romanorum praecipue quadriennali hodie vero perpetua. After seven years as a Privatdozent in 1784 he decided to go to Erlangen and became a professor of law at the Friedrich-Alexander-University. In 1785 he married Wilhelmine Elisabeth Geiger. From the marriage he had two sons, Christian Karl von Glück (1791–1867) and Christian Wilhelm von Glück (1810–1866), and a daughter. Christian Friedrich von Glück died on 20 January 1831 in Erlangen.

== Works ==
Among his writings must be especially mentioned Ausführliche Erläuterung der Pandekten (Erlangen 1790–1830, 34 volumes).

== Bibliography ==
- Hirata, Alessandro (2006). "Die Vollendung des usus modernus pandectarum: Christian Friedrich von Glück (1755-1831)". Zeitschrift der Savigny-Stiftung für Rechtsgeschichte: Romanistische Abteilung (in German). 123: 330–343. doi:10.7767/zrgra.2006.123.1.330. S2CID 178227799.
- Hamza, Gabor (2009). Entstehung und Entwicklung der modernen Privatrechtsordnungen und die römischrechtliche Tradition (in German). Budapest. pp. 186–188. ISBN 978963284095-6.
- von Stintzing, Roderich (1879). "Glück, Christian Friedrich von" . Allgemeine Deutsche Biographie (in German). Vol. 9. Leipzig: Duncker & Humblot. pp. 253–256..
