= Glack =

Hamlet and townland in Northern Ireland

- hamlet, townland
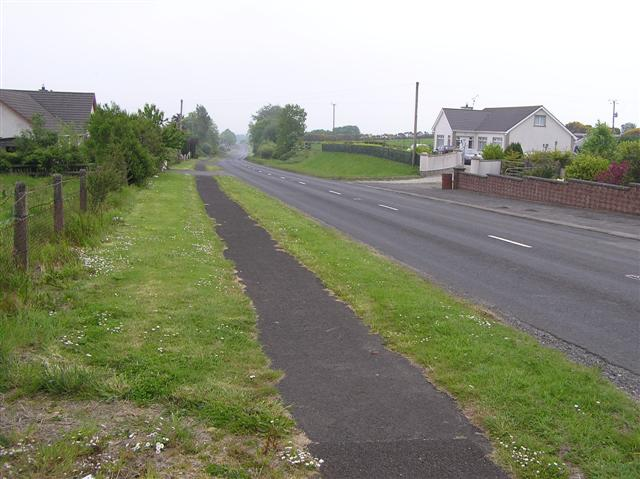
- Barnailt Road

- Location within the United Kingdom
- Coordinates: 54°59′35″N 7°02′28″W

Glack (from Irish Glaic, meaning 'hollow'), is a hamlet and townland in County Londonderry, Northern Ireland. It is 4 km south of Ballykelly, in a raised spot overlooking Lough Foyle. In the 2001 Census it had a population of 183 people. It is situated within Causeway Coast and Glens district.

Glack is made up of three clusters of buildings. It has a primary school (St Finlough's, in neighbouring Sistrakeel townland) and a business called Paragon Health Ltd.

It has a Gaelic club called Glack GAC, a Community Association and numerous other clubs to include camogie, bowling and knitting clubs.

== Sport ==
- Glack has its own bowling team called St Finlough's.
- Glack GAC is the local Gaelic Athletic Association club
