= WKIX =

WKIX may refer to:

- WKIX-FM, a radio station (102.9 FM) licensed to Raleigh, North Carolina, United States
- WKIX (AM), a radio station (850 AM) licensed to Raleigh, North Carolina, United States
- WKJO (FM), a radio station (102.3 FM) licensed to Smithfield, North Carolina, United States, which formerly used the call signs WKIX-FM and WKIX
- WZKT, a radio station (97.7 FM) licensed to Walnut Creek, North Carolina, United States, which used the call sign WKIX from 2006 until 2008
- WPLW-FM, a radio station (96.9 FM) licensed to Goldsboro, North Carolina, United States, which used the call sign WKIX from 1998 until 2001
- WBBB, a radio station (96.1 FM) licensed to Raleigh, North Carolina, United States, which formerly used the call sign WKIX-FM
- WISW, a radio station (1320 AM) licensed to Columbia, South Carolina, United States, which used the call sign WKIX from 1945 until 1947
