= McClatchey Broadcasting =

McClatchy Broadcasting
- Type: Private
- Industry: Broadcasting
- Headquarters: Raleigh, North Carolina, United States,
- Key people: Bill McClatchey
- Products: Radio stations
- Website: ncsportsradio.com

McClatchey Broadcasting is a privately owned company based in Raleigh, North Carolina, United States, that owns radio stations in North Carolina. The company is owned by Bill McClatchey. He is the son-in-law of Don Curtis, who owns the Curtis Media Group, which owns a number of radio stations in the Triangle area.

In its home market, it owns country station WQDR-FM, rock station WBBB, and operates the Triangle Traffic Network in Raleigh. The Headquarters of Triangle Traffic Network (TTN) is at Curtis Media Group’s offices at 3012 Highwoods Blvd., Suite 200, Raleigh, NC.

McClatchey Broadcasting also has an interest in WYMY, a Spanish-language station licensed to Burlington, NC, serving the Greensboro market.
