= WPLW =

WPLW may refer to:

- WPLW-FM, a radio station (96.9 FM) licensed to serve Goldsboro, North Carolina, United States
- WKXU (FM), a radio station (102.5 FM) licensed to serve Hillsborough, North Carolina, that held the call signs WPLW or WPLW-FM from 2010 to 2023
- WQDR (AM), a radio station (570 AM) licensed to serve Raleigh, North Carolina, that held the call sign WPLW from 2019 to 2021
