= WFMC =

- Goldsboro, North Carolina; United States
- Frequency: 730 kHz
- Branding: 730 & 105.7 La Ley

Programming
- Language: Spanish
- Format: Contemporary hit radio

Ownership
- Owner: Curtis Media Group; (New Age Communications, Ltd.)
- Sister stations: WELS-FM; WWMC; WGBR; WSSG; WZKT

History
- First air date: November 11, 1951

Technical information
- Licensing authority: FCC
- Facility ID: 70622
- Class: D
- Power: 1,000 watts (day); 94 watts (night)
- Transmitter coordinates: 35°22′25″N 78°00′41″W
- Translator: (105.7 MHz) W289CG (Goldsboro)

Links
- Public license information: Public file; LMS
- Website: www.laleync.com

WFMC (730 kHz) is a Spanish CHR radio station licensed to Goldsboro, North Carolina, United States. The station is currently owned by New Age Communications, Inc.

WFMC was launched on November 11, 1951.

In 2025, WFMC changed from Gospel 730 to a simulcast of WYMY.
