= WEQR =

WEQR may refer to:

- WPLW-FM, a radio station (96.9 FM) licensed to Goldsboro, North Carolina that used the call sign WEQR from 1950 to 1989
- WKJO (FM), a radio station (102.3 FM) licensed to Smithfield, North Carolina that used the call sign WEQR from 1991 to 2001
- WZKT, a radio station (97.7 FM) licensed to Walnut Creek, North Carolina that used the call sign WEQR from 2008 to 2014
