= WFNL =

WFNL may refer to:

- Western Football Netball League, Australian sports league
- WQDR (AM), a radio station (570 AM) licensed to serve Raleigh, North Carolina, which held the call sign WFNL from 2012 to 2017
- WKJO (FM), a radio station (102.3 FM) licensed to serve Smithfield, North Carolina, which held the call sign WFNL-FM from 2014 to 2015
