= WGBR =

- Goldsboro, North Carolina; United States
- Frequency: 1150 kHz
- Branding: 1150 AM 98.3 FM WGBR

Programming
- Format: Classic hits

Ownership
- Owner: Curtis Media Group; (New Age Communications, Ltd.)
- Sister stations: WELS-FM, WFMC, WPLW-FM, WSSG, WWMC, WZKT

History
- First air date: August 14, 1939
- Former frequencies: 1370 kHz (1939–1941); 1400 kHz (1941-1950s)
- Call sign meaning: Randomly assigned

Technical information
- Licensing authority: FCC
- Facility ID: 48370
- Class: B
- Power: 5,000 watts day; 800 watts night
- Transmitter coordinates: 35°22′26.00″N 78°0′42.00″W
- Translator: 98.3 W252CL (Goldsboro)

Links
- Public license information: Public file; LMS
- Website: www.curtismedia.net/wgbr/

WGBR (1150 kHz) is a radio station licensed to Goldsboro, North Carolina, United States. The station is owned by New Age Communications, Ltd.

WGBR's format is classic hits.

== History ==
WGBR went on the air in August 14, 1939 as a 250-watt AM radio station in Goldsboro, North Carolina, broadcasting on 1370 AM, one of a few radio stations in eastern North Carolina. The frequency changed to 1400 AM in 1941 and to its current frequency of 1150 AM in the 1950s. Its last move increased the power to 5,000 watts daytime.

Johnny Grant began his career at WGBR when it signed on. Carl Kassell worked as a DJ there on two separate stints in the 1950s, before eventually moving to Washington, DC to focus on news reporting and a lengthy career with NPR. Johnny Hood and Frank Taylor were DJs at WGBR before becoming DJs at North Carolina's 50,000-watt flagship station, WPTF in Raleigh. Vassie Balkcum, a voice associated many years with WGBR, was inducted into the North Carolina Association of Broadcasters in 2004. Curtis Media Group purchased WGBR in 1989 alongside sister station WEQR-FM.

Prior to 2015, WGBR operated a translator at 98.3 FM that simulcast the news-talk format before switching to the Jack FM format on WSSG. 98.3 went back to WGBR when WSSG operated its on translator on 92.7 a year later.

On June 12, 2017 WGBR changed their format from news/talk to classic hits, closely resembling sister station WELS-FM in Kinston.
