= WKXU =

WKXU may refer to:

- WKXU (FM), a radio station (102.5 FM) licensed to Hillsborough, North Carolina
- WYMY, a radio station (101.1 FM) licensed to Burlington, North Carolina, that used the call sign WKXU from 1998 to 2004
