= WQDR =

WQDR may refer to:

- WQDR (AM), a radio station (570 AM) licensed to Raleigh, North Carolina
- WQDR-FM, a radio station (94.7 FM) licensed to Raleigh, North Carolina, United States
