= WDOX =

WDOX may refer to:

- WDOX-LD, a low-power television station (channel 29, virtual 32) licensed to serve Palm Beach, Florida, United States
- WQDR (AM), a radio station (570 AM) licensed to serve Raleigh, North Carolina, United States, which held the call sign WDOX from 2006 to 2010
