= WDNZ =

WDNZ may refer to:

- WDNZ-LD, a low-power television station (channel 11) licensed to serve Glasgow, Kentucky, United States
- WQDR (AM), a radio station (570 AM) licensed to serve Raleigh, North Carolina, United States, which held the call sign WDNZ from 2003 to 2006
