= WYRN =

- Louisburg, North Carolina; United States
- Frequency: 1480 kHz

Programming
- Format: Urban gospel; urban oldies

Ownership
- Owner: Sadie Diana Alston; (A and D Broadcasting, Inc.)

History
- First air date: September 12, 1958

Technical information
- Licensing authority: FCC
- Facility ID: 22312
- Class: D
- Power: 500 watts day; 35 watts night
- Transmitter coordinates: 36°6′55.4″N 78°16′40.7″W
- Translator: 106.9 W295DK (Louisburg)

Links
- Public license information: Public file; LMS
- Webcast: Listen live

WYRN (1480 AM) is a radio station broadcasting an urban gospel/urban oldies format. The station is licensed to Louisburg, North Carolina, United States. WYRN is owned by Sadie Diana Alston, through licensee A and D Broadcasting, Inc.

== History ==
WYRN signed on September 12, 1958. At one time, WYRN aired the same programming as WKXU, which was previously WHLQ. Curtis Media Group purchased WHLQ and WYRN from Franklin Broadcasting in 2003.

== Translator ==
Call sign	Frequency	City of license	FID	ERP (W)	Class	Transmitter coordinates	FCC info
W295DK	106.9 FM	Louisburg, North Carolina	201599	140	D	36°6′46.5″N 78°16′49″W	LMS
