= WLUS-FM =

- Clarksville, Virginia; United States
- Broadcast area: Southside Virginia
- Frequency: 98.3 MHz
- Branding: US 98.3

Programming
- Format: Country
- Affiliations: Fox News Radio

Ownership
- Owner: Birch Broadcasting Corporation; (Lakes Media, LLC)
- Sister stations: WHLF, WKSK-FM, WMPW, WSHV, WWDN

History
- First air date: 1984
- Call sign meaning: United States

Technical information
- Licensing authority: FCC
- Facility ID: 11723
- Class: C3
- Power: 17,500 watts
- HAAT: 119 meters (390 ft)
- Transmitter coordinates: 36°29′45.0″N 78°33′16.0″W

Links
- Public license information: Public file; LMS
- Webcast: Listen live
- Website: us983.com

WLUS-FM (98.3 FM) is a Country formatted radio station licensed to Clarksville, Virginia, serving the Southside Virginia area. WLUS-FM is owned and operated by Thomas Birch's Birch Broadcasting Corporation, through licensee Lakes Media, LLC.

In August 2016, Lakes Media sent an informal objection to the Federal Communications Commission alleging that translator W252DK in Durham, North Carolina was interfering with reception of WLUS-FM. After nearly a year of debate between Arohi Media, licensee of W252DK, and Lakes Media, the FCC sent a letter requiring that the translator cease operation immediately. The translator's license has been suspended and is no longer found in the FCC database. The FCC had accepted a Petition for Reconsideration filed by Arohi Media on June 1, 2017.

WLUS would experience interference issues again with another translator station in 2024, this time coming from First State Communications, which owned W252EL in Cary, North Carolina and rebroadcast WQDR-AM. The move was made when numerous translators where reshuffled in a swap with WPTF in August of that year. However, WLUS complained that W252EL was causing interference to its southern coverage area. W252EL would eventually suspend operations on April 11, 2025, while First State Communications would attempt to amend its permit to reduce its power from 150 to 6 watts.
