= WZDV =

WZDV may refer to:

- WZDV (FM), a radio station (92.1 FM) licensed to serve Amherst, New York, United States
- WMPW, a radio station (970 AM) licensed to serve Danville, Virginia, United States, which held the call sign WZDV in 2015
