= WKJO =

WKJO may refer to:

- WKJO (FM), a radio station (102.3 FM) licensed to serve Smithfield, North Carolina, United States
- WKJO-LP, a defunct radio station (102.7 FM) formerly licensed to serve Brooksville, Florida, United States
