= WXIT =

- Blowing Rock, North Carolina; United States
- Frequency: 1200 kHz
- Branding: 95.3 and 107.5 The Pulse

Programming
- Format: Contemporary hit radio

Ownership
- Owner: Curtis Media Group
- Sister stations: WWMY; WZJS; WATA; WECR; WMMY

History
- First air date: 1983; 43 years ago
- Former call signs: WOIX (1982–1986); WXLX (1986–1989); WVIO (1989–1996)
- Former frequencies: 1510 kHz

Technical information
- Licensing authority: FCC
- Facility ID: 64274
- Class: D
- Power: 4,200 watts (day); 7,000 watts (critical hours)
- Transmitter coordinates: 36°9′17.00″N 81°39′41.00″W
- Translators: 95.3 W237EG (Boone); 107.5 W298CL (Beech Mountain)

Links
- Public license information: Public file; LMS
- Webcast: Listen live
- Website: Official website

WXIT (1200 AM) is a radio station that broadcasts in a contemporary hit radio format. Licensed to Blowing Rock, North Carolina, the station is currently owned by High Country Ventures, LLC.

WXIT has been granted an FCC construction permit to move to a new transmitter site, decrease day power to 4,200 watts and discontinue critical hours service.

== History ==
After buying WJTP in 1996, and changing its letters to WECR, Steve Rondinaro's Rondinaro Broadcasting started WECR-FM (now WWMY) and added WXIT.

Aisling purchased these stations, as well as WATA and WZJS, which were owned by Highland Communication Associates. Aisling went into receivership in early 2008. George Reed of Media Services Group was appointed to manage the stations until a buyer was found.

Former logo

On August 20, 2016, WXIT changed their format from news/talk to top 40/CHR, branded as "Pulse Boone", and is one of only a few stations across the country carrying current hits on an AM signal.
