= WZJS =

- Banner Elk, North Carolina; United States
- Broadcast area: Boone, North Carolina
- Frequency: 100.7 MHz
- Branding: Classic Hits 100.7 & 99.1

Programming
- Format: Classic hits

Ownership
- Owner: Curtis Media Group
- Sister stations: WWMY, WMMY, WATA, WECR, WXIT

History
- First air date: August 5, 1989

Technical information
- Licensing authority: FCC
- Facility ID: 60647
- Class: A
- ERP: 150 watts
- HAAT: 593 meters (1,946 ft)
- Transmitter coordinates: 36°10′34″N 81°50′05″W
- Translator: 99.1 W256CV (Boone)

Links
- Public license information: Public file; LMS
- Webcast: Listen Live
- Website: WZJS Online

WZJS (100.7 FM) is a radio station broadcasting a classic hits format. Licensed to Banner Elk, North Carolina, United States, it serves the Banner Elk area. The station is currently owned by Curtis Media Group.

== History ==
WZJS was started in 1989 by Roland Potter. In the late 1990s the station, along with WATA, was sold to Highland Communication Associates. The station from then to its sale was known as "High Country 100.7" and was one of the most popular radio stations in Northwestern NC. Both stations broadcast from a building on Blowing Rock Road in Boone, adjacent to the Appalachian State University campus, with a transmitter located near Banner Elk.

In September 2003 Highland sold both stations to Aisling Broadcasting (Jonathon Hoffman, managing member) for a price of $2.2 million, This added to Aisling's holdings in the High Country, as they had already purchased WECR, WECR-FM, WXIT (from Rondinaro Broadcasting) for $2.2 million in 2003, and WMMY(from Dale Hendrix) in 2004 for $1.58 million. The station then switched to a Contemporary Christian format, while WMMY became the area's new country station under the moniker, "My Country 106". Later WZJS switched to classic rock as "100.7 Mac FM", with the slogan "Classic Rock for the High Country".

Aisling went into receivership and George Reed of Media Services Group was appointed to manage the stations until a buyer was found. Later in the year, Curtis Media Group purchased the stations.

On January 1, 2010 WZJS changed their format to oldies, branded as "Oldies 100.7".

On February 24, 2013 WZJS shifted their format from oldies to classic hits, branded as "Classic Hits 100.7".

Logo before 99.1 translator sign on
