= WWMY =

- Beech Mountain, North Carolina; United States
- Frequency: 102.3 MHz
- Branding: Highway 106.1 & 102.3

Programming
- Format: Country (WMMY simulcast)
- Affiliations: Motor Racing Network; Performance Racing Network; Westwood One

Ownership
- Owner: Curtis Media Group
- Sister stations: WMMY, WZJS, WATA, WECR, WXIT

History
- Former call signs: WAOH (1993); WECR (1993–1996); WECR-FM (1996–2014)
- Call sign meaning: Variation of sister station WMMY

Technical information
- Licensing authority: FCC
- Facility ID: 22224
- Class: A
- ERP: 1,500 watts
- HAAT: 596.6 meters
- Transmitter coordinates: 36°11′3.00″N 81°52′48.00″W

Links
- Public license information: Public file; LMS
- Webcast: Listen Live
- Website: WWMY Online

WWMY (102.3 FM) is a radio station broadcasting a country music format, simulcasting WMMY 106.1 FM Jefferson, North Carolina. Licensed to Beech Mountain, North Carolina, United States, the station is currently owned by Curtis Media Group and features programming from CBS News Radio.

== History ==
After buying WJTP in 1996, Steve Rondinaro's Rondinaro Broadcasting changed that station's Call sign to WECR and started WECR-FM, along with buying WXIT.

In 2003, the stations were sold to Aisling Broadcasting (Jonathon Hoffman, managing member) for $2.2 million.

This added to Aisling's holdings since they had also purchased in September 2003 (from Highland Communications) WATA & WZJS for a price of $2.2 million, and WMMY (from Dale Hendrix) in 2004 for $1.58 million.

Aisling went into receivership, and George Reed of Media Services Group was appointed to manage the stations until a buyer was found. Later in the year, Curtis Media Group purchased the stations.

On February 24, 2013, WECR-FM changed formats from adult contemporary Mix 102.3 to country, simulcasting WMMY 106.1 FM. On February 28, 2014, the station changed callsigns to the current WWMY.
