= WMMY =

- Jefferson, North Carolina; United States
- Broadcast area: Watauga, Avery, Ashe, Wilkes
- Frequency: 106.1 MHz
- Branding: Highway 106.1 & 102.3

Programming
- Format: Country music
- Affiliations: Motor Racing Network; Performance Racing Network; Westwood One

Ownership
- Owner: Curtis Media Group
- Sister stations: WWMY, WZJS, WATA, WECR, WXIT

History
- Call sign meaning: WM MY Country 106 (former branding)

Technical information
- Facility ID: 91
- Class: C3
- ERP: 10,500 watts
- HAAT: 155 meters
- Transmitter coordinates: 36°19′53″N 81°35′17″W
- Repeater: 102.3 WWMY (Beech Mountain)

Links
- Webcast: Listen Live
- Website: WMMY Online

WMMY (106.1 FM) is a radio station broadcasting a country music format. Licensed to Jefferson, North Carolina, United States, the station broadcasts from studios on Blowing Rock Road in Boone, North Carolina and serves the counties of Watauga, Ashe, Avery, Alleghany, Wilkes, Catawba and Caldwell in northwestern North Carolina. The station is currently owned by Curtis Media Group.

== History ==
Highland Communication Associates bought WATA from the Roland Potter family in the late 1980s and started WZJS. Aisling bought these stations in 2003; the same time as the company also purchased WECR, WECR-FM and WXIT. It was then that WZJS switched from a Country Music format to Contemporary Christian, thus allowing for WMMY to become the High Country's new FM country radio station. The station started out using the moniker, "My Country 106", but after several years, switched to using "Highway 106". Aisling went into receivership and George Reed of Media Services Group was appointed to manage the stations until a buyer was found. Later in the year, Curtis Media Group purchased the station. On February 24, 2013, sister station WECR-FM (now WWMY) began simulcasting WMMY, and the branding of the two stations was modified to "Highway 106 & 102.3."
