= WATA =

- Boone, North Carolina; United States
- Frequency: 1450 kHz

Programming
- Format: Local News Talk Information
- Affiliations: IMG, North Carolina News Network, Westwood One

Ownership
- Owner: Curtis Media Group
- Sister stations: WWMY, WZJS, WMMY, WECR, WXIT

History
- First air date: February 2, 1951
- Call sign meaning: WATAuga County

Technical information
- Licensing authority: FCC
- Facility ID: 71068
- Class: C
- Power: 1,000 watts unlimited
- Transmitter coordinates: 36°12′59.00″N 81°42′6.00″W
- Translators: W243DH (96.5 MHz, Boone)

Links
- Public license information: Public file; LMS
- Website: http://GoBlueRidge.net

WATA (1450 AM) is a radio station broadcasting a Local News Talk Information format. Licensed to Boone, North Carolina, United States. The station is currently owned by Curtis Media Group of Raleigh, North Carolina and features predominantly locally produced programming, including Bill Fisher in the Morning, as well as Mike Kelly's Swap Shop, and many others.

== History ==
In September 2003 Highland sold WATA, (along with WZJS 100.7FM) to Aisling Broadcasting (Jonathon Hoffman, managing member) for a price of $2.2 million. This added to Aisling's holdings in the High Country, as they had already purchased WECR, WECR-FM, WXIT (from Rondinaro Broadcasting) for $2.2 million in 2003, and WMMY (from Dale Hendrix) in 2004 for $1.58 million.

Aisling went into receivership and George Reed of Media Services Group was appointed to manage the stations until a buyer is found. Later in the year, Curtis Media Group purchased the stations.
