= WECR =

- Newland, North Carolina; United States
- Frequency: 1130 kHz
- Branding: Star 94.3

Programming
- Format: Adult contemporary
- Affiliations: Compass Media Networks

Ownership
- Owner: Curtis Media Group; (High Country Adventures, LLC)
- Sister stations: WWMY; WZJS; WATA; WMMY; WXIT

History
- First air date: August 14, 1978; 47 years ago
- Last air date: June 2024; 1 year ago
- Former call signs: WJTP (1978–1996)
- Call sign meaning: We care about the high country

Technical information
- Licensing authority: FCC
- Facility ID: 29515
- Class: D
- Power: 1,000 watts (day)
- Transmitter coordinates: 36°4′39.5″N 81°54′58.4″W
- Translator: 94.3 W232CW (Boone)

Links
- Public license information: Public file; LMS
- Webcast: Listen live
- Website: www.goblueridge.net/index.php/live/star

WECR (1130 AM) was a radio station broadcasting an adult contemporary music format. Licensed to Newland, North Carolina, United States, it served the Boone, North Carolina, area. The station was owned by Curtis Media Group, through licensee High Country Adventures, LLC.

WECR transmitted with 1,000 watts by day, using a non-directional antenna. Because 1130 kHz is a clear channel frequency reserved for Class A station WBBR in New York City, WECR was required to sign-off at night to avoid interference.

== History ==
James T. Parker owned what was then called WJTP.

Steve Rondinaro's Rondinaro Broadcasting purchased WJTP in 1996 and changed the letters to WECR. Rondinaro also started WECR-FM and added WXIT. Aisling bought these stations from Rondinaro as well as WATA and WZJS, owned by Highland Communications. Aisling went into receivership and George Reed of Media Services Group was appointed to manage the stations until a buyer was found. Later in the year, Curtis Media Group purchased the stations.

On January 10, 2022, WECR changed formats from southern gospel to adult contemporary, branded as "Star 94.3" in reflection of its simulcast on FM translator W232CW (94.3) in Boone.

WECR went silent in June 2024 after losing its transmitter site lease. The Federal Communications Commission cancelled the station's license on July 21, 2025.
