= WKSK-FM =

- South Hill, Virginia; United States
- Broadcast area: South Hill, Virginia; Lawrenceville, Virginia; Victoria, Virginia
- Frequency: 101.9 MHz
- Branding: Rewind 101.9

Programming
- Format: Classic hits
- Affiliations: Fox News Radio

Ownership
- Owner: Birch Broadcasting Corporation; (Lakes Media, LLC)
- Sister stations: WHLF, WLUS-FM, WMPW, WSHV, WWDN

History
- First air date: December 23, 1966
- Former call signs: WJWS-FM (1966–1973); WSHV (1973–2001); WSHV-FM (2001); WKSK-FM (2001–2005); WRWV (2005)
- Former frequencies: 105.5 MHz (1966–1997); 98.9 MHz (1997–2004)
- Call sign meaning: "Kiss Country" (former branding)

Technical information
- Licensing authority: FCC
- Facility ID: 50234
- Class: A
- ERP: 6,000 watts (horizontal); 5,700 watts (vertical)
- HAAT: 96 meters (315 ft)
- Transmitter coordinates: 36°44′39.5″N 78°9′41″W

Links
- Public license information: Public file; LMS
- Website: www.rewind1019.com

WKSK-FM (101.9 MHz) is a classic hits formatted broadcast radio station licensed to South Hill, Virginia, serving South Hill, Lawrenceville and Victoria in Virginia. WKSK-FM is owned by Thomas Birch's Birch Broadcasting Corporation, through licensee Lakes Media, LLC.
