= WELS-FM =

- Kinston, North Carolina; United States
- Broadcast area: Wilson and Goldsboro
- Frequency: 102.9 MHz
- Branding: Beach, Boogie, & Blues Radio

Programming
- Format: Beach music

Ownership
- Owner: Curtis Media Group; (Eastern Airwaves, LLC)
- Sister stations: WWMC; WFMC; WGBR; WIKS; WMGV; WSFL-FM; WNCT; WMJV

History
- First air date: 1971

Technical information
- Facility ID: 20409
- Class: A
- ERP: 3,000 watts
- HAAT: 90 meters (300 ft)
- Transmitter coordinates: 35°17′3.5″N 77°39′51.9″W

Links
- Webcast: Listen live
- Website: www.beachboogieandblues.com; www.curtismedia.net/wels-fm/

WELS-FM (102.9 MHz), also known as Beach Boogie and Blues 102.9 is an American radio station licensed to serve the community of Kinston, North Carolina, United States. The station is owned by Curtis Media Group, via licensee Eastern Airwaves, LLC., and broadcasts a format consisting of rhythmic oldies and Carolina beach music, targeting eastern North Carolina.

The station's programming is also heard in nearby Greenville on full-signalled WNCT (1070 AM), in addition to FM translator signals in New Bern, Jacksonville and Winterville/Greenville.

WELS-FM also features news programming from North Carolina News Network.

== History ==
For many years, WELS-FM aired a gospel music format, simulcast with their AM sister station (1150 AM). On February 14, 2013, after an ownership change, the station changed to classic hits as "102.9 WELS". The AM station switched to a news/talk format.

On June 27, 2017, WELS-FM changed their format from classic hits to beach music, as Beach, Boogie and Blues, simulcasting WNCT (1070 AM) in Greenville.

== Translators ==
In addition to the two originating stations WELS and WNCT, Beach, Boogie and Blues is relayed by an additional three FM translators to expand its broadcast area. The translators are fed by WIKS-HD2.
