= WPCM =

- Burlington–Graham, North Carolina; United States
- Broadcast area: Greensboro metropolitan area; Raleigh-Durham-Cary, NC
- Frequency: 920 kHz
- Branding: Goat 104.5

Programming
- Format: Classic Hits

Ownership
- Owner: Chuck Marsh; (Triad Media Partners, Inc.)
- Sister stations: WMFR

History
- First air date: September 15, 1941; 85 years ago
- Former call signs: WBBB (1941–1998)
- Call sign meaning: "We Play Country Music" (former format)

Technical information
- Licensing authority: FCC
- Facility ID: 9082
- Class: D
- Power: 5,000 watts (day); 55 watts (night)
- Transmitter coordinates: 36°5′51.49″N 79°29′10.08″W
- Translator: 104.5 W283BT (Burlington)

Links
- Public license information: Public file; LMS
- Webcast: Listen live
- Website: www.facebook.com/profile.php?id=61573964518618

WPCM (920 kHz) is a commercial AM radio station broadcasting a Classic Hits radio format. Licensed to Burlington-Graham, North Carolina, the station covers the Greensboro metropolitan area and part of the Raleigh-Durham metropolitan area. It is owned by Chuck Marsh, through licensee Triad Media Partners, Inc., and calls itself "Goat 104.5." The studios and offices are on North Main Street in Kernersville, North Carolina.

By day, WPCM transmits 5,000 watts non-directional, but to avoid interference to other stations on 920 AM, at night it reduces power to only 55 watts. The transmitter is on Tower Drive at West Front Street in Burlington. Programming is also heard on FM translator 104.5 MHz W283BT in Burlington.

== History ==
The station signed on the air on September 15, 1941. It was the first radio station in the City of Burlington and the first in Alamance County. The original call sign was WBBB. WBBB had its studios above Lamb's Clothing on South Main Street. It was a daytime-only station with 1,000 watts of power but required to go off the air at sunset. Its transmitter was on Tower Drive at the same location the station airs from today.

In 1946, WBBB added an FM station at 101.3 (later 101.1). It later became a separate station known as WNCB, then WPCM and it is currently WYMY. In 1952, WBBB increased its power to 5,000 watts, remaining a daytimer.

The WBBB call sign moved to an FM station in Raleigh in January 1998. AM 920, which had taken on a news/talk format that included Ken Hamblin and G. Gordon Liddy, switched its call letters to WPCM. Although the area had several country radio stations, WPCM began playing classic country by artists such as Dolly Parton, George Jones, Willie Nelson and Patsy Cline. The new slogan was "We Don't Forget Who Made Country Music Great."

By 2001, WPCM was playing oldies. In June 2004, WPCM changed its format from beach music. On May 14, 2005, WPCM went back to its beach music format, including operations manager/morning host Byron Tucker and afternoon DJ Charlie Brown.

In 2009, Brown became an honorary member of the Association of Beach and Shag Club DeeJays' DJ Hall of Fame. In 2010, WPCM won the Carolina Beach Music Association's AM Station of the Year award for the third time in four years.

In 2014, WPCM added W236BO, an FM translator at 95.1 MHz which previously belonged to Liberty University. The music also changed but remained oldies.

On December 26, 2014, WPCM switched from oldies to country music. Imaging promos on the air said "WPCM. We Play Country Music." The station's Facebook page had this explanation: "...Today we begin an exciting new chapter in our life as a radio station as we bring you the best in country music...." and "...Alamance County has a love of country music and it is our responsibility to the community and to ourselves to play the music that you want to hear and that our advertiser's clients want to hear...."

In 2018, WPCM switched to an all sports format, simulcast from co-owned WSJS in Winston-Salem.

In January 2022, it was announced that Curtis Media Group would sell WPCM, WMFR, and its translator W283CV to Triad Media Partners. Curtis Media sold WSJS one month prior, meaning these stations were Curtis Media's last properties in the Piedmont Triad market. The sale was consummated on June 16, 2022.

On April 29, 2022, WPCM changed its format from sports to contemporary Christian, branded as "Hope 104.5".

On or about April 2, 2025, WPCM changed its format from Contemporary Christian to Classic Hits, branded as "GOAT 104.5" with the GOAT Morning show host Ernest Bare to debut April 14, 2025.

== Translator ==
Call sign	Frequency	City of license	FID	ERP (W)	Class	Transmitter coordinates	FCC info
W283BT	104.5 FM	Burlington, North Carolina	142582	190	D	36°5′51.5″N 79°29′10.1″W	LMS
