= Jerry Carroll (comedian) =

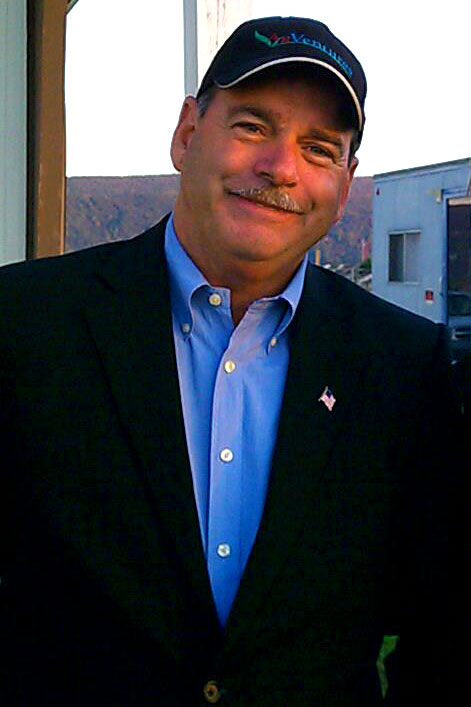
- Carroll in 2013
- Born: 1959 (age 66–67)
- Occupations: Stand-up comedian, speaker, farmer
- Website: agriculturespeaker.com

Jerry Carroll (born 1959) is an American comedian, speaker and farmer based in Raleigh, North Carolina. Also known as The Willow Spring Wildman, Carroll is best known for his role as co-host on television's "Amazing America with Sarah Palin".

Carroll started his career as a comedian in 1993 after working as a full-time farmer for several years. He has opened concerts for several music artists including Michael Bolton, Patty Loveless, Lyle Lovett, and Larry Gatlin.

== Early life ==
Carroll was raised on his family's farm in Willow Spring, a small town in Raleigh. Carroll helped his father and uncle on the farm since he was a child. When he was in high school, he performed on the stage for the first time as the lead role in Calamity Jane.

He performed as a stand up comedian for the first time at Charlie Goodnight's open mic night at the challenge of a friend in 1993. He won that night as well as the next four competitions. During his last year of full-time farming, in 1996, Carroll did 75 shows and grew nearly 1,500 acres of crops in partnership with his father and uncle. In 1997, he gave up his part of the partnership in the family farm.

He also presented a radio show called Wild Man Wednesday in the mid 1990s on WQDR-FM.

He owns a 100-acre soybean and oat farm and still works there. Carroll performs sixty to eighty shows a year for agricultural-related organizations. Carroll says he says he incorporates his experiences at the farm into his acts.

Carroll has frequently performed at events organized by Volvo Rents. In 2008, he performed at Volvo Rent's Hard Hat Comedy Show. The show generated one ton of food, which was donated to MANNA Food Bank. In 2009, he presented at Volvo Rents Texas Comedy Night in Bryan-College Station. The revenue from the show benefited Bryan-College Station Habitat for Humanity's 20th Anniversary Home.

Carroll was a speaker at the 2008 Governor's Agriculture Conference, and he performed at the Eight annual Farm News Agriculture Show,

In 2013, Carroll released Dirt in my DNA: Best of Jerry Carroll, Vol. 1, a collection of some of his routines.

Carroll produced and starred in a comedy TV show titled Fishing For Laughs which lasted 13 episodes. He is the current co-host for the Sportsman Channel series "Amazing America with Sarah Palin".
