= WHLF =

- South Boston, Virginia; United States
- Broadcast area: South Boston, Virginia; Halifax County, Virginia
- Frequency: 95.3 MHz
- Branding: 95.3 HLF

Programming
- Format: Adult contemporary
- Affiliations: Fox News Radio

Ownership
- Owner: Birch Broadcasting Corporation; (Lakes Media, LLC)
- Sister stations: WKSK-FM, WLUS-FM, WMPW, WSHV, WWDN

History
- First air date: September 1, 1992
- Former call signs: WYPA (1991–1992); WJLC (1992–1999); WHLF-FM (1999–2004)

Technical information
- Licensing authority: FCC
- Facility ID: 31178
- Class: A
- ERP: 6,000 watts
- HAAT: 75 meters (246 ft)
- Transmitter coordinates: 36°42′24.0″N 78°55′28.0″W

Links
- Public license information: Public file; LMS
- Webcast: Listen live
- Website: 953hlf.com

WHLF (95.3 FM) is an adult contemporary formatted radio station licensed to South Boston, Virginia, serving South Boston and Halifax County, Virginia. WHLF is owned by Birch Broadcasting Corporation, through licensee Lakes Media, LLC.
