= WWDN =

Radio station in Danville, Virginia

- Danville, Virginia; United States
- Broadcast area: Danville, Virginia; Yanceyville, North Carolina
- Frequency: 1580 kHz
- Branding: 104.5 The Dan

Programming
- Format: Classic hits

Ownership
- Owner: Lakes Media LLC
- Sister stations: WHLF, WKSK-FM, WLUS-FM, WMPW, WSHV

History
- First air date: 1957 (as WILA)
- Former call signs: WILA (1957–2009)
- Call sign meaning: WW DaN River

Technical information
- Licensing authority: FCC
- Facility ID: 67269
- Class: D
- Power: 1,000 watts daytime only
- Transmitter coordinates: 36°34′3.0″N 79°22′50.0″W
- Translator: 104.5 W283BN (Danville)

Links
- Public license information: Public file; LMS
- Website: WWDN Online

WWDN (1580 AM) is a classic hits broadcast radio station licensed to Danville, Virginia, serving Danville, Virginia and Yanceyville, North Carolina. WWDN is owned and operated by Lakes Media LLC.

== History ==
Neill McMillan (father of Neill McMillan Jr., aka Mojo Nixon), described as "a 'champion' of the black community," bought then–WILA in 1969 from Ralph Baron and George Lund, who were the first owners of the station to target African-American listeners. Despite graffiti and tire damage, McMillan was committed to the Civil Rights Movement and aired speeches by Martin Luther King Jr. both times the civil rights leader visited Danville. WILA's callsign was originally from a defunct radio station in Woodstock, Illinois which broadcast from 1948 until 1950. After McMillan's death in 1978, his wife Frances ran the station, later selling to Lawrence and Ella Toller's Tol-Tol Communications. Lawrence Toller managed WILA for 17 years, although he lived in Lynchburg.

The station's format was urban oldies/black gospel "Heart and Soul".

== Station sold ==
On August 19, 2009, WILA was sold to Birch Broadcasting Corporation for $150,000. Toller said, "It has been an outlet for the black community. They may not have that now and I’m sorry about that." The station added an FM translator and changed format to classic hits WWDN as "104-5 the Dan" on December 14, 2009, debuting with 10,000 songs in a row (commercial-free) by such artists as Fleetwood Mac, The Eagles, Elton John and Journey.

== Translator ==
In addition to the main station, WWDN is relayed by an FM translator to widen its broadcast area.

Call sign	Frequency	City of license	FID	ERP (W)	HAAT	Class	FCC info
W283BN	104.5 FM	Danville, Virginia	154767	250	56.6 m (186 ft)	D	LMS
