= WSHV =

- South Hill, Virginia; United States
- Broadcast area: South Hill, Virginia; Mecklenburg County, Virginia
- Frequency: 1370 kHz
- Branding: 96-7 WSHV

Programming
- Language: English
- Format: Urban adult contemporary
- Affiliations: Premiere Networks

Ownership
- Owner: Birch Broadcasting Corporation; (Lakes Media, LLC)
- Sister stations: WHLF; WLUS-FM; WKSK-FM; WMPW; WWDN

History
- First air date: November 1, 1953
- Former call signs: WJWS (1953–2001)
- Call sign meaning: South Hill, Virginia

Technical information
- Licensing authority: FCC
- Facility ID: 50235
- Class: D
- Power: 4,200 watts (day); 410 watts (night)
- Transmitter coordinates: 36°44′39.5″N 78°9′41″W
- Translator: 96.7 W244CP (South Hill)

Links
- Public license information: Public file; LMS
- Webcast: Listen live; Listen live (via iHeartRadio)
- Website: www.lakesmedianetwork.com/stations/wshv-fm/

WSHV is a AM radio urban adult contemporary station licensed to South Hill, Virginia, serving South Hill and Mecklenburg County, Virginia. WSHV is owned and operated by Thomas Birch's Birch Broadcasting Corporation, through licensee Lakes Media, LLC.

== Format flips ==
On August 3, 2013, WSHV and its translator W244CP 96.7 flipped to classic country as "Country Legends 96-7".

On June 1, 2015, WSHV changed its format to a contemporary Christian format, branded as "96-7 Shine FM".

On July 3, 2020, WSHV changed their format from contemporary Christian to urban adult contemporary.

== Translator ==
In addition to the main station, WSHV is relayed by an FM translator to widen its broadcast area.

Call sign	Frequency	City of license	FID	ERP (W)	HAAT	Class	FCC info
W244CP	96.7 FM	South Hill, Virginia	150108	250	90.9 m (298 ft)	D	LMS
