= Curtis Media Group =

US Broadcast company

- Industry: digital
- Founded: 1968
- Founder: Don Curtis
- Headquarters: Raleigh, North Carolina
- Area served: United States
- Services: broadcasting
- Website: curtismedia.com

Curtis Media Group is a broadcast media company based in Raleigh, North Carolina, United States. The company owns and operates several North Carolina radio stations and television networks.

== Broadcast stations ==
Curtis Media Group owns and operates the following stations:

=== Radio ===
==== AM ====
- WPTF 680 AM (Raleigh, North Carolina)
- WQDR 570 AM (Raleigh, North Carolina)
- WGBR 1150 AM (Goldsboro, North Carolina)
- WFMC 730 AM (Goldsboro, North Carolina)
- WKIX 850 AM (Raleigh, North Carolina)
- WXIT 1200 AM (Blowing Rock, North Carolina)
- WATA 1450 AM (Boone, North Carolina)
- WECR 1130 AM (Newland, North Carolina)
- WWMC 1010 AM (Kinston, North Carolina)
- WSSG 1300 AM (Goldsboro, North Carolina)
- WNCT 1070 AM (Greenville, North Carolina)

==== FM ====
- WQDR-FM 94.7 FM (Raleigh, North Carolina)
- WBBB 96.1 FM (Raleigh, North Carolina)
- WPLW-FM 96.9 FM (Goldsboro, North Carolina)
- WKJO 102.3 FM (Smithfield, North Carolina)
- WKXU 102.5 FM (Hillsborough, North Carolina)
- WKIX-FM 102.9 FM (Raleigh, North Carolina)
- WYMY 101.1 FM (Burlington, North Carolina)
- WZKT 97.7 (Walnut Creek, North Carolina)
- WMMY 106.1 FM (Jefferson, North Carolina)
- WWMY 102.3 FM (Beech Mountain, North Carolina)
- WZJS 100.7 FM (Banner Elk, North Carolina)
- WELS-FM 102.9 FM (Kinston, North Carolina)
- WMGV 103.3 FM (Newport, North Carolina)
- WMJV 99.5 FM (Grifton, North Carolina)
- WSFL-FM 106.5 FM (New Bern, North Carolina)
- WIKS 101.9 FM (New Bern, North Carolina)

==== Radio networks ====
North Carolina News Network, broadcast news service for 75 affiliate stations in North Carolina; Triangle Traffic Network, traffic reporting service in the Raleigh Durham Metro; Southern Farm Network, agriculture reporting service for North and South Carolina; Triad Sports Network, sports programming in the Greensboro, High Point, Winston-Salem market

==== Internet ====
- North Carolina News Network
- www.StateGovernmentRadio.com
- SFNtoday.com
- ACCsports.com

== History ==
The company was founded in 1968 by Don Curtis as a cable TV provider. CMG is the largest privately held broadcast company in North Carolina, and claims that WQDR-FM is the highest-billing radio station in the state. Don Curtis formed a company, Inner Banks Broadcasting, in partnership with eastern North Carolina broadcaster Henry Hinton, which in 2006 purchased WMFR from CBS Radio, and simulcasts talk WSJS and WSML.
