= WKIX (AM) =

Oldies radio station in Raleigh, North Carolina, United States

- Raleigh, North Carolina; United States
- Broadcast area: Raleigh–Durham; Research Triangle
- Frequency: 850 kHz
- Branding: Oldies 850

Programming
- Language: English
- Format: Oldies

Ownership
- Owner: Curtis Media Group; (AM 850, LLC)
- Sister stations: WBBB; WKIX-FM; WKJO; WKXU; WPLW-FM; WPTF; WQDR; WQDR-FM; WYMY

History
- First air date: March 21, 1948
- Former call signs: WNAO (1948–1955); WKIX (1955–1994); WYLT (1994–1995); WRBZ (1995–2010); WKIX (2010–2012); WPTK (2012–2021)

Technical information
- Licensing authority: FCC
- Facility ID: 888
- Class: D
- Power: 9,000 watts (day); 120 watts (night)
- Transmitter coordinates: 35°47′38.55″N 78°45′42.02″W
- Translator: 93.5 W228CZ (Cary)

Links
- Public license information: Public file; LMS
- Website: oldies850.com

WKIX (850 kHz) is an AM radio station with an oldies format, licensed to Raleigh, North Carolina. The station is owned by Curtis Media Group, and serves the Research Triangle area.

== History ==
=== Early years ===
WNAO signed on March 21, 1948, owned by The News & Observer newspaper. As of 1948, WNAO was an ABC radio affiliate. WNAO-FM was added in 1949. Sir Walter Television purchased the stations from the newspaper effective February 13, 1953. The Raleigh-Durham market's first TV station, WNAO-TV, channel 28, signed on in 1953, but went off the air in 1957. The AM (10,000 watts on 850 kHz) and FM (35,000 watts at 96.1 MHz) radio stations were sold to an independent broadcaster, Ted Oberfelter, who changed the call letters to WKIX and WKIX-FM to avoid the association with the newspaper.

=== WKIX, Channel 85 ===
In 1958, Hugh Holder, a former CBS announcer, along with three partners bought the radio stations. Holder changed the format from easy listening to top 40, serving the Raleigh-Durham-Chapel Hill market. Known as "WKIX, Channel 85", "The Giant of the South", and "The Mighty 850", the station was one of the most successful popular music outlets in the US from the late 1950s through the 1970s. It was home to many well-known personalities in North Carolina radio including Charlie Brown and Rick Dees. General manager Hal Vester designed the unique format based on his former experience with Top 40 stations in Asheville, Greensboro, Charlotte, Wilmington, and Washington, DC. Chief Engineer Larry Gardner (who later became CE of WCKY in Cincinnati) was responsible for many technical innovations that provided the distinctive WKIX sound.

Following the Holder years, WKIX and WKIX-FM were owned by Belk Broadcasting, Southern Broadcasting, and Mann Media. Previously, the FM signal had mostly duplicated WKIX's programming, getting a boost from the rising popularity of FM and also providing improved full-time coverage of the entire Raleigh-Durham market. As FM became more dominant, the WKIX-FM call sign was changed to WYYD, power was increased to 100,000 watts, and the station was programmed separately as easy-listening.

In the 1970s, the station had a strong news department, with such figures as John Tesh and Doug Limerick. The format was called "20/20" news, with a summary at 20 past the hour and a full newscast at 20 before the hour. This proved effective since most other stations had news at the top of the hour, bottom of the hour or at 55 past the hour.

=== Switch to country and other formats ===
WKIX changed format to country in the summer of 1981, featuring such personalities as Joe Wade Formicola (who had come from KENR in Houston) and Jay Butler (who later went to WQDR-FM, where he stayed for many years as morning personality). WKIX became the first significant country station in the Raleigh market, but with competitive pressures it changed to an "oldies" format in 1986.

From 1990 to 1995, the format was satellite adult standards with some talk shows and sports programming. The call sign changed to WYLT in 1994 when the FM station, also owned by Alchemy Communications, traded letters with the AM.

=== 850 the Buzz ===
The station was a sports radio station known as The Buzz from 1995-2010

The station went all-talk in 1995 as WRBZ, for its "850 The Buzz" branding, but gradually added more sports programming before becoming an all-sports radio station in April 1998. The launch of talk in 1995 was led by syndicated personality Don Imus, who remained on the air for several years.

For six years, The Buzz was an ESPN Radio affiliate. When ESPN insisted that The Buzz carry its shows instead of local programming, The Buzz changed to Fox Sports Radio effective August 1, 2005. Unlike sister station WDNC, which relied more on network programming from ESPN, WRBZ's lineup consisted almost entirely of locally produced sports talk. Until October 2008, WRBZ aired The Herd with Colin Cowherd, from ESPN; both WDNC and WRBZ dropped ESPN programming because the network wanted a stronger commitment than McClatchey was willing to provide. The Imus in the Morning show aired on WRBZ from the time the station switched to sports until the Rutgers University controversy that caused CBS Radio to drop the show.

Don Curtis of Curtis Media had planned to buy WRBZ from Alchemy Communications early in 2005 but was prevented by FCC rules from owning any more stations. His son-in-law Billy McClatchey bought the station instead.

WRBZ celebrated 10 years in the sports radio format on April 10, 2008, with a special guest hosting appearance by The Fabulous Sports Babe, who has largely been in retirement since 2001.

On August 10, 2009, Curtis Media Group announced an intent to purchase WRBZ from McClatchey Broadcasting, with plans to convert the sports-talk station to a music format. Gold and Ovies moved to former sister station WDNC to host a local morning program, while David Glenn hosts an afternoon show on WCMC-FM.

WRBZ was the second flagship station of the Carolina Hurricanes. When the team moved there from Hartford, Connecticut, in 1997, WPTF was the first flagship station. WRBZ later carried Duke University football and basketball games, Carolina Panthers football games, select East Carolina University football games, the Roy Williams and Butch Davis shows, and several other seasonal play by play games.

=== Oldies and WPTF brand extension ===
Early in 2010, WRBZ switched to oldies from the late 1950s and the '60s, with a few '70s songs. The playlist started with 3,000 songs but was expected to be reduced. The target audience was 55 to 70. The station reclaimed its former WKIX callsign soon afterward. WKIX had a very broad-based playlist incorporating some adult standards and classic country material into an oldies playlist spanning the early 1950s to early 1980s.

WKIX ended its oldies format (except for some weekend programming) on March 13, 2012, and reverted to a talk format, branded as TalkRadio 850 WPTF. The brand extension reflected its status as a complement to sister station WPTF's increased emphasis on news programming. The station's call letters were changed to WPTK on March 16. Much of WPTK's programming moved from WPTF and WZTK (the latter of which changed format); some programming was shared with Piedmont Triad sister station WSJS.

On June 8, 2012, WBT in Charlotte announced that Brad Krantz and Britt Whitmire would be taking over the afternoon slot; their show moved from WZTK to WPTK and WSJS and would end June 19.

=== Return to oldies as Just Right Radio ===
WPTK as "Just Right Radio" from 2015-2021.

On August 27, 2015, WPTK changed their format to oldies for a third time, under the moniker "Just Right Radio". The format focused on a wider variety of songs from the 1960s through the '80s, with evenings devoted to love songs and ballads. The station also began broadcasting on FM translators W284CD 104.7 FM Youngsville and W284CP 104.7 FM Raleigh. In addition, the station moved its broadcasts of ECU football and coaches show to sister station WFNL.

On March 10, 2020, WPTK applied to the FCC for a construction permit to move its transmitter site to their sister station WPTF's tower, and lower the station class from B to D, due to the move.

=== Return to WKIX ===
On September 1, 2021, WPTK rebranded as "Oldies 104.7" (the frequency coming from its pair of translators, W284CD and W284CP), returning to the heritage WKIX call letters once again, now playing music from the 1960s and 1970s.

The station temporarily went silent in November 2021, pending transfer of its transmitting site. On November 28, 2021, WKIX's towers at its old transmitter site on Towerview Court, in western Cary near its border with Morrisville, were felled.

WKIX resumed broadcasting on February 10, 2022, using a diplex antenna shared with WPTF and WQDR at their East Chatham Street transmitter site in Cary. This move included reducing WKIX's daytime power from 10,000 to 9,000 watts, and its nighttime operation from 5,000 watts directional to 120 watts non-directional.

A realignment of Curtis Media Group's Raleigh stations on December 26, 2022, saw the 104.7 translators switch to carrying WWPL's programming. WKIX concurrently rebranded as "Oldies 93.5", reflecting its new translator (W228CZ in Cary) on that frequency. A few days later, the station switched to using "Oldies 850" on-air while still broadcasting on 93.5 FM.

Despite its very low frequency, WKIX routinely attracts more listeners than its 50,000 watt sister channel and Curtis Media Group flagship station WPTF 680-AM.

== Translator ==
Broadcast translator for WKIX
Call sign	Frequency	City of license	FID	ERP (W)	Class	Transmitter coordinates	FCC info
W228CZ	93.5 FM	Cary, North Carolina	156763	250	D	35°41′7.6″N 78°43′13″W	LMS
