= WMPW =

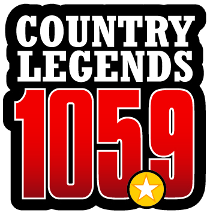
- Danville, Virginia; United States
- Broadcast area: Danville, Virginia; Southern Pittsylvania County, Virginia; Northern Caswell County, North Carolina
- Frequency: 970 kHz
- Branding: Country Legends 105.9

Programming
- Format: Classic country

Ownership
- Owner: Lakes Media, LLC
- Sister stations: WHLF, WKSK-FM, WLUS-FM, WSHV, WWDN

History
- First air date: September 7, 1959
- Former call signs: WYPR (1959–1981); WVOV (1981–2003); DWVOV (2003–2011); WVOV (2011–2011); WMPW (2011–2015); WZDV (2015)

Technical information
- Licensing authority: FCC
- Facility ID: 15501
- Class: D
- Power: 1,000 watts (day); 54 watts (night)
- Transmitter coordinates: 36°33′34.0″N 79°22′2.0″W

Links
- Public license information: Public file; LMS
- Webcast: Listen live
- Website: WMPW Online

WMPW is a Classic Country formatted broadcast radio station licensed to Danville, Virginia in the United States, serving Danville and Southern Pittsylvania County in Virginia and Northern Caswell County in North Carolina. WMPW is owned and operated by Lakes Media, LLC.

== Format change ==
On September 1, 2016, the Classic Country format was dropped in favor of Adult Contemporary and the station's FM translator frequency switched from 103.7 FM to 105.9 FM. The Classic Country format was intended to continue as an online-only station. A year after the station switched to its Adult Contemporary format as "105.9 More FM", it flipped back to Classic Country and brought back the "Country Legends" branding as well.

== Translator ==
In addition to the main station, WMPW is relayed by an FM translator to widen its broadcast area.

Call sign	Frequency	City of license	FID	ERP (W)	HAAT	Class	FCC info
W290DA	105.9 FM	Danville, Virginia	154006	250 watts	101 m (331 ft)	D	LMS
