= WPTF =

News/talk radio station in Raleigh, North Carolina, United States

- Raleigh, North Carolina; United States
- Broadcast area: Research Triangle
- Frequency: 680 kHz
- Branding: FM 92.9 and AM 680 WPTF

Programming
- Format: News/Talk
- Affiliations: Townhall; Fox News Radio; North Carolina News Network; Westwood One; North Carolina Tar Heels

Ownership
- Owner: Curtis Media Group; (First State Communications)
- Sister stations: WBBB, WKIX, WKIX-FM, WKJO, WKXU, WPLW-FM, WQDR, WQDR-FM, WYMY

History
- First air date: October 25, 1924
- Former call signs: WFBQ (1924–1925); WRCO (1925–1927)
- Former frequencies: 1190 kHz (1924–1927); 1380 kHz (1927); 720 kHz (1927); 550 kHz (1927–1928)
- Call sign meaning: "We Protect The Family" (slogan of the station's former owner, Durham Life Insurance Company)

Technical information
- Licensing authority: FCC
- Facility ID: 21630
- Class: B
- Power: 50,000 watts
- Transmitter coordinates: 35°47′38.55″N 78°45′40.02″W
- Translators: 92.9 W225DF (Raleigh); 98.1 W251CA (Rolesville); 98.3 W253CY (Cary); 107.5 W298DB (Smithfield)

Links
- Public license information: Public file; LMS
- Webcast: Listen live
- Website: wptf.com

WPTF (680 AM) is a commercial radio station broadcasting a news/talk radio format. Licensed to Raleigh, North Carolina, the station serves the Research Triangle area. It is owned by the Curtis Media Group, with studios on Highwoods Boulevard near Interstate 440 in Raleigh.

WPTF's transmitter site is a three-tower array off East Chatham Street, near Maynard Road NE, in Cary, North Carolina. Along with WBT in Charlotte, WPTF is one of two North Carolina AM stations powered at the maximum 50,000 watts. However, WBT is a Class A clear-channel station and has more protections from other stations than WPTF, which is classified as Class B. WPTF's daytime signal is non-directional from a single tower. It switches to a directional signal at night from two towers to avoid interference to other stations on 680 kHz. Even with this restriction, at night WPTF can be heard across much of the Southeastern United States with a good radio.

WPTF is relayed by four FM translators: W225DF (92.9 MHz, Raleigh), W251CA (98.1 MHz, Rolesville), W253CY (98.3 MHz, Cary) and W298DB (107.5 MHz, Smithfield).

== Programming ==
Weekday programs on WPTF include local news blocks in morning and afternoon drive times. Three nationally syndicated talk programs are on the weekday line up: The Brian Kilmeade Show, Fox Across America with Jimmy Failla and Red Eye Radio. WPTF's local news coverage is supplemented by the CBS Radio Network, AP Radio and the co-owned North Carolina News Network.

Weekends feature shows on health, money, gardening and home improvement, some of which are paid brokered programming. Long-time staple "The Weekend Gardener", hosted by Mike Raley and Ann Clapp, is heard for three hours on Saturday mornings. Syndicated weekend programs include The Kim Komando Show, Eye on Travel with Peter Greenberg, CBS News Weekend Roundup, Jill on Money with Jill Schlesenger and Face The Nation.

WPTF is the Raleigh/Durham affiliate of the University of North Carolina Tar Heel Sports Network, sharing flagship status with WCHL in Chapel Hill. WPTF carries Tar Heels football and men's basketball games, along with the coaches' shows for both sports and the weekly "Primetime In The ACC" show.

== History ==
=== Founding ===
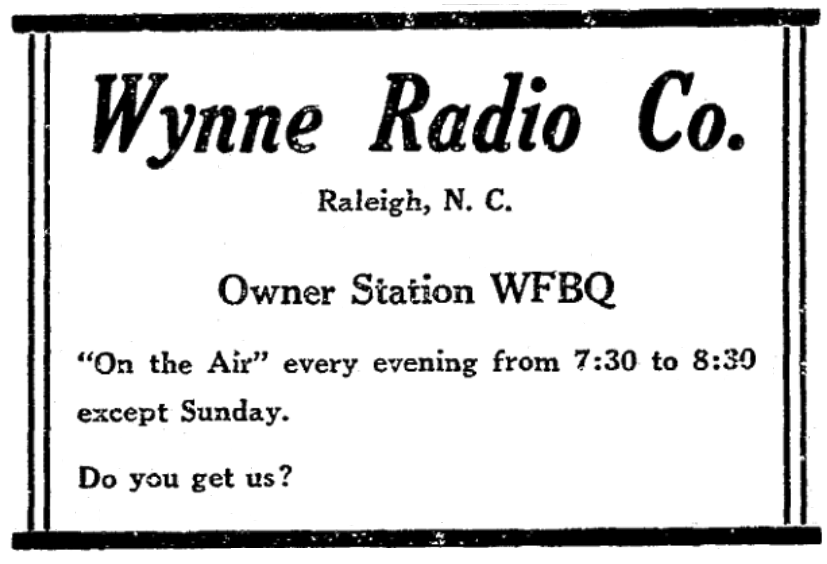
July 22, 1925, advertisement for WFBQ.

WPTF was first licensed on October 25, 1924, as WFBQ with 50 watts on 1190 kHz, to the Wynne Radio Company, owned by William Avera Wynne, at 226 Fayetteville Street in Raleigh. However, earlier that month the company had announced it was broadcasting World's Series reports, and later advertised that "We built and operated said Station long before we received the license" for WFBQ. The original call letters were randomly assigned from a sequential roster of available call signs. WFBQ was the second Raleigh radio station, following the short-lived WLAC, which was licensed to the North Carolina State College from August 31, 1922, to October 29, 1923.

William Wynne had long been a local technical leader. In 1899, he established the Raleigh Telephone Company, and prior to World War One built a radio receiver used to pick up nightly time signals broadcast by NAA in Arlington, Virginia, to accurately set the timepieces at the Jolly-Wynne Jewelry Store. In 1922, at the age of 55, Wynne sold his telephone company and opened the radio equipment store. As of June 30, 1924, he held a license for amateur station 4RU, located at 323 Hillsboro Street in Raleigh.

In 1922, there was rapidly increasing interest by the general public in the recently introduced innovation of radio broadcasting. However, in 1924, there were no local Raleigh radio stations, so listeners were limited to nighttime reception of distant stations, which required more expensive equipment. The establishment of WFBQ provided Wynne Radio Company customers an additional, local, programming source, that could be picked up during daytime hours by less expensive receivers. WFBQ offices and broadcasting facilities were located in the Boone Building next to the Wake County Courthouse.

On August 15, 1925, the call letters were changed to WRCO, for Wynne Radio Company. Operations were moved to the Sir Walter Hotel, with the station's transmitting antenna strung between two towers constructed on the roof. The following year the power was increased to 250 watts. In June 1927, the station was assigned to 1380 kHz.

=== Durham Life Insurance ===
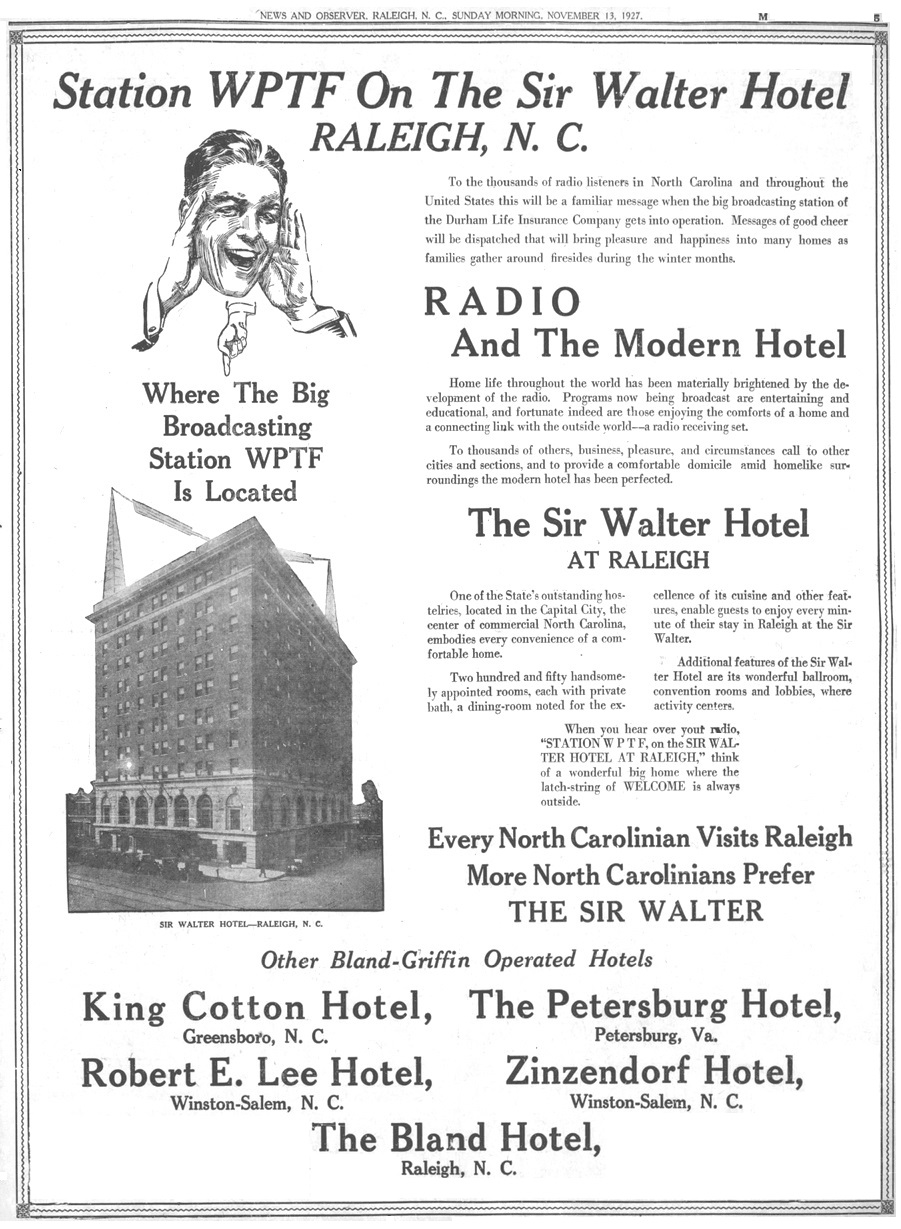
WPTF 's transmitter remained atop the Sir Walter Hotel until 1934.

In the summer of 1927, WRCO was purchased by the Durham Life Insurance Company, which moved the station to 720 kHz, now with 500 watts, and changed the callsign to WPTF, reflecting the new owner's motto of "We Protect The Family". New equipment was purchased and the operations were moved to the basement of the old Durham Life building. Following a series of test transmissions, WPTF made its formal debut on November 14, 1927. On December 1, 1927, the station moved to 550 kHz, which was followed by a power increase to 1,000 watts. William Wynne initially stayed on as station engineer, but later left, continuing to work in the radio industry, and in 1933 set up WEED, the first radio station in Greenville.

On November 11, 1928, with the implementation of the Federal Radio Commission's General Order 40, WPTF was assigned to 680 kHz. KPO in San Francisco was designated as the primary occupant of this "clear channel" frequency, so WPTF was restricted to "limited time" operation, which prohibited WPTF from operating after San Francisco sunset, unless special permission had been received to operate with reduced power for additional hours.

In the early 1930s, WPTF was a pioneer in educational radio. Students in area schools that had radios were able to listen to a daily broadcast, with topics that included "Citizenship", "Science", "Social Studies" and "Art, Music and Literature".

Although many attempts were made over the next several years, it was not until 1933 that the station was authorized to increase its power to 5,000 watts. WPTF purchased new equipment and moved its transmitter site to near Cary, North Carolina, on US Highway 1. Two towers were built, that turned out to be defective, and in June of the next year, winds from a thunderstorm collapsed one of the towers and damaged the other, requiring their replacement. These towers served as a prominent local landmark, and some nearby companies advertised their locations by noting their proximity.

=== Station upgrade ===
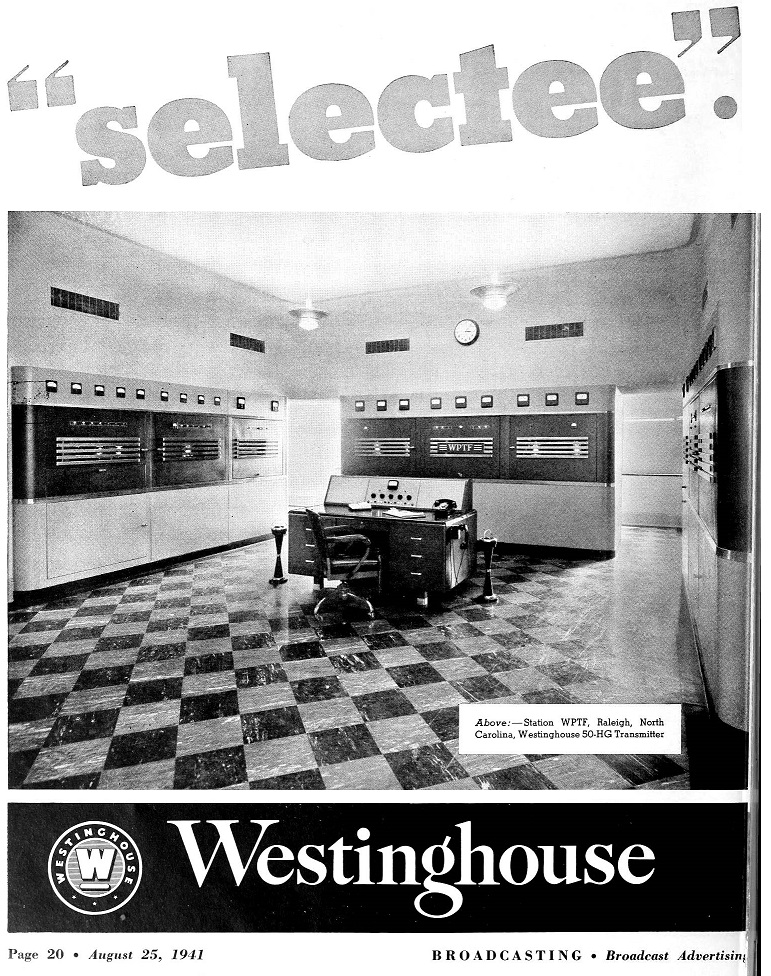
WPTF Control Room for the recently installed 50,000-watt transmitter (1941)

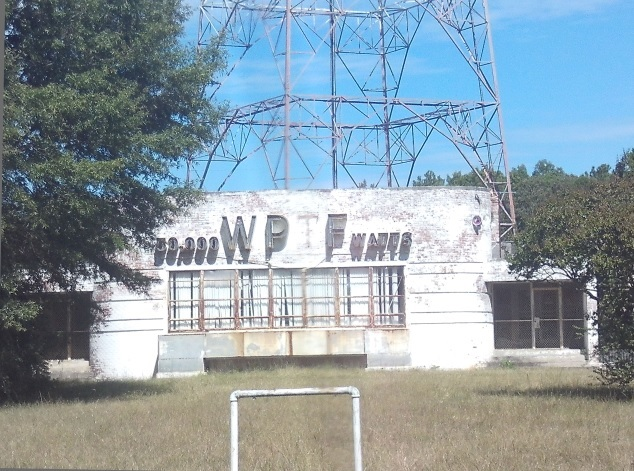
WPTF transmitter building (2022). Originally built in 1940, the Town of Cary has characterized it as "architecturally and culturally significant".

In June 1940, WPTF was authorized to operate unlimited hours, using a directional antenna to limit westward signals after sunset in San Francisco. A month later, the station was granted a construction permit to install new transmitter equipment and increase its power to 50,000 watts, the maximum for AM stations in the U.S. A new transmission plant was constructed at the Cary transmitter site, which included replacing the two existing towers with 370-foot (113-meter) Blaw-Knox towers. The upgrade to 50,000 watts was delayed when a fire destroyed a new transmitter before it could go into regular service. On May 24, 1941, WPTF began operating with a replacement 50,000 watt transmitter. The next day, the station held an "open house" at the transmitter site, to show off "the new equipment, as modern and powerful as any in the country".

As of 1948, WPTF became an affiliate of the NBC Red Network. That year the station also received permission to install a third, taller, tower, designed to support the antenna for a new FM station.

=== Since the 1960s ===
Bart Ritner went to work at WPTF in 1966, staying for 39 years. He hosted the morning show "Ask Your Neighbor", with people giving advice or recipes. His most popular show was "Open Line", an hour-long call-in-show started in 1966 and expanded to two hours in 1973. Don Curtis, whose company later bought the station called the show "one of the nation's first daily two-way talk programs". Ritner moved to news in 1980. He was the only reporter at a 1982 hostage incident at Central Prison, helping to negotiate and end the standoff. Ritner returned to "Open Line" in 1986 and moved it from evenings to afternoons.

By the 1970s, WPTF offered a "full service format with news, talk, and adult contemporary music". On July 1, 1983, WPTF began broadcasting in C-QUAM AM stereo. Bob Kwesell, whose conservative views offended a number of listeners but attracted many newcomer and increased advertising, was dropped on November 17, 1986.

In 1991, Durham Life exited broadcasting to focus on its core insurance business. WPTF served as the flagship station for the NC State Wolfpack sports network for more than 40 years, until in 2008, the Wolfpack Sports Marketing announced it had signed a ten-year deal to move to Capitol Broadcasting Company's WRAL-FM. NC State athletic officials cited their desire to be on an FM signal with a multi-year contract and the ability to collect more local advertising revenue, conditions that Curtis Media was unwilling to provide. Some Wolfpack fans around the East Coast were unhappy with the move because it cut the audience of Wolfpack sports, especially at night, because of the reduced power.

As of September 15, 2008, WPTF began streaming its local and syndicated line up. After the September 2008 death of Jack Boston, Scott Fitzgerald took over North Carolina Morning News. Parent company Curtis Media announced in August 2009 the acquisition of The North Carolina News Network from Capitol Broadcasting Company of Raleigh. On November 2, 2009, Curtis Media President Phil Zachary said that Rush Limbaugh's program would be leaving WPTF on December 31, 2009, after more than 20 years. The show moved to Clear Channel Communications (now iHeartMedia's) FM talk radio station, 106.1 WRDU (now WTKK). The loss of long-time staples Limbaugh and Sean Hannity proved challenging for WPTF, and the station's ratings declined.

Previous WPTF logo, used until 2009

In December 2009, Brian Freeman, program director of sister station WSJS in Winston-Salem, North Carolina took over the same duties at WPTF and became the host of North Carolina's Morning News. WPTF aired NASCAR Sprint Cup Series and Nationwide Series racing, starting with the 2011 Daytona 500.

WPTF's format was split on March 13, 2012, when much of its talk programming moved to sister station WPTK, which was branded as TalkRadio 850 WPTF. WPTF shifted most of its daytime programming to all-news, retaining the NewsRadio 680 WPTF identity. The station continued to air The Dave Ramsey Show in the late morning hours until it was picked up by WTKK on June 15, 2013. In August 2015, WPTK dropped its talk show programs.

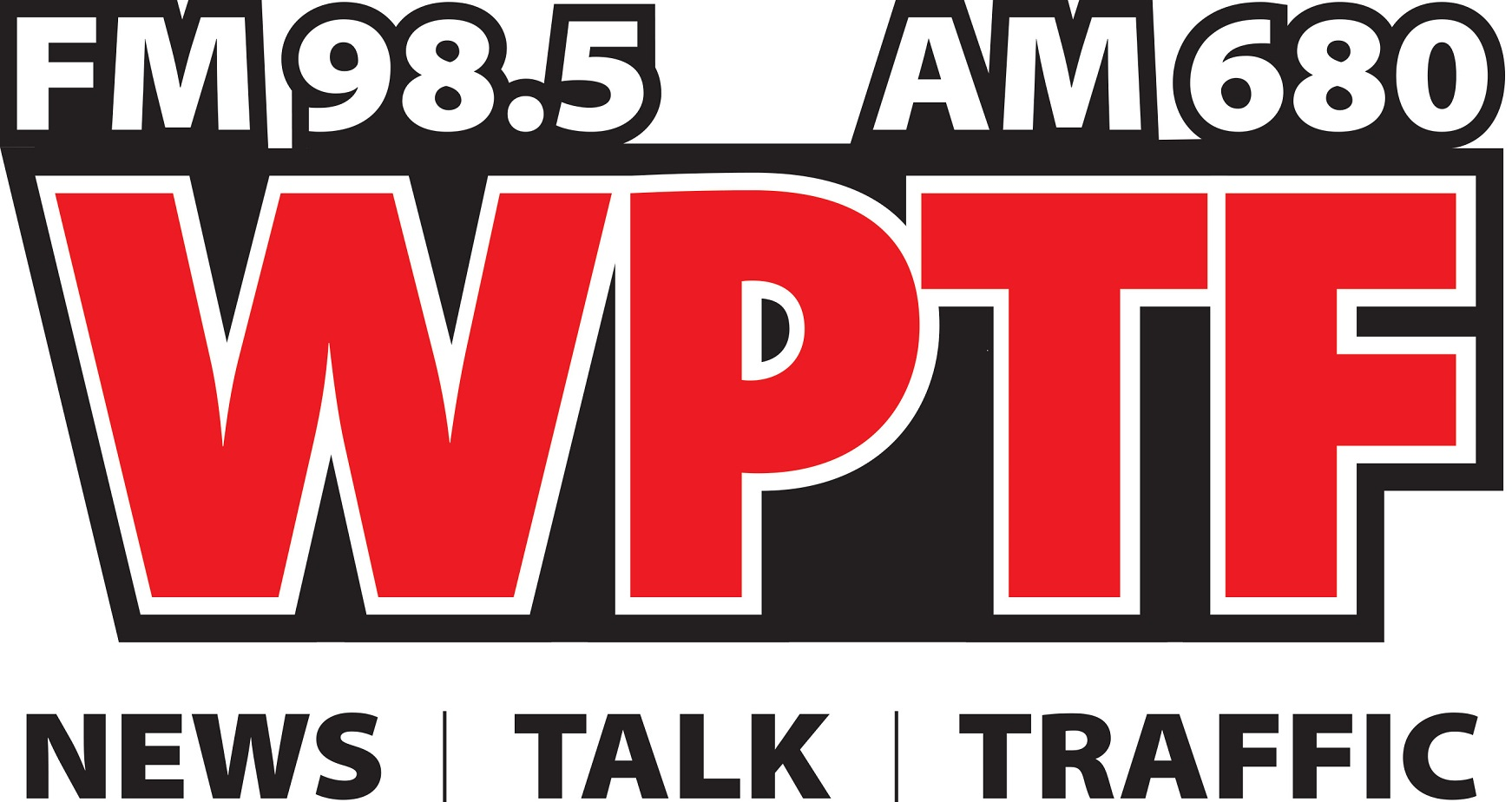
Logo with the 98.5 translator

Until July 16, 2021, WPTF hosted a local talk show on weekday evenings with Tom Kearney. On July 28, 2021, the University of North Carolina at Chapel Hill's Tar Heel Sports Network switched its Raleigh/Durham affiliate from WTKK to WPTF beginning with the 2021 football season. The agreement also included broadcasts of men's basketball, along with the coaches' shows for both sports, and the weekly Primetime in the ACC show. This deal also made WPTF the new flagship station for the network. Charlotte's WBT is also an affiliate of the network; between them, this allows nighttime games to be heard across most of the eastern half of North America.

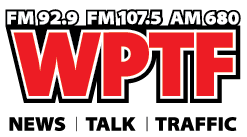
Logo before omitting the 107.5 translator from being shown

In 2024, WPTF replaced the 98.5 translator W253CY with W225DF at 92.9 and changed its branding to FM 92.9/AM 680 WPTF.

Although WPTF remained one of the market's dominant stations through the early 1970s, the rise of FM eroded its audience, and by July 2024 its share of listeners had dropped below 1 percent.

== Hurricane coverage ==
WPTF has historically provided hurricane coverage to residents of the Carolinas. WPTF first provided reports of Hurricane Hazel and has covered most major storms ever since.

Because of WPTF's directional nighttime signal, the station assisted the residents of Charleston, South Carolina, after Hurricane Hugo hit the state in 1989. Most of coastal South Carolina, including the city of Charleston was without power, so local radio stations were knocked off the air. WPTF broadcast emergency information and even won several awards from the state of South Carolina for their assistance.

In 1996, WPTF provided coverage of Hurricane Fran even though the station was without utility power for nearly a week. The station and transmitter site ran on generator power, allowing residents in the Triangle and beyond to call in for storm and damage information and find out where to get needed supplies, such as ice, water, and food.

== In popular culture ==
In 1996, the opening images of the music video for the Squirrel Nut Zippers song Hell included still photographs of the WPTF transmitter site in Cary, to establish the video's 1940s theme.

The exterior facade of the WPTF transmitter building served as an inspiration for the fictional WSQK radio station, featured in the fifth and final season of Stranger Things. The facade was recreated in Chattahoochee Hills, Georgia, for filming, and was struck when filming concluded.

== Sister stations ==
=== WPTF-FM ===
WPTF added an FM station on 94.5 MHz in 1949, with its antenna placed on the tallest of the AM station's three towers. At the beginning both stations operated from 410 South Salisbury street in Downtown Raleigh. The tower used by WPTF-FM when it signed on is currently used by WKIX-FM. WPTF-FM later moved to 94.7. The station played classical music before switching to album rock and the new call letters WQDR-FM in 1973, and later became a Country music station, still co-owned by Curtis Media.

=== WPTF-TV ===
In 1977, Durham Life bought the Triangle's longtime NBC affiliate, WRDU-TV (channel 28) and changed the call letters to WPTF-TV. All three stations were housed at studios in the Highwoods office park on Raleigh's north end. This station is now WRDC Channel 28 and affiliated with My Network TV.
