= WKIX-FM =

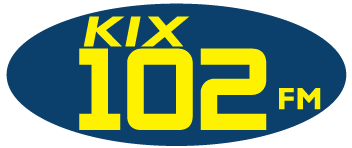
- Raleigh, North Carolina; United States
- Broadcast area: Raleigh–Durham; Research Triangle
- Frequency: 102.9 MHz
- Branding: KIX 102

Programming
- Format: Classic hits

Ownership
- Owner: Curtis Media Group; (FM 102.9 LLC)
- Sister stations: WBBB; WKJO; WKIX; WKXU; WPLW-FM; WPTF; WQDR; WQDR-FM; WYMY

History
- First air date: July 1, 1998 (as WWND)
- Former call signs: WWND (1998–2001); WWMY (2001–2010)
- Call sign meaning: "Kix" (branding)

Technical information
- Licensing authority: FCC
- Facility ID: 4841
- Class: A
- ERP: 1,700 watts
- HAAT: 189 meters (620 ft)
- Transmitter coordinates: 35°47′38.5″N 78°45′40″W
- Repeaters: 102.3 WKJO (Smithfield); 102.5 WKXU (Hillsborough)

Links
- Public license information: Public file; LMS
- Website: www.kix102fm.com

WKIX-FM (102.9 MHz) is a classic hits formatted radio station located in Raleigh, North Carolina, that plays hit music from the 1960s, 1970s, 1980s and 1990s as "KIX 102". Its studios are located in Raleigh, and the transmitter tower is in Cary.

== History ==
The station began operating in 1998 under the callsign WWND, and carried a smooth jazz format as "102.9 the Wind". This setup was very similar in nature to one carried out by another station, WNND-FM 103.9 (now WNNL) from 1990 to 1996. In February 2001, the station began an all-1980s format as "Star 102.9", with new call sign WWMY following shortly thereafter. Goldsboro country station WKIX (96.9 FM) soon joined the new WWMY in a simulcast as WYMY, simulcasting WWMY with 100,000 watts to points east of Raleigh as "Star 96-9 and 102-9".

Over the next two years, Star attempted to tweak its format by becoming a hot AC hybrid for a brief time before switching to a classic hits format. It was during this time that the station carried the syndicated Bob and Sheri morning show, which did not go over well because it often got confused with the Bill & Sheri show on competitor WRAL-FM.

The Star-FM simulcast broke off in 2003 when WYMY became a Spanish-language station known as "La Ley". WWMY continued on with the classic hits format as "Star-FM - SuperStars of the 70s and 80s" until 2005, when it made another format tweak by picking up the oldies mantle from what used to be WTRG and changed their handle to Y102.9, which billed itself as "The Home of Motown, Soul, and Rock 'N Roll." The musical focus then shifted on hits from the 1960s and 1970s.

On February 1, 2007, WWMY began a simulcast with Goldsboro station WWNF (102.3 FM), which shifted its country music format over to WKIX-FM 97.7 in Kinston. WWNF and WKIX had swapped call letters a month prior to the move. This was the first of a series of changes for 102.3 FM, as WWNF became WKIX once again late in 2008.

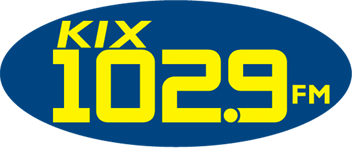
"Kix 102.9" logo before trimulcast

WKIX and WWMY swapped letters early in 2010. As a result, the station dropped its Y102.9 moniker and referred to itself by just the dial position before changing it once again to the current KIX 102.9. In the process, the 1980s tunes that had been on Star-FM previously were added back to the playlist, along with the occasional "lost oldie" from the pre-1964 era. WWMY ended its simulcast with WKIX-FM on October 23, 2010, and began stunting with future simulcast partner WKXU, as part of a change in city of license from Goldsboro to Smithfield.

On January 8, 2014, Curtis Media announced that it purchased WKIX from McClatchey. WKIX would operate under a TMA with a new company to be run by Donna Curtis McClatchey, the daughter of Curtis Media owner Don Curtis. The sale to Curtis Media's FM 102.9 LLC, at a price of $1.229 million, was consummated on December 1, 2014.

WKIX-FM began broadcasting football and basketball games for the Duke Blue Devils, in 2010 after picking up the package from former WRBZ (now WKIX), which dropped sports programming altogether. This continued until 2015, when Duke flagship station WDNC added FM signals to cover the Triangle area.

On December 26, 2022, two additional stations, WKJO in Smithfield and WPLW-FM in Hillsborough, began simulcasting the programming originating from WKIX-FM.

== Other stations called WKIX ==
The callsign WKIX was used for many years by the Raleigh station now known once again as WKIX, followed by the Raleigh station now called WBBB, then the station now with callsign WPLW-FM and, after its first stint on the station now carrying the callsign WKJO, on the station now called WZKT in Kinston, North Carolina. The first station to be called WKIX was WISW in Columbia, South Carolina.
