= WBBB =

Adult hits radio station in Raleigh, North Carolina, United States

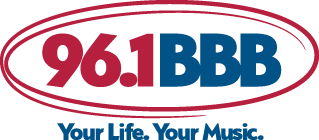
- Raleigh, North Carolina; United States
- Broadcast area: Raleigh–Durham; Research Triangle
- Frequency: 96.1 MHz
- Branding: 96.1 BBB

Programming
- Format: Adult hits

Ownership
- Owner: Curtis Media Group; (Carolina Media Group, Inc.)
- Sister stations: WKIX-FM; WKIX; WKJO; WKXU; WPLW-FM; WPTF; WQDR; WQDR-FM; WYMY

History
- First air date: 1948 (as WNAO-FM)
- Former call signs: WNAO-FM (1949–1955); WKIX-FM (1955–1972); WYYD (1972–1985); WYLT (1985–1993); WKIX-FM (1994–1998)
- Call sign meaning: "We're Building a Better Burlington" (used by another station)

Technical information
- Licensing authority: FCC
- Facility ID: 889
- Class: C0
- ERP: 100,000 watts
- HAAT: 300 meters (980 ft)
- Transmitter coordinates: 35°41′7.6″N 78°43′13″W

Links
- Public license information: Public file; LMS
- Website: www.961bbb.com

WBBB (96.1 FM "96.1 BBB"), is an adult hits radio station in Raleigh, North Carolina. It is owned by the Curtis Media Group with studios on Highwood Boulevard near Interstate 440.

WBBB has an effective radiated power (ERP) of 100,000 watts, the maximum for most FM stations in the U.S. The transmitter tower is on Old Sorrell Road near Blaney Franks Road in Apex, close to Lake Wheeler.

== History ==
=== Early years ===
The station signed on the air in 1948. It was owned by the Raleigh News and Observer and was a network affiliate of ABC Radio. The original call sign was WNAO-FM, simulcasting sister station WNAO (850 AM).

The stations were sold to Sir Walter Television, effective February 13, 1953. In 1955, the station became WKIX-FM, simulcasting much of the programming heard on WKIX AM. When that station switched to a Top 40 format, WKIX-FM continued to simulcast. This move was out of necessity as WKIX's 10,000-watt daytime signal was powered down to a directional 5,000 watts at night, preventing the station from having full area coverage.

=== Beautiful music and soft AC ===
In the late 1960s, the Federal Communications Commission began encouraging simulcast stations to offer a different format on the FM dial. In 1972, WKIX-FM changed its format to beautiful music using the call letters WYYD. It played quarter hour sweeps of mostly instrumental music with only a few commercial interruptions per hour.

In a change announced in March 1983, WYYD gave up its Carson Radio Services beautiful music format for a new sound. It played almost no instrumentals and was described as "between beautiful music and adult contemporary" by general manager Ed Weiss. Burkhart, Abrams, Michaels, Douglas & Associates consulted on the format that included Neil Diamond, Barry Manilow, Barbra Streisand and Kenny Rogers and offered four songs in a row.

Two years later WYYD changed its letters to WYLT ("Lite 96.1"), playing soft adult contemporary music.

In 1992, WYLT had a disco music show called "Saturday Night Fever" airing on Saturday evenings.

=== AAA and country ===
In 1993, WYLT as "Y-96" tried a variation of adult album alternative (AAA). It played mainstream adult contemporary music during the day and alternative rock at night, including artists such as Pearl Jam, 10,000 Maniacs, Shawn Colvin, John Hiatt, The Breeders, and R.E.M. Several area college radio stations played alternative music, but WYLT was a commercial station and had a stronger signal.

WYLT started 1994 by stunting as "W-Garth", playing only Garth Brooks songs. The last song on Y-96 was "It's the End of the World as We Know It (And I Feel Fine)" by R.E.M". On January 5, WYLT traded call letters with WKIX; both stations were owned by Alchemy Communications. The FM station switched to country as a result of the increased popularity of WQDR-FM, but distinguished itself from its competitor with "country your grandparents just wouldn't understand." General manager Rennold Madrazo described the new sound as "very hot, high energy and uptempo, with lifestyle promotions" and targeting yuppies and other upscale listeners. The result was a decline in ratings, followed by a slight increase. Curtis Media Group, the owners of WQDR, bought WKIX for $16 million in 1996.

=== Rock and adult hits ===
In January 1998, the country format and WKIX-FM call letters moved to WPCM and WKTC, and the former WKIX-FM began stunting with a simulcast of WPTF. When the station switched to mainstream rock on January 28, 1998, the WBBB letters were taken from a Burlington, North Carolina, radio station at 920 AM (which was concurrently renamed WPCM). WBBB was called "Real Rock, 96rock" then transitioned to "The Rock Station, 96rock". They later dropped the first half of their name and became known simply as "96rock" and went by the motto "Everything That Rocks."

On November 21, 2011, at midnight, WBBB flipped to adult hits as "Radio 96.1: More Music, Less Blah, Blah, Blah", playing music from the 1970s-2000s. The final song on 96Rock was Wild Side by Mötley Crüe, while the first song on Radio 96.1 was One Way or Another by Blondie.

On April 3, 2017, WBBB rebranded as "96.1 BBB: Your Life. Your Music", with no other changes.
