= Charlie Brown (DJ) =

American radio disc jockey (c. 1942 – 2022)

Ed Weiss (c. 1942 – October 8, 2022), known on air as Charlie Brown, was an American disc jockey and host of the syndicated beach music program On the Beach with Charlie Brown, heard on nearly 40 stations, mostly in The Carolinas, Virginia and Georgia.

== Radio career ==
As a teenager, Eddie Weiss worked as a DJ on various stations playing songs for teens. In 1961, Weiss while working at a radio station in Norfolk, he was told "Eddie Weiss" would no longer be his name. Instead, he would be "Charlie Brown", after the song by The Coasters. After graduating from UNC-Chapel Hill in 1963, Brown worked at a station in Charlotte, where he interviewed Stevie Wonder; Diana Ross brought the singer into the room.

Brown became one of the "KIX Men of Music". From 1964 to 1970, Brown was evening host on top 40 WKIX in Raleigh, North Carolina. After leaving his on-air job, Brown worked in sales and later served as WKIX general manager. He also helped to produce the first beach music records with Atlantic Records. Later, as a partner in Beach Beat Records, he was one of the first to sell beach music records advertised on TV.

In 1996, Brown was the first DJ named to the Carolina Beach Music Hall of Fame.

On the Beach is a three-hour show heard on about 40 stations as of 2015, with about 50 songs from a playlist totalling 650. Artists include Chairmen of the Board, The Embers and The Temptations. In 2010, On the Beach won the Syndicated Radio Show award at the Carolina Beach Music Awards for the fourth year. Brown also won for best AM radio DJ in the years 2004 through 2008 and On the Beach has been named favorite syndicated show every year since 2010.

Tom Taylor says, "His reputation is such that he could be in the middle of the Arctic and still be an important player in beach."

Brown worked at WPCM in Burlington, North Carolina and retired in 2014, except for On the Beach and his weekly show Tuesday afternoons on WHUP-LP/104.7 at Hillsborough, North Carolina.

Brown died at his home on October 8, 2022, at the age of 80.
