= WQDR-FM =

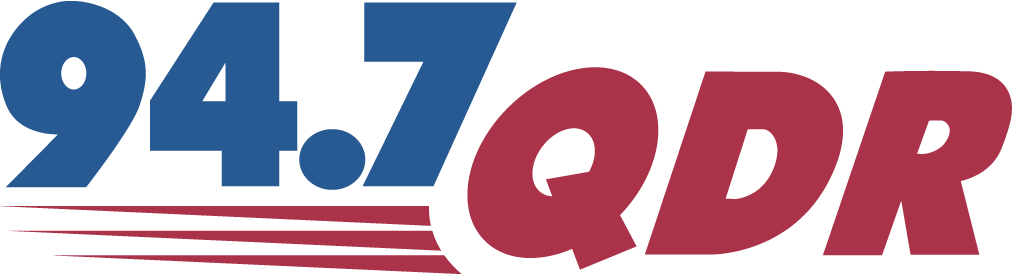
- Raleigh, North Carolina; United States
- Broadcast area: Research Triangle
- Frequency: 94.7 MHz (HD Radio)
- Branding: 94.7 QDR

Programming
- Format: Country music
- Subchannels: HD2: Simulcast of WPLW-FM (Contemporary hit radio); HD3: Simulcast of WQDR 570 AM (Classic rock)
- Affiliations: Compass Media Networks

Ownership
- Owner: Curtis Media Group; (Carolina Media Group, Inc.)
- Sister stations: WBBB; WKIX; WKIX-FM; WKJO; WKXU; WPLW-FM; WPTF; WQDR; WYMY

History
- First air date: August 1949
- Former call signs: WPTF-FM (1949–1972); WQDR (1972–2010)
- Former frequencies: 94.5 MHz (1949–1950)
- Call sign meaning: Quadraphonic rock

Technical information
- Licensing authority: FCC
- Facility ID: 9076
- Class: C
- ERP: 100,000 watts
- HAAT: 512 meters (1,680 ft)
- Transmitter coordinates: 35°40′35.5″N 78°32′8″W
- Translators: HD2 and HD3: see below

Links
- Public license information: Public file; LMS
- Webcast: Listen live
- Website: www.947qdr.com

WQDR-FM (94.7 MHz) is a commercial radio station in Raleigh, North Carolina, broadcasting to the Research Triangle. "94.7 QDR" presents a country music radio format and is owned by the Curtis Media Group. Studios and offices are on Highwoods Boulevard in Raleigh.

WQDR-FM has an effective radiated power (ERP) of 100,000 watts, the maximum for most FM stations. The transmitter is off Business Route 70 in Auburn. WQDR-FM is a Primary Entry Point (PEP) station for the Emergency Alert System, and was previously the Common Program Control Station (or CPCS-1) for the Raleigh operational area of the Emergency Broadcast System. WQDR-FM broadcasts in the HD Radio format. Its subchannels rebroadcast other Curtis stations: Top 40 WPLW-FM 96.9 and classic rock WQDR 570 AM.

== History ==
=== Early years ===
In August 1949, the Durham Life Insurance Company signed on WPTF-FM, then on 94.5 MHz. The station, which moved the following year to 94.7 MHz, transmitted from atop one of co-owned WPTF (680 AM)'s three towers in what is now Cary, near Interstate 40. Both stations had studios and offices in downtown Raleigh at 410 Salisbury Street. During its early years, WPTF-FM simulcast its sister station. In the 1960s and early 1970s, WPTF-FM was separately programmed, airing a classical music format.

The creative force behind a change to a rock music format was Durham Life Broadcasting's then President and general manager, Carl Venters. Venters, who succeeded Richard Mason in June 1972, believed quadraphonic (four channels versus the two channels of the dominant audio format, stereo) music, particularly rock music, to be the wave of the future for FM radio. The new call sign of WQDR was selected to match the phrase "quadraphonic rock".

=== Quadraphonic rock ===
Venters hired Lee Abrams, a 19-year-old broadcaster then working for ABC Radio's progressive rock station in Detroit, WRIF. Abrams' mission was to create an Album Rock format for the Raleigh radio market. Abrams' idea was that album sales should determine a rock station's playlist, with songs from the hottest selling LPs played the most often. Venters also appointed David Berry as station manager. David Sousa was hired as program director, having previously worked with Abrams at WMYQ in Miami. Abrams, Sousa, and Robert W. Walker (an associate of Abrams) created an Album Rock music playlist and a program structure that was later known as the "Superstars" format. WQDR became the first FM station in the nation using this guide.

The new format went on the air on December 26, 1972, at midnight. The last song on WPTF-FM was "Jingle Bell Rock", while the first on WQDR was "Bitch" by the Rolling Stones. Within a year the station had double-digit ratings. After that first year, the "Superstars" format was being used in over 30 markets around the country. Abrams teamed up with veteran consultant Kent Burkhart, and later helped develop music formats for XM Satellite Radio.

In its rock days, WQDR garnered some impressive listener ratings. Among the many memorable on-air personalities during the WQDR rock era were David Sousa, Frank Laseter, Mike Koste, Bill Hard, Jason Janulis, Roger Nelson, Bob Heymann, Steve Mitchell, Mark Silver, John Scott (John Chrystal), Chris Miller, Keith Wilson, Jim Huste, Sean Sizemore (Sean Scott), and Rad Messick. In later years, the air staff included Greg Wells, Jo Leigh Ferriss, Bob Kirk (Robert Kirk), Daniel Brunty, Tom Gongaware, Bob Walton, Rockin' Ron Phillips, Tom Guild, Tim Sullivan(Tim Sampair over-nights), John Lisle, Steve Kahn, Tom Evans, Brian McFadden, Cabell Smith (who was previously WDBS's morning classical DJ), Bob Robinson, and Pat Patterson, who was hired for mornings in 1978 after years at crosstown Top-40 station WKIX. In 1981, WQDR's News Department won a Peabody Award for a series produced by News Director Gayle Rancer and Joan Siefert on Vietnam Vets, entitled "Our Forgotten Warriors." It was an accomplishment almost unheard of at the time for a rock-music radio station and a first for a North Carolina radio station. This extensive and comprehensive investigative news series also reeled in an Ohio State Award and other honors regionally and nationally.

In 1977, the Durham Life Broadcasting Company bought a local television station, Channel 28 WRDU-TV (now WRDC) in Durham. WQDR's transmitter joined Channel 28, renamed WPTF-TV, using a 1,200-foot (370 m) tower that stood off Penny Road in Apex.

=== Switch to country ===
Despite continued success as a rock station into the 1980s, the Durham Life Broadcasting Company decided WQDR would have more success in the country music format. Venters left to form Voyager Communications group in 1982. In the summer of 1984, Durham Life Broadcasting, under Don Curtis' management, announced plans to switch WQDR's format to country in September. This predictably set off a howl of protest from listeners, and added media coverage for the station and its staffers. When Durham Life flipped WQDR to country music in early September 1984, several fired DJs and a number of off-air personnel re-appeared on 106.1 WRDU-FM (now WTKK), owned by Voyager Communications. WRDU-FM made the opposite switch, going from Country to Rock, on the same day as WQDR's format flip.

WQDR ended its run as a rock station exactly how it began 12 years earlier, closing out with "Bitch" by the Rolling Stones. The running joke at the time was that WQDR stood for "We Quit Doing Rock". WQDR, now playing country, and WRDU-FM playing rock, enjoyed ratings success in the following years.

WQDR's switch to country gave listeners in the Raleigh market the chance to hear their favorite country artists on a full-power FM station, broadcasting in stereo. Until the 1980s, most country stations were on the AM band. In 1987, Durham Life moved the studios for WQDR and WPTF radio from Salisbury Street to a new broadcast center at 3012 Highwoods Boulevard in North Raleigh, where they were joined by WPTF-TV, which moved from studios on NC Highway 54 in Durham. On December 10, 1989, WPTF-TV, broadcasting from a 2,000-foot (610 m) antenna in Auburn, lost its tower when it collapsed due to uneven ice thawing. WPTF-TV returned to its former tower in Apex, with WQDR, to be joined by 101.5 WRAL-FM, whose site on the WRAL-TV tower was also destroyed that same day. When WRAL-TV and WPTF-TV re-built a common tower at the Auburn site, both radio stations soon moved there. Since that tower placement substantially increased WQDR's antenna height above average terrain, its effective radiated power was reduced to 95 kilowatts to conform to the FCC's "Class C" FM station parameters. In 1991, after a scandal involving the station manager being accused of sexual harassment that prompted her to resign, Durham Life divested its broadcast properties, with WQDR and sister AM station WPTF going to what is now the Curtis Media Group.

After three nominations in previous years, WQDR won Country Music Association Large-Market Station of the Year in 2011.

In 2010, the station's call sign changed from WQDR to WQDR-FM. The -FM suffix was added to the callsign to allow co-owned AM 570 WDOX to switch its call sign to WQDR. The AM station had at that time flipped to a classic country format, playing many of the past country hits made popular on 94.7 WQDR-FM years ago.

== Programming ==
WQDR's morning radio team, dubbed "The Q Morning Crew," features former overnight personality Mike Wheless and Amanda Daughtry. From 2004 to 2006 The Q Morning Crew also included the country singer Heather Green. After Green's exit, the show added broadcasting newbie Janie Carothers and Marty "The One Man Party" Young to the lineup. It is one of the most popular morning radio shows in the Raleigh media market.

Until the end of 2010, WQDR also aired MRN and PRN radio broadcasts of the NASCAR Sprint Cup series races. Those broadcasts were relocated to co-owned 680 WPTF.

Some of the notable radio announcers that used to work at the radio station included long-time employee and morning man Jay Butler, Program Director and afternoon drive personality Dale Van Horn, and fan favorite Amy Ashe in mid mornings. In January 2018, then-Program Director and afternoon drive time personality Lisa McKay died at age 54. She fell ill during the Christmas holidays and tests confirmed she had bile duct cancer.

During the mid-1990s, Jerry Carrol hosted a show called Wild Man Wednesday. The show aired from 7 to 9 a.m. every week on Wednesday.

== Translators ==
Broadcast translators for WQDR-FM HD2
Call sign	Frequency	City of license	FID	ERP (W)	Class	Transmitter coordinates	FCC info
W254AS	98.7 FM	Rolesville, North Carolina	143226	250	D	35°56′26.5″N 78°28′44″W	LMS
W279EJ	103.7 FM	Hillsborough, North Carolina	152725	250	D	36°6′13.7″N 78°57′55.7″W	LMS
W284CP	104.7 FM	Raleigh, North Carolina	148876	99	D	35°47′35.5″N 78°45′37″W	LMS
W284CD	104.7 FM	Youngsville, North Carolina	148873	250	D	36°3′56.5″N 78°29′25″W	LMS

Broadcast translators for WQDR-FM HD3
Call sign	Frequency	City of license	FID	ERP (W)	Class	Transmitter coordinates	FCC info
W227CZ	93.3 FM	Durham, North Carolina	142785	200	D	36°6′13.5″N 78°57′56″W	LMS
W228CV	93.5 FM	Chapel Hill, North Carolina	156986	125	D	35°52′15.5″N 79°9′39″W	LMS
W262CZ	100.3 FM	Raleigh, North Carolina	141736	250	D	35°34′43.6″N 78°26′9″W	LMS
