= WYMY =

- Burlington, North Carolina; United States
- Broadcast area: Research Triangle and Piedmont Triad
- Frequency: 101.1 MHz
- Branding: La Ley 101.1

Programming
- Language: Spanish
- Format: Regional Mexican - Spanish Contemporary Hits

Ownership
- Owner: Curtis Media Group; (Carolina Radio Group, Inc.)
- Sister stations: WBBB; WKIX-FM; WKIX; WKJO; WKXU; WPLW-FM; WPTF; WQDR; WQDR-FM

History
- First air date: December 1946; 79 years ago
- Former call signs: WBBB-FM (1946–1973); WNCB (1973–1978); WPCM (1978–1998); WCPM-FM (1998); WKXU (1998–2004); WZTK (2004–2013)
- Former frequencies: 101.3 MHz (1946-1947)

Technical information
- Licensing authority: FCC
- Facility ID: 9080
- Class: C0
- ERP: 100,000 watts
- HAAT: 358.5 meters (1,176 ft)
- Transmitter coordinates: 35°56′15.5″N 79°26′29.1″W

Links
- Public license information: Public file; LMS
- Webcast: Listen live
- Website: www.laleync.com

WYMY (101.1 FM, "La Ley 101.1") is a commercial radio station licensed to Burlington, North Carolina. It airs a radio format mixing Regional Mexican music and Latin contemporary hits, serving the Piedmont Triad and Research Triangle areas, including Raleigh–Durham–Greensboro–High Point and Winston-Salem. It is owned by the Curtis Media Group with studios on Highwoods Boulevard near Interstate 440 in Raleigh.

WYMY has an effective radiated power (ERP) of 100,000 watts, the maximum for most FM stations. The transmitter is atop Bass Mountain in the Cane Creek Mountains in Alamance County. Curtis Media claims WYMY covers the most listeners of any North Carolina radio station, due to its mountaintop tower allowing its signal to reach two radio markets and into Virginia. Programming is also heard on sister stations WFMC in Goldsboro (AM 730 and 105.7 FM) and on WWMC in Kinston (1010 AM and 92.9 FM).

== History ==
=== WBBB-FM and WNCB ===
The station signed on the air at 101.3 in December 1946 as WBBB-FM. It moved one notch lower on the FM dial to 101.1 MHz a few years later. It was the sister station to WBBB (now 920 WPCM). They were owned by the Alamance Broadcasting Company with studios at 310 1/2 South Main Street in Burlington. They largely simulcast their programming and were network affiliates of the Mutual Broadcasting System.

In the late 1960s, the two stations separated their programming. The FM station played automated easy listening music and switched its call sign to WNCB.

=== WKXU Country ===
Starting in 1978, WPCM flipped to a country music format as "Country 101". It also got a boost to its current 100,000 watt power.

During the 1990s, the station paired up with WKIX in Goldsboro, North Carolina, and targeted listeners in the Raleigh market. At one point, the call letters were changed to WKXU. For a time, management decided to go after more mature country listeners. It began playing classic country. A short time later, WKXU returned to contemporary country music, calling itself Kix 101.1.

=== WZTK Talk ===
The station changed to a news/talk format under the WZTK call letters on July 6, 2004. The first live voices heard on "FM Talk 101.1" were those of Brad Krantz and Britt Whitmire, who remained with the station for the format's duration. WZTK's sister AM station WPCM 920, previously known as WBBB, simulcast the FM's talk programming until summer 2005, when it went back to its oldies and beach music format.

WZTK aired ABC News Radio updates at the beginning of each hour. Listeners heard a variety of national talk shows including Michael Savage and Alan Colmes with financial advice from Clark Howard, as well as local and state issues. WZTK was an affiliate of the Carolina Panthers Radio Network and carried Wake Forest University football and men's basketball. FM Talk 101.1 also offered smooth jazz on weekends. WZTK was once an affiliate of Jones Radio Networks's Smooth Jazz satellite-delivered format until it was discontinued on September 30, 2008. Smooth Jazz continued to air weekends on WZTK without announcers, with music provided by Jones Radio/Dial Global.

On February 14, 2007, WZTK's parent company, Curtis Media Group, closed a purchase of 600 WSJS, 1230 WMFR, and WSJS's simulcast partner 1200 WSML. This gave Curtis a monopoly on news/talk in the Triad until 94.1 WPTI and 106.1 WRDU switched to talk radio in January 2010. Both WMFR and WSML joined newly acquired WCOG to form Triad Sports Radio later that year.

On March 12, 2012, Curtis Media Group announced it would end WZTK's news/talk format after 8 years. Wake up hosts Brad and Britt along with syndicated shows from Neal Boortz and Clark Howard all moved to WSJS and WPTK, while Alan Colmes, Michael Savage, and Allan Handelman were displaced entirely.

=== Regional Mexican ===
At midnight on March 13, 2012, after the second hour of The Alan Colmes Show, the station flipped to a simulcast of WWPL. This was a placeholder move as Curtis Media Group prepared a new format that they promised would have more community service and long-term profitability. WZTK launched its new format in Spanish on April 3 by simulcasting WYMY, this time as "La Ley 96.9 & 101.1 FM".

Logo before the two simulcasts

On January 3, 2013, WZTK's call sign was changed to WYMY. At that point, 96.9 FM in Goldsboro became WBZJ and ended the simulcast. On March 11, 2014, the simulcast briefly resumed. But six months later it ended again after WYMY solved some weather-related signal problems.

On April 14, 2025, WWMC in Kinston, North Carolina and WFMC in Goldsboro changed their formats to a simulcast of WYMY.
