= WKXU (FM) =

Simulcast of WKIX-FM Raleigh
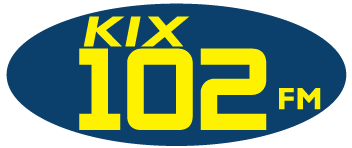
- Hillsborough, North Carolina; United States
- Broadcast area: Research Triangle
- Frequency: 102.5 MHz
- Branding: KIX 102

Programming
- Format: Classic hits

Ownership
- Owner: Curtis Media Group; (New Century Media Group, LLC)
- Sister stations: WBBB; WKJO; WKIX-FM; WKIX; WPLW-FM; WPTF; WQDR; WQDR-FM; WYMY

History
- First air date: 1989 (as WHLQ)
- Former call signs: WHLQ (1989–2004); WKXU (2004–2010); WPLW (2010–2019); WPLW-FM (2019–2023)
- Call sign meaning: Kix

Technical information
- Licensing authority: FCC
- Facility ID: 22322
- Class: A
- ERP: 1,500 watts
- HAAT: 203.8 meters (669 ft)
- Transmitter coordinates: 36.104°N 78.966°W

Links
- Public license information: Public file; LMS
- Webcast: Listen live
- Website: www.kix102fm.com

WKXU (102.5 MHz) is a classic hits formatted commercial FM radio station licensed to Hillsborough, North Carolina, and serving the Research Triangle, including Durham and Raleigh. The station simulcasts the "KIX 102, Carolina's Greatest Hits" programming of hit music from the 1960s, 1970s, 1980s and 1990s that originates from WKIX-FM (102.9 FM) in Raleigh. The station is owned by New Century Media Group. According to FCC ownership filings, New Century Media Group is 100% owned by Donald W. Curtis, chairman and CEO of Curtis Media Group.

WKXU has an effective radiated power (ERP) of 1,500 watts and is considered a Class A FM station. By contrast, some Raleigh-area stations, such as WNCB and WRDU run 100,000 watts. The transmitter is off Bivins Road north of Durham.

== History ==
The station signed on from Louisburg in 1989 as WHLQ, an adult contemporary station branded as Q-102.5. The station later began simulcasting a country music format with its sister AM station, WYRN.

Curtis Media Group purchased WHLQ and WYRN from Franklin Broadcasting in 2003. The following year, the call letters were changed to WKXU. The station, called Country 102.5, moved in a more contemporary direction, playing only songs from the previous 20 years.

Initial "Pulse 102" logo while simulcasting with 102.3

In September 2010, WKXU signed off from its Louisburg site and signed on again October 23 from a new site in northwestern Durham County, licensed to Hillsborough. At that time, the station began stunting, along with new simulcast partner WWMY. On October 27, WKXU changed its call letters to WPLW, while WWMY became WWPL. On October 31, at 5PM, after several days of Halloween music, the stunting ended and both stations debuted their new rhythmic contemporary format as "Pulse 102". The first song on "Pulse" was "I Like It" by Enrique Iglesias ft. Pitbull. The format was described as "sort of the hip-hop and R&B that has crossed over into Top 40." Its primary target audience was women aged 25 to 34, and was expected to compete with Radio One station K 97.5 and Clear Channel's G105, and 93.9 Kiss FM, who ironically transitioned from Rhythmic AC to Rhythmic Top 40 after Pulse 102 signed on. The stations played 10,000 songs in a row and promised fewer commercials than other stations. Artists include Lady Gaga, Enrique Iglesias and Kesha. By October 2011, WPLW was added to the Mediabase contemporary hit radio panel.

As of 2014, WPLW also could be heard on a translator at W226BV (93.1 FM). In September 2014, the simulcast with WWPL changed from 102.3 FM to 96.9 FM.

Previous logo

On May 28, 2019, the call sign was changed from WPLW to WPLW-FM, in order to allow the WPLW call sign to be assigned the next month to AM 570 in Raleigh. On December 26, 2022, WPLW-FM, along with WKJO, began simulcasting the classic hits programming originating from WKIX-FM. The station changed its callsign back to WKXU to associate it with the "Kix" branding on January 11, 2023.
