= WSSG =

- Goldsboro, North Carolina; United States
- Frequency: 1300 kHz
- Branding: 92.7 Jamz

Programming
- Format: Urban contemporary

Ownership
- Owner: Donald Curtis; (Eastern Airwaves, LLC)

History
- First air date: October 22, 1955
- Former call signs: WGOL (1955–1969); WYNG (1969–1982)
- Call sign meaning: Soul Soothing Gospel (former format)

Technical information
- Licensing authority: FCC
- Facility ID: 14390
- Class: D
- Power: 1,000 watts day 49 watts night
- Transmitter coordinates: 35°24′08″N 78°01′20″W
- Translator: 92.7 W224DD (Goldsboro)

Links
- Public license information: Public file; LMS

WSSG (1300 kHz) is a radio station licensed to Goldsboro, North Carolina. The station is currently owned by Donald Curtis' Eastern Airwaves, LLC.

Before its Jack FM format, WSSG was simulcasting country-formatted WZKT.

On August 7, 2017, WSSG changed their format from adult hits (as "Jack FM") to urban contemporary, branded as "92.7 Jamz".

== Translators ==
WSSG operates an FM translator at 92.7 FM.

| Call sign | Frequency | City of license | FID | ERP (W) | Class | FCC info |
|---|---|---|---|---|---|---|
| W224DD | 92.7 FM | Goldsboro, North Carolina | 142670 | 250 | D | LMS |
