= WWMC =

Radio station in Kinston, North Carolina

- Kinston, North Carolina; United States
- Frequency: 1010 kHz
- Branding: 1010 AM & 92.9 FM La Ley

Programming
- Language: Spanish
- Format: Contemporary hit radio–Latin pop–reggaeton–tropical music

Ownership
- Owner: Donald W. Curtis; (Eastern Airwaves, LLC)
- Sister stations: WELS-FM

History
- First air date: September 1950 (as WELS)
- Former call signs: WELS (1950-2015)

Technical information
- Licensing authority: FCC
- Facility ID: 20408
- Class: D
- Power: 1,000 watts day 78 watts night
- Transmitter coordinates: 35°17′0.00″N 77°39′53.00″W
- Translator: 92.9 W225CD (Kinston)

Links
- Public license information: Public file; LMS
- Webcast: Listen Live
- Website: laleync.com

WWMC (1010 AM, "1010 & 92.9 La Ley") is a radio station broadcasting a Spanish Contemporary hit radio–Latin pop–reggaeton–tropical music format. Licensed to Kinston, North Carolina, United States, the station is currently owned by Donald W. Curtis, through licensee Eastern Airwaves, LLC.

== History ==
The station was owned by Kinston Christian Radio, Inc. when it began a Simulcast on WSTK 104.5 FM is beginning on January 25, 2011. FCC ownership filings indicated that Kinston Christian Radio is owned by Bishop Levi E Willis, Sr of Willis Broadcasting of Norlfolk, Virginia. Willis Broadcasting operated several dozen stations that broadcast gospel music targeted at African Americans.

WELS AM 1010 went off the air on November 7, 2012. The station became WWMC-AM Gospel 1010 with a new translator with 250 watts on 92.9 FM W225CD in 2015.

On April 14, 2025, WWMC changed their format from gospel to a simulcast of WYMY, branded as "La Ley".
