= WPLW-FM =

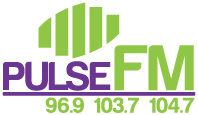
- Goldsboro, North Carolina; United States
- Broadcast area: Raleigh–Goldsboro–; Rocky Mount–Greenville, North Carolina
- Frequency: 96.9 MHz
- Branding: Pulse FM

Programming
- Format: Contemporary hit radio

Ownership
- Owner: Curtis Media Group; (New Age Communications, Ltd.)
- Sister stations: WBBB, WGBR, WKJO, WKIX-FM, WKIX, WKXU, WPTF, WQDR, WQDR-FM

History
- First air date: October 26, 1946
- Former call signs: WGBR-FM (1946–1949); WEQR (1949–1989); WKTC (1989–1998); WKIX (1998–2001); WYMY-FM (2001); WYMY (2001–2013); WBZJ (2013–2014); WWPL (2014–2023)
- Former frequencies: 99.7 MHz (1946–1950); 93.3 MHz (1950–1954)
- Call sign meaning: "Pulse"

Technical information
- Licensing authority: FCC
- Facility ID: 48369
- Class: C0
- ERP: 100,000 watts
- HAAT: 300 meters (980 ft)
- Transmitter coordinates: 35°23′52.6″N 78°8′6″W
- Repeater: 94.7 WQDR-FM HD2 (Raleigh)

Links
- Public license information: Public file; LMS
- Website: thenewpulsefm.com

WPLW-FM (96.9 MHz, "Pulse FM") is a contemporary hit radio station licensed to Goldsboro, North Carolina, which is east of the Research Triangle. The station is owned by Curtis Media Group. Its studios are located in Raleigh, and its transmitter is near Princeton, North Carolina.

Its programming is carried on four translators: 98.7 FM (W254AS) in Rolesville, North Carolina, 103.7 FM (W279EJ) in Hillsborough, North Carolina, 104.7 FM (W284CP) in Raleigh, North Carolina, and 104.7 FM (W284CD) in Youngsville, North Carolina, all relayed by WQDR-FM HD2.

== History ==
Originally WGBR-FM at 99.7 FM and then 93.3 FM, this Goldsboro station for most of its early history originally simulcast its AM counterpart. The station is the oldest FM station in eastern North Carolina when it was first launched on October 26, 1946. It switched its call letters to WEQR in 1949. During much of the late 1970s and into the 1980s, the station, under the nickname "Q96", underwent several format changes over the years including soft rock (1978–1980), contemporary rock (1980–1984) and adult contemporary (to 1987) until evolving into a CHR station. In 1989, Curtis Media Group bought the station and moved the country music format and calls of Tarboro's WKTC from 104.3 to 96.9. The WEQR letters and hot adult contemporary format went to the former WOKN at 102.3 FM. "Katie Country" existed at 96.9 until January 9, 1998. The 96.9 frequency was then given the WKIX calls from what is now WBBB. This station also ran a country format, simulcasting with WKXU in Burlington as "Kix 96.9 and 101.1". This station simulcast WWMY from 2001 to 2003 as an 80s station until it changed its format and language.

On March 7, 2003, at 5 p.m., WYMY broke from the WWMY simulcast and flipped to regional Mexican as "La Ley 96.9". With the flip, the station became the strongest FM Spanish-language station in the Southeastern United States. The last song on "Star" was "La Bamba" by Los Lobos, while the first song on "La Ley" was "La Cucaracha" by Kumbia Kings.

On April 3, 2012, WYMY began a simulcast on WZTK (101.1 FM) in Burlington, North Carolina, which lasted until January 3, 2013.

Logo while simulcasting with WPLW-FM

On January 3, 2013, at 12:00 am, WYMY changed its format to urban adult contemporary, branded as "96.9 BZJ", and changed call letters to WBZJ. The radio station carried the nationally syndicated Steve Harvey Morning Show and urban adult contemporary programming throughout the remainder of the day.

On March 11, 2014, WBZJ changed its format back to regional Mexican, once again branded as "La Ley 96.9" and simulcasting WYMY. On September 3, 2014, WBZJ changed its format to CHR, branded as "Pulse FM", simulcasting WPLW (102.5 FM). On September 11, WBZJ changed its call letters to WWPL to go with the "Pulse FM" branding, as the former WWPL on 102.3 changed its calls to WFNL-FM.

A realignment of Curtis Media Group's Raleigh stations on December 26, 2022, saw WPLW-FM replace "Pulse FM" with a simulcast of WKIX-FM, reducing the format's reach in the Durham portion of the market. Concurrently, a pair of translators on 104.7, which had been carrying the programming of WKIX AM, joined WWPL in carrying "Pulse FM", improving the format's coverage of Raleigh. The realignment was prompted by Curtis Media Group's re-acquisition of 102.3 FM (now WKJO), a move made possible after WWPL was deemed to no longer count as a Raleigh–Durham market station for the purposes of ownership limits.

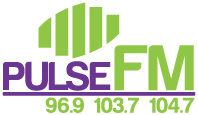
Logo before 98.7 translator sign on

On January 11, 2023, translator W279EJ 103.7 returned on the air, simulcasting "Pulse FM" and restoring coverage to much of the Durham portion of the market. Also, 96.9 changed its call letters to WPLW-FM, as 102.5 changed its call sign from WPLW-FM back to WKXU.
