= WKJO (FM) =

Simulcast of WKIX-FM Raleigh
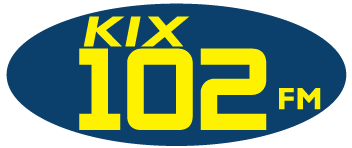
- Smithfield, North Carolina; United States
- Broadcast area: Raleigh-Durham, North Carolina–Goldsboro, North Carolina
- Frequency: 102.3 MHz
- Branding: KIX 102

Programming
- Language: English
- Format: Classic hits

Ownership
- Owner: Curtis Media Group; (FM 102.3 LLC)
- Sister stations: WBBB; WKIX; WKIX-FM; WKXU; WPLW-FM; WPTF; WQDR; WQDR-FM; WYMY

History
- First air date: 1972 (as WOKN-FM)
- Former call signs: WOKN-FM (1972–1991); WEQR (1991–2001); WKIX-FM (2001); WKIX (2001–2006); WWNF (2006–2008); WKIX (2008–2010); WWMY (2010); WWPL (2010–2014); WFNL-FM (2014–2015)
- Call sign meaning: Wake and Johnston counties

Technical information
- Licensing authority: FCC
- Facility ID: 61259
- Class: A
- ERP: 2,600 watts
- HAAT: 153.4 meters (503 ft)
- Transmitter coordinates: 35°34′43.6″N 78°26′9″W

Links
- Public license information: Public file; LMS
- Webcast: Listen live
- Website: www.kix102fm.com

WKJO (102.3 MHz) is a classic hits formatted FM radio station licensed to Smithfield, North Carolina. The station is owned by Curtis Media Group, and primarily simulcasts the "KIX 102, Carolina's Greatest Hits" programming of hit music from the 1960s, 1970s, 1980s and 1990s that originates from WKIX-FM 102.9 in Raleigh. WKJO's transmitter tower is northwest of Smithfield in rural Clayton, North Carolina.

== History ==
WOKN was urban contemporary before picking up the callsign WEQR and adult contemporary format from 96.9 FM in 1990. WEQR simulcast WEQQ in Pinetops with a hot adult contemporary format and the name "The Double Q".

Beasley Broadcast Group sold WEQR to Curtis Media in 1996. WEQQ became WKTC in 1998 and WEQR continued with the format until 2001, when the station began simulcasting WKXU; the country music format and callsign WKIX moved from 96.9 FM. Branding during this time included Kix 102.3 and Country 102.

The station swapped callsigns with 97.7 FM in Kinston in 2006, becoming WWNF. The country music format also moved to 97.7 FM, and on February 1, 2007, WWNF began to simulcast Raleigh oldies station WWMY.

WWNF assumed the callsign WKIX once again late in 2008. Curtis Media completed construction of a new tower in Johnston County in 2009 on Little Creek Church Road in Clayton. In early 2010, WKIX and WWMY swapped call letters.

Logo as "Pulse 102"

WWMY ended its simulcast with WKIX-FM on October 23, 2010, and began stunting with future simulcast partner WKXU, which also moved to a new transmitter location, as part of a change in city of license from Goldsboro to Smithfield. On October 27, WWMY became WWPL, and WKXU became WPLW. On October 31, at 5PM, the stunting ended and both stations debuted their new rhythmic contemporary format as "Pulse 102". The first song played was "I Like It" by Enrique Iglesias ft. Pitbull. The format is described as "sort of the hip-hop and R&B that has crossed over into Top 40." Its primary target audience was women aged 25 to 34, and the station was expected to compete with Radio One station K 97.5 and Clear Channel's G105 and 93.9 Kiss FM, who ironically transitioned from Rhythmic AC to Rhythmic Top 40 after Pulse 102 signed on. The stations debuted playing 10,000 songs in a row and promised fewer commercials than other stations. Artists include Lady Gaga, Enrique Iglesias and Ke$ha. By October 2011, WPLW and WWPL were both added to the Mediabase contemporary hit radio panel.

In January 2014, Triangle Marketing Associates, Inc. filed an application with the FCC to purchase WWPL from Curtis Media Group's New Age Communications, Inc. On September 3, 2014, the Pulse format moved from WWPL to sister station WBZJ. On September 12, 2014, WWPL changed their call letters to WFNL-FM as the station ended its Pulse FM simulcast and began stunting with liners redirecting Pulse listeners to 96.9 and 102.5. At that time, the WWPL calls moved to 96.9. On September 26, 2014, WFNL-FM ended stunting and launched a bluegrass format, branded as "Bluegrass 102.3". The format launch came days before Raleigh hosted the International Bluegrass Music Association convention and music festival, better known as World of Bluegrass 2014. The FCC approved the sale of WFNL to Triangle Marketing Associates in October 2014. Though intended to be a temporary placeholder, the bluegrass format continued through November 30, 2014, when Triangle Marketing Associates, Inc. closed on its acquisition of the station. Curtis sold the station to avoid running afoul of FCC ownership limits when Curtis acquired WKIX-FM.

On December 1, 2014, WFNL-FM went silent as Triangle Marketing Associates, Inc began the relocation of station studios from the Curtis Media studios in Raleigh to Johnston County. New owner Triangle Marketing Associates planned to debut a format intended to serve Johnston County.

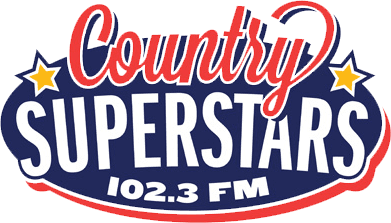
Logo as "Country Superstars 102.3"

On January 1, 2015, "Country Superstars 102.3" made its debut. On January 23, 2015, WFNL-FM changed their call letters to WKJO, intended to represent Wake and Johnston Counties. The station's transmitter is located 7 miles from Wake County.

In September 2022, the station was once again purchased by Curtis Media Group from Triangle Marketing Associates for $2,080,000. The purchase was made possible by the fact that WWPL is no longer counted towards the FCC's ownership caps for the Raleigh-Durham market.

On December 15, 2022, due to the sale, the staff exited the station. The next day, the sale closed, and at midnight the next day, after playing "Brokenheartsville" by Joe Nichols, WKJO dumped the country format for the third time and began stunting with Christmas music as "Christmas 102.3". The first song on Christmas 102.3 was "The Holly and the Ivy" by Roger Whittaker. On December 26, 2022, WKJO, along with WPLW-FM, began simulcasting the classic hits programming originating from WKIX-FM.
