= WQDR (AM) =

- Raleigh, North Carolina; United States
- Broadcast area: Research Triangle
- Frequency: 570 kHz
- Branding: Rock FM

Programming
- Language: English
- Format: Classic rock

Ownership
- Owner: Curtis Media Group; (Triangle Broadcast Associates, LLC)
- Sister stations: WBBB, WKIX-FM, WKIX, WKJO, WKXU, WPLW-FM, WPTF, WQDR-FM, WYMY

History
- First air date: October 25, 1954; 72 years ago
- Former call signs: WMSN (1954–1959); WSHE (1959–1962); WLLE (1962–1997); WRDT (1997–1999); WDTF (1999–2003); WDNZ (2003–2006); WDOX (2006–2010); WQDR (2010–2012); WFNL (2012–2017); WQDR (2017–2019); WPLW (2019–2021)
- Call sign meaning: "Quadraphonic rock" (from sister station WQDR-FM)

Technical information
- Licensing authority: FCC
- Facility ID: 61698
- Class: D
- Power: 1,000 watts (day); 40 watts (night)
- Transmitter coordinates: 35°47′35.55″N 78°45′40.02″W
- Translator: 98.3 W252EL (Cary)
- Repeater: 94.7 WQDR-FM HD3 (Raleigh)

Links
- Public license information: Public file; LMS
- Webcast: Listen live
- Website: www.rock929triangle.com

WQDR (570 kHz; "Rock FM") is a classic rock radio station, licensed to Raleigh, North Carolina, which serves the Research Triangle region. WQDR's studios are located in Raleigh, and its transmitter is co-located at the WPTF transmitter site in Cary.

Its programming is carried over the station's translator on 98.3 FM (W252EL) in Cary, North Carolina, as well as WQDR-FM-HD3, which in turn is relayed by translators at 93.3 FM (W227CZ) in Durham, North Carolina, 93.5 FM (W228CV) in Chapel Hill, North Carolina, and 100.3 FM (W262CZ) in Raleigh, North Carolina.

== History ==
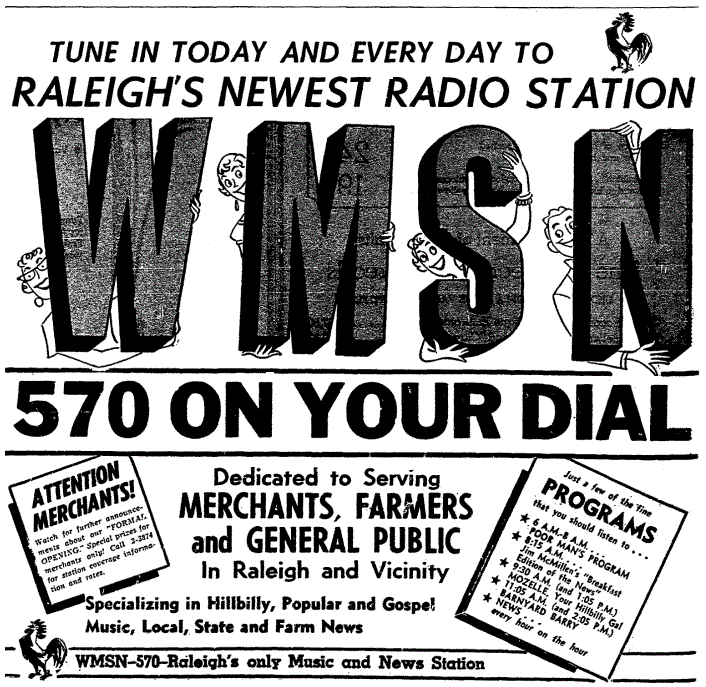
1954 station advertisement

The station was first licensed in 1954 as WMSN, with 500 watts, daytime-only, on 570 kHz. The station manager was B. H. Ingle Sr., pastor of the First Missionary Church and owner of B. H. Ingle & Sons Roofing and Heating Company. Programming was advertised as "Hillbilly, Western, and Gospel music, Associated Press news, weather reports and news of local and county interest". The debut broadcast scheduled for October 17 had to be delayed by 8 days due to damage from Hurricane Hazel.

In late 1955, an application was made to transfer station ownership to Merchants & Farmers Radio Station WMSN Inc., for "$8,000 plus other considerations", and in early 1959, the station's call sign was changed to WSHE. One provision of the station sale was that B. H. Ingle would continue to have one half-hour of air time each weekday from 10:30 to 11:00 a.m. for a religious program, which was later modified to the last half-hour of each broadcast day. However, as of August 17, 1959, station management barred Ingle from making any further broadcasts, on the grounds that he was carrying on "an attack on many forms of organized religion, and a denunciation of laymen and ministers holding religious beliefs other than which you have".

In 1962, the station was sold by Raleigh Broadcasting Corp. to the Raleigh-Durham Broadcasting Company for $180,000. The station made its debut as WLLE on February 15, 1962, and became known as "Hot 57", Raleigh's home for rhythm and blues. Also known as "Wonderful Willie", WLLE played James Brown, Little Richard, The O'Jays, and Earth Wind & Fire, and it could be heard as far away as Walkertown and Wallace-Rose Hill. Its DJs included Oscar "Daddy O on the Radio" Alexander, Sweet Bob Rogers, Chester "CD" Davis, J. Willie Moore, Big Bill Haywood, Prince Ike Behind the Mike, Jimmy Johnson of JJ's House Party, and Brother James Thomas. Ray "Dr. Jocko" Henderson, who later became well known in Detroit, was popular with both black and white listeners in the 1960s. He is credited with helping Raleigh get through difficult times during integration of the schools and the death of Martin Luther King Jr. His style came from Douglas "Jocko" Henderson of Philadelphia and Durham's Dr. Jive of WSRC.

WLLE was the first radio station in the state to interview Coretta Scott King and the first black radio station to interview a grand dragon of the Christian Knights of the Ku Klux Klan. Wallace LaCrosse Hankin bought WLLE in 1966. WLLE became the station for Raleigh's black community, and it was the second most popular AM station.

In 1977, the Federal Communications Commission (FCC) revoked WLLE's license, after an investigation begun in 1973 determined that the station had engaged in improper billing practices. The station was allowed to continue broadcasting while it appealed this ruling, and the legal proceedings did not end until October 1979, when the U.S. Supreme Court upheld the license revocation. At this point, station owner Wallace L. Hankin was given until January 27, 1980, to find a charitable or non-profit organization to assume station operations, but was unable to meet this deadline, and the station suspended broadcasting. However, a short time later, the Roman Catholic Diocese of Raleigh formed Faith Communications, Inc., which was granted a temporary "Interim Operation" authorization to take over the station, with most programming unchanged.

In 1981, the FCC conducted competitive hearing between three applicants to acquire the station, and selected Special Markets Media, Inc., owned by Prentice J. Monroe (75%) and her husband Henry (25%), who continued its well-known R&B format. In the early 1990s, "Let's Talk", hosted by Frank Roberts, aired 5 nights each week and dealt with the problems of blacks.

In 1997, WLLE was purchased by Mortenson Broadcasting of Kentucky, who changed its call letters to WRDT and began airing religious talk. 2 years later, the station was picked up by Curtis Media and the call letters were changed once again to WDTF, continuing on with the religious talk format and adding inspirational music to the mix.

In 2003, the station changed its format to current general talk and call letters to WDNZ to match its one-time simulcast partner, Durham-based WDNC. The station continued to air much of the same programs as WDNC, save for mornings and sports broadcasts featuring the Carolina Mudcats, even though both stations had aired Charlotte Bobcats games briefly. All that changed in late 2005 when WDNC broke off the simulcast to become an all-sports station with an entirely separate staff, LMAed by McClatchey Broadcasting, owners of WRBZ, 850 AM.

The general talk format continued on WDNZ after that point, with the calls changing to WDOX in September 2006. The call letters were a reference to its moniker "Home of the Docs", as it aired programming featuring Dr. Laura Schlessinger and Dr. Joy Browne. In addition, WDOX was also home to local and regional programming such as "State Government Radio" and "Triangle In-Touch". On weekends, the station offered "Million Dollar Music", featuring musical favorites dating back to the 1950s that were no longer played on most oldies formats. The music segments were hosted by longtime Triangle area radio personalities Pat Patterson and Maury O'Dell.

In May 2010, the station changed its call letters to WQDR and its format to classic country to go along with sister station WQDR-FM, which plays contemporary and hit country music. WQDR went off the air beginning April 16, 2011, when its transmitter off South Saunders Street near downtown Raleigh was badly damaged by a tornado.

WFNL's logo for its "Funny 570" format.

Following numerous delays in securing a new transmitter site, the station eventually returned to the airwaves on February 22, 2012, transmitting from one of the towers of sister station's WPTF transmitter site in Cary. At that time, the station began to air an all-comedy format under the moniker "Funny 570", and its call letters were changed to WFNL, which stood for "We're Fun N Laughs". The station initially served as the Triangle affiliate for Premiere Radio Networks' 24/7 Comedy radio network, until it was discontinued on August 3, 2014. At that point, WFNL switched to the "Today's Comedy" network feed.

Beginning with the 2015 season, WFNL broadcast East Carolina University Pirates football games and the weekly coaches show. The station inherited this package from sister station WPTK, which had recently changed formats.

In May 2017, WFNL dropped the comedy format, and began simulcasting full-time the news/talk programming of co-owned WPTF in Raleigh.

On November 15, 2017, the station returned to the call letters WQDR and a classic country format, "Just Right Country", featuring songs "from the 60s to the 90s and beyond".

Logo as Hot AC "Star 92.9", 2019-2020

On June 4, 2019, WQDR flipped to hot adult contemporary, branded as "Star 92.9" (in reference to FM translator W225DF that was acquired the previous month, and began simulcasting the new format upon launch). Also timed with the new format, the station took call sign WPLW from its sister hit music station, WPLW-FM. "Star" was the Triangle affiliate of The Bob and Sheri Show.

On December 28, 2020, at Midnight, WPLW and W225DF flipped to classic rock as "Rock 92.9". The first song on "Rock 92.9" was "Tom Sawyer" by Rush. The call sign was changed back once again to WQDR on February 9, 2021, this time referencing WQDR-FM's heritage as a rock station from 1972 to 1984.

In 2024, WQDR became "The Triangle's Rock FM" and dropped the W225DF translator, replacing its primary signal with W252EL at 98.3 MHz. However, WLUS-FM in Clarksville, Virginia complained that W252EL was causing interference to its southern coverage, so W252EL suspended operations on April 11, 2025, while also applying to reduce its power from 150 to 6 watts. W252EL resumed operations on August 26, 2025, however, WLUS complained that this still caused impermissible interference, and on April 10, 2026, the FCC ordered W252EL to again shut down, "to address interference complaints". The translator later resumed operation with a directional antenna and reduced power.

== 57WLLE.net ==
In September 2018, Gary Antwon Williams, a former WLLE employee, started the Internet radio service 57WLLE.net, with soul and R&B from the 1970s, 1980s, and 1990s, recalling the WLLE of the past. Plans call for community affairs programming.

== Translator ==
Broadcast translator for WQDR
| Call sign | Frequency | City of license | FID | ERP (W) | Class | Transmitter coordinates | FCC info |
|---|---|---|---|---|---|---|---|
| W252EL | 98.3 FM | Cary, North Carolina | 157569 | 150 6(CP) | D | 35°47′36″N 78°45′37″W | LMS |
