= WSFL-FM =

- New Bern, North Carolina; United States
- Broadcast area: Kinston; New Bern; Havelock
- Frequency: 106.5 MHz (HD Radio)
- Branding: 106.5 WSFL

Programming
- Format: Classic rock
- Subchannels: HD2: Simulcast of WNCT (Beach music)
- Affiliations: Premiere Networks

Ownership
- Owner: Curtis Media Group Inc.; (CMG Coastal Carolina, LLC)
- Sister stations: WIKS; WMGV; WMJV; WNCT

History
- First air date: April 29, 1968
- Former call signs: WVWB-FM (1966–1973); WSFL (1973–1985)

Technical information
- Licensing authority: FCC
- Facility ID: 70497
- Class: C1
- ERP: 100,000 watts
- HAAT: 279 meters (915 ft)
- Transmitter coordinates: 35°2′27.6″N 77°21′9.9″W

Links
- Public license information: Public file; LMS
- Webcast: Listen Live
- Website: www.wsfl.com

WSFL-FM (106.5 MHz) is a classic rock radio station located in New Bern, North Carolina, that broadcasts to the entire eastern region of North Carolina. It has been around for several decades and is considered a fixture in the local community.

== History ==
WSFL was one of the first Top 40 FM stations in North Carolina. During the 1980s the format switched to adult contemporary.

In December 1986, Caravelle Broadcast Group Inc. completed its purchase of WSFL-FM and Kinston radio stations WISP and WQDW.

In March 1989, after Ayatollah Khomeini issued a fatwā against Salman Rushdie for writing The Satanic Verses, WSFL-FM burned all of its Cat Stevens records.

WSFL and several other stations went off the air for a while, but WSFL-FM came back with an album rock format. By 1994, WSFL-FM was airing John Boy and Billy.

In 1995, WSFL (1380 AM) became WCOO after J4 Broadcasting bought the station along with WCKO in Norfolk, Virginia, and WCKN in Myrtle Beach, South Carolina. These stations began using the WCIN "Classic Oldies" format of R&B, jazz and blues.

On February 2, 2017, Beasley Media Group announced that it would sell its six stations and four translators in the Greenville-New Bern-Jacksonville, North Carolina market, including WSFL-FM, to Curtis Media Group for $11 million to reduce the company's debt. The sale was completed on May 1, 2017.
