= WNCT =

WNCT may refer to:

- WNCT-TV, a television station (channel 12, virtual 9) licensed to Greenville, North Carolina, United States
- WNCT (AM), a radio station (1070 AM) licensed to Greenville, North Carolina, United States
- WNCT-FM, a radio station (107.9 FM) licensed to Greenville, North Carolina, United States
- WNDT-CD, a television station (channel 13) licensed to Manhattan, New York, United States, which held the call sign WNCT-CD in 2018
