= Cyril Vetter =

American songwriter

Cyril Vetter is an American songwriter with a career has spanned a variety of industries, including music, broadcasting and publishing. He owned TV and radio stations, a television production firm, newspapers as well as music recording and publishing companies. He may be best known for the popular song "Double Shot (Of My Baby's Love)", co-written with Don Smith.

== Career ==
Vetter performed as drummer for the Greek Fountains, a 1960s group composed largely of Baton Rouge youths. As the British Invasion dominated rock and roll and Rhythm & Blues in the mid-1960s, the members wore moptop hair and Madras pants. The band was popular in the Gulf Coast region in many venues. They opened for such concert performers as The Animals, Sonny and Cher, Paul Revere and the Raiders, and the Dave Clark Five. Their Mercury Records single of "Countin' the Steps" was a regional hit with noteworthy airplay in the Southeast. In January 2010, songwriter Vetter was inducted into the Louisiana Music Hall of Fame.

"Double Shot (Of My Baby's Love)" was originally recorded by Dick Holler & the Holidays, and later recorded by The Swingin' Medallions who released it as their second single in 1966. The song became a Top 20 hit for the group, peaking at #17 on the U.S. Billboard Hot 100. The song has since been recorded by other artists, including Joe Stampley.

Vetter's most recent project was Dirtdobber Blues, a fictionalized biography of longtime friend singer/songwriter/actor Charles "Butch" Hornsby, a multimedia package complete with 14 song CD, sheet music and photographs of his artwork.

In addition to Dirtdobber Blues, (release March 2011), LSU Press has published two of Vetter's previous books. Fonville Winans' Louisiana: Politics People and Places, a biography of the legendary Louisiana photographer Fonville Winans, includes historical subjects such as Huey P. Long and unmistakably iconic Louisiana figures and locales. "The Louisiana Houses of A. Hays Town", another Vetter collaboration with Gould vividly records through drawings and photographs Town's major contributions to the vernacular of original Louisiana architecture.

== Personal life ==
In 2003, Vetter wrote and produced Deacon John's Jump Blues, a critically acclaimed and award-winning music CD, concert video and documentary film.

A U.S. Army veteran, Vetter served in Vietnam and was awarded the Bronze Star Medal. He earned political science and law degrees from Louisiana State University. Vetter practiced law in Louisiana from 1973 to 2012.

== Discography ==
Year	Main Artist	Title	Label	Role
1965	The Greek Fountains	Well Alright / That's The Way I Am	Bofuz Enterprises, Inc.	Co-Writer on 'That's The Way I Am'
1966	The Greek Fountains	Blue Jean / Countin' The Steps	Philips	Co-Writer
1966	The Swingin' Medallions	Double Shot (Of My Baby's Love) / Here It Comes Again	Philips	Co-Writer on 'Double Shot (Of My Baby's Love)'
1966	The Swingin' Medallions	I Don't Want To Lose You Baby / Night Owl	Smash Records	Co-Writer on 'Night Owl'
1966	The Flying Cavarettas / Jimmy Cavaretta	I Tried To Treat You Right / I Want To Be Free	V&O	Co-Writer on 'I Tried To Treat You Right' & Co-Producer
1966	The Dry Grins	You're Through / She's A Drag	Montel Michelle	Co-Producer
1966	John Fred	Leave Her Never / Doing The Best I Can	Paula Records	Co-Producer & Writer on 'Doing The Best I Can'
1966	John Fred And His Playboys	Outta My Head / Loves Come In Time	Paula Records	Co-Producer
1967	John Fred And His Playboys	34:40 Of John Fred And His Playboys	Paula Records	Writer on 'Doing The Best I Can'
1967	John Fred And His Playboys	Up And Down / Wind Up Doll	Paula Records	Co-Writer on 'Wind Up Doll'
1967	John Fred And His Playboys	Agnes English	Paula Records	Writer on 'Most Unlikely To Succeed'
1967	The Uniques	Groovin' Out (On Your Good, Good Lovin') / Areba	Paula Records	Co-Writer on 'Groovin' Out (On Your Good, Good Lovin')'
1967	J. J. Stately	Another Saturday Night / The Skill Of The Magician	Josie	Writer on 'The Skill Of The Magician', Co-Producer
1967	The Greek Fountains	I'm A Boy / She Does It	Pacemaker Records	Co-Writer on 'She Does It' & Co-Producer
1967	The Greek Fountains	I Can't Get Away / An Experimented Terror	Montel Michelle	Co-Producer
1977	John Fred And His Playboys	Juke Box	Guinness Records	Writer on 'Keep It Hid'
1979	Irma Thomas	Safe With Me	RCS Records	Co-Producer on 'Safe With Me', 'Take What You Find', 'Don't Stop' & 'Looking Back'
1990	Various	Beyond The Calico Wall	Voxx Records	Co-Writer on 'An Experimented Terror'
2003	Various	Deacon John's Jump Blues	Vetter Communications Corporation	Co-Producer
