= WFBS =

WFBS may refer to:

- WFBS-LP, a low-power radio station (107.9 FM) licensed to serve Salem, South Carolina, United States
- WBWX, a radio station (1280 AM) licensed to serve Berwick, Pennsylvania, United States, which held the call sign WFBS from 2000 to 2011
