= God in Three Persons (album) =

Studio album by the Residents
- Released: 1988
- Genre: Talking blues
- Length: 61:48
- Label: Rykodisc
- Producer: The Residents

The Residents chronology
13th Anniversary Show - Live In Holland (1987)	God in Three Persons (1988)	The King & Eye (1989)

Singles from God in Three Persons
- 1. "Holy Kiss of Flesh" Released: 1988

Professional ratings
Review scores
Source	Rating
AllMusic	5/5 stars
The Philadelphia Inquirer	4/4 stars

God in Three Persons is the fourteenth studio album by American art rock group the Residents, released in 1988. It is about a man—arbitrarily named 'Mr. X'—who befriends two conjoined twins. The songs are all sung in a rhythmic spoken word fashion, similar to talking blues. The entire lyrical content of the album is written in trochaic octameter, a rare poetic meter most famously used in Edgar Allan Poe's poem "The Raven". A central motif of the album is the organ riff from "Double Shot (Of My Baby's Love)" by 1960s frat rock band the Swingin' Medallions. A companion soundtrack album, featuring most of the instrumental backing tracks, was also released.

God in Three Persons received a 5-star rating from AllMusic.

== Storyline ==
The album is the story of a Colonel Tom Parker-type character called Mr. X, who finds a pair of conjoined twins who have miraculous healing powers. He convinces them to let him manage their careers, touring them as holy healers and conducting services during which they cure the masses. Mr. X begins to lust after the "female" twin, then realizes that the twins' sexes are fluid rather than fixed. When he discovers that the twins are far more worldly than he had believed, and therefore less under his control, he plots a vicious rape in which he severs the connection between the two, splitting them forever. In the denouement, he realizes that his feelings for the twins were not being imposed on him by the twins, but came from within himself.

The story is narrated in the first person by Mr. X. He is accompanied throughout by instrumental music and sung commentary by Laurie Amat, who acts as a "Greek Chorus" (and sings the opening credits on the first track).

== Track listing ==
1. "Main Title from 'God in 3 Persons'" - 3:52
2. "Hard & Tenderly" - 4:36
3. "Devotion?" - 3:36
4. "The Thing About Them" - 4:05
5. "Their Early Years" - 4:39
6. "Loss of a Loved One" - 4:50
7. "The Touch" - 3:30
8. "The Service" - 5:02
9. "Confused (By What I Felt Inside)" - 4:37
10. "Fine Fat Flies" - 4:26
11. "Time" - 1:18
12. "Silver, Sharp and Could Not Care" - 3:03
13. "Kiss of Flesh" - 9:39
14. "Pain and Pleasure" - 4:35
- Soundtrack tracks:
1. "Main Titles (God in Three Persons)" - 3:38
2. "Hard and Tenderly" - 3:44
3. "The Thing About Them" - 3:25
4. "Their Early Years" - 2:43
5. "Loss of a Loved One" - 3:10
6. "The Touch" - 2:08
7. "The Service (Part 1)" - 2:51
8. "The Service (Part 2)" - 1:28
9. "Confused by What I Felt Inside" - 5:37
10. "Kiss of Flesh" - 9:25
11. "Pain and Pleasure" - 2:00

== Live performances ==
Starting in May 2019, the Residents undertook a short tour performing exclusively tracks from the album, beginning at a Residents-themed event at Bourges, France, with a significantly shortened version of the album.

The next performances of the show were in January 2020, featuring a significantly reworked and more theatrical set design. The first of these performances was a public dress rehearsal at The Lab in San Francisco, the rehearsal was received well, earning a favourable review from The New Yorker.

An updated performance, which took place at the Museum of Modern Art, received considerably more attention than the band's usual output, being reviewed by Rolling Stone, Brooklyn Vegan, and The Art Forum.
