= WQFB-LP =

- Flagler Beach, Florida; United States
- Broadcast area: Daytona Beach, Florida
- Frequency: 97.3 MHz
- Branding: Surf 97.3

Programming
- Format: Oldies/Beach music

Ownership
- Owner: Save the Surf, Inc.

History
- First air date: June 30, 2014

Technical information
- Licensing authority: FCC
- Facility ID: 194909
- Class: L1
- ERP: 31 watts
- HAAT: 52.7 meters (173 ft)
- Transmitter coordinates: 29°29′45″N 81°08′07″W

Links
- Public license information: LMS
- Webcast: Listen Live
- Website: flaglerbeachradio.com

WQFB-LP (97.3 FM, Surf 97.3) is an American low power FM radio station licensed to serve the community of Flagler Beach, Florida, United States. The non-commercial radio station programs an oldies format mixed with Carolina Beach Music. The station is locally owned by Save the Surf, Inc., and managed & operated by Vern Shank of Pyramid Music Productions, Inc.
