= WBWT =

WBWT may refer to:

- WRTH-LP, a low-power radio station (101.5 FM) licensed to serve Greenville, South Carolina, United States, which held the call sign WBWT-LP from 2016 to 2018
- WTSJ-LD, the Milwaukee, Wisconsin affiliate for the Spanish-language MundoMax network, formerly known as WBWT-LP
- WWTI-DT2, the CW network affiliate for Watertown, New York, formerly branded as "WBWT"
