= WMBL =

WMBL can refer to:

- Western Major Baseball League (WMBL), now known as Western Canadian Baseball League
- WMBL (FM), an FM radio station licensed to Mitchell, Indiana
- WMBL (AM), a former radio station in Morehead City, North Carolina
