= WRTH =

WRTH may refer to:

- WRTH-LP, a low-power radio station (101.5 FM), licensed to serve Greenville, South Carolina, United States
- WLTS (FM), a radio station (103.3 FM), licensed to serve Greer, South Carolina, which held the call sign WRTH from 2014 to 2023
- KZQZ, a radio station (1430 AM), licensed to serve St. Louis, Missouri, United States, which held the call sign WRTH from 1991 to 2005
- KFNS (AM), a radio station (590 AM), licensed to serve Wood River, Illinois, United States, which held the call sign WRTH from 1965 to 1988.
- World Radio TV Handbook
