= WNCT-TV =

Television station in Greenville, North Carolina

- WNCT's current logo shares the school colors of East Carolina University.

- Greenville–Washington–New Bern–; Jacksonville, North Carolina; United States
- City: Greenville, North Carolina
- Channels: Digital: 12 (VHF); Virtual: 9
- Branding: WNCT 9; Eastern North Carolina CW (9.2)

Programming
- Affiliations: 9.1: CBS; 9.2: CW+; for others, see § Subchannels

Ownership
- Owner: Nexstar Media Group; (Nexstar Media Inc.)

History
- First air date: December 22, 1953
- Former call signs: WNCT (1953–1965)
- Former channel numbers: Analog: 9 (VHF, 1953–2009); Digital: 10 (VHF, 2000–2020)
- Former affiliations: Both secondary: DuMont (1953–1955); ABC (1953–1962)
- Call sign meaning: North Carolina Television

Technical information
- Licensing authority: FCC
- Facility ID: 57838
- ERP: 35.2 kW
- HAAT: 573.6 m (1,882 ft)
- Transmitter coordinates: 35°21′55.9″N 77°23′34.6″W

Links
- Public license information: Public file; LMS
- Website: www.wnct.com

WNCT-TV (channel 9) is a television station in Greenville, North Carolina, United States, affiliated with CBS and owned by Nexstar Media Group. Its second subchannel serves as an owned-and-operated station of The CW (via The CW Plus), as Nexstar owns a majority stake in the network. WNCT-TV's studios are located on South Evans Street in Greenville, and its transmitter is located in Grifton Township along NC 118.

WNCT-TV is recognized as the oldest operating television station in Eastern North Carolina and the fourth oldest in North Carolina.

== History ==
The station signed on December 22, 1953, and aired an analog signal on VHF channel 9. It is the fourth-oldest continuously operating television station in North Carolina (behind Charlotte's WBTV, Greensboro's WFMY-TV, and Winston-Salem's WXII-TV) and the oldest station in the eastern part of the state. The station was originally owned by The Daily Reflector along with WGTC radio (1590 AM and beginning in 1963, 107.7 FM).

It has always been a primary CBS affiliate but also carried some ABC shows along with Washington-based NBC outlet WITN-TV (channel 7). It became an exclusive CBS affiliate when WNBE-TV (channel 12, now WCTI-TV) signed on from New Bern in 1963. WNCT maintained a secondary relation with DuMont from 1953 until the network shut down in 1955. From 1959 until 1998, it aired a weekday morning talk show known as Carolina Today, which included local hosts such as Robert Allen (aka "Slim Short"), Jim Woods and Judge Charles H. Whedbee. WNCT was the first station in the area to broadcast in color.

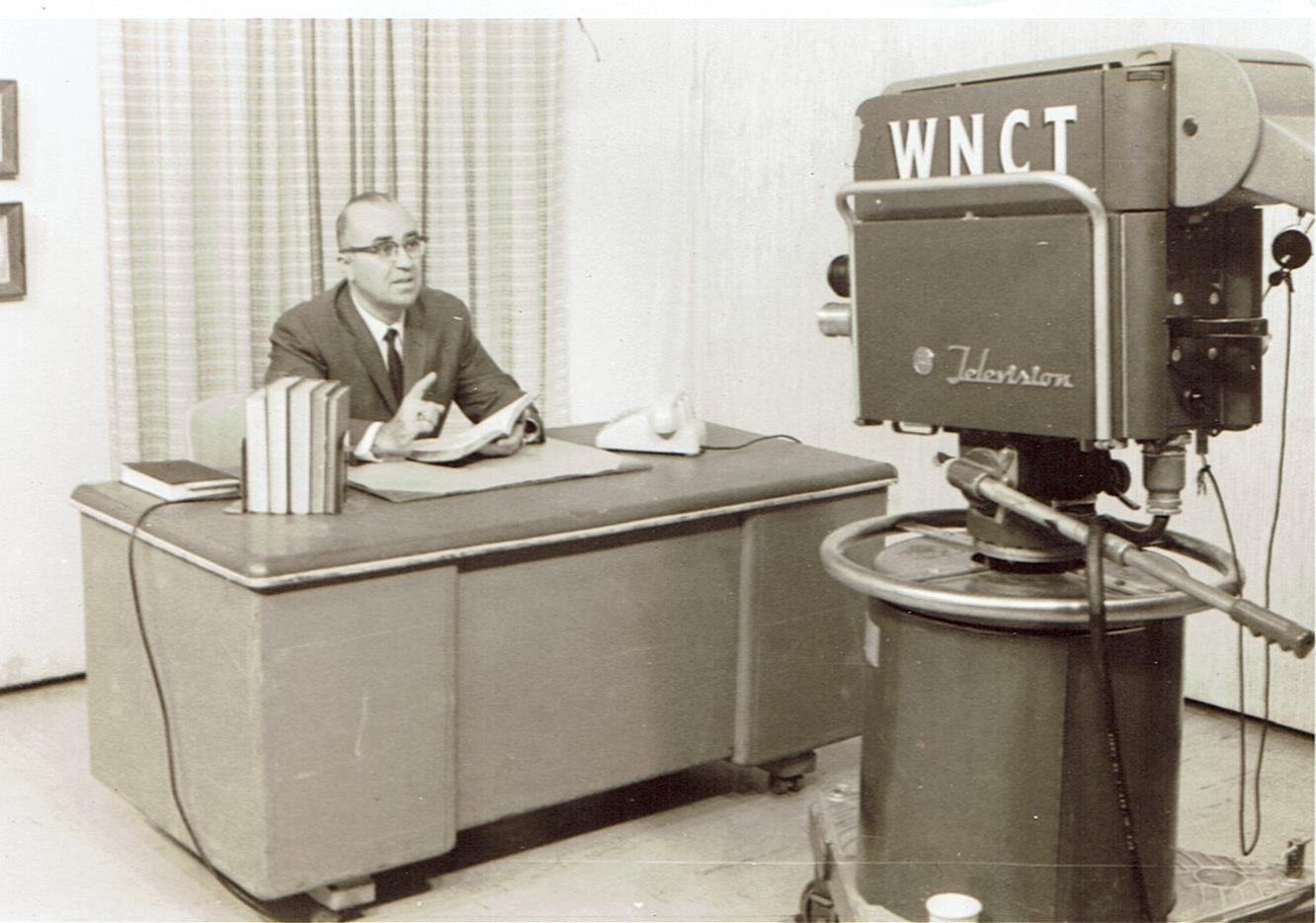
The Rev. William J. Hadden, Jr., on the set for his television program, Lessons for Learning, on WNCT-TV from 1961 to 1966.

Roy H. Park bought The Daily Reflector and WNCT in 1961, followed by WGTC radio in 1963. The radio stations changed their calls to WNCT-AM-FM by 1965, at which time the TV station added the "-TV" suffix to its callsign. The television station remained the flagship of Park Communications until it merged with Media General in 1997.

Logo prior to October 11, 2021

WNCT-TV served part of the Wilmington market (mostly Pender County) until that city got its own CBS affiliate, WJKA-TV, in 1984. When that outlet switched to Fox in 1994 and became WSFX-TV, WNCT resumed serving as the default CBS affiliate for parts of the Wilmington area until low-power WILM-LP (now WILM-LD) switched its affiliation to CBS in 2000. However, WNCT still served some parts of that area which could not obtain WILM's off-air signal and/or on cable until 2017 when WWAY acquired the CBS affiliation for its second digital subchannel.

The station's CBS high-definition signal was picked up by DirecTV on January 7, 2009, and this is also carried on Dish Network. WNCT's broadcasts became digital-only, effective June 12, 2009. On that date at 6:30 in the evening, the station signed off its analog signal for the final time.

== WNCT-DT2 ==
WNCT-DT2, branded Eastern North Carolina CW, is the CW Plus-affiliated second digital subchannel of WNCT-TV. It originally carried a full-time image of WNCT's Doppler weather radar. The current iteration of the channel launched on the network's first day of operation on September 18, 2006 (when The WB and UPN merged; WCTI-DT3 was the UPN affiliate, which was also shut down), replacing the market's former WB affiliate "WGWB", which had launched on September 21, 1998.

== News operation ==
Even before a full news department was established, WNCT offered weather forecasts to area farmers. For coverage of severe weather events such as hurricanes and floods, the station received a national Edward R. Murrow Award and was the smallest television station to get this recognition. It also won a Service to America Award.

In terms of ratings, Eastern North Carolina is usually not fiercely competitive during sweeps periods. Generally, WNCT trades the ratings crown with WITN and WCTI. In July 2008, this station became the area's most watched outlet after taking first place weeknights at 6 and 11. But since then, it has fallen to 3rd place weeknights at 6. As of May 2010, WITN has won the sign-on to sign-off honors for two consecutive ratings periods. The NBC station won all news time periods except for the weekday noon time slot.

In the late-1990s, WNCT began producing the market's original prime time newscast on Fox affiliate WFXI/WYDO (then owned by Piedmont Television) through a news share agreement. Known on-air as Fox News at 10, the broadcast could be seen every night for thirty minutes. Although it featured most of WNCT's on-air team, the show did maintain a separate news anchor. The outsourcing arrangement was terminated in December 2007 after WCTI became a sister station to WFXI/WYDO through their management by the Bonten Media Group.

Initially in January 2008, WCTI began repeating its nightly 6 o'clock newscast in the 10 o'clock time slot on WFXI/WYDO. Eventually, a new nightly prime time broadcast (produced by WCTI) was added to the Fox affiliate on January 28. Meanwhile, WNCT began airing a new newscast at 10 on its CW-affiliated subchannel. This program is currently known as 9 on Your Side at 10 on The CW and can be seen every night for a half-hour competing with the WFXI/WYDO broadcast (seen for an hour on weeknights, thirty minutes on weekends).

During weather forecast segments, the station features a live NOAA National Weather Service weather radar originating from the Local Forecast Office on Roberts Road in Newport (on-air, this is known as "Live VIPIR 9"). In addition to the main studios, WNCT operates a bureau in Jacksonville (on South Marine Boulevard/US 17 BUS). On October 17, 2013, WNCT became the area's third television outlet to upgrade news production to high definition behind WCTI and WITN. The station provides weather updates for WZGO-FM 91.1, WIKS-FM 101.9, WMGV-FM 103.3, and WNCT-FM 107.9.

== Subchannels ==
The station's signal is multiplexed:

Subchannels of WNCT-TV
Channel	Res.	Short name	Programming
9.1	1080i	WNCT-DT	CBS
9.2	720p	WNCTCW	The CW Plus
9.3	480i	REWIND	Rewind TV
9.4	480i	Mystery	Ion Mystery
