= WDZD =

WDZD may refer to:

- WDZD-LP, a low-power radio station (99.1 FM) licensed to serve Monroe, North Carolina, United States
- WLQB, a radio station (93.5 FM) licensed to serve Ocean Isle Beach, North Carolina, United States, which held the call sign WDZD from 1999 to 2005
- WILT (FM), a radio station (103.7 FM) licensed to serve Wrightsville Beach, North Carolina, United States, which held the call sign WDZD prior to 1994
