= WRHD =

- Farmville, North Carolina; United States
- Broadcast area: Greenville, North Carolina
- Frequency: 94.3 MHz (HD Radio)
- Branding: 94.3 The Game

Programming
- Format: Sports
- Subchannels: HD2: Simulcast of WNBU (Oldies)
- Affiliations: Fox Sports Radio

Ownership
- Owner: Inner Banks Media
- Sister stations: WRHT, WTIB, WNCT-FM, WNBU

History
- First air date: 1974; 52 years ago
- Former call signs: WRQR (1974–1996); WGPM (1996–2004); WWGL (2004–2005); WWNK (2005–2008); WTIB (2008–2010)

Technical information
- Licensing authority: FCC
- Facility ID: 26020
- Class: A
- ERP: 3,900 watts
- HAAT: 124 meters (407 ft)
- Translator: HD2: 102.7 W274CK (Winterville)

Links
- Public license information: Public file; LMS
- Webcast: Listen live
- Website: www.943thegame.com; HD2: www.groovinfm.com

WRHD (94.3 FM, "94.3 The Game") is a commercial radio station in Farmville, North Carolina. It is owned by Inner Banks Media and airs a sports radio format. WRHD carries programming from Fox Sports Radio and airs the syndicated Dan Patrick Show middays.

== History ==
In 1989, Henry Hinton started New East Communications of Greenville, North Carolina. The company's stations were WGPM 94.3, WCZI and WKQT. WKQT was sold in 1996. In 2003, Archway Broadcasting Group, LLC, bought WGPM and WCZI and announced its acquisition of four Greenville market stations--WRHT, WCBZ, WNBR and WZBR—from Eastern North Carolina Broadcasting Company, Inc for $6.5 Million.

This station was once called WRQR. Later, with the letters WWGL, together with WWEA (formerly WNBR), this was a country music station as "Eagle 94". Then WWEA became WWHA and WWGL became WWNK. The stations were "Hank FM". Inner Banks Media LLC Bought WWHA and WWNK as part of a cluster of stations from Archway for $4.5 million in March 2007. WWHA and WWNK were hot adult contemporary for a short time before switching to new letters and separate formats. WTIB moved to 103.7 FM on March 15, 2010, with WRHD taking the 94.3 frequency.

On August 11, 2014, WRHD flipped to sports talk as 94.3 The Game.

== HD Radio ==
WRHD-HD2 aired a variety hits format as "G97.9" early in 2016, and a soft adult contemporary format as "Easy 97.9". On November 20, 2016, the station switched to urban adult contemporary "Fresh 97.9" (relayed on FM translator W250CJ 97.9 FM Winterville). Russ Parr and Keith Sweat began airing on the station starting in January 2017.

On February 19, 2019, WRHD-HD2 changed their format from urban adult contemporary to a simulcast of oldies-formatted WNBU 94.1 FM Oriental, branded as "Groovin' Oldies 94.1 & 97.9".

Broadcast translator for WRHD-HD2
| Call sign | Frequency | City of license | FID | ERP (W) | Class | Transmitter coordinates | FCC info |
|---|---|---|---|---|---|---|---|
| W274CK | 102.7 FM | Winterville, North Carolina | 157178 | 250 | D | 35°36′26″N 77°28′4″W | LMS |
