= Double Shot (Of My Baby's Love) =

Single by Dick Holler and the Holidays
- B-side: "Yea-Boo"
- Released: 1963
- Genre: Rock and roll; rhythm & blues; garage rock
- Length: 1:57
- Label: Comet
- Songwriters: D. Smith; C. Vetter

Dick Holler and the Holidays singles chronology
"Mooba-Grooba / Hey Little Fool" (1962)	"Double Shot" (1963)	"Grand Strand Gold" (1998)

"Double Shot (Of My Baby's Love)" is a song first recorded by Dick Holler & the Holidays, written by Don Smith and Cyril Vetter. It was later recorded by the Swingin' Medallions who released it as their second single in 1966. Peaking at No. 17 on the U.S. Billboard Hot 100, the recording became a hit although banned on many radio stations due to lines referring to drinking and sex: "worst hangover I ever had" and "she loved me so hard".

The song has since been recorded by numerous artists, including the Residents, Joe Stampley, and the Cockroaches.

== Copyright ownership ==
In 1962, Cyril Vetter and Donald Smith cowrote "Double Shot (Of My Baby’s Love)" and assigned their copyright to Windsong Music Publishers. Decades later, Smith’s heirs and Vetter registered a renewal copyright in the song. Both parties agreed that Vetter’s assignment of the renewal term to Windsong was effective because he survived into the renewal term, whereas under Stewart v. Abend the Smith estate was ineligible because Smith had died before the beginning of the renewal term. Windsong therefore owned 50% of the renewal copyright, and Smith’s heirs held the other 50%. In August 2019, Windsong was acquired by Resnik Music Group, and the Smith heirs sold their interest to Vetter.

In 2022, the American Broadcasting Company contacted Vetter about licensing "Double Shot" for use in a television show that would be broadcast and streamed worldwide. Resnik Music Group claimed it still owned a partial interest in the song outside the United States, and that Vetter's copyright termination only applied within America. The dispute led Vetter to file a lawsuit in federal court to claim his worldwide ownership rights to the song.

In January 2026, the United States Court of Appeals for the Fifth Circuit ruled that Vetter could reclaim the worldwide publishing rights to "Double Shot" from Resnik. On March 20, 2026, Capitol Christian Music Group, Warner-Tamerlane Publishing, BMG Rights Management and Essential Music Publishing announced that they had acquired Resnik's remaining 25% stake in the song.

== List of versions ==
Year	Artist	Notes
1963	Dick Holler And The Holidays	
1963	Dale & Grace	
1966	Swingin' Medallions	
1966	The K-Otics	
1966	Harry Deal and the Galaxies	
1967	Clifford Curry And The C. C. Drivers	
1967	The Uniques	
1967	The Invaders	
1968	The Tams	
1974	The Residents	The Residents' first version, featured in a medley on The Third Reich 'n Roll.
1975	Harry Deal and the Galaxies	
1982	Joe Stampley	Joe Stampley was a member of The Uniques.
1982	Clifford Curry	
1983	Rick Dees	
1986	The Basement Wall	
1987	The Cockroaches	Peaked at number 32 on the Australian chart.
1988	The Highliners	
1988	The Residents	Their second use of the song, released as a single alongside God in Three Persons (on which the organ riff is a recurring motif).
1997	Dick Holler	
1999	George Thorogood	
2010	Dale & Grace	
2011	Better Than Ezra	
