= WWGL =

WWGL may refer to:

- WWGL-LP, a low-power radio station (97.9 FM) licensed to serve Steubenville, Ohio, United States
- WJCI, a radio station (102.9 FM) licensed to serve Huntington, Indiana, United States, which held the call sign WWGL from 2006 to 2007
- WRHD, a radio station (94.3 FM) licensed to serve Farmville, North Carolina, United States, which held the call sign from 2004 to 2005
- WWLV, a radio station (94.1 FM) licensed to serve Lexington, North Carolina, United States, which held the call sign WWGL from 1988 to 2000
