= Terry Cavaretta =

American aerialist

Terry Cavaretta a.k.a. Terry Cavaretta-St. Jules (born 1953) is an American aerialist. In 1977, she became the first woman to perform a quadruple somersault on flying trapeze. She is listed in the Guinness Book of Records for achieving the most triple somersaults. She was also the first aerialist to perform a triple back somersault with one and a half twists.

She was inducted into the Ring of Fame in 2009 and the International Circus Hall of Fame in 2014.

== Career ==
She initially gained prominence as a member of "The Flying Cavarettas," a teen trapeze group formed with sisters Kandy, Maureen, Molli, and brother Jimmy Cavaretta. The Flying Cavarettas gained widespread media attention in the 1960s and 70s, appearing on shows like The Ed Sullivan Show and The Hollywood Palace, and were recognized by Queen Elizabeth II following a performance in London. The siblings' athletic good looks and unique appeal as a teenage trapeze team garnered significant attention, with Cavaretta and brother Jimmy emerging as breakout stars of the day.

In 1968, The Flying Cavarettas began a multi-year engagement as the headliners at the newly opened Circus Circus hotel/casino in Las Vegas. After the group disbanded, Cavaretta performed with husband Roland "Ron" Eloy. Following his death, she reteamed with brother Jimmy, performing with him in Las Vegas and on tour until his 1990 retirement. In 2012, Cavaretta founded a trapeze school in Las Vegas.

== Personal ==
Cavaretta married trapeze catcher Roland "Ron" Eloy in 1971. Years after Eloy's death, she married Réjean St. Jules, a juggler, in 1983. Cavaretta and St. Jules have one son, Sebastian St. Jules (b. 2001).
