= WSME =

- Camp Lejeune, North Carolina; United States
- Broadcast area: Jacksonville, North Carolina
- Frequency: 1120 kHz
- Branding: Freedom 97.1 FM & 1120 AM

Programming
- Format: Oldies

Ownership
- Owner: Ashley Moseley and Harry Brown; (B&M Broadcasting LLC)

History
- First air date: September 8, 1980 (as WJIK at 1580)
- Former call signs: WJIK (1980–1986); WBQZ (2/1986-5/1986); WJIK (1986–1989); WWOF (1989–1996); WCTJ (1996–1998); WWJV (1998–1999); WSMO (1999–2003)
- Former frequencies: 1580 kHz (1980–2003)

Technical information
- Licensing authority: FCC
- Facility ID: 73697
- Class: D
- Power: 6,000 watts day 4,200 watts critical hours
- Transmitter coordinates: 34°43′3.6″N 77°16′55.8″W
- Translator: 97.1 W246CJ (Jacksonville)

Links
- Public license information: Public file; LMS
- Webcast: Listen live
- Website: www.wsme971.com

WSME (1120 AM) is an Eastern North Carolina radio station broadcasting an oldies format. The station is licensed to the town of Camp Lejeune, North Carolina, serving the Jacksonville area. The station is licensed to B&M Broadcasting LLC. WSME also simulcasts via an FM translator (W246CJ), at 97.1 FM.

"Freedom 97.1 and 1120", as the station is known, features pop music from the 1960s and 1970s, including rock and roll, soul, beach music and other classic hits of the era. The station was originally licensed to broadcast on 1580 AM.
