= Beach music =

Music genre

- Other names: Beach; Carolina beach music; beach pop
- Stylistic origins: Pop-soul; rhythm and blues; doo wop; country music; rock music
- Cultural origins: 1950s, the Carolinas and Georgia, United States

Other topics
- Carolina shag

Beach music, also known as Carolina beach music and beach pop, is a regional genre of music in the United States which developed from rock/R&B and pop music of the 1950s and 1960s. Beach music is most closely associated with the style of dance known as the shag, or the Carolina shag, which is also the official state dance of both North Carolina and South Carolina. Recordings with a 4/4 "blues shuffle" rhythmic structure and moderate-to-fast tempo are the most popular music for the shag, and the vast majority of the music in this genre fits that description.

Though primarily confined to a small regional fan base, specifically to "Grand Strand" communities such as Myrtle Beach, Carolina Beach, and the Golden Isles of Georgia, in its early days what is now known as Carolina beach music was instrumental in bringing about wider acceptance of soul music/R&B among the white music lovers on the south-east coast.

While the older styles of R&B have faded from popularity nationally, the Carolina shag has gained wide popularity in dance circles around the US. This has not generally led to increased appreciation for the music of the beach bands, however. Many of these new shag dance aficionados prefer the "R&B oldies" and/or shagging to currently popular tunes that happen to have the required beat. As more networking is being done on the Internet among shag deejays and beach music fans nationwide, however, there is a growing acceptance of the regional bands by the "new shaggers".

== History ==
=== Origins: 1950s ===
Historical accounts of beach music as it relates to the development of this dance are often conflicting, but most agree that the Ocean Drive section of North Myrtle Beach, South Carolina is where the beach/shag phenomenon had its greatest impact among vacationing teenagers and college students. The early development started around 1950.

In the period from roughly the end of World War II through the mid-1950s, many white youth in the still-segregated South could not always hear the compelling music of primarily black popular recording artists in their home towns. At the time, much of these recordings were characterized as "race music", a term later replaced by "R&B". In some communities, this remained in effect even after racial desegregation was implemented in the region. However, young people flocked to the bars and pavilions of the Carolina beaches where the shag was gaining popularity, R&B instrumentals by artists such as Earl Bostic ruled the jukeboxes, and the "beach clubs" where R&B artists performed live also thrived. Even though toward the end of the 1960s more and more such clubs with similar jukebox selections and live band performances opened in locations other than the beach resorts, the term "Beach Music" which began to emerge in the mid-1960s, keyed off of the memorable experiences of dancing the shag to this music at venues by the sea.

A major contributing influence upon this musical affinity beginning in the late 1950s was radio station WLAC in Nashville, Tennessee, which blanketed the Southeast with everything from R&B to blues and more. Stations with similar playlists began to emerge in the Carolinas and surrounding states throughout the late 1950s and the 1960s, increasing the popularity of the music across racial lines and contributing to the increasing popularity of the emerging new gospel-infused R&B sound, soul music.

=== 1960s–1970s ===
Among the most popular and influential R&B artists who produced "beach records" in the 1950s and 1960s were the Dominoes, the Drifters, the Clovers, Maurice Williams and the Zodiacs, the Tams, the Tymes, the Platters, the Temptations, the Four Tops, Brenton Wood, the Capitols, the Marvelows, The Swingin' Medallions, The Reflections, Clarence Carter, the Casinos, and the Chairmen of the Board. Beginning in the 1960s, pop soul records that had the right tempo came to be included within the beach music genre. Among the best-known examples are "It will Stand" by the Showmen, "So Much in Love" by the Tymes, "My Girl" by the Temptations (1965) and "Build Me Up Buttercup" by UK pop soul group the Foundations (1968). While some of the "beach hits" by these artists appeared on the R&B and rock and roll charts nationally, a great many of them were "B-sides"—or even more obscure recordings that never charted at all. With this penchant for obscure R&B, especially from the 1960s, beach music has much in common with the northern soul phenomenon in the UK, and perhaps even more with the popcorn sound in Belgium.

Another wave of artists, known today as the "beach bands" came into prominence in the mid-1960s to early 1970s, heavily influenced by the sound of Motown and the other prominent R&B labels of the day such as Atlantic Records, Stax, etc. These included the nationally-charting groups The Swingin' Medallions (South Carolina), The O'Kaysions (North Carolina), and Bill Deal and the Rhondels (Virginia). This wave of primarily white R&B artists was part of a strong but nationally short-lived musical trend known as blue-eyed soul. The Tymes gained UK hit "Ms Grace" in 1975. By the late 1970s, The Trammps, Tavares, and Jimmy Buffett were popular in the beach music scene.

=== Revival: 1980s ===
In the 1980s, beach music enjoyed a major revival in the Carolinas, thanks largely to the formation of a loose-knit organization known as The Society of Stranders (SOS). Originally intended as a relatively small social gathering of shag enthusiasts, "beach diggers" and former lifeguards meeting yearly in the Ocean Drive section of North Myrtle Beach, S.O.S. quickly grew to become a major Spring event. The Tams and Chairmen came back to Beach Music scene. Bertie Higgins recorded tropical country songs such as "Carolina Blue", "Palm Beach", and "Key Largo".

At around the same time, a fanzine called It Will Stand (from the song of that name by The Showmen) began to delve into the history of beach music. Concurrent with the new enthusiasm for the shag, and an increased emphasis on the roots of the music came a period of revival for many of the beach bands that had come to prominence in the 1960s. In addition to these groups, younger artists began to emerge, either as members of established groups, or with groups of their own. Dedicated beach music charts began to appear, tracking the musical tastes of shaggers and other aficionados of the genre. The number of regional radio stations playing beach music began to increase substantially.

In 1981, Virginia entrepreneur John Aragona sponsored "The First Annual Beach Music Awards" show at the Convention Center in Myrtle Beach. Video MC of this event was Linda Blair. In the late 1980s interest in Beach Music was revived and expanded. On November 19, 1988, live from Reynolds Coliseum, on the campus of North Carolina State University, "The Third Annual Beach Music Awards" was videotaped by Creative Center, a Los Angeles-based TV production company. The Awards show featured 20 of Beach music's stars and groups, ten Los Angeles based dancers, 20 professional shag dancers, and a twenty-piece back-up band, performing 50 of beach music hits. In 1987, O.C. Smith released new single "Brenda", written and produced by Charles Wallert. "Brenda" was on the Billboard R&B charts and the song reached #58 on R&B chart. "Brenda" was nominated for six Awards and won five at the Beach Music Awards. The telecasts of the Beach Music Awards in the 1990s (the footage appears in TV shows currently being broadcast) brought new awareness to the wide appeal of this music. Aragona spent more than 30 years promoting beach music.

These shows set the stage for the CAMMY Awards show, first held at Salisbury, North Carolina in 1995. The shows soon moved to Charlotte and then to North Myrtle Beach, South Carolina, where they are still an annual event under their new name, The Carolina Beach Music Awards (CBMA). The CAMMY (CBMA) show has turned into a five-day-long showcase and party for the fans and the bands, with shows all along the strip in NMB. It culminates in a show at the Alabama Theatre. Soul singer Chuck Jackson and William Bell were the national stars featured in 2009, backed by the Craig Woolard Band and the Band of Oz respectively.

== 1990s–present ==
In a related trend, since the year 2000, there has been a steady increase in the popularity of Southern Soul, led by such R&B labels as Ecko and Malaco. These labels feature both original and new artists of "the old school", and sometimes turn out recordings aimed specifically at the beach/shag market. An example of this is "I'm in a Beach Music Mood" by Rick Lawson. In addition, at least one dedicated Beach act, General Johnson and the Chairmen of the Board, charted both nationally and internationally with their brand of Southern Soul—sometimes with songs that were not aimed specifically at the beach and shag market, such as "Three Women". In 1994. General Johnson released a beach music version of The Ramones' punk anthem "Rockaway Beach" as a duet with Joey Ramone as part of the collection "Godchildren of Soul". In its October 15, 2010 edition, the New York Times obituary for General Johnson referred to "beach music" as an "upbeat brand of rhythm and blues".

Tropical country singer Jimmy Buffett cites beach music as a major influence. Buffett's follower Bob Baldwin(beach musician) delivered Buffett's-style vocal. The Landsharks performed Jimmy Buffett tribute show also. Buffett's CD Beach House on the Moon(1999) was intended as an homage to the genre. Though it featured The Tams, and for a while they toured with him as vocalists, the CD did not yield any tunes that were big hits with beach music fans. However, it may have been influential in popular country music. Since that release, there have been others by artists associated with Buffett that have had that "perfect shag beat" and a beach music feel to them. Some have become hits with shaggers, including "Drift Away" by Uncle Kracker, "Need You Now" by Lady Antebellum, "Bum Beach" by Josh Turner, "Some Beach" by Blake Shelton, and "Two Blue Chairs & You" by the Zac Brown Band. Alan Jackson & Jimmy Buffett, and Kenny Chesney ("No Shoes, No Shirt, No problems" 2003) gained hit on Hot country chart. Just as was the case with "Dancing, Shagging on the Boulevard" by Alabama in the 1990s, these country-flavored songs went over well on the dance floor regionally but did not please the more R&B oriented beach music fans. They did, however, impact the growing national "shag" dance scene to some degree.

Pop and rock artists have also contributed to beach music in recent years. Among the most notable are Rod Stewart, Delbert McClinton, Elton John, The Rolling Stones, The Eagles, Phil Collins, Kelly Clarkson, Pharrell Williams, Robin Thicke, Bruno Mars, Charlie Puth, and Justin Timberlake, all of whom have had records that performed well on the regional beach music charts. Boz Scaggs had a concert in North Carolina. Pablo Cruise and Little River Band performed at venues in coastal communities in the Southeast.

== Pop culture ==
Carolina beach music was featured on the soundtrack of Shag, a 1989 film starring Bridget Fonda and Phoebe Cates, filmed in part at the Myrtle Beach Pavilion and other Grand Strand locations. Though not an accurate portrayal, with the actresses' attempts at Upstate Carolina accents notable, many viewers consider it a "coming of age" movie, with a soundtrack and some shagging. Not widely popular in its initial release, Shag has become something of a cult film. It has helped to foster and maintain some interest beyond the Carolinas for beach and shag music.

The novel Beach Music (1995) by South Carolina author Pat Conroy takes its title from this regional genre of music. The novel's protagonist, Jack McCall, seeks to get his daughter, Leah, more in touch with her Southern roots. He does this by introducing her to the shag and to classic beach music. He describes the Drifters' song, "Save the Last Dance for Me" in this way: "This is your Mama's and my favorite song. We fell in love dancing to it." His brother, Dupree McCall, also tells Leah that "Carolina beach music is the holiest sound on earth."

== Radio airplay ==
=== Full-time beach music ===
Show station details
Station	Frequency	Branding	Location
WQFB-LP	97.3 FM	Surf 97.3	Flagler Beach, Florida
WNCT	1070 AM	Beach, Boogie, & Blues Radio	Greenville, North Carolina
WIKS-HD2 (W266AV)	101.1 FM	Beach, Boogie, & Blues Radio (Simulcast of WNCT)	Jacksonville, North Carolina
WSME (W246CJ)	1120 AM; 97.1 FM	Freedom 97.1	Jacksonville, North Carolina
WKTE	1090 AM	The Wave	King, North Carolina
WDZD-LP	99.1 FM	The Fun One - Classic Hits & Beach	Monroe, North Carolina
WIKS-HD2 (W239BC)	101.9 FM (HD2); 95.7 FM	Beach, Boogie, & Blues Radio (Simulcast of WNCT)	New Bern, North Carolina
WLWL	770 AM	770 The Big Wave	Rockingham, North Carolina
WIKS-HD2 (W290CB)	101.9 FM (HD2); 105.9 FM	Beach, Boogie, & Blues Radio (Simulcast of WNCT)	Winterville, North Carolina
WPCC (W252BH)	1410 AM; 96.5 FM	Large Time Network	Clinton, South Carolina
WRTH-LP	101.5 FM	Oldies 101.5	Greenville, South Carolina
WVCO	94.9 FM	94.9 The Surf	Loris/North Myrtle Beach, South Carolina
WFBS-LP	107.9 FM	Sunny 107.9	Salem, South Carolina

- Carolina Shag Radio (Channel 701), a channel on Sirius XM satellite radio
- Riptide Radio (webcaster).
- Beach Shag Rhythm & Blues Radio, (webcaster).
- SOS Radio, (webcaster)

=== Airs beach music part-time, or as part of a specialty show ===
- VL3PBS/106.7FM: Melbourne, Victoria, Australia
- WFJA/105.5 FM: Sanford, North Carolina
- WIOZ-FM/102.5 FM: Southern Pines, North Carolina
- WIZS/1450 AM: Henderson, North Carolina (simulcasts on FM translator W261DK/100.1 MHz)
- WKIX/850 AM: Raleigh, North Carolina (simulcasts on FM translator W228CZ/93.5 MHz)
- WKXB/99.9 FM: Wilmington, North Carolina
- WLON/1050 AM: Lincolnton, North Carolina (simulcasts on translator W298CK/107.5 MHz)
- WMTG-LP/88.1 FM: Mount Gilead, North Carolina
- WOHS/1390 AM: Shelby, North Carolina (simulcasts on FM translator W268CU/101.5 MHz)
- WOYS/106.5 FM: Carrabelle, Florida
- WRLY-LP/93.5 FM: Raleigh, North Carolina
- WNCT-FM/107.9 FM: Greenville, North Carolina
- WNNC/1230 AM; Newton-Conover, North Carolina
- WRBK/90.3 FM: Richburg, South Carolina
- WSGE/91.7 FM: Dallas, North Carolina
- WSWO-LP/97.3 FM: Huber Heights/Dayton, Ohio
- WYBO/92.9 FM: Waynesboro, Georgia
- WTRG/97.9 FM: Gaston, North Carolina
- WZMJ/93.1 FM: Lexington, South Carolina

== See also ==
- Doo-wop
- Northern soul
- R&B
- Soul music
- Surf music
