= Harry Deal and the Galaxies =

Harry Deal and the Galaxies is a rock and roll band formed in Taylorsville, North Carolina, United States, in 1959. They are most famous for playing a style of music known as beach music, which began in the 1940s in dance clubs of South Carolina beach towns such as Myrtle Beach.

== Career ==
The group was formed by brothers Harry and Jimmy Deal in the small southern town of Taylorsville, NC, where the band continues to perform over 50 years later. The band is synonymous with the term beach music, a style of rock and roll that started in the late 1940s in the dance clubs in the vicinity of Myrtle Beach on the coast of South Carolina. Their music is also associated with a type of dance known as "shagging," or the Carolina Shag. They first made their claim as the "Kings of Beach Music" during the 1960s at the Myrtle Beach Pavilion, which was at one time one of the most popular entertainment spots in the southeastern U.S.A.

After beach music hit its peak in the early 1970s, Harry and the band continued to perform and tour, adapting their music to the sounds of the times, while never leaving their beach roots far behind. Over the years, the Galaxies have expanded their repertoire to include modern rock and country music, but they continue to be known as pioneers of the beach music style.

The band forged on through the 1980s and 1990s, during which time Harry opened a performance center in his home town of Taylorsville. On in to the 2000s they still perform throughout the Carolinas with their latest lineup of "Galaxies."

Several members of the Deal family have played in the band through the years, including wife Geneva, son David and daughter Donna. Additionally, Harry and his brother Jimmy Deal built Galaxie III Recording Studio in the 1960s, where the band has recorded most of its music.

== Death ==
Harry Deal died on December 16, 2017, in Hickory, North Carolina.

== Discography ==
Singles/45s

- Salty Dog
- Smacky Mouth b/w Sad But True
- I Still Love You b/w You're Always on My Mind
- In Between The Lines b/w 50's Medley
- Miss Grace b/w Stay
- Fonky, Fonky b/w Everything is Everything
- 60 Minute Man
- Hey Baby b/w Comin on Slow
- This Love I Have b/w Walrus
- Bad Girl
- Don't You Just Know It
- Warm, Sunny Sunday
- I'm Up for Gettin' Down Tonight b/w The Little Girl Next Door
- She's Got it All together
- Summer Time Means Beach b/w Comin' On Slow

Albums/LPs

- At the Beach
- Vintage
- United
- I Feel Good All Over
- Harry Deal & the Galaxies
- "A New Day" Eclipse ECS 1002
