= WMJV =

- Grifton, North Carolina; United States
- Broadcast area: Greenville-New Bern-Jacksonville, North Carolina
- Frequency: 99.5 MHz
- Branding: 99.5/97.5 The Wave

Programming
- Format: Hot adult contemporary
- Affiliations: Westwood One

Ownership
- Owner: Curtis Media Group Inc.; (CMG Coastal Carolina, LLC)
- Sister stations: WIKS, WSFL-FM, WMGV, WNCT

History
- First air date: September 11, 1989 (as WVVY)
- Former call signs: WVVY (1988–1992); WTND (1992–1996); WXNR (1996–2022)

Technical information
- Licensing authority: FCC
- Facility ID: 64648
- Class: C2
- ERP: 16,500 watts
- HAAT: 257 meters (843 ft)
- Transmitter coordinates: 35°12′7.5″N 77°11′13.8″W
- Translator: 97.5 W248BS (Jacksonville)

Links
- Public license information: Public file; LMS
- Webcast: Listen live
- Website: www.995thewave.com

WMJV (99.5 FM) is a commercial radio station in Grifton, North Carolina, broadcasting to the Greenville-New Bern-Jacksonville, North Carolina area.

WMJV airs a hot adult contemporary format branded as "99.5/97.5 The Wave", along with translator W248BS in Jacksonville.

== History ==
WVVY played adult contemporary and then R&B music as "Wavvy 99.5" (with no rap) in 1988 through 1993. It switched to country music as WTND and was known as "Thunder Country" until 1996 when the call letters changed to WXNR and the name changed to "New Rock 99X". The station went through many station identities (e.g., Extreme Radio, New Rock, etc.) until 2006 when the name was changed to "99.5 The X" with the positioning statement "It Just Rocks".

In 2002, WXNR was left as the only Howard Stern affiliate in the Southeastern United States. At that time, the station taped the show and broadcast it in the evenings.

"The X" was an affiliate of Lex and Terry, which served as their morning show. Weekdays were hosted by Blando (10 am - 3 pm noon being the 90s Nooner) and Mick (3 pm -7 pm) on the afternoon show "The X Short Bus". Specialty programming included syndicated hard rock/metal show "Full Metal Jackie" Fridays from 10 pm - midnight, rock/hip-hop mix up show Skratch 'N Sniff on Saturdays from 11 pm - 1 am, and a local show on Sundays at 9 pm called "Local 99".

On February 2, 2017, Beasley Broadcast Group announced that it would sell its six stations and four translators in the Greenville-New Bern-Jacksonville market, including WXNR, to Curtis Media Group for $11 million to reduce the company's debt. The sale was completed on May 1, 2017.

On October 20, 2017, at 3 pm, after stunting for several hours with a loop of "It's the End of the World as We Know It (And I Feel Fine)" by R.E.M., WXNR flipped to Top 40 (CHR) as "Hot 99.5". The first song on Hot was "Unforgettable" by French Montana featuring Swae Lee.

On September 30, 2022, the call letters changed to WMJV. This was followed by a format change on October 19 to hot AC and a name change to "99.5/97.5 the Wave", utilizing programming from Westwood One's Hot AC feed. While the format was also carried by sister station WMGV, it would also free the latter station up to complete a move back to adult contemporary, completed the following Monday.

== Translator ==
Call sign	Frequency	City of license	FID	ERP (W)	Class	Transmitter coordinates	FCC info
W248BS	97.5 FM	Jacksonville, North Carolina	144987	250	D	34°45′21.6″N 77°23′4.2″W	LMS
