= WMBL (AM) =

Radio station in Morehead City, North Carolina (1947–2000)

Morehead City, North Carolina; United States
- Frequency: 740 kHz

Ownership
- Owner: Clear Channel Communications; (Citicasters Licenses, Inc.)

History
- First air date: July 29, 1947
- Last air date: February 2000
- Former call signs: WFTH (1980–1981)
- Call sign meaning: "Where Morehead Beaufort Link"

Technical information
- Facility ID: 73253
- Power: 1,000 watts (day); 14 watts (night)
- Transmitter coordinates: 34°44′9.6″N 76°48′54″W

WMBL (740 AM) was a radio station licensed to Morehead City, North Carolina, United States. Its call letters stood for "Where Morehead Beaufort Link".

The station went on the air in 1947. The entry for WMBL in a booklet from August 1957 to commemorate Morehead City's centennial states: the "radio station is heard from Maine to Florida, and has been heard all the way to Nebraska. Particularly, this is true during hurricane season, when friends and relatives at distant points want information on conditions in this locale."

WMBL was one of the few stations to play beach music in the 1950s and 1960s. A listener of the station noted that an afternoon deejay of that time, Bobbie Dennis, "was bold enough to play records by The Drifters, Clyde McPhatter and Big Joe Turner, to name a few."

A sister FM station using the WMBL-FM callsign went on the air in October 1972 at 95.9 MHz, later moving to 96.3). In 1986, the stations were acquired by Great American Media (now Curtis Media Group); they were part of the Great American Media group until the early 1990s.

WMBL-FM changed its call letters to WMBJ on October 13, 1981, according to Federal Communications Commission (FCC) records. On June 4, 1986, the station adopted its current call sign, WRHT-FM.

WMBL broadcast a popular standards format at "Unforgettable 740" in its last few years. The station was bought by a subsidiary of Clear Channel Worldwide and permanently taken silent in February 2000 to allow for WSCC, 730 in Charleston, South Carolina, to make an upgrade.
