= WZKT =

- Walnut Creek, North Carolina; United States
- Broadcast area: Kinston-Goldsboro
- Frequency: 97.7 MHz
- Branding: 97.7 Katie Country

Programming
- Language: English
- Format: Country

Ownership
- Owner: New Age Communications, Inc.

History
- First air date: September 15, 1976 (as WQDW)
- Former call signs: WQDW (1976–1990); WKCP (1990–1991); WQDW-FM (1991–1994); WZBR (1994–2004); WWNF (2004–2006); WKIX (2006–2008); WEQR (2008–2014)

Technical information
- Licensing authority: FCC
- Facility ID: 57610
- Class: A
- ERP: 2,650 watts
- HAAT: 52.8 meters (173 ft)
- Transmitter coordinates: 35°17′28″N 77°49′25″W

Links
- Public license information: Public file; LMS
- Website: curtismedia.com/katie-country website

WZKT (97.7 FM) is a radio station licensed to serve Walnut Creek, North Carolina, United States. The station, founded in 1976, is owned by New Age Communications, Inc.

WZKT broadcasts a country music format with an ERP of 2,650 watts.

== History ==
At one time, this frequency was home to WQDW, an urban contemporary station in Kinston, North Carolina, along with sister station WISP (1230 AM, now WLNR). In December 1986, Caravelle Broadcast Group Inc. completed its purchase of WSFL-FM and Kinston radio stations WISP and WQDW.

WZBR was a country music radio station owned by ABG North Carolina Inc.

"Kix Country" logo

In 2003, Archway Broadcasting Group, LLC, announced its acquisition of WZBR and three other Greenville market stations—WRHT, WCBZ, and WNBR—from Eastern North Carolina Broadcasting Company, Inc. for $6.5 million. Also that year, Archway bought WGPM and WCZI.

Archway announced May 25, 2004, that it was selling WWNF to Curtis Media Group.

During 2006–2008, this station was called "Kix Country 97.7" and it used the WKIX call letters. The station was assigned the WEQR call letters by the Federal Communications Commission on December 24, 2008. From late 2008 until 2010, Q97.7 was hot adult contemporary. In 2010, WEQR changed its format to CHR and changed its slogan to "The Best Songs On The Radio." Later, the slogan was changed to "Today's Hits." On October 27, 2014, WEQR changed their call letters to WZKT. On December 26, 2014 the station changed formats and 97-7 "Katie Country" was born.
