= Flagler Beach Historical Museum =

Museum

Coordinates: 29.4798°N 81.1276°W

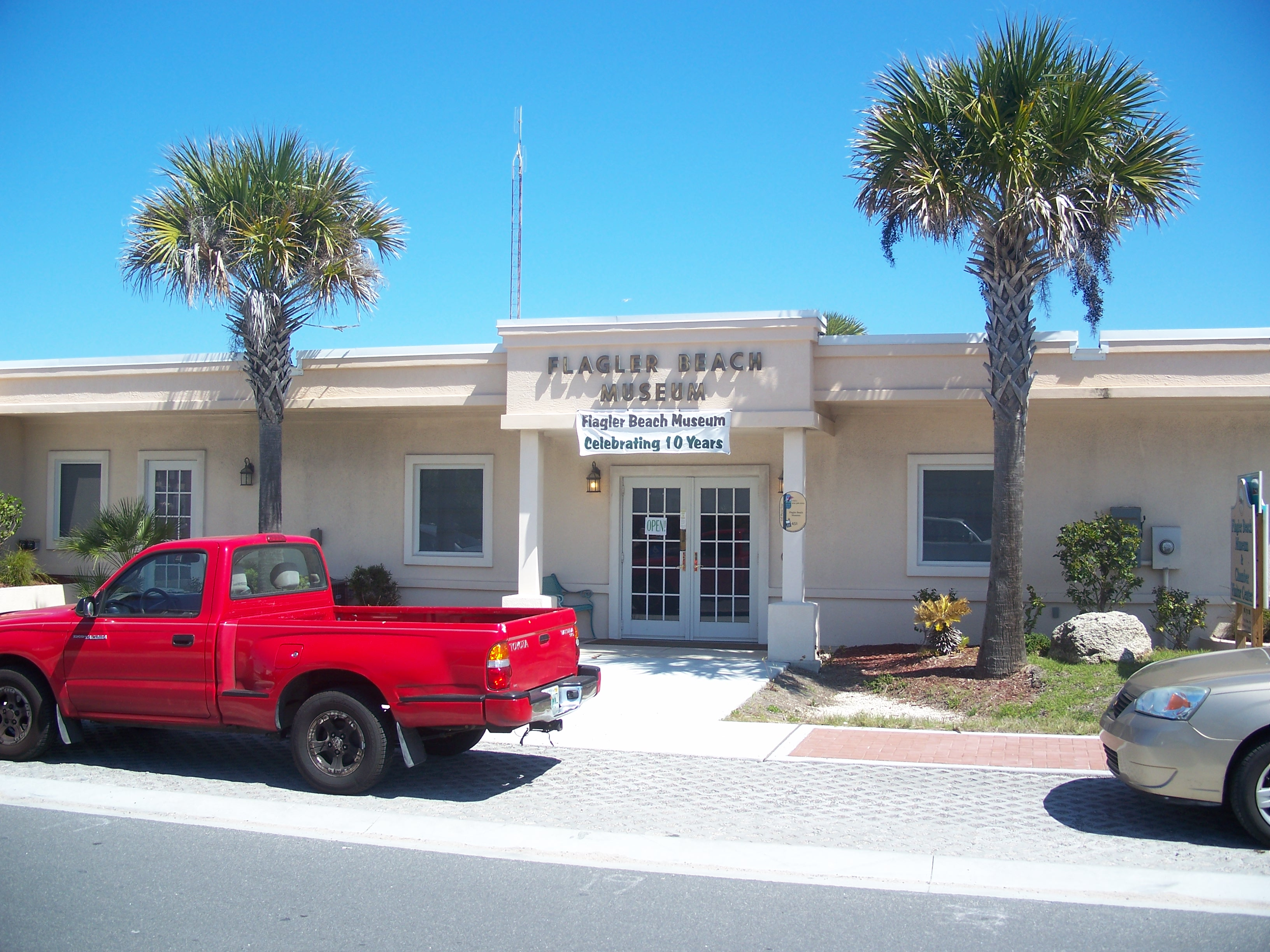

Flagler Beach Historical Museum is a local history and natural history museum located at 207 South Central Avenue in the heart of the historic seaside community of Flagler Beach, Florida, one block west of the fishing pier. The museum's permanent collection is dedicated to Florida history featuring Flagler Beach and Flagler County.

Their established collections range from pre-historic, Native American and colonial plantation artifacts, to images and items from the town’s roaring 1920’s and World War II encounters with German submarines. Their new Recent History displays feature local surfing legends, severe weather events, and critters and creatures that have paid them a visit. Walk in the footsteps of mastodons and mammoths, shipwrecked French sailors, Charles Lindbergh, and the founding families of “Ocean City.” They open daily from 10 a.m. to 4 p.m.! For more information call 386.517.2025, visit Facebook or FlaglerBeachMuseum.org.

The museum also houses the welcome center for the county tourism development office.
