= WNBU =

Coordinates: 35.001°N 76.832°W

- Oriental, North Carolina; United States
- Broadcast area: New Bern, North Carolina
- Frequency: 94.1 MHz
- Branding: Oldies 94.1 & 102.7

Programming
- Format: Oldies

Ownership
- Owner: Inner Banks Media
- Sister stations: WTIB, WRHT, WRHD, WNCT-FM

History
- First air date: 1993 (as WNBR)
- Former call signs: WZYH (1990–1992, CP); WNBR (1992–2004); WWEA (2004-05); WWHA (2005-07); WKOO (2007-09)

Technical information
- Licensing authority: FCC
- Facility ID: 13651
- Class: C2
- ERP: 11,000 watts
- HAAT: 148 meters (486 ft)
- Translator: See § Translators
- Repeater: 94.3 WRHD-HD2 (Farmville)

Links
- Public license information: Public file; LMS
- Webcast: Listen live
- Website: oldiesnc.com/

WNBU (94.1 FM) is a radio station broadcasting an oldies format. Licensed to Oriental, North Carolina, United States, the station serves the Greenville-New Bern-Jacksonville area. The station is currently owned by Inner Banks Media, LLC. The station has obtained a construction permit from the FCC for a power increase to 35,000 watts.

== History ==
With the call letters WNBR, the station was "Bear 94". Back in 1993 the station played 70s music. In 1998 the station played classic country.

In 2003, Archway Broadcasting Group, LLC announced its acquisition of WNBR and three other Greenville market stations: WRHT, WCBZ, and WZBR—from Eastern North Carolina Broadcasting Company, Inc. for $6.5 million. Also that year, Archway bought WGPM and WCZI.

Later the station switched to WWEA, and together with WWGL (94.3 FM, formerly WGPM), this was a country station known as "Eagle 94". Then WWEA became WWHA, and WWGL became WWNK. The stations were "Hank FM".

Inner Banks Media LLC bought WWHA and WWNK as part of a cluster of stations from Archway for $4.5 million in March 2007.

WWHA and WWNK were hot adult contemporary for a short time before switching to new letters and separate formats January 1, 2008. WWHA became oldies WKOO "Kool 94.1", using letters that two other area stations (now WRMR and WBKZ) had used for the same format. WWNK became WTIB and later moved to 103.7 FM.

On November 5, 2018, WNBU changed its format from talk, (which moved to WRHT (96.3 FM), to country, branded as "Thunder Country 94.1".

On March 1, 2019, WNBU changed its format from country to rhythmic oldies, branded as "Groovin' Oldies 94.1 & 97.9". The “Groovin” portion of the name has since been dropped.

Past Personalities & Present Dan Miller, Clark Willis, Michael Buscemi, Bill Cozart

== Translators ==
Broadcast translator for WRHD-HD2
Call sign	Frequency	City of license	FID	ERP (W)	Class	FCC info
W274CK	102.7 FM	Winterville, North Carolina	157178	250	D	LMS

== Previous logo ==
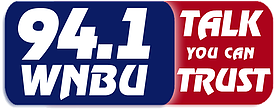
