= 13th Anniversary Show - Live In Holland =

Live album by the Residents featuring Snakefinger
- Released: 1987
- Genre: Experimental
- Length: 66 minutes
- Label: Torso
- Producer: Richard Zeilstra & the Cryptic Corporation

The Residents chronology
Stars & Hank Forever (1986)	13th Anniversary Show - Live In Holland (1987)	God in Three Persons (1988)

Snakefinger chronology
The 13th Anniversary Show Live in the U.S.A. (1986)	The 13th Anniversary Tour Live in the U.S.A.! (1986)	Philip Charles Lithman AKA Snakefinger (1993)

13th Anniversary Show - Live In Holland is a live album by the Residents featuring Snakefinger. Like The Eyeball Show album, this was not released by Ralph Records (the Residents' personal record label) but instead by Torso Records, which was the Residents European distributor at the time. In 2017 the album was pressed on vinyl by Secret Records.

== Reception ==
The album was negatively received by some, being considered a lazier, cheaper produced, version of their great earlier songs.

== Track listing ==
No.	Title	Length
1.	"Jailhouse Rock"
2.	"Where Is She?"
3.	"Picnic In The Jungle"
4.	"I Got Rhythm"
5.	"Passing The Bottle"
6.	"Monkey & Bunny"
7.	"This Is A Man's Man's Man's World"
8.	"Walter Westinghouse"
9.	"Easter Woman Guitar Solo"
10.	"Discomo"
11.	"Hello Skinny"
12.	"Constantinople"
13.	"Hop A Little"
14.	"Cry For The Fire"
15.	"Kamikaze Lady (Encore)"
Total length:		66:00
