= WZUP =

- Washington, North Carolina; United States
- Broadcast area: Greenville-New Bern
- Frequency: 97.5 MHz
- Branding: La Invasora

Programming
- Format: Regional Mexican

Ownership
- Owner: Media East, LLC

History
- First air date: 1989 (as WCZI at 98.3)
- Former call signs: WFXZ (1987–1988); WBRE-FM (1988–1989); WCZI (1989–2004); WMUM (2004–2005); WLGT (2005–2025)
- Former frequencies: 98.3 MHz (1989–2022)

Technical information
- Licensing authority: FCC
- Facility ID: 48399
- Class: A
- ERP: 1,350 watts
- HAAT: 149 meters (489 ft)
- Transmitter coordinates: 35°29′14″N 77°2′42″W

Links
- Public license information: Public file; LMS

WZUP (97.5 FM) is an American radio station licensed to Washington, North Carolina, United States. It serves the Greenville-New Bern area. The station is owned by Media East LLC.

== History ==
In 1989, Henry Hinton started New East Communications of Greenville, North Carolina. The company's stations were WCZI, WKQT, and WGPM. WCZI's programming was aired for a time on Cable Channel 7. WKQT was sold in 1996. In 2003, Archway Broadcasting Group, LLC, bought WGPM and WCZI, and announced its acquisition of four Greenville market stations—WRHT, WCBZ, WNBR and WZBR—from Eastern North Carolina Broadcasting Company, Inc. for $6.5 million.

WCZI was a news/talk station from 1994 to 2004. Later, the station used the call letters WMUM, calling itself "98.3 MOM, radio for women". Prior to switching to gospel in 2006, WLGT was “The Light”. In October 2007, it began simulcasting on WSTK (104.5 FM) and WEGG (710 AM). In May 2008 WLGT became “Glory Radio 98.3”. The format was “The Promise 98.3” from June 2008 through October 2010.

On October 1, 2010, WLGT went silent (off the air) for financial reasons. In their application to the Federal Communications Commission for special temporary authority to remain silent, the station asserted, "Operating expenses exceed income. The licensee intends to restore operation once economic conditions improve." On December 8, 2010, WLGT became “Big Fish FM” simulcasting on WBNK ("92.7 Big Fish FM") in Pine Knoll Shores, North Carolina. After several months off the air, WLGT returned to the air on April 1, 2011, at which time it switched to an urban gospel format branded as “We Love God Today Radio”. In October 2011, the station began simulcasting on WBOB-FM The Promise 107.3 in Enfield, North Carolina. On November 14, 2011, WLGT began simulcasting WSTK]. In April 2012 WLGT changed to Christian talk, calling itself “Your Christian Radio 98.3”. In July 2012 WLGT changed to “The Promise 98.3”. On November 1, 2012, WLGT changed to “98.3 The Bridge”, with a contemporary Christian format.

On June 1, 2022, WLGT began simulcasting on WSTK. Effective November 2, 2022, WLGT was licensed to change frequencies from 98.3 MHz to 97.5 MHz.

On May 1, 2024, WLGT and WSTK changed their format from contemporary Christian to worship music, branded as "Sozo Radio". On December 1, 2024, SOZO Radio went digital only and 97.5 and 104.5 began airing Christmas music as Eastern Carolina's Sounds of the Season. On December 30, 2024, WLGT and WSTK ended Christmas stunting and launched a classic country format, branded as "Classic Country 97.5 & 104.5". On April 20, 2025, they tweaked the format to include country through the 2020s and rebranded at HWY 975.

In July 2025, WLGT changed formats from classic country to Regional Mexican. It became WZUP that September.
