= Dick Holler =

American songwriter (born 1934)

Richard Louis Holler (born October 16, 1934) is an American songwriter, pianist, and performer, best known as the writer of the folk-pop standard "Abraham, Martin and John". The song has been recorded by numerous artists including Dion, Ray Charles, Bob Dylan, Kenny Rogers, Emmylou Harris, Andy Williams, Marvin Gaye, Whitney Houston, and Moms Mabley, among others.

== Biography ==
=== Early life ===
Holler was born in Indianapolis, Indiana, United States. He moved with his family to Baton Rouge, Louisiana in 1951, where he later graduated from University High School and attended Louisiana State University for five years. It was while attending LSU that he began to play piano and organize bands and writing songs with his college friends.

=== Career ===
Holler performed for two years on the local award-winning record rating TV teen show Hit or Miss along with movie critic Rex Reed and future actresses Donna Douglas and Elizabeth Ashley. During a January 1956 Teen Town Rally TV show he met musician brothers Ike, Tommy, and Jimmy Clanton. Holler was successful in signing the then under-aged guitar player and vocalist Jimmy Clanton to play with his band at that time, as well as Clanton's own neighborhood band, the Dixie Cats. In May 1956, the four-piece band of Holler on piano, Clanton on lead guitar, Mike Bankston on drums, and Ed Winston on tenor sax (with occasional bassist Leonard Root) was formed to play a four-night-a-week gig. A club owner later changed the band's name to Dick Holler and the Carousel Rockets, shortened to the Rockets.

The Rockets at times also included Mac "Dr. John" Rebennack, Grady Caldwell, Bobby Loveless (regional hit "Night Owl"), Jack Bunn, Junior Bergeron (Van Broussard band), Lenny Capello ("Cotton Candy", RIC Records), Bill Dunnam, Merlin Jones, Don Smith and Cyril Vetter (the writers of "Double Shot (Of My Baby's Love)", and others. Also sitting in at times was another Baton Rouge guitarist/vocalist/songwriter, Johnny Ramistella, later known as Johnny Rivers.

By 1957, the Rockets were recording at Cosimo Matassa’s Studio in New Orleans. Holler and Clanton each got recording deals on Johnny Vincent’s Ace label and the Rockets backed Clanton on his first release, "I Trusted You". Soon Jimmy Clanton embarked on a solo career, and Holler continued to front the Rockets until signed by Herald-Ember Records in 1961. Herald-Ember changed the band name to Dick Holler and the Holidays.

From August 1962 until May 1965, the Holidays were based and performed in and around Columbia, South Carolina. Their 1963 third single release, "Double Shot (Of My Baby's Love)", later become a hit in 1966 by the Swingin' Medallions.

Holler later disbanded the Holidays, and, at the urging of producer Phil Gernhard, rewrote one of his Baton Rouge songs as "Snoopy vs. the Red Baron". Recorded by Ocala, Florida, band the Royal Guardsmen in 1966 for Laurie Records, the song became an instant hit, peaking at number two in the U.S. and number eight in the UK Singles Chart.

In 1968, Dion (DiMucci)’s recording of Holler's composition in tribute to the fallen Bobby Kennedy, "Abraham, Martin and John" reached the Billboard Top Five becoming a folk-pop standard known worldwide. This song was considered of such significance that it was the first of twenty songs discussed in Songs Sung Red, White, and Blue: The Stories Behind America’s Best-Loved Patriotic Songs (ISBN 0060513047), a book by Ace Collins.

"Abraham, Martin and John" also received the BMI Four Million Airplay award.

=== Later years ===
In October 2007, at a performance in Baton Rouge, Dick Holler was inducted into The Louisiana Music Hall of Fame. Holler shares time between Switzerland and Georgia, U.S. He has had several releases enter the European top 5 and top 10. Each year, Holler returns to Baton Rouge for a one night reunion with his old friends and musicians at the Baton Rouge Eagles' Club.

== Discography ==
=== Albums ===
- Someday Soon (1970)

=== Singles ===
- "Living By The Gun" / "Uh Uh Baby" (1957)
- "King Kong" / "Girl Next Door" (1961)
- "Mooba-Grooba" / "Hey Little Fool" (1962)
- "Double Shot (Of My Baby's Love)" / "Yea-Boo" (1963)
- "Rock of Gibraltar" / "(Sum Sum) Summertime Kisses"
- "Shirley" / "I Want To Go Home" (1964)
- "Twist And Shout" / "He's Got the Whole World in His Hands" (1965)
