= WRHT =

Coordinates: 34.752°N 76.882°W

- Morehead City, North Carolina; United States
- Broadcast area: New Bern-Jacksonville; Eastern North Carolina
- Frequency: 96.3 MHz
- Branding: Talk 96.3 & 103.7

Programming
- Format: Talk radio
- Network: NCN News; Fox News Radio
- Affiliations: Premiere Networks; Westwood One

Ownership
- Owner: Henry Hinton; (Inner Banks Media, LLC)
- Sister stations: WNBU, WNCT-FM, WRHD, WTIB

History
- First air date: December 20, 1972; 53 years ago (as WMBL-FM at 95.9)
- Former call signs: WMBL-FM (1972–1981); WMBJ (1981–1986)
- Former frequencies: 95.9 MHz (1972–1990)
- Call sign meaning: "Hot" (former branding)

Technical information
- Licensing authority: FCC
- Facility ID: 18296
- Class: C1
- ERP: 100,000 watts
- HAAT: 150 meters (490 ft)

Links
- Public license information: Public file; LMS
- Webcast: Listen live
- Website: www.talk963.com

WRHT (96.3 FM) is a commercial radio station broadcasting a talk radio format. It is licensed to Morehead City, North Carolina, and it serves the New Bern and Jacksonville areas of Eastern North Carolina. It is owned by Inner Banks Media, with studios and offices on West Arlington Boulevard in Greenville. Most WRHT programming is simulcast with sister station WTIB (103.7 FM) in Williamston.

WRHT has an effective radiated power (ERP) of 100,000 watts, the maximum for most FM stations in the U.S. The transmitter is on Landfill Road at Hibbs Road in Newport.

== Programming ==
Weekday mornings on WRHT and WTIB begin with a local wake-up show, Talk of the Town with Henry Hinton and Patrick Johnson. (Hinton owns the stations.) In afternoon drive time, a local hour of talk airs at 5 p.m. with Tom & Bernie. The rest of the weekday schedule is nationally syndicated talk shows, including The Glenn Beck Radio Program, The Clay Travis and Buck Sexton Show, The Sean Hannity Show, The Mark Levin Show, The Dana Loesch Show and Coast to Coast AM with George Noory.

Weekends feature programs on health, money, guns, farming and religion. Weekend syndicated shows include The Chris Plante Show, The Weekend with Michael Brown, The Ben Ferguson Show and Gun Talk with Tom Gresham as well as repeats of weekday shows. Most hours begin with an update from NCN News, with reports from CBS News Radio.

== History ==
=== Early years ===
The station signed on the air on December 20, 1972. Its original call sign was WMBL-FM and the frequency was 95.9 MHz. It was the FM counterpart to WMBL (740 AM), both owned by Carteret Broadcasting. WMBL-FM was powered at 3,000 watts, a fraction of its current output. In their early years, the stations simulcast a full service, middle of the road (MOR) format of popular adult music, news and sports.

In 1981, WMBL-FM changed its call letters to WMBJ as "J-96" and later "Sunny 95.9". In the mid 1980s, WMBJ moved to 96.3 and became "Sunny 96.3". In the late 1980s, 96.3 changed its call sign to WRHT and became a Top 40 (CHR) music station as "96.3 The Hot FM".

In the early 2000s, WRHT/WCBZ were known as "Hot 96 and 103-7".

=== Ownership changes ===
In 2003, Archway Broadcasting Group, LLC, announced its acquisition of WRHT, WCBZ, and two other Greenville market stations--WNBR and WZBR—from Eastern North Carolina Broadcasting Company, Inc. The price tag was $6.5 million. Also that year, Archway bought WGPM and WCZI.

In January 2004, WCBZ changed its call sign to WRHD. That same year while under ownership of Archway Broadcasting, the station's studios moved to New Bern. In September 2005, both stations became "The HOT FM" again as part of their 15th Anniversary.

Inner Banks Media LLC bought WRHT and WRHD as part of a cluster of stations from Archway for $4.5 million in March 2007.

=== Thunder Country and adult contemporary ===
On April 25, 2007, HOT FM moved to the weaker frequencies of WWHA-FM 94.1 (formerly WNBR) in Oriental and WWNK-FM 94.3 (formerly WGPM) in Farmville. Both were the home of country "94 HANK-FM". The Country format moved to the stronger 96.3/103.7 frequencies. They became known as "Thunder Country". On March 15, 2010, WRHD and WTIB-FM traded frequencies and began simulcasting a talk radio format.

On May 3, 2010, WRHD split from the talk radio simulcast and changed its format to adult contemporary. The station was branded as "Star 94.3".

=== Talk radio ===
On November 5, 2018, WRHT ended its country format, which moved to WNBU 94.1 FM in Oriental. The new format was talk radio, branded as "New Talk 96.3".

WRHT was teamed with WTIB 103.7 FM in Williamston. The two co-owned stations, covering different sections of Eastern North Carolina, began simulcasting a mix of local talk in the morning and syndicated conservative talk the rest of the day.

=== Past personalities ===
Air personalities previously heard on the station include Grizz Lee, Miles Brooks, Charlie, Jenny Cruz, Chase, Dylan McKay, Chris Brooks, Mad Dawg, Jazz, Clark Willis, Heather Davis, and Cody.
