= Rick Lawson =

American soul, blues and R&B singer (born 1973)

Rick Lawson (born 1973) is an American soul, blues and R&B singer.

== Early life ==
He was born in 1973 in Raymond, Mississippi, U.S.

== Career ==
He began his singing career at the age of four as the lead vocalist for the W&W Jr. Spirituals in Raymond. When Lawson became an adult, he ventured into singing Southern blues and, in 1994, the Jackson Music Awards of Jackson, Mississippi, presented him with an award as the Most Outstanding New Artist of the Year.

During his career, Lawson has performed with B.B. King, Bobby "Blue" Bland, Johnnie Taylor and Tyrone Davis. Lawson is signed with Ecko Records of Memphis, Tennessee.
