= WFBS-LP =

- Salem, South Carolina; United States
- Broadcast area: Salem, Seneca, Walhalla and Clemson, South Carolina
- Frequency: 107.9 MHz
- Branding: Sunny 107.9

Programming
- Format: Oldies/Beach music

Ownership
- Owner: Salem Radio, Inc.

History
- First air date: March 2015

Technical information
- Licensing authority: FCC
- Facility ID: 194314
- Class: L1
- ERP: 16 watts
- HAAT: 75 meters (246 ft)
- Transmitter coordinates: 34°50′4.6″N 82°54′51.7″W

Links
- Public license information: LMS
- Webcast: Listen Live
- Website: wfbsfm.com

WFBS-LP (107.9 FM, branded on-air as Sunny 107.9) is an American low power FM radio station licensed to serve the community of Salem, South Carolina, United States. The non-commercial radio station programs an oldies format mixed with Carolina Beach Music. The station is locally owned by Salem Radio Inc. (no connection to Salem Media Group).

== History ==
WFBS-LP is notable for being one of several radio stations to suffer a foreign hijacking attack on their computer-based automation system, when attackers took over the frequency and aired a continuous loop of "F*** Donald Trump" by YG & Nipsey Hussle.
