= WIKS =

- New Bern, North Carolina; United States
- Broadcast area: New Bern; Greenville; Jacksonville; Kinston
- Frequency: 101.9 MHz (HD Radio)
- Branding: 101.9 Kiss FM

Programming
- Format: Mainstream Urban
- Subchannels: HD2: WNCT simulcast (Beach music)
- Affiliations: Premiere Networks

Ownership
- Owner: Curtis Media Group Inc.; (CMG Coastal Carolina, LLC)
- Sister stations: WMGV, WMJV, WSFL-FM, WNCT

History
- First air date: August 1977
- Call sign meaning: Variation of the branding "Kiss"

Technical information
- Licensing authority: FCC
- Facility ID: 72389
- Class: C1
- ERP: 100,000 watts
- HAAT: 299 meters
- Transmitter coordinates: 35°12′07.00″N 77°11′15.00″W
- Translator: HD2: See WNCT (AM) § Translators

Links
- Public license information: Public file; LMS
- Website: 1019online.com

WIKS (101.9 FM) is an mainstream urban-formatted broadcast radio station licensed to New Bern, North Carolina. The station is owned by Curtis Media Group. WIKS is an affiliate of the Steve Harvey Morning Show.

== History ==
The 101.9 FM frequency in New Bern signed on with an Album-oriented Rock format in August 1977 as WRBK ("K101"). Due to the nature of its frequency at 101.9 and the advent of digital tuners, the slogan was changed to "K102" in the summer of 1978. In August 1979, the station flipped to a country music format, as WAZZ ("Country Ways").

By 1986, the station would become "Kiss 102" with the WIKS call letters and an Mainstream Urban format. Transmitting power increased to 100,000 watts. Rap and hip-hop music was introduced in the 1990s, as WIKS became a full modern mainstream urban station by 1998. In 1997 WIKS picked up competition from the 92.3 frequency when WQSL adopted a rhythmic top 40 format as "The Beat of Carolina". WIKS responded by tweaking its format to Urban Adult Contemporary station in 2003, though they eventually returned to their current format.

On February 2, 2017, Beasley Media Group announced that it would sell its six stations and four translators in the Greenville-New Bern-Jacksonville market, including WIKS, to Curtis Media Group for $11 million to reduce the company's debt. The sale was completed on May 1, 2017.

== Translators ==
WIKS feeds low-powered FM translators, by way of their HD2 subchannel. "Beach, Boogie and Blues" features a beach music/rhythmic oldies format, originating from sister stations WELS-FM and WNCT.
