= Jimmy Cavaretta =

American aerialist

- Born: James Cavaretta
- Occupations: Aerialist; model; actor
- Years active: 1962–1990
- Known for: The Flying Cavarettas, The Flying Medallions
- Television: Ed Sullivan Show The Hollywood Palace The Dating Game
- Relatives: Terry Cavaretta
- Honours: Circus Ring of Fame

James "Jimmy" Cavaretta (born 1949) is an American circus performer, trapeze artist, actor, and model, best known for his work in the famed trapeze act The Flying Cavarettas, his regular television appearances in the 1960s and 1970s, and his performances as an original headliner at the Circus, Circus hotel and casino in Las Vegas, Nevada.

== Life and career ==
Cavaretta was born in 1949 into a family for their strong circus arts background. He began training in the circus arts in his early childhood and by the age of 15, he was performing in a trapeze act as catcher with his sisters Kandy, Maureen, Molli, and eventual Circus Hall of Fame inductee Terry Cavaretta. In 1968, The Flying Cavarettas became headliners at the newly opened Circus Circus hotel/casino in Las Vegas, marking the peak of their fame.

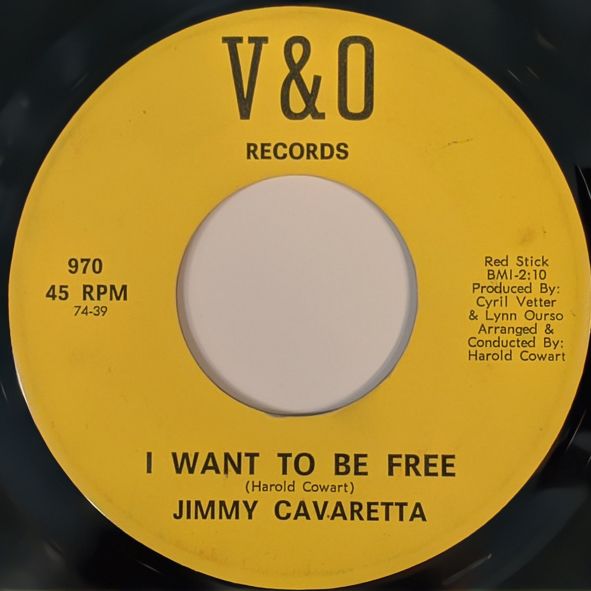
1966 musical single "I Want to be Free" performed by Jimmy Cavaretta

The Flying Cavarettas gained widespread media attention in the 1960s and 1970s, including appearances on popular television shows like The Ed Sullivan Show and The Hollywood Palace, and receiving personal praise from Queen Elizabeth II following a command performance in London. The siblings' good looks and unique appeal as a teenage trapeze team garnered significant attention from circus aficionados and the general public, and Cavaretta quickly emerged as a popular teen idol and pop cultural heartthrob of the day.

In 1968, The Flying Cavarettas became headliners at the newly opened Circus Circus hotel/casino in Las Vegas, marking the peak of their fame. When the family's act disbanded, Cavaretta worked as an aerial motorcyclist for Disney on Parade, toured with the Shrine Circus and Ringling Brothers/Barnum & Bailey Circus, and founded "The Flying Medallions" with his wife Judi, sister Maureen, and her husband Barry Mitchell.

Caravetta suffered serious injuries in 1970 after a 35-foot fall resulted in 85 fractures, but recuperated fully. He also appeared as one of the "bachelors' on The Dating Game and made brief forays into acting and modeling, appearing in films and posing fully nude for Playgirl as the magazine's January 1976 centerfold.

Following the death of Terry Cavaretta's husband in a plane crash in 1976, he returned to performing with his sister Terry. Their act continued to headline in Las Vegas and toured internationally. In 1984, the siblings won a Silver Clown Award at the International Circus Festival in Monte Carlo, presented by Cary Grant.

Cavaretta retired from performing in the late 1990s but remained active in the circus and Las Vegas' performer community.
