= WDZD-LP =

- Monroe, North Carolina; United States
- Frequencies: 99.1 & 94.3 MHz
- Branding: Fun One Radio 99.1 & 94.3

Programming
- Format: Oldies, Beach music

Ownership
- Owner: Shaggers, Inc.

History
- First air date: 2014

Technical information
- Licensing authority: FCC
- Facility ID: 195459
- Class: FL
- ERP: 67 watts
- HAAT: 44 meters
- Transmitter coordinates: 34°58′58.00″N 80°32′13.00″W
- Translator: (94.3 MHz) W232DI (Monroe)

Links
- Public license information: LMS
- Webcast: Listen Live
- Website: wdzdfm.org

WDZD-LP is a low-power radio station broadcasting an oldies/beach music format. Licensed to Monroe, North Carolina, United States, in the eastern suburbs of Charlotte, the station is part of a non-profit organization, Shaggers, Inc.
