= WNCT-FM =

- Greenville, North Carolina; United States
- Broadcast area: Eastern North Carolina - Greenville - New Bern - Jacksonville
- Frequency: 107.9 MHz
- Branding: 80s Hits & More

Programming
- Format: Classic Hits of the 1980s

Ownership
- Owner: Henry W. Hinton, Jr.; (Inner Banks Media, LLC)
- Sister stations: WNBU, WRHD, WRHT, WTIB

History
- First air date: December 22, 1963; 62 years ago
- Former call signs: WGTC-FM (CP 1963–1964)
- Former frequencies: 107.7 MHz (1963–1982)
- Call sign meaning: North Carolina Television (from former sister station WNCT-TV)

Technical information
- Licensing authority: FCC
- Facility ID: 54388
- Class: C
- ERP: 100,000 watts
- HAAT: 518 meters (1,699 ft)
- Transmitter coordinates: 35°21′55.6″N 77°23′36.9″W

Links
- Public license information: Public file; LMS
- Webcast: Listen Live
- Website: 1079wnct.com

WNCT-FM (107.9 FM) is a commercial radio station broadcasting a classic hits format, concentrating on the 1980s. Licensed to Greenville, North Carolina, the station serves the Greenville-New Bern-Jacksonville and Rocky Mount areas of Eastern North Carolina. It is owned by Henry W. Hinton, Jr., through licensee Inner Banks Media, with studios on West Arlington Boulevard in Greenville.

WNCT-FM has an effective radiated power (ERP) of 100,000 watts, the maximum for most FM stations. The transmitter is on a tower shared with WITN-TV off North Carolina Highway 118 in Grifton.

== History ==
=== Roy H. Park ===
In August 1963, Roy H. Park, owner of WNCT-TV channel 9 and Park Communications, decided to acquire radio stations to pair with his television station. He bought 1590 WGTC, Greenville's oldest radio station (now 1070 WNCT) and the construction permit for WGTC-FM. The FM station at the time was being built and had been assigned the call letters WGTC-FM. It signed on the air on December 22, 1963. It changed its call sign to WNCT-FM one month later.

Park specialized in beautiful music for his FM stations. WNCT-FM played quarter-hour sweeps of mostly instrumental cover versions of popular adult songs. Park Communications applied to move the FM station one notch up the dial to 107.9 FM in 1982. By the 1990s, the audience for easy listening stations was aging. In an effort to appeal to younger listeners, WNCT-FM gradually began increasing the ratio of soft vocals to instrumentals. Eventually, the instrumentals were dropped entirely and the station transitioned to soft adult contemporary. The format change occurred around the same time as the death of Roy H. Park. In early 1993, the station's moniker was "Easy 108". But with the elimination of instrumentals, the name was changed to "Lite 108" in late 1993.

=== Changes in ownership ===
The following year, management decided to end the soft AC format. WNCT-FM switched to oldies hits of the 1960s and 70s. The moniker "Oldies 107.9" went into place in 1994. The Beasley Broadcast Group acquired WNCT-AM-FM in the early 2000s.

On February 2, 2017, Beasley announced that it would sell its six stations and four translators in the Greenville-New Bern-Jacksonville radio market, including WNCT-FM, to the Curtis Media Group for $11 million. The sale was designed to reduce the company's debt. WNCT-FM was concurrently divested to Inner Banks Media to comply with FCC ownership limits. The sale was completed on May 1, 2017. Curtis Media continues to own former sister station 1070 WNCT.

=== AC and Classic Hits ===
Around 2022, WNCT-FM had evolved from classic hits to adult contemporary, calling itself "The Most Variety for The Workday". Artists included Adele, Bon Jovi, Michael Jackson, Madonna, Bruno Mars, Prince and Beyoncé, with specialty shows most weekends.

By the mid-2020s, WNCT-FM has returned to a classic hits sound, calling itself "80s Hits & More."
