= WMGV =

- Newport, North Carolina; United States
- Broadcast area: New Bern, North Carolina; Greenville, North Carolina; Jacksonville, North Carolina; Kinston, North Carolina
- Frequency: 103.3 MHz (HD Radio)
- Branding: Magic 103.3/95.5

Programming
- Format: Adult contemporary
- Affiliations: Premiere Networks

Ownership
- Owner: Curtis Media Group Inc.; (CMG Coastal Carolina, LLC)
- Sister stations: WIKS, WSFL-FM, WMJV, WNCT

History
- First air date: September 4, 1983 (as WZYC)
- Former call signs: WZYC (1982–1991); WKQT (1991–1996)
- Call sign meaning: "Magic V"

Technical information
- Licensing authority: FCC
- Facility ID: 48400
- Class: C1
- ERP: 100,000 watts
- HAAT: 299 meters (981 ft)
- Transmitter coordinates: 35°7′55.6″N 76°52′30.8″W
- Translator: 95.5 W238CF (Jacksonville)

Links
- Public license information: Public file; LMS
- Webcast: Listen live
- Website: www.magic1033.com

WMGV (103.3 FM, "Magic 103.3/95.5") is an adult contemporary music formatted radio station licensed to serve Newport, North Carolina. The station serves Eastern North Carolina with a mix of music from the 1980s, 1990s, 2000s and today.

== History ==
WMGV has been on the air since the early 1980s. Over the years it has been known as "V103.3", "Classy 103.3, "Kat 103.3", and, back in the 1980s, "Z103".

In 1989, Henry Hinton started New East Communications of Greenville, North Carolina. The company's stations were WKQT, WCZI, and WGPM. WKQT was sold in 1996.

On February 2, 2017, Beasley Media Group announced that it would sell its six stations and four translators in the Greenville-New Bern-Jacksonville, North Carolina market, including WMGV, to Curtis Media Group for $11 million to reduce the company's debt. The sale was completed on May 1, 2017.

On October 24, 2022, the station reverted back to adult contemporary as "Magic 103.3/95.5" (reflecting the addition of a simulcast on translator 95.5 W238CF in Jacksonville), a move that followed sister station WMJV taking on the station's previous hot adult contemporary format the previous week. Delilah was added in evenings, but the "V" airstaff was otherwise retained.

== Translator ==
Call sign	Frequency	City of license	FID	ERP (W)	HAAT	Class	Transmitter coordinates	FCC info
W238CF	95.5 FM	Jacksonville, North Carolina	139810	250	72.6 m (238 ft)	D	34°44′56.6″N 77°24′49.9″W	LMS
