= The Swingin' Medallions =

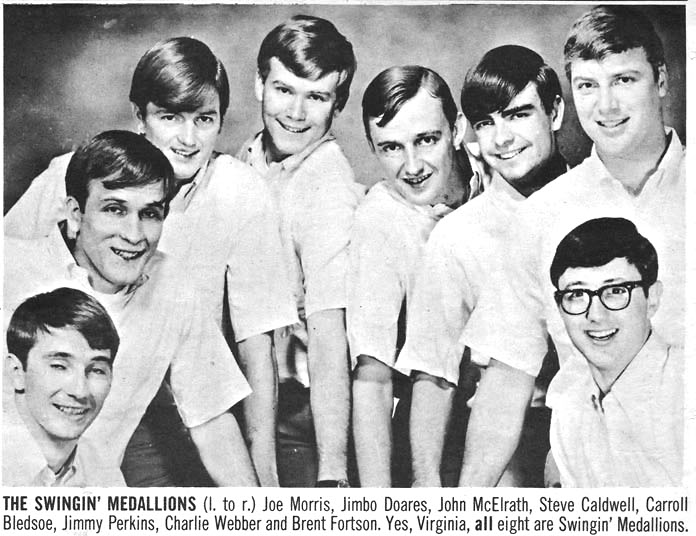
- Pictured in the July 16, 1966 issue of KRLA Beat

Background information
- Also known as: The Medallions (1962-1965)
- Origin: Greenwood, South Carolina, U.S.
- Genres: Beach, frat rock, rock, pop
- Years active: 1962–present
- Labels: Dot, 4 Sale, Smash, 123, EBS, Ripete
- Website: www.medallions.com

The Swingin' Medallions are an American beach music group from Greenwood, South Carolina, best known for their 1966 hit single "Double Shot (Of My Baby's Love)", which reached #17 on the Billboard charts.

== History ==
=== Early years ===
The band was formed as The Medallions in 1962 by John McElrath and Joe Morris while students at Lander College (today Lander University). The original lineup consisted of McElrath, Morris, Larry and Jimmy Roark (both cousins of McElrath), Bobby Crowder, Dwight Styron, and John Hancock. According to Morris, this group of friends "used to sit out in John’s front yard and listen to rhythm and blues music, coming from the back door of a local, little club there in Ninety Six. [...] That formed the type music we did." Soon, the band regularly rehearsed at Smokey Joe's Cafe in Ninety Six and added Carroll Bledsoe and Gary "Cubby" Culbertson on trumpet and guitar, respectively. Culbertson introduced "Double Shot (Of My Baby's Love)" to the band, but being in the Army Reserve as Vietnam was escalating, he soon departed and was replaced by Perrin Gleaton. By mid-1964, the Medallions' eight-piece lineup had solidified around McElrath on keyboards, Morris on drums, Gleaton on guitar, Bledsoe and Rick Godwin on trumpet, and Steve Caldwell, Brent Fortson (then still in high school), and Freddie Pugh on saxophone.

=== Popular residencies ===
Originally formed as a way to earn extra money by playing at clubs and fraternity parties, the band's energetic, brass-heavy live act soon developed a strong following in the Southeast. In the summer of 1964, Earl Caldwell, the father of saxophonist Steve Caldwell, offered the group a residency at The Old Hickory, his nightclub in Panama City, Florida, where they would play six nights per week. To advertise themselves, the band created posters and gave away free tickets to beachgoers. Reflecting on the band's blossoming popularity, Bledsoe stated: "The crowds in Panama City got so large that we had to start having a matinee show on Saturday and Sunday afternoons. People would pack the place, standing on tables to get a better view of the band. Many days they completely blocked out the sun." During this residency, the band met Dave "Rockin'" Roddy, a popular radio DJ on WSGN, who secured the group a weekly residency nicknamed "Medallion Mondays"; after finishing their Sunday night set at 2 a.m., the group would drive six hours to Birmingham to play at the Oporto Armory.

In 1965, the Medallions added "Swingin'" to their moniker to differentiate themselves from a Chicago band of the same name. That summer, the band continued their residencies in Panama City and Birmingham, however Jimbo Doares and Charlie Webber had replaced Gleaton and Pugh, respectively. By 1966, Jimmy Perkins had replaced Godwin on trumpet. Soon, Bill Lowery, a producer based in Atlanta, became interested in recording the young group, ultimately signing the group to a recording and management contract.

=== National success ===
"Even today, when I hear the Swingin’ Medallions sing ‘Double Shot of My Baby’s Love,’ it makes me want to stand outside in the hot sun with a milkshake cup full of beer in one hand and a slightly drenched 19-year-old coed in the other."

— Lewis Grizzard in 1993

Their first single, "I Wanna Be Your Guy", was inadvertently released under the name, "Swinging Medallions" instead of "Swingin' Medallions". Released on Dot Records, it did not chart. "Double Shot (Of My Baby's Love)", written by Don Smith and Cyril Vetter and originally recorded by Dick Holler and the Holidays, was a popular staple in the band's live setlist, yet they initially had difficulty transferring the "party atmosphere" of the live setting to a studio recording. As bandleader McElrath described the situation, "They kept trying to have us record it with different arrangements and in different ways with horns and so forth that didn’t fit the song." McElrath wrote the track's distinctive Farfisa organ riff. Eventually, the band grew discontent with Lowery's production and went to Arthur Smith Studios in Charlotte, North Carolina to continue recording. To imitate the raucous energy of their live shows, the band brought in a "big crowd" of random people from off the street to "make background noise." The single's B-Side, an instrumental entitled "Here It Comes Again," was written by band members John McElrath and Joe Morris. According to drummer Joe Morris, the two tracks took an hour and a half to satisfactorily record.

500 copies of this new, "rowdier" arrangement were printed on the For Sale label (created by the band themselves), then sold at shows and distributed to radio stations. Allegedly, James Brown recommended the band to his then-record label Smash Records, which promptly purchased the single after Lowery agreed. Though quickly becoming a hit in the Southeast, Smash Records required the band to re-record the vocals with censored lyrics before distributing the single nationally. Lines that referenced sex and alcohol consumption, such as "She loved me so long, and she loved me so hard" and "The worst hangover that I ever had" became "She kissed me so long, and she kissed me so hard" and "The worst morning after that I ever had." WIST radio jock Tom Gauger was called in to re-mix for release on Smash. The single reached No. 17 in the U.S. Billboard Hot 100 in 1966, staying on the charts for 23 consecutive weeks and selling over a million copies. Riding on this success, their debut album Double Shot (Of My Baby's Love) was propelled to No. 88 on the Billboard 200.

"It is difficult to categorize the sound of the Medallions by instrumentation since their versatility is remarkable. Unlike most of today's groups, they do not rely on guitars alone, but utilize a variety of instruments, including three saxophones, an electric piano, organ and flute — with one lonely guitar."

— KRLA Beat, July 16, 1966

With this newfound popularity, the band embarked on a tour managed by Leonard Stogel that saw them visit 34 states in three months' time. The band also performed on Dick Clark's Where The Action Is, being featured in the episode that aired on July 15, 1966. While in California, the band performed at Tina Sinatra's eighteenth birthday party and were later gifted two new amplifiers by her father. After touring the West Coast, the group performed in Atlanta (opening for James Brown), Richmond (opening for Mitch Ryder and The Detroit Wheels and The Dave Clark Five), New York City, and finally New England. Afterwards, the band headlined various concerts in the Southeast, being supported by Napoleon XIV and Sam the Sham and the Pharaohs.

=== Later activities ===
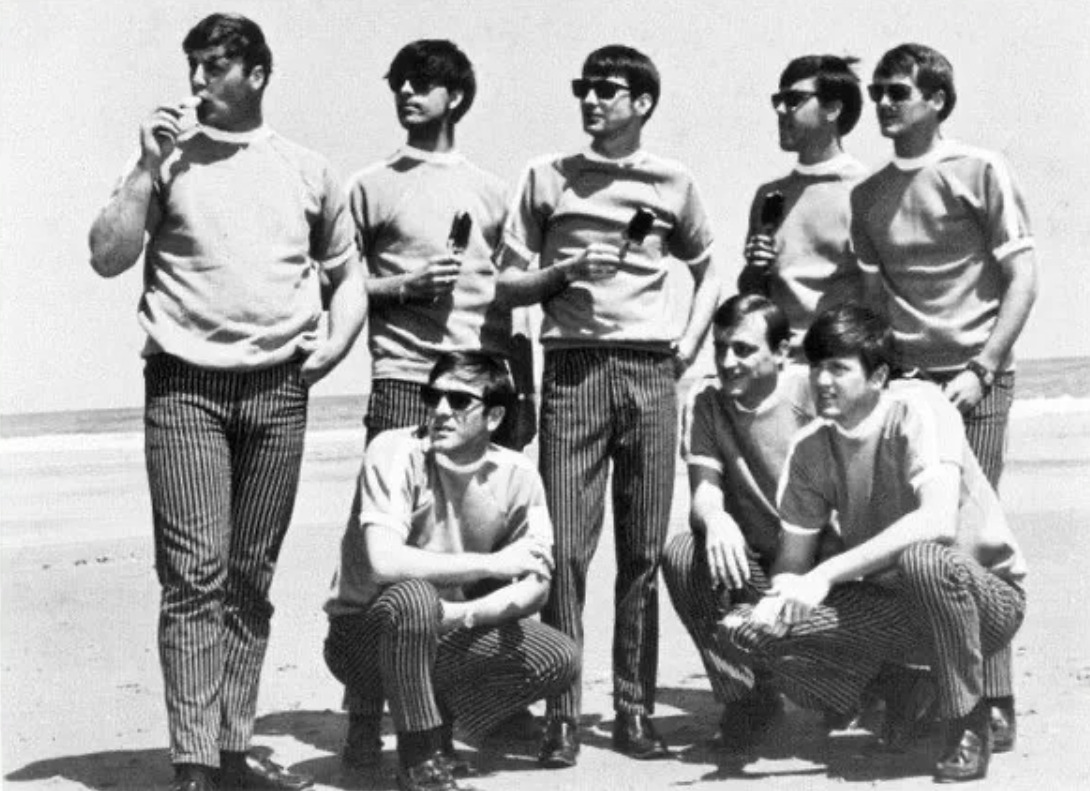
The Swingin' Medallions in 1967

The follow-up single "She Drives Me Out of My Mind", written by future Raider Freddy Weller and with a sound highly derivative of their previous hit, stalled at No. 71, making it the group's last-ever nationally-charting single. Nevertheless, the band continued to be popular in the live circuit.

In late 1966, Brent Fortson and Steve Caldwell left the band and were replaced by Johnny Cox and James "Hack" Bartley.

The Swingin' Medallions were featured in the 1968 film Mondo Daytona.

The band (with a shifting cast) continued to do reunion shows into the 2000s. On September 16, 2009, the band joined Bruce Springsteen & the E Street Band during their concert at the Bi-Lo Center in Greenville, South Carolina for a performance of "Double Shot (Of My Baby's Love)".

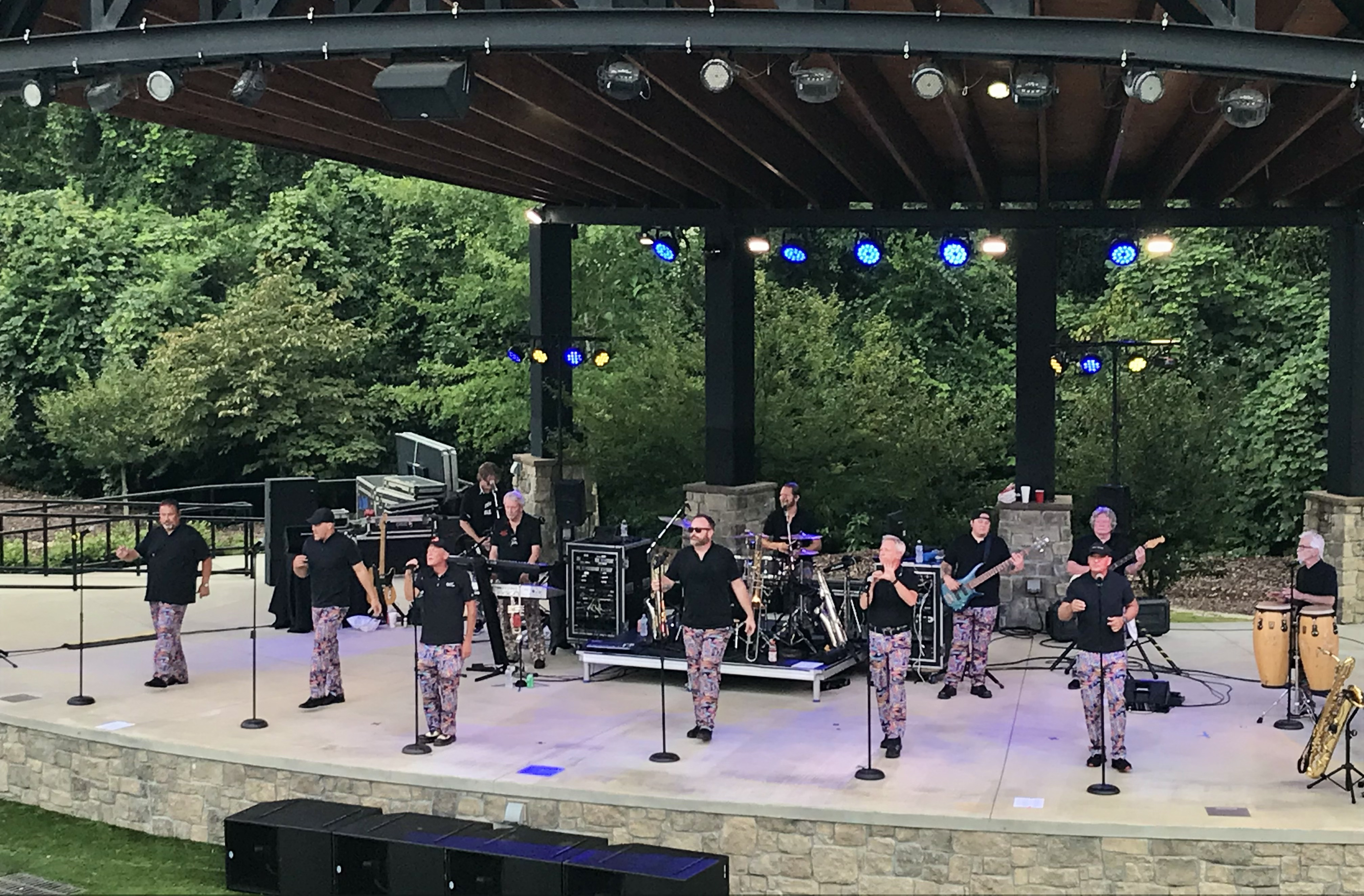
The Swingin' Medallions performing at the Icehouse Amphitheater in Lexington, South Carolina in 2025. Founding member Joe Morris is fifth from the left, playing keyboard

=== McElrath's legacy and death ===
In 2008, John McElrath was awarded the Order of the Palmetto by South Carolina governor Mark Sanford. John McElrath died of Parkinson's disease on June 9, 2018, at age 77. Brent Fortson, who was still underage when he joined the group in 1964, said that "[McElrath] was my mentor. He was my biggest influence as a calming figure. [...] We were so fortunate to have him lead the way. He was a trailblazer." Ex-member Grainger Hines also gave words of praise: "A lot of people think entertainment is all fun and games but it is a business. John knew this and the longevity of the Swingin’ Medallions, which extends over fifty years, is a true tribute to John McElrath."

In 2025, a joint resolution between the South Carolina House of Representatives and Senate passed to rename a portion of South Carolina Highway 34 connecting Greenwood and Ninety Six the John McElrath Memorial Highway.

=== Other band member deaths ===
Steve Caldwell died of pancreatic cancer on January 28, 2002. Charlie Webber died of cancer on January 17, 2003. Gary "Cubby" Culbertson died on March 27, 2014. James "Hack" Bartley died on April 19, 2016 from accidental drowning while fishing. Jimbo Doares (born James Woodrow Doares, Jr. in Columbia, South Carolina on August 14, 1944) died on September 7, 2022, at age 78.

== Band members ==
=== Original members ===
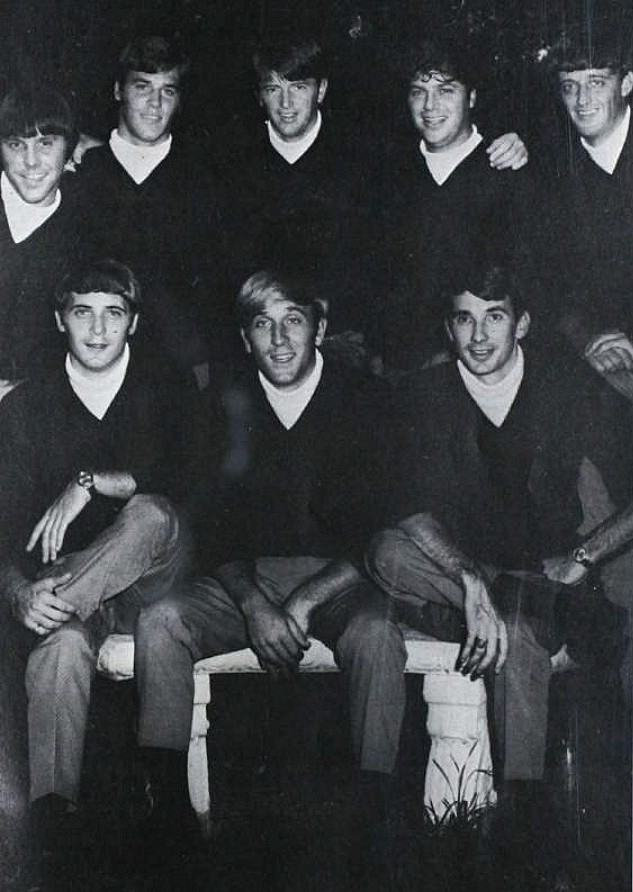
The Swingin' Medallions in 1968

- John McElrath – keyboards (died 2018)
- Jimbo Doares – guitar (died 2022)
- Carroll Bledsoe – trumpet
- Charles Webber – trumpet (died 2003)
- Fredie Pugh – saxophone
- Brent Fortson – saxophone, flute
- Jimmy Perkins – bass guitar
- Joe Morris – drums
- Perrin Gleaton – lead guitar
- Roy Davenport – guitar, vocals

=== Current lineup ===
Per the band's website, the current lineup consists of:

- Shawn McElrath – saxophone, bass, flute, vocals (1983-present)
- Shane McElrath – keyboards, alto saxophone, guitar, vocals (1986-present)
- Chris Crowe – baritone saxophone, vocals (1996-2003, 2011-present)
- Josh Snelling – trumpet, vocals (2006-present)
- John Smith Buchan – trumpet, trombone, bass, vocals (2009-2011, 2015-present)
- Richard Loper – trumpet, vocals (1986-2002, 2017-present)
- Marcus Gullen – drums, vocals (2023-present)
- Ronnie "R.G." Goldman – guitar, bass (2019-present, off-and-on since approx. 1980)
- Mackenzie Walden – bass, guitar (2022-present)
- Joe Morris – drums (1962-present, occasional performances)

Drummer Joe Morris is the only original member who still tours with the group. Shawn and Shane McElrath are, respectively, the oldest and youngest sons of original frontman John McElrath. John Smith Buchan, likewise, is a nephew of John McElrath.

== Discography ==
Albums

- Double Shot (Of My Baby's Love) (Smash/Mercury MGS-27083/SRS-67083, 1966)
- Sun Sand and Sea (4 Sale DRP-7775, 1981)
- It's All Right
- Get U Some (USB Records, 1993)
- Original Coors Beach Party No. 1 (Medallion, 1998)
- Original Coors Beach Party No. 2 (Medallion, 2000)
- Christmas Party (2001)
- Round & Round (2003) (as Three Medallions)
- Generations (2004)

Compilations

- Anthology (Ripete 5145, 1997)

Singles

- "Bye Bye, Silly Girl"/"I Want To Be Your Guy" (Dot 16721, 1965)
- "Double Shot (Of My Baby's Love)"/"Here It Comes Again" (4 Sale 002, 1965)
- "Double Shot (Of My Baby's Love)"/"Here It Comes Again" (Smash 2033, 1966)
- "She Drives Me Out Of My Mind"/"You Gotta Have Faith" (Smash 2050, 1966)
- "I Don't Want To Lose You Baby"/"Night Owl" (Smash 2075, 1966)
- "I Found A Rainbow"/"Don't Cry No More" (Smash 2084, 1967)
- "Turn On The Music"/"Summer's Not The Same This Year" (Smash 2107, 1967)
- "Where Can I Go To Get Soul"/"Bow And Arrow" (Smash 2129, 1967)
- "Hey, Hey, Baby"/"Sun, Sand, And Sea" (Capitol 2338, 1968)
- "We're Gonna Hate Ourselves In The Morning"/"It's Alright (You're Just In Love)" (123 Records 1723, 1970)
- "Rollin' Rovin' River"/"Don't Let Your Feet Touch The Ground" (123 Records 1732, 1970)
- "I'm Gonna Make Her Mine"/"Barefootin'" (EBS 062085, 1985)
- "Hit Me With Them Horns" (Medallion Productions, 2025)

Reissue singles

- "Baby Talk" (Jan and Dean)/"Double Shot Of My Baby's Love" (Collectables 3102)
- "Mendocino" (Sir Douglas Quintet)/"Double Shot (Of My Baby's Love)" (Smash 1421)
- "Polk Salad Annie" (Tony Joe White)/"Double Shot (Of My Baby's Love)" (Ripete 128)
- "She Drives Me Out Of My Mind"/"Hey Hey Baby" (Ripete 143)
