= The Flying Cavarettas =

Famous world-champion aerialist act/performers

The Flying Cavarettas were an American aerialist act that gained widespread popularity in the 1960s and 1970s for their acrobatic performances and international tour and media appearances. Initially composed of teenaged siblings, the team, inducted into the Circus Ring of Fame in 2009, is best known for its role in popularizing acrobatic and circus shows on the Las Vegas Strip, the brief pop cultural notoriety of catcher Jimmy Cavaretta, and the athletic accomplishments of lead flyer, Guinness World Record-holder Terry Cavaretta.

== History ==
"The Flying Cavarettas" originated in the early 1964 when Jimmy Cavaretta began performing trapeze acts with his younger sister Terry, then the youngest professional trapeze artist in the world.

Training in St. Petersburg, Florida, in municipal facilities, at times with circus greats Faye Moses and Fay Alexander, sisters Candace (Kandy), Maureen (Moe), and Marlene (Molli) were added to the act in 1964, and the team began touring and competing with a double cross-over aerial and trampoline act, featuring young Terry as primary flyer.

The group's unique composition as an all-teenage, primarily female, aerialist acrobatics team attracted increasing public attention, and the siblings were soon making regular television appearances on popular variety shows of the day, including The Pat Boone Show, The Ed Sullivan Show, and The Hollywood Palace, and competing internationally, including in London, where they participated in a command performance for Queen Elizabeth II.

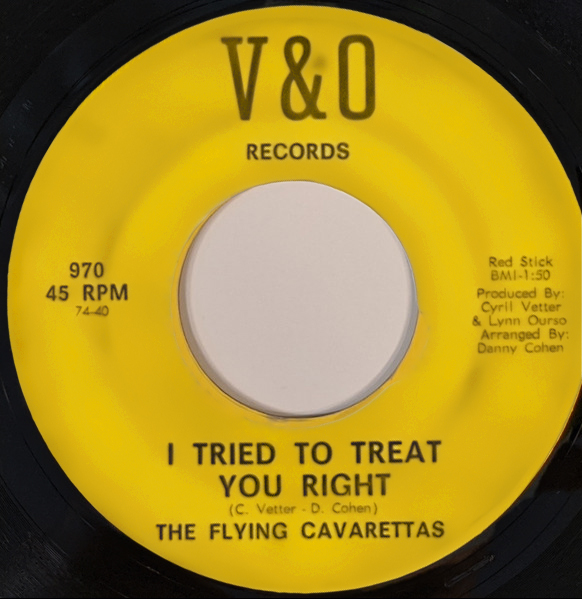
1966 musical single "I Tried to Treat You Right" performed by The Flying Cavarettas

Their popularity led to professional forays beyond their acrobatic niche, with Jimmy, in particular, emerging as a teen idol. In 1966, "The Flying Cavarettas" released a pop single, "I Tried to Treat You Right", on V&O records, paired with "I Want to be Free", a solo effort by Jimmy.

=== Peak years and disbandment ===
In 1968, "The Flying Cavarettas" began a multiyear engagement as headliners at the newly opened Circus Circus hotel/casino in Las Vegas, becoming the first acrobatic act to headline a dedicated circus show on the Las Vegas Strip. During this time, the group continued to make tour appearances and remained popular media guests, with the now young adult siblings often positioned as role models of fitness and athleticism, and appearing as "eligible bachelorettes" (or, in Jimmy's case, bachelor) on The Dating Game. Also during this period, Terry's aerial achievements both individually and with the group continued to establish a reputation as one of the world's premiere aerialists.

In 1970, Jimmy suffered 85 bone fractures after falling 35-feet mid-performance in Kansas City, Missouri. Though he fully recovered, the accident left him desirous of a slower pace for a time. After the team's initial residency at Circus, Circus ended in 1973, the act, as originally constructed, disbanded.

=== Later years and reunion ===
The Cavaretta siblings continued to perform in various configurations (including with spouses and others) at Circus Circus, toured, and competed internationally, while pursuing other interests and opportunities. Jimmy briefly joined Disney on Parade as an aerial motorcyclist before returning to acrobatics with "The Flying Medallions", a group he co-founded with sister Maureen, wife Judi, and Maureen's husband Barry Mitchell. He also toured with the Shrine Circus and Ringling Brothers/Barnum & Bailey Circus, appeared in small film roles, and posed fully nude for Playgirl as their centerfold in January 1976.

Terry formed "The Flying Terrells" duo with her husband, Roland "Ron" Eloy Lemus, as catcher, before reuniting with her siblings professionally following Lemus's death in a 1976 plane crash. After performing in various configurations as both "The Flying Medallions" and "The Flying Terrells", the siblings eventually resumed the exclusive use of "The Flying Caravettas", touring widely and performing in Las Vegas (both at Circus Circus, and, later, as part of the Folies Bergère at the Tropicana casino and resort, where Jimmy and Terry performed as a duo).

In 1977, the siblings won the Circus World Championship in London, and 1984, won the Silver Clown Award at the International Circus Festival in Monte Carlo, presented by Cary Grant.

=== Legacy ===
"The Flying Cavarettas" are best remembered for their role in popularizing trapeze acts among a broader audience, particularly in Las Vegas, where acrobatic circus shows, such as those produced by Cirque du Soleil, now make up the bulk of headline offerings on the Las Vegas Strip. In various iterations, "The Flying Cavarettas" performed at Circus, Circus for 23 years, with their longevity cited, among the other achievements, on the historical marker documenting the group's induction into the Circus Ring of Fame in 2009.

Terry Cavaretta, in particular, is remembered for her execution of complex aerial maneuvers while a member of The Flying Cavarettas and its spin-off groups. She was the first woman to perform a quadruple somersault on flying trapeze, the first aerialist to perform a triple back somersault with one and a half twists, and is listed in the Guinness Book of Records for achieving the most triple somersaults. In 2014, she was individually inducted into the International Circus Hall of Fame.

== See also ==
- Circus Circus Las Vegas
- Circus Hall of Fame
- Ringling Brothers and Barnum & Bailey Circus
- Trapeze
