= Flagler Beach, Florida =

- City
- City of Flagler Beach
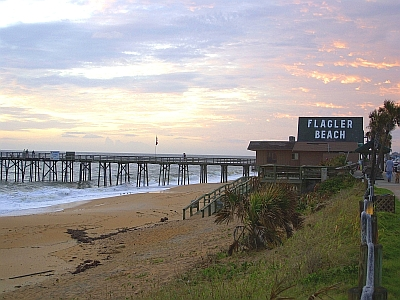
- Scenic view of Flagler Beach Pier

- Seal

- Location in Flagler County and the state of Florida
- Coordinates: 29°28′20″N 81°07′47″W
- Country: United States
- State: Florida
- County: Flagler, Volusia
- Incorporated: April 16, 1925

Government
  - Type: Commission-Manager

Area
  - Total: 4.08 sq mi (10.58 km^{2})
  - Land: 3.58 sq mi (9.28 km^{2})
  - Water: 0.50 sq mi (1.30 km^{2}) 9.8%
- Elevation: 0 ft (0 m)

Population (2020)
  - Total: 5,160
  - Density: 1,439.6/sq mi (555.83/km^{2})
- Time zone: UTC-5 (EST)
  - Summer (DST): UTC-4 (EDT)
- ZIP code: 32136
- Area code: 386
- FIPS code: 12-22550
- GNIS feature ID: 2403613
- Website: cityofflaglerbeach.com

Flagler Beach is a city in Flagler and Volusia counties, United States. Its population was 5,160 at the 2020 census. Flagler Beach is part of the Deltona–Daytona Beach–Ormond Beach, FL metropolitan statistical area. It is named for oil tycoon and Florida railroad developer Henry Flagler, who was a key figure in the development of East Florida as resort and vacation destinations.

== Geography ==
According to the United States Census Bureau, the city has a total area of 4.1 square miles (10.6 km^{2}), of which 0.39 square miles (1.0 km^{2}) (9.80%) is covered by water.

The Ocean Palm Villas South subdivision east of the Intracoastal Waterway is the only portion of Flagler Beach in Volusia County.

Florida State Road A1A travels through Flagler Beach along an approximate north–south axis. The road suffered significant damage during Hurricane Matthew, due to coastal erosion facilitated by a storm surge.

== Demographics ==
Historical population
| Census | Pop. | Note | %± |
|---|---|---|---|
| 1930 | 198 | | — |
| 1940 | 133 | | −32.8% |
| 1950 | 374 | | 181.2% |
| 1960 | 970 | | 159.4% |
| 1970 | 1,042 | | 7.4% |
| 1980 | 2,208 | | 111.9% |
| 1990 | 3,820 | | 73.0% |
| 2000 | 4,954 | | 29.7% |
| 2010 | 4,484 | | −9.5% |
| 2020 | 5,160 | | 15.1% |
U.S. Decennial Census

=== Racial and ethnic composition ===
Flagler Beach racial composition (Hispanics excluded from racial categories) (NH = Non-Hispanic)
| Race | Pop 2010 | Pop 2020 | % 2010 | % 2020 |
|---|---|---|---|---|
| White (NH) | 4,259 | 4,627 | 94.98% | 89.67% |
| Black or African American (NH) | 30 | 48 | 0.67% | 0.93% |
| Native American or Alaska Native (NH) | 11 | 19 | 0.25% | 0.37% |
| Asian (NH) | 29 | 52 | 0.65% | 1.01% |
| Pacific Islander or Native Hawaiian (NH) | 0 | 2 | 0.00% | 0.04% |
| Some other race (NH) | 1 | 18 | 0.02% | 0.35% |
| Two or more races/multiracial (NH) | 45 | 179 | 1.00% | 3.47% |
| Hispanic or Latino (any race) | 109 | 215 | 2.43% | 4.17% |
| Total | 4,484 | 5,160 | | |

=== 2020 census ===
As of the 2020 census, Flagler Beach had a population of 5,160. The median age was 61.3 years. 8.7% of residents were under the age of 18 and 40.1% were 65 years of age or older. For every 100 females, there were 91.6 males, and for every 100 females age 18 and over, there were 90.9 males age 18 and over.

97.9% of residents lived in urban areas, while 2.1% lived in rural areas.

There were 2,668 households in Flagler Beach, of which 11.8% had children under the age of 18 living in them. Of all households, 49.9% were married-couple households, 18.1% were households with a male householder and no spouse or partner present, and 26.5% were households with a female householder and no spouse or partner present. About 33.2% of all households were made up of individuals, and 19.4% had someone living alone who was 65 years of age or older.

There were 3,687 housing units, of which 27.6% were vacant. The homeowner vacancy rate was 3.8% and the rental vacancy rate was 11.9%.

=== Demographic estimates ===
The 2020 ACS 5-year estimate reported 1,490 families in the city.

=== 2010 census ===
As of the 2010 United States census, 4,484 people, 2,363 households, and 1,410 families were living in the city.

=== 2000 census ===
As of the 2000 census, 4,954 people, 2,535 households, and 1,493 families resided in the city. The population density was 519.8 people/km^{2} (1,346 people/mi^{2}). The 3,224 housing units had an average density of 338.3 units/km^{2} (876 units/mi^{2}). The racial makeup of the city was 97.86% White, 0.52% Black or African American, 0.22% Native American, 0.57% Asian, 0.02% Pacific Islander, 0.14% from other races, and 0.67% from two or more races. Hispanics or Latinos of any race were 1.84% of the population.

Of the 2,535 households, 12.9% had children under 18 living with them, 50.6% were married couples living together, 6.5% had a female householder with no husband present, and 41.1% were not families. About 33.8% of all households were made up of individuals, and 16.9% had someone living alone who was 65 or older. The average household size was 1.95 and the average family size was 2.43.

In 2000, the age distribution was 11.5% under 18, 4.4% from 18 to 24, 20.0% from 25 to 44, 32.5% from 45 to 64, and 31.5% who were 65 or older. The median age was 53 years. For every 100 females, there were 92.8 males. For every 100 females 18 and over, there were 91.2 males.

In 2000, the median income for a household in the city was $37,917, and for a family was $47,073. Males had a median income of $31,848 versus $30,132 for females. The per capita income for the city was $24,600. About 9.0% of families and 10.9% of the population were below the poverty line, including 18.4% of those under age 18 and 10.4% of those age 65 or over.

== Attractions ==
=== America's Coolest Small Town finalist ===
Flagler Beach was a finalist in the 2013 Budget Travel magazine contest for "Coolest Small Town". The magazine described it as:

Twenty miles north of Daytona Beach on A1A, Flagler Beach couldn't be more different from its party-hardy neighbor to the south. In fact, the area seems to attract more sea turtles and right whales than spring breakers. And it's not hard to see why: This thin strip of a beach town, between the Atlantic Ocean and the Intracoastal Waterway, has remained significantly less developed than its neighbors. The six miles of pristine sand—which boast an orange hue thanks to crushed coquina shells—are only interrupted by one fishing pier. In town, the vibe is laid back and retro, thanks to spots like Grampa's Uke Joint, which sells ukuleles, and High Tides at Snack Jack, a 1950s fish shack that attracts surfers with funky dishes like tuna reubens, ahi club sandwiches, and sake Bloody Marys.

=== Retirement location ===
Flagler Beach was ranked by Where to Retire magazine as one of the top retirement destinations in Florida. It was featured in the November–December 2012 issue.

=== Flagler Beach Historical Museum ===
The Flagler Beach Historical Museum's permanent collection is entirely dedicated to Florida history, featuring Flagler Beach and Flagler County. The collection ranges from prehistoric bones and other remains of the Stone Age to a "Space Age" side. The latter has an exhibit with items provided by NASA astronauts, including space food and the Flagler Beach city flag, which was sent to orbit the Earth aboard the Space Shuttle Endeavour.

Orange Period pottery pieces from indigenous peoples of the region date from 2000 BCE to 500 CE Historic Native American Indian life is represented by an exhibit of arrowheads and other artifacts, all discovered in Flagler County.

The Florida territory had changing European rulers in the war years between the 1500s and the early 1800s: Spanish, English and American. Mill and plantation artifacts make up the display about the Plantation Period. Personal-use items, such as buttons and bottles obtained from area missions, represent the history of individuals in the area. From the Mala Compra Plantation, burned down during the Second Seminole War, the museum has items from the early 19th-century home of Joseph Hernandez, who was elected as the first Hispanic congressman in the U.S.

The period of the late 1800s and early 1900s is represented by books and exhibits about the area's economy - county farming of cabbage and potatoes, timber industry, railroad artifacts, and turpentine camp items. Exhibits also include documents and memorabilia associated with the 20th-century development boom that began in the western portion of Flagler County and was continued oceanside. Displays feature four Flagler Beach "first families" who purchased land and built what was once considered a seaside resort.

Other display items from the early 1900s include memorabilia from early city government, the county's Old Brick Road, the Flagler Beach Hotel, World War II items, the A1A highway, Marineland, and early advertising brochures. Representations of local organizations from 1925 forward are represented in displays featuring the Flagler Beach Fire Department, Boy Scouts of Flagler, and Flagler Beach schools.

== Fire department ==
The Flagler Beach Fire Department was established in 1926 by the Town of Flagler Beach's Commission. Currently, Flagler Beach has a population of roughly 5,500 year-round residents, and its fire department responds to around 1,500 calls a year. The City of Flagler Beach is served by a full-time professional staff of 16 fire department employees on duty 24 hours a day to provide an immediate response 365 days a year.
