= WTIB =

Talk radio station in Williamston, North Carolina, United States

- Williamston, North Carolina; United States
- Broadcast area: Greenville; Eastern North Carolina
- Frequency: 103.7 MHz
- Branding: Talk 96.3 & 103.7

Programming
- Format: Talk radio
- Network: NCN News; Fox News Radio
- Affiliations: Premiere Networks; Westwood One

Ownership
- Owner: Inner Banks Media
- Sister stations: WNBU, WNCT-FM, WRHD, WRHT

History
- First air date: August 1, 1962; 63 years ago
- Former call signs: WIAM-FM (1962–1975); WSEC (1975–1987); WKKE (1987–1988); WHTE (1988–1994); WCBZ (1994–2004); WRHD (2004–2010)

Technical information
- Licensing authority: FCC
- Facility ID: 9643
- Class: C1
- ERP: 100,000 watts
- HAAT: 299 meters (981 ft)
- Transmitter coordinates: 35°53′54.6″N 76°59′8.8″W

Links
- Public license information: Public file; LMS
- Webcast: Listen live
- Website: www.wtibfm.com

WTIB (103.7 FM) is a commercial radio station broadcasting a talk radio format. It is licensed to Williamston, North Carolina, and it serves the Greenville area of Eastern North Carolina. It is owned by Inner Banks Media, with studios and offices on West Arlington Boulevard in Greenville. Most WTIB programming is simulcast with sister station WRHT (96.3 FM) in Morehead City.

WTIB has an effective radiated power (ERP) of 100,000 watts, the maximum for most FM stations in the U.S. The transmitter is on Davenport Road in Williamston.

== Programming ==
Weekday mornings on WTIB and WRHT begin with a local wake-up show, Talk of the Town with Henry Hinton and Patrick Johnson. (Hinton owns the stations.) In afternoon drive time, a local hour of talk airs at 5 p.m. with Tom & Bernie. The rest of the weekday schedule is nationally syndicated talk shows, including The Glenn Beck Radio Program, The Clay Travis and Buck Sexton Show, The Sean Hannity Show, The Mark Levin Show, The Dana Loesch Show and Coast to Coast AM with George Noory.

Weekends feature programs on health, money, guns, farming and religion. Weekend syndicated shows include The Chris Plante Show, The Weekend with Michael Brown, The Ben Ferguson Show and Gun Talk with Tom Gresham as well as repeats of weekday shows. Most hours begin with an update from NCN News, with reports from CBS News Radio.

== History ==
=== WIAM-FM, WSEC, WKKE ===
The station signed on the air on August 1, 1962. The original call sign was WIAM-FM. At first, it was powered at 3,000 watts, a fraction of its current output. It was the sister station of WIAM (900 AM). They were owned by the East Carolina Broadcasting Company and during WIAM-FM's early years, the two stations simulcast.

By the early 1970s, WIAM-FM began running its own automated Top 40 format. The call letters switched to WSEC in 1975. It later became WKKE "Key 103.7", owned by Mega Media.

=== Top 40 and country ===
Seacomm bought the station and changed it to WHTE "Hot 104", moving the station's studios to Greenville. Gray Communications bought WHTE and changed it to contemporary Christian using the CBN Network format. In July 1991, WHTE began simulcasting with 95.9 WRHT, returning to Top 40 (CHR) as "The Hot FM". The stations separated in 1993 with WHTE playing hip hop music, until 1994 when it switched again to "Z 103.7" FM.

On April 24, 1995, 96.3 and 103.7 returned to a simulcast operation. Together they were once again playing Top 40 music. On April 25, 2007, the stations switched to country music as "Thunder Country".

=== Talk radio ===
On March 15, 2010, 103.7 FM became the new home of WTIB. It began simulcasting a talk radio format with 94.3 WRHD. WRHD later switched to sports talk.

In 2018, WTIB rejoined its simulcast with 96.3 WRHT, airing a talk radio format. The stations carried The Rush Limbaugh Show for several years, up to his death in 2021. Limbaugh's show was replaced by The Clay Travis and Buck Sexton Show, which WTIB and WRHT continue to air. The two stations mostly carry the Premiere Networks line up of conservative talk hosts.
