= WLNR =

- Kinston, North Carolina; United States
- Frequency: 1230 kHz

Programming
- Format: Talk radio

Ownership
- Owner: Estuardo Valdemar Rodriguez

History
- First air date: 1953
- Former call signs: WISP (1953–1991); WQDW (1991–1995)

Technical information
- Licensing authority: FCC
- Facility ID: 57609
- Class: C
- Power: 1,000 watts
- Transmitter coordinates: 35°15′31.6″N 77°36′31.9″W
- Translator: 106.9 W295CS (Kinston)

Links
- Public license information: Public file; LMS

WLNR (1230 AM) is a radio station broadcasting a talk radio format in Kinston, North Carolina, U.S. The station is owned by Estuardo Valdemar Rodriguez.

== History ==
WISP was playing popular music as far back as the 1950s. Later formats included sports radio and gospel music.
