= WRTH-LP =

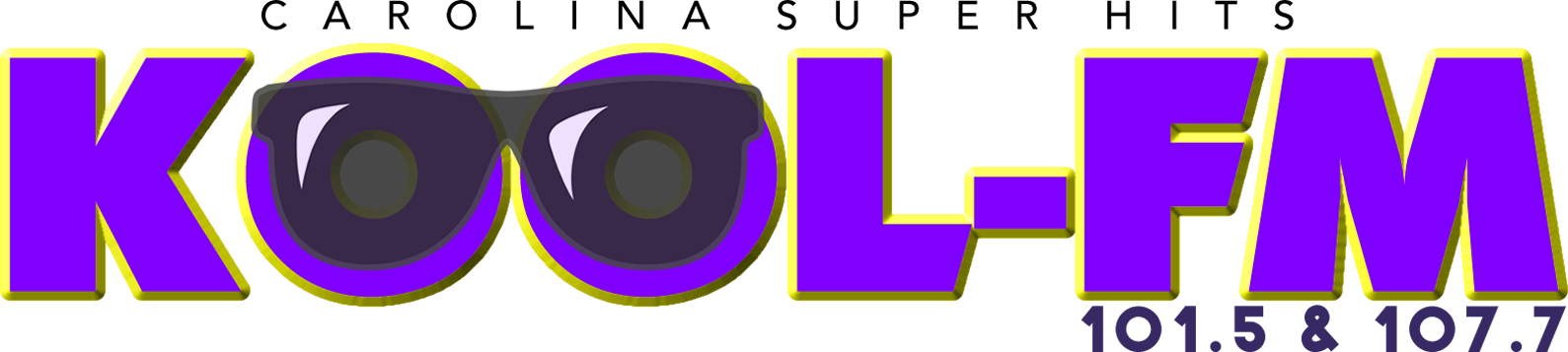
- Greenville, South Carolina; United States
- Broadcast area: Upstate South Carolina; Greenville County, South Carolina
- Frequency: 101.5 MHz
- Branding: Oldies Radio Kool-FM

Programming
- Format: Oldies; beach music; classic hits

Ownership
- Owner: Quality Radio Partners, Inc; (Quality Radio Partners)

History
- First air date: July 2, 2014
- Former call signs: WEZG-LP (2014–2016); WBWT-LP (2016–2018); WZWK-LP (2018–2023)
- Call sign meaning: "Earth" (derived from previous WRTH)

Technical information
- Licensing authority: FCC
- Facility ID: 192101
- Class: LP100
- ERP: 25 watts
- HAAT: 50 meters (160 ft)
- Transmitter coordinates: 34°50′19.4″N 82°21′45.6″W
- Translator: 107.7 W299BO (Berea)

Links
- Public license information: LMS
- Webcast: Listen live
- Website: koolfm.net

WRTH-LP is an oldies/beach music radio station licensed to Greenville, South Carolina, and serving the entire Greenville County region. It is licensed by the Federal Communications Commission (FCC) to broadcast on 101.5 MHz with an FCC authorized ERP (effective radiated power) of 100 watts. The station goes by the name "Oldies Radio Kool-FM"

WRTH-LP started broadcast as a Gold Based adult contemporary station on July 2, 2014, and still provides a locally owned-and-operated full-service music-based station. WRTH-LP is locally owned and operated by Greenville-based Quality Radio Partners. The transmitter is tower located near the geographic center of the local Greenville population.

WRTH-LP switched to its current oldies format on November 19, 2018, and, after adding the 107.7 frequency, changed its branding to Oldies Radio Kool-FM on October 7, 2019, playing a Carolina-based blend of oldies and classic hits from the 1960s, 1970s, 1980s and 1990s.

== History ==
WRTH-LP first went on the air as WEZG-LP on July 2, 2014, with a 24-hour mix of songs with "Abigail" as the subject matter. The station frequency, studios and operation were developed by Dave Solomon, a veteran of the radio business since 1979; having owned other radio stations and achieved ratings success as a program director & operations manager throughout the Carolinas (Greensboro, Raleigh, Myrtle Beach & others) for large radio groups like Clear Channel, Entercom, Cumulus and more. Solomon also was one of the creators and sole voice over talent for the SaveNetRadio Music Licensing Campaign, regarding licensing fees paid to SoundExchange, a performance rights organization. His political ads were broadcast on thousands of radio stations coast to coast and quoted in numerous national media. The Copyright Review Board proposed a huge rate increase, SaveNetRadio was victorious via Congress, in the passage of the Internet Radio Equality Act in July 2007. He also serves as the executive director for the Washington, DC advocacy group Low Power FM Advocacy Group (LPFM-FM), who files to protect the licensees of LPFM stations through multiple protective filing at the FCC.

On January 8, 2016, WEZG-LP changed its call sign to WBWT-LP and adopted the moniker "101-5 The Beat".

On November 19, 2018, the station changed its call sign to WZWK-LP.

On November 22, 2023, the station filed to adopt the call sign WRTH-LP. The change took place on November 28.
