= WNCT (AM) =

- Greenville, North Carolina; United States
- Broadcast area: Greenville-New Bern
- Frequency: 1070 kHz
- Branding: Beach, Boogie, & Blues Radio

Programming
- Format: Beach music

Ownership
- Owner: Curtis Media Group; (CMG Coastal Carolina, LLC)
- Sister stations: WIKS, WSFL-FM, WMGV, WMJV

History
- First air date: 1940
- Former call signs: WGTC (1940–1965)
- Former frequencies: 1500 kHz (1940–1941); 1490 kHz (1941–1950); 1590 kHz (1950–1972)
- Call sign meaning: North Carolina Television (from former sister station WNCT-TV)

Technical information
- Licensing authority: FCC
- Facility ID: 57841
- Class: D
- Power: 5,000 watts day; 13 watts night
- Transmitter coordinates: 35°36′11.58″N 77°25′33.88″W
- Translator: See § Translators
- Repeaters: 101.9 WIKS-HD2 (New Bern); 106.5 WSFL-FM HD2 (New Bern); 102.9 WELS-FM (Kinston)

Links
- Public license information: Public file; LMS
- Webcast: Listen live
- Website: www.beachboogieandblues.com

WNCT (1070 kHz) is an AM radio station broadcasting a beach music format, as "Beach, Boogie and Blues". Licensed to Greenville, North Carolina, United States, the station serves the Greenville-New Bern area. The station is currently owned by Curtis Media Group Inc.

== History ==
In 1963, Roy H. Park, owner of WNCT-TV, bought WGTC, Greenville's oldest radio station. At the time, the station broadcast at 5,000 watts at 1590 AM. WGTC changed its call letters to the current WNCT two years later. In 1969, WNCT moved to 1070 AM and increased its power to 10,000 watts.

Hinton Media Group programmed WNCT when it was "Talk 1070" and aired its programming on local Cable Channel 7. In 2006, WNCT increased its daytime power to 50,000 watts. The station also became the first AM station in North Carolina to utilize HD radio technology.

By 2008, WNCT aired a contemporary Christian music format. As of January 5, 2009, the station currently brands itself as "Beach, Boogie and Blues" and plays Carolina Beach Music.

On February 2, 2017, Beasley Media Group announced that it would sell its six stations and four translators in the Greenville-New Bern-Jacksonville, North Carolina market, including WNCT, to Curtis Media Group for $11 million to reduce the company's debt; the deal separated the station from WNCT-FM, which was concurrently divested to Inner Banks Media to comply with FCC ownership limits. The sale was completed on May 1, 2017.

The beach music format began a simulcast on WELS-FM in Kinston on July 1, 2017.

== Translators ==
In addition to the two main stations, WNCT is relayed by an additional three translators to widen its broadcast area. The translators are fed by WIKS-HD2.

Broadcast translators for WIKS-HD2
Call sign	Frequency	City of license	FID	ERP (W)	HAAT	Class	Transmitter coordinates	FCC info
W239BC	95.7 FM	New Bern, North Carolina	157318	250	0 m (0 ft)	D	35°8′21.6″N 77°4′40.8″W	LMS
W266AV	101.1 FM	Jacksonville, North Carolina	157270	250	72.6 m (238 ft)	D	34°44′56.6″N 77°24′49.9″W	LMS
W290CB	105.9 FM	Winterville, North Carolina	157773	250	150.2 m (493 ft)	D	35°32′39.6″N 77°21′24.3″W	LMS
