= National Register of Historic Places listings in Avery County, North Carolina =

This list includes properties and districts listed on the National Register of Historic Places in Avery County, North Carolina. Click the "Map of all coordinates" link to the right to view an online map of all properties and districts with latitude and longitude coordinates in the table below.

This National Park Service list is complete through NPS recent listings posted March 14, 2025.

== Current listings ==
	Name on the Register	Image	Date listed	Location	City or town	Description
1	Avery County Courthouse	Avery County Courthouse	May 10, 1979 (#79001660)	Montezuma St., Courthouse Dr. and Glenn Hicks Lane; 36°05′12″N 81°55′37″W	Newland	
2	Avery County Jail	Avery County Jail	December 9, 1999 (#99001494)	1829 Schultz Cir. and Glenn Hicks Lane; 36°05′12″N 81°55′34″W	Newland	former jail that now houses the Avery Historical Museum
3	Banner Elk Hotel	Banner Elk Hotel	October 6, 2000 (#00001182)	309 Banner St. 36°09′38″N 81°52′19″W	Banner Elk	
4	Banner Elk School	Banner Elk School	September 18, 2017 (#100001628)	185 Azalea Cir. 36°09′46″N 81°52′12″W	Banner Elk	
5	Blue Ridge Parkway	Blue Ridge Parkway	December 13, 2024 (#100011353)	Blue Ridge Parkway through Virginia and North Carolina; 36°04′06″N 81°50′32″W	Linville vicinity	
6	Crossnore Presbyterian Church		March 1, 1996 (#96000206)	US 221/NC 194 E side, opposite jct. with Dellinger Rd. 36°01′06″N 81°55′47″W	Crossnore	
7	Crossnore School Historic District		February 18, 2009 (#09000059)	Within the campus of Crossnore School, N. side of NC 1143, opposite junction with NC 1148; 36°01′25″N 81°55′47″W	Crossnore	
8	Elk Park School	Elk Park School	December 16, 2005 (#05001410)	253 Elk Park School Rd. 36°09′41″N 81°58′49″W	Elk Park	former school built by the Works Progress Administration; now a senior citizen living center
9	Edwin Cochran Guy House		December 10, 2021 (#100007245)	320 Wanteska St. 36°05′13″N 81°55′47″W	Newland	
10	Linville Falls Tavern (former)	Linville Falls Tavern (former)	December 28, 2000 (#00001554)	25 Rock House Ln. 35°57′32″N 81°56′34″W	Linville Falls	Now Famous Louise's Rock House Restaurant. Extends into Burke County as well as McDowell County.
11	Linville Historic District	Linville Historic District	March 7, 1979 (#79001659)	U.S. 221; 36°03′58″N 81°52′10″W	Linville	
12	Robert Chester and Elsie H. Lowe House		May 1, 2013 (#13000226)	1010 Shawneehaw Ave. 36°09′11″N 81°52′01″W	Banner Elk	
13	Weaving Room of Crossnore School		April 25, 2001 (#01000417)	205 Johnson Ln. 36°01′25″N 81°55′50″W	Crossnore	
14	Milligan Shuford Wise and Theron Colbert Dellinger Houses	Milligan Shuford Wise and Theron Colbert Dellinger Houses	August 27, 2008 (#08000811)	152 and 158 Hemlock Ln., 142 Dellinger Rd., 110 Pine St. 36°01′13″N 81°55′48″W	Crossnore	
15	Ray Wiseman House	Ray Wiseman House	November 29, 1996 (#96001397)	7540 Linville Falls Hwy. 35°59′34″N 81°56′34″W	Altamont	

== See also ==
Map of National Register of Historic Places listings in Avery County
- National Register of Historic Places listings in North Carolina
- List of National Historic Landmarks in North Carolina
