= Wind power in Tennessee =

Electricity from wind in one U.S. state

Wind power in Tennessee has most potential in East Tennessee along the North Carolina border. The state has not passed renewable portfolio standard legislation and there is just one utility-scale wind farm with 15 operating turbines and previously 3 test turbines. The Tennessee Valley Authority (TVA), based in Knoxville, imports wind-generated electricity into its service area which includes Tennessee. Former US Senator Lamar Alexander from Tennessee is an outspoken critic of wind power.

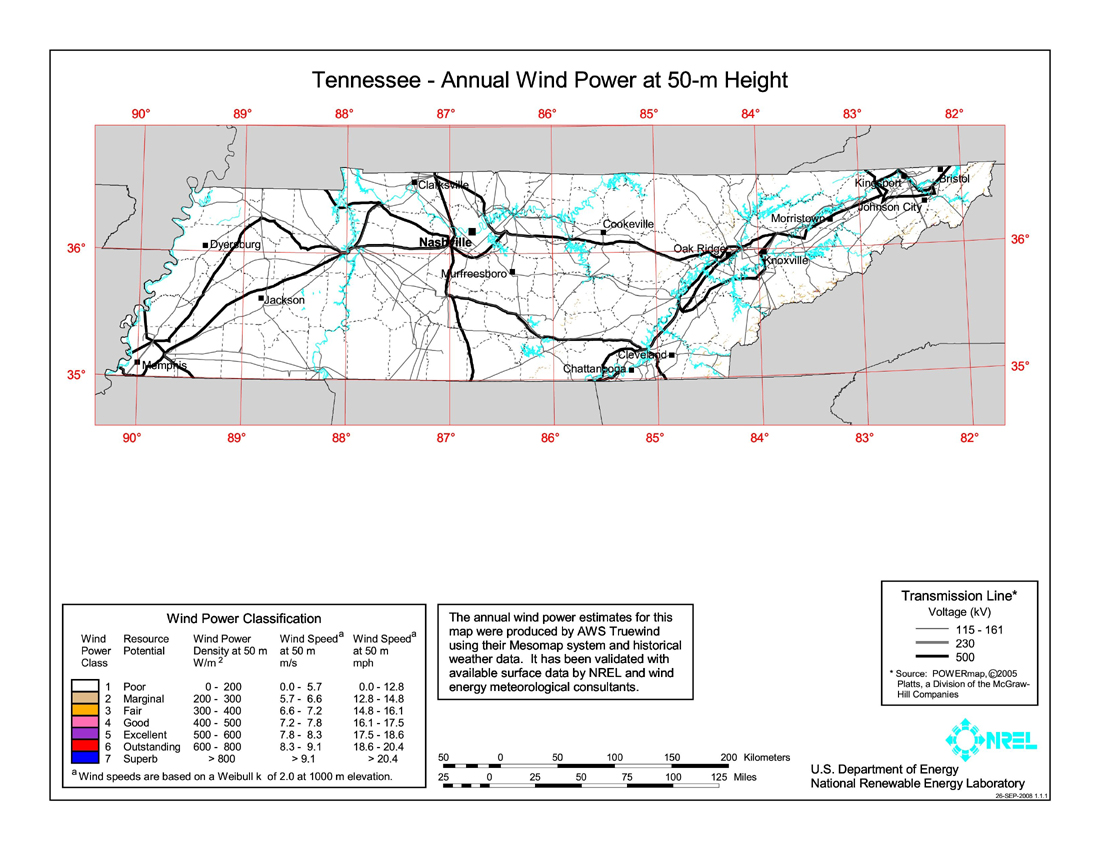
2008 US Department of Energy wind power potential map of Tennessee

According to engineers at TVA none of the windmills is now generating power because of maintenance and mechanical issues.

== Buffalo Mountain ==
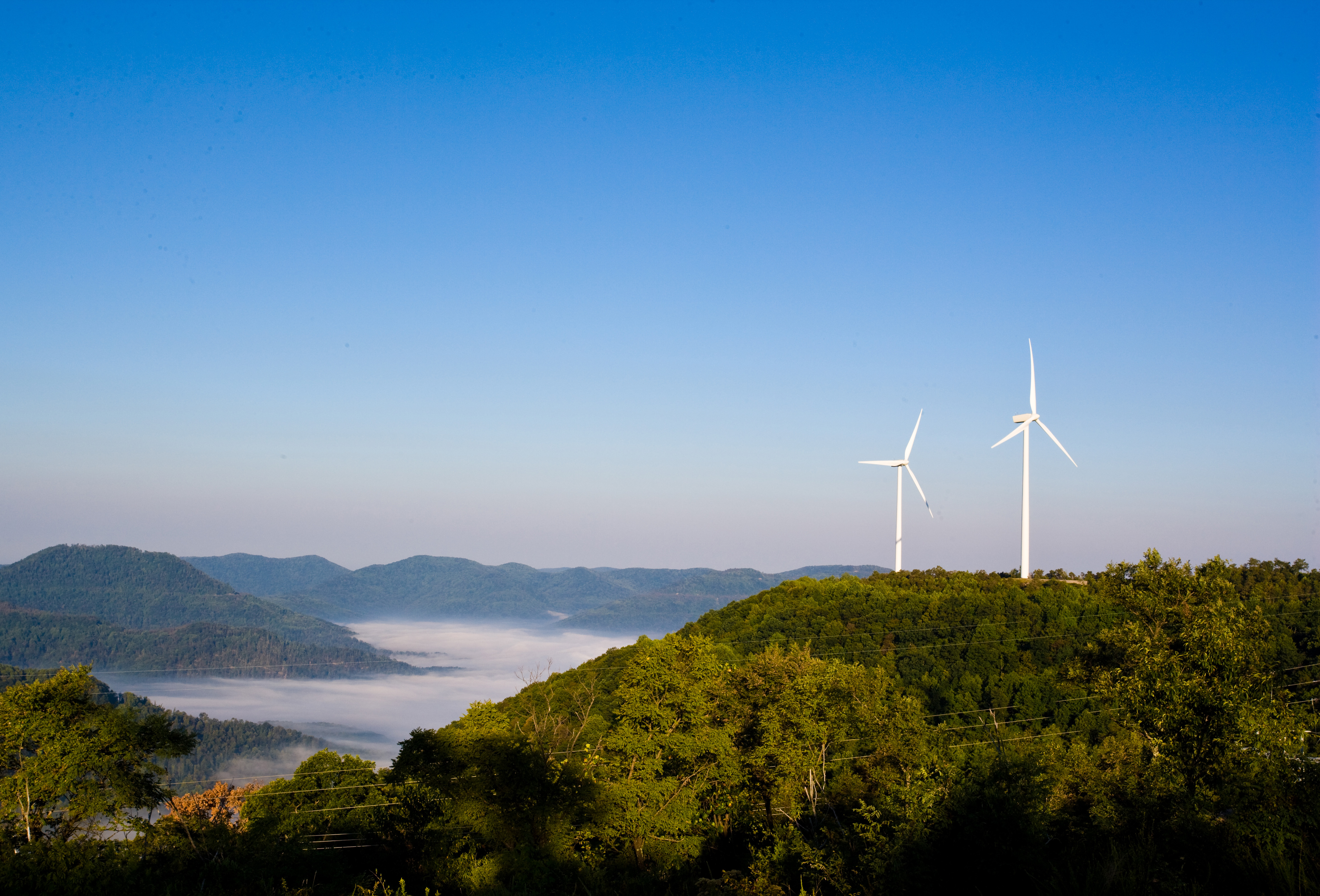
TVA wind turbines on Buffalo Mountain

Located north of Oak Ridge and Oliver Springs, and east of Frozen Head State Park about thirty miles northwest of Knoxville, Buffalo Mountain Wind Farm was built in 2000 by the Tennessee Valley Authority (TVA).

Before expanding the wind plant at Buffalo Mountain, TVA proposed fourteen wind turbines on a ridge north of Beech Mountain, within 11 miles of the Appalachian Trail.

Until 2009 the TVA operated three wind turbines with a combined generation capacity of 2 MW "as a test bed". TVA stopped operating the three turbines in 2009 due to maintenance issues. In 2021 TVA announced no access would be allowed in the area while it is removing the three original test wind turbines that "reached their end of life." It purchases the output of 15 wind turbines built in 2004 and owned by Invenergy that have a combined capacity of 27 MW.

As of May 29, 2026, the wind turbines are no longer visible from Highway 116, the closest vantage point to view them outside Windrock Park. Up until sometime in 2025, they were visible from various points around Oak Ridge, but it appears they have been removed.

== TVA import ==
The Tennessee Valley Authority service area covers most of Tennessee, portions of Alabama, Mississippi, and Kentucky, and small sections of Georgia, North Carolina, and Virginia. As of 2013, the agency had power purchased agreements with wind farms outside its service area:

- 2012 - Enel Green Power, LLC - 201MW - Caney River Wind Farm, Elk County, Kansas.
- 2012- Invenergy - 400MW - Bishop Hill Wind Energy Center, Henry County, Illinois 200 megawatts generated by General Electric 1.5-megawatt SLE turbines. This facility began delivery in July 2012.
- 2012- Invenergy - 200MW - California Ridge Wind Energy Center in Champaign County, Illinois
- 2012- NextEra Energy Resources - 150MW - White Oak Energy Center, McLean County, Illinois
- 2012- NextEra Energy Resources- 165MW - Cimarron Wind farm, Gray County, Kansas

A 2010 agreement with Iberdrola Renewables provides a potential 300MW future supply from Streator-Cayuga Ridge Wind Farm, Livingston County, Illinois

== Clean Line Energy transmission ==
Clean Line Energy LLC is proposing 700-mile power transmission line to bring wind energy from Oklahoma and to the Tennessee Valley. The TVA would import 1,750 megawatts, about half of the power that could be transmitted. Developers began in 2007 to seek regulatory approval for the $2 billion project, but the approvals needed to start construction aren't expected to be in place until at least 2020. The project faces opposition, particularly in Arkansas.

== Statistics ==
Tennessee Wind Generation Capacity by Year
Megawatts of Wind Capacity

== See also ==
- Solar power in Tennessee
- Wind power in the United States
- Renewable energy in the United States
