= Shawneehaw Creek =

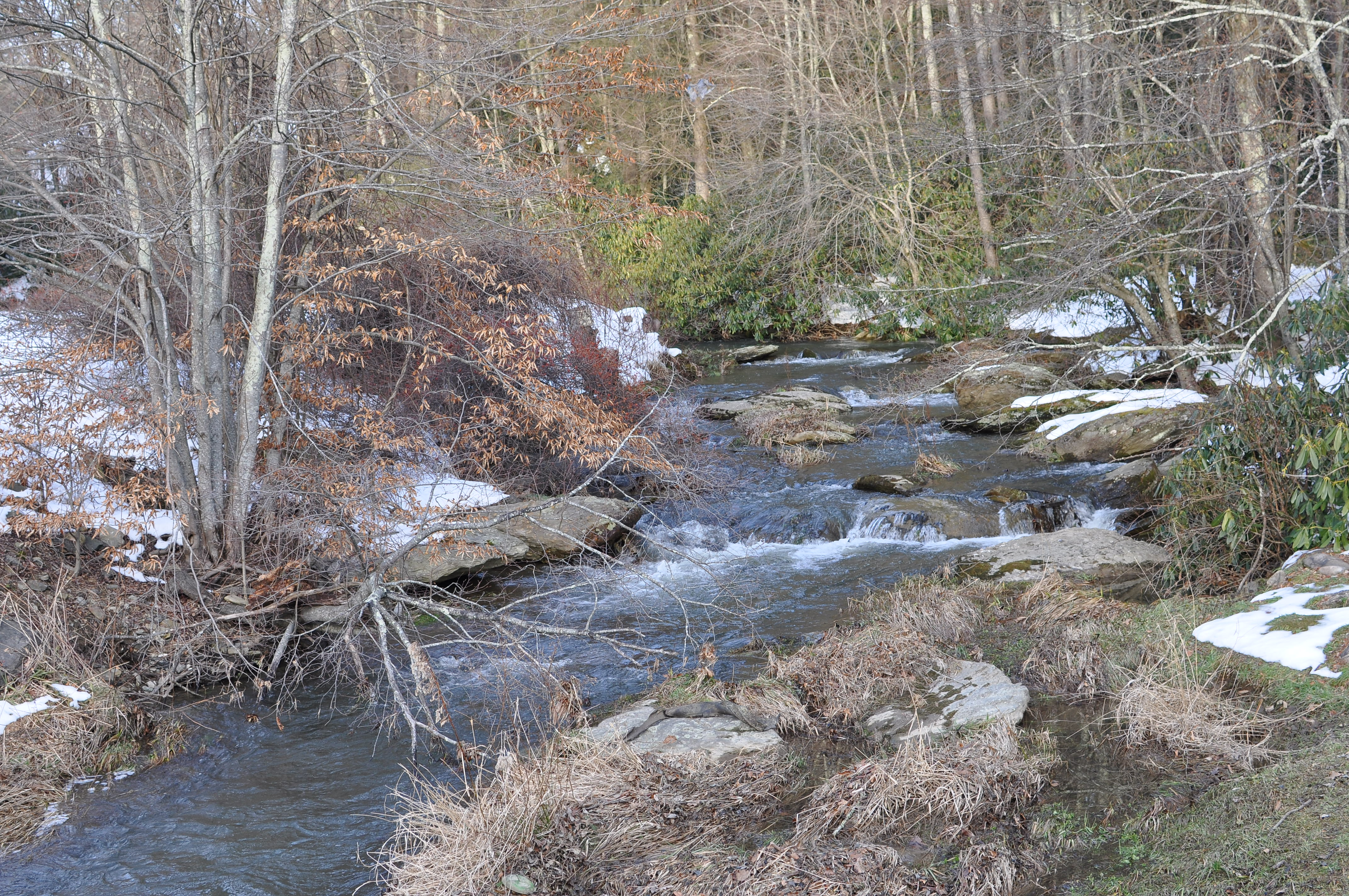
- Shawneehaw Creek from Shawneehaw Ave. in Banner Elk

Location
- Country: United States
- State: North Carolina
- Counties: Watauga, Avery

Physical characteristics
- Source
  - location: Watauga County, NC
  - coordinates: 36°11′11″N 81°50′43″W
- Mouth: Elk River
  - location: Avery County, NC
  - coordinates: 36°09′28″N 81°52′15″W
  - elevation: 3,638 ft (1,109 m)
- Length: 2.99 mi (4.81 km)

Basin features
- River system: Watauga River
- Tributaries
  - right: Shoemaker Creek

The Shawneehaw Creek is a stream in the North Carolina High Country and is named after a Cherokee word for a tree that blooms early in the Spring, the current name for the tree is Serviceberry, or sarvisberry, and is located in the town of Banner Elk. The headwaters begin from the Southeastern slopes of Beech Mountain in Watauga County, North Carolina and end at the Elk River in Avery County, North Carolina.The tree extend from North Carolina to Louisiana and Florida, and to 6000 feet.

== Hydrography ==
With the headwaters beginning from the Southeastern slopes of Beech Mountain (nearby Shawnee Road/SR 1127). It flows to NC 194 (Balm Highway/Main Street), then changes direction to Southwest and connects with Shoemaker Creek as it enters the town limits of Banner Elk. It goes parallel with NC 194 before it bends left and cuts through the Banner Elk park area, eventually reaching NC 184 (Tynecastle Highway/Shawneehaw Avenue). The creek ends as it flows into the Mill Pond and joins the Elk River.

The water eventually flows through the Elk River, the Watauga River, the Holston River, the Tennessee River, the Ohio River, and the Mississippi River to the Gulf of Mexico.

== Stream Restoration ==
Since 2000, the Shawneehaw Creek has been undergoing stream restoration, enhancement and stabilization. With grant money from the Clear Water Management Trust Fund, the project is going to provide vegetated riparian buffer that are going to improve the water quality and return the creek to a more natural state. The North Carolina State University extension office, the town of Banner Elk, and the local property owners are the main players of the project.

== Photo gallery ==
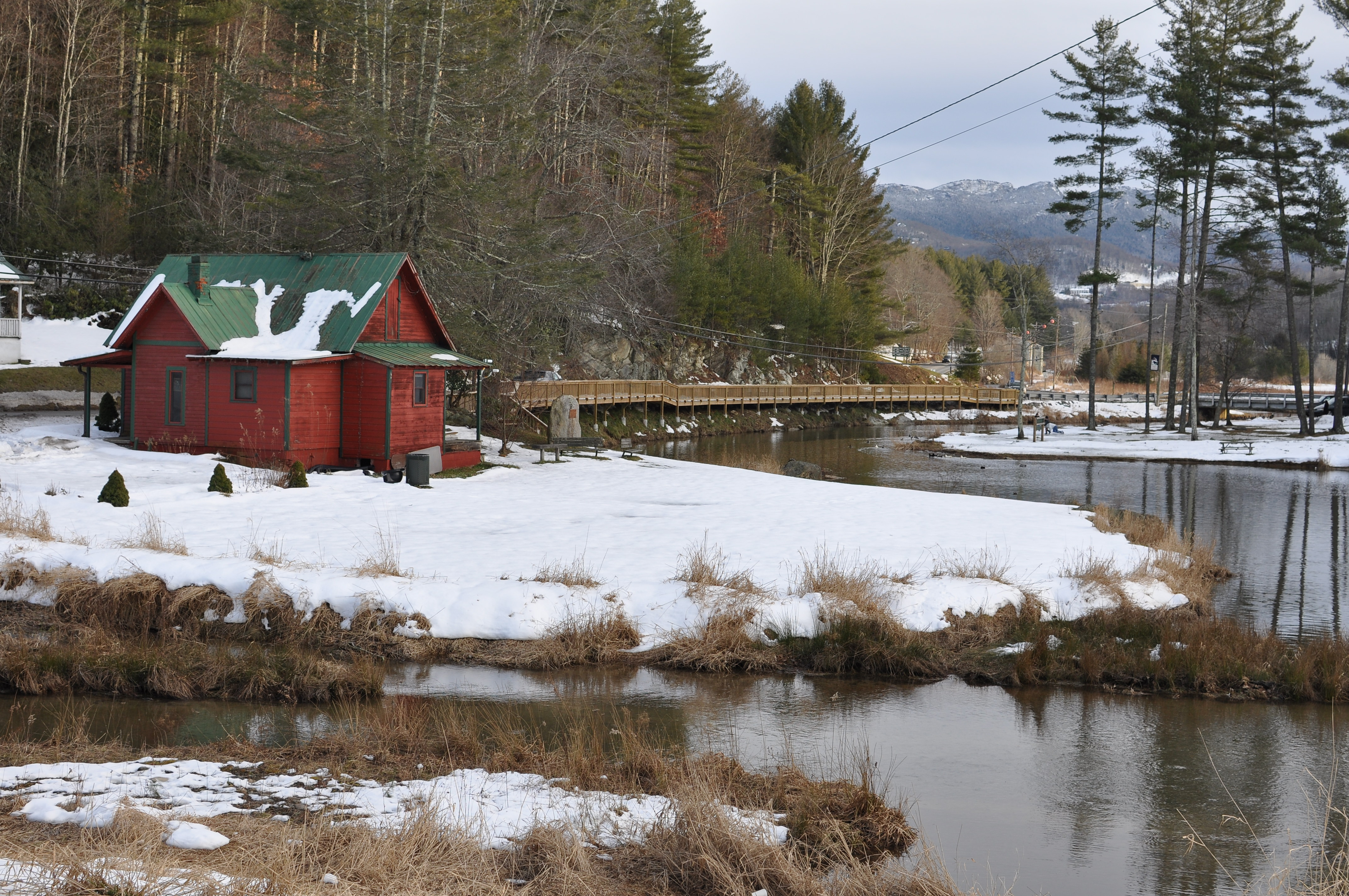
Mill Pond, where the Shawneehaw Creek and Elk River merge.

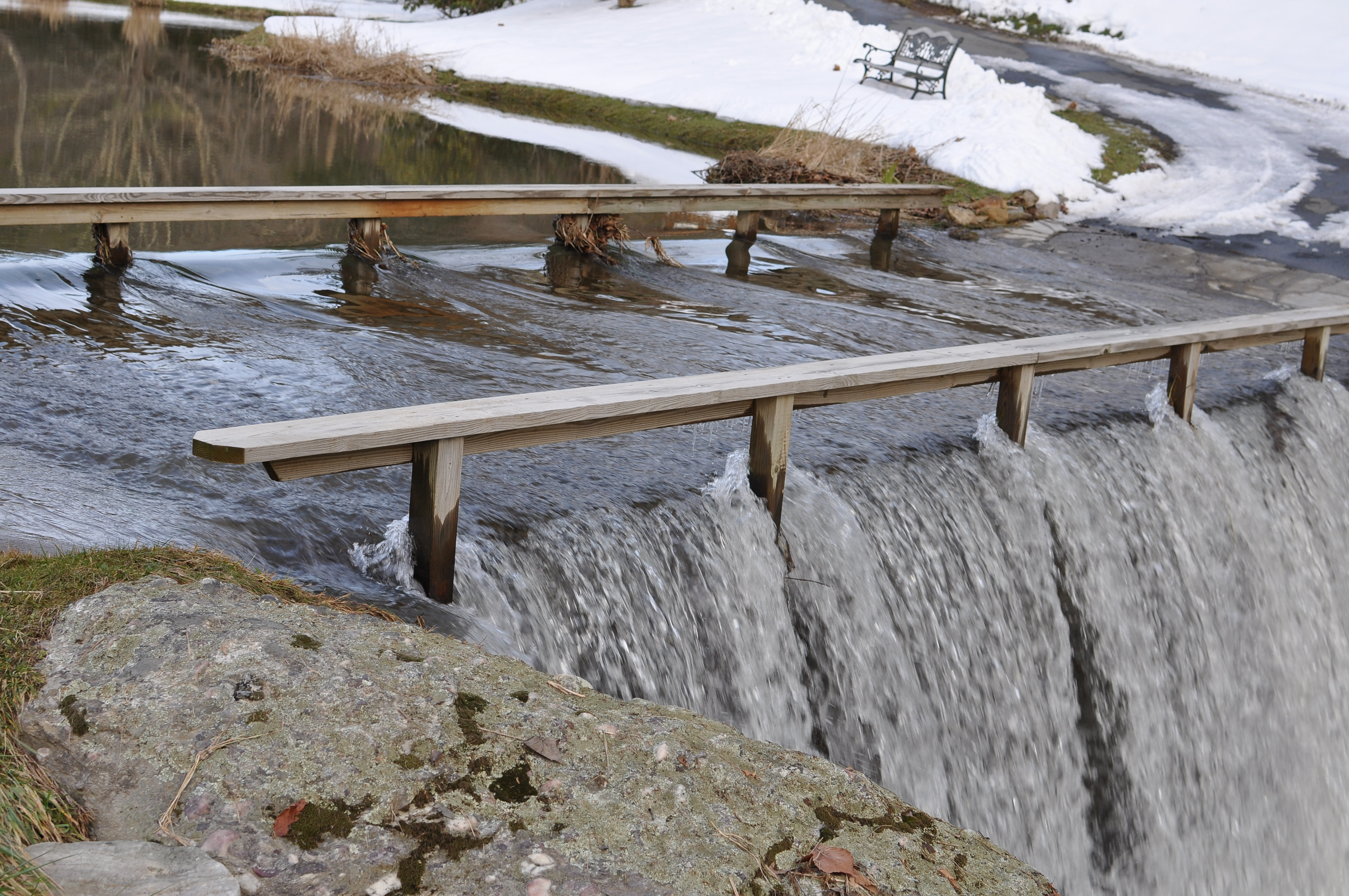
Bridge built as a ford of Shawneehaw Creek at Banner Elk
