= Banner Elk, North Carolina =

- Town
- Seal

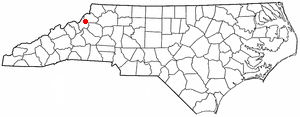
- Location of Banner Elk, North Carolina
- Coordinates: 36°09′31″N 81°52′03″W
- Country: United States
- State: North Carolina
- County: Avery
- Founded: 1848
- Incorporated: 1911

Government
  - Type: Mayor-council

Area
  - Total: 1.92 sq mi (4.97 km^{2})
  - Land: 1.92 sq mi (4.97 km^{2})
  - Water: 0 sq mi (0.00 km^{2})
- Elevation: 3,895 ft (1,187 m)

Population (2020)
  - Total: 1,049
  - Density: 546.4/sq mi (210.95/km^{2})
- Time zone: UTC−5 (Eastern (EST))
  - Summer (DST): UTC−4 (EDT)
- ZIP Code: 28604
- Area code: 828
- FIPS code: 37-03500
- GNIS feature ID: 2405208
- Website: www.townofbannerelk.org

Banner Elk is a town in Avery County, North Carolina, United States. As of the 2020 census, Banner Elk had a population of 1,049. Banner Elk is home to Lees–McRae College.

== History ==
The area surrounding the Elk River was inhabited by the Cherokee before western settlement, although no evidence of a permanent Cherokee settlement has ever been found. It is likely the area was used for hunting and fishing. The first permanent settlement was established by Martin L. Banner in 1848. Although the Banner family originally came from Wales, Martin Banner moved from Forsyth County in the Piedmont region of North Carolina. Eventually, the Banner family grew to 55 members, and the area where they lived became known as Banner's Elk. This name was later shortened to Banner Elk when the town was incorporated in 1911.

The Banner Elk Hotel and Robert Chester and Elsie H. Lowe House are listed on the National Register of Historic Places.

== Demographics ==
Historical population
Census	Pop.	Note	%±
1920	264		—
1930	340		28.8%
1970	754		—
1980	1,087		44.2%
1990	933		−14.2%
2000	811		−13.1%
2010	1,028		26.8%
2020	1,049		2.0%
U.S. Decennial Census

=== 2020 census ===
Banner Elk racial composition
Race	Number	Percentage
White (non-Hispanic)	883	84.18%
Black or African American (non-Hispanic)	47	4.48%
Native American	7	0.67%
Asian	6	0.57%
Other/Mixed	32	3.05%
Hispanic or Latino	74	7.05%

As of the 2020 United States census, there were 1,049 people, 277 households, and 147 families residing in the town.

=== 2000 census ===
As of the census of 2000, there were 811 people, 215 households, and 124 families residing in the town. The population density was 679.8 inhabitants per square mile (262.5/km^{2}). There were 290 housing units at an average density of 243.1 units per square mile (93.9 units/km^{2}). The racial makeup of the town was 90.26% White, 3.95% African American, 0.62% Native American, 1.23% Asian, 0.25% Pacific Islander, 1.23% from other races, and 2.47% from two or more races. Hispanic or Latino of any race were 1.85% of the population.

Of the 215 households, 23.3% had children under the age of 18 living with them, 46.5% were married couples living together, 8.4% had a female householder with no husband present, and 42.3% were non-families. 30.2% of all households were made up of individuals, and 8.8% had someone living alone who was 65 years of age or older. The average household size was 2.13 and the average family size was 2.65.

In the town, the population was spread out, with 10.7% under the age of 18, 47.8% from 18 to 24, 16.8% from 25 to 44, 14.9% from 45 to 64, and 9.7% who were 65 years of age or older. The median age was 22 years. For every 100 females, there were 93.1 males

== Geography ==
According to the United States Census Bureau, the town has a total area of 1.9 square miles (4.9 km^{2}), all land.

=== Climate ===
Banner Elk is located in North America's humid continental climate zone due to its elevation, which gives it a climate more like that of Altoona, Pennsylvania, than Asheville, North Carolina, during the winter. During the summer the temperatures are much like a mountain lake town in New Hampshire. The town typically has cold, snowy winters and mild summers.

Climate data for Banner Elk, North Carolina (1991–2020 normals, extremes 1907–present)
Month	Jan	Feb	Mar	Apr	May	Jun	Jul	Aug	Sep	Oct	Nov	Dec	Year
Record high °F (°C)	74 (23)	75 (24)	82 (28)	86 (30)	89 (32)	98 (37)	95 (35)	97 (36)	93 (34)	86 (30)	76 (24)	75 (24)	98 (37)
Mean maximum °F (°C)	59.3 (15.2)	62.5 (16.9)	69.3 (20.7)	76.0 (24.4)	79.4 (26.3)	82.2 (27.9)	83.9 (28.8)	82.6 (28.1)	80.9 (27.2)	75.6 (24.2)	66.4 (19.1)	61.5 (16.4)	85.0 (29.4)
Mean daily maximum °F (°C)	40.3 (4.6)	43.5 (6.4)	50.4 (10.2)	60.4 (15.8)	67.9 (19.9)	74.0 (23.3)	76.9 (24.9)	76.3 (24.6)	71.3 (21.8)	62.0 (16.7)	52.3 (11.3)	43.9 (6.6)	59.9 (15.5)
Daily mean °F (°C)	31.2 (−0.4)	33.9 (1.1)	40.4 (4.7)	49.5 (9.7)	57.7 (14.3)	64.8 (18.2)	67.8 (19.9)	66.8 (19.3)	61.4 (16.3)	51.1 (10.6)	41.5 (5.3)	34.7 (1.5)	50.1 (10.1)
Mean daily minimum °F (°C)	22.1 (−5.5)	24.3 (−4.3)	30.4 (−0.9)	38.6 (3.7)	47.4 (8.6)	55.5 (13.1)	58.7 (14.8)	57.3 (14.1)	51.5 (10.8)	40.1 (4.5)	30.8 (−0.7)	25.5 (−3.6)	40.2 (4.6)
Mean minimum °F (°C)	1.2 (−17.1)	6.3 (−14.3)	11.7 (−11.3)	22.3 (−5.4)	31.8 (−0.1)	43.2 (6.2)	48.9 (9.4)	47.8 (8.8)	37.4 (3.0)	25.0 (−3.9)	16.1 (−8.8)	8.5 (−13.1)	−1.7 (−18.7)
Record low °F (°C)	−31 (−35)	−13 (−25)	−9 (−23)	7 (−14)	19 (−7)	27 (−3)	35 (2)	31 (−1)	24 (−4)	8 (−13)	−7 (−22)	−21 (−29)	−31 (−35)
Average precipitation inches (mm)	4.62 (117)	3.70 (94)	4.87 (124)	4.83 (123)	5.13 (130)	5.12 (130)	5.68 (144)	4.31 (109)	4.55 (116)	3.41 (87)	3.30 (84)	4.25 (108)	53.77 (1,366)
Average snowfall inches (cm)	6.9 (18)	11.4 (29)	4.8 (12)	0.8 (2.0)	0.0 (0.0)	0.0 (0.0)	0.0 (0.0)	0.0 (0.0)	0.0 (0.0)	0.1 (0.25)	1.6 (4.1)	5.8 (15)	31.4 (80)
Average precipitation days (≥ 0.01 in)	13.9	11.3	13.1	12.3	13.8	14.3	15.3	14.1	11.5	9.3	9.8	13.2	151.9
Average snowy days (≥ 0.1 in)	5.7	4.2	2.9	0.9	0.1	0.0	0.0	0.0	0.0	0.2	1.0	4.4	19.3
Source: NOAA

== Attractions ==
During summertime there is hiking, whitewater rafting, fishing, and other activities. The largest lake in the area, Watauga Lake, is a favorite spot just 30 minutes away for boating, fishing and wake boarding. In the winter the main activities are skiing and snowboarding. There are two slopes in the area: Beech Mountain and Sugar Mountain. There was formerly a third, but in the winter of 2008–2009, Hawks' Nest became an all-tubing park, the largest in the Eastern United States.

There are several restaurants in Banner Elk in addition to a post office, bank, and many lodging choices. The town has hosted the Woolly Worm festival over the third weekend of October since 1978.

In the 1970s, Beech Mountain was home to a theme park based on The Wizard of Oz, called The Land of Oz, but it closed after 10 years. The attraction was never fully removed, and there have been various attempts to revive it.

== Education ==
Lees–McRae College is a private four-year college in Banner Elk. Banner Elk has a K-5th school, run by Avery County Schools.

== Photo gallery ==
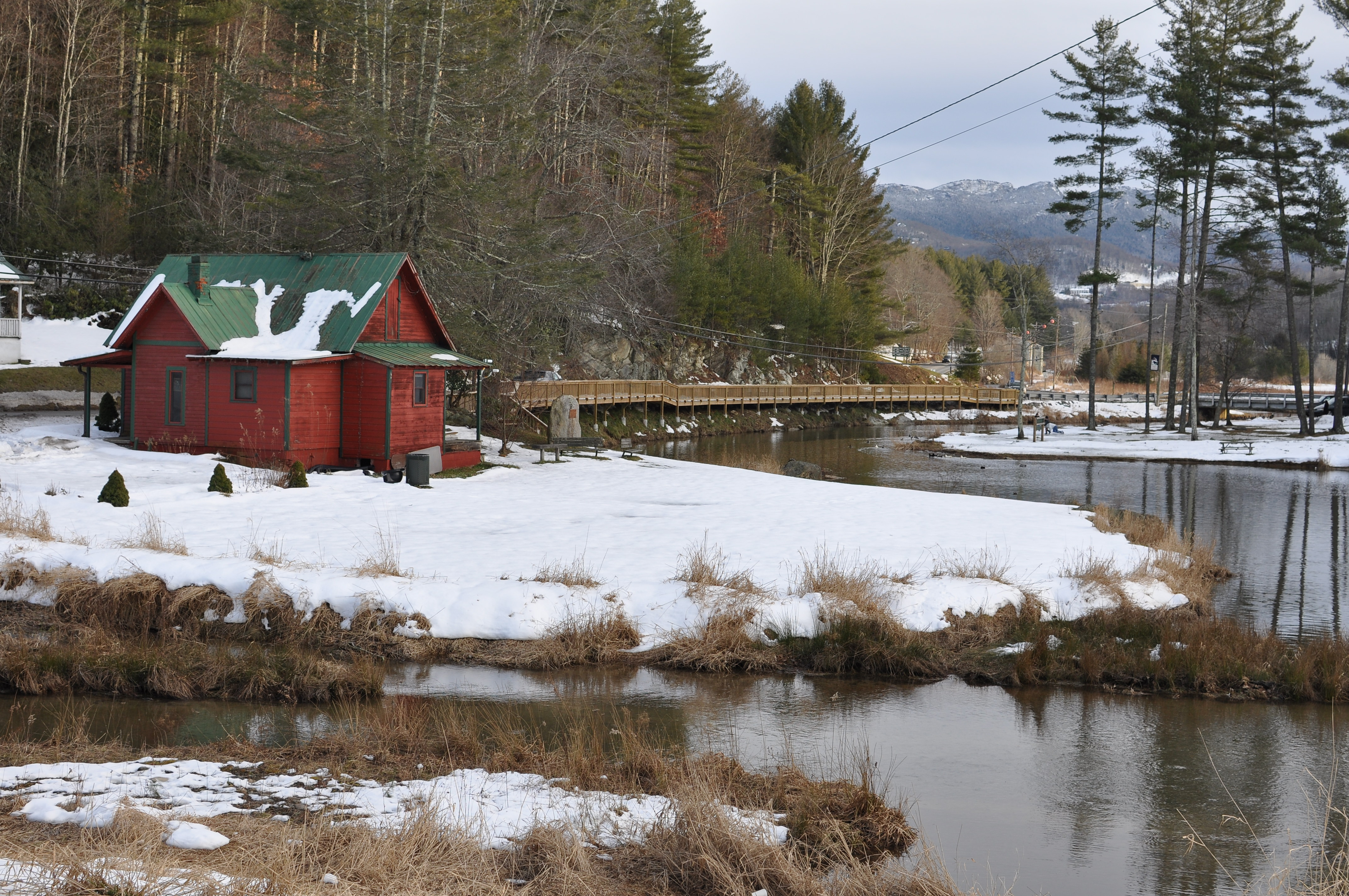
Mill Pond, where Shawneehaw Creek and the Elk River merge (2009-12-26)

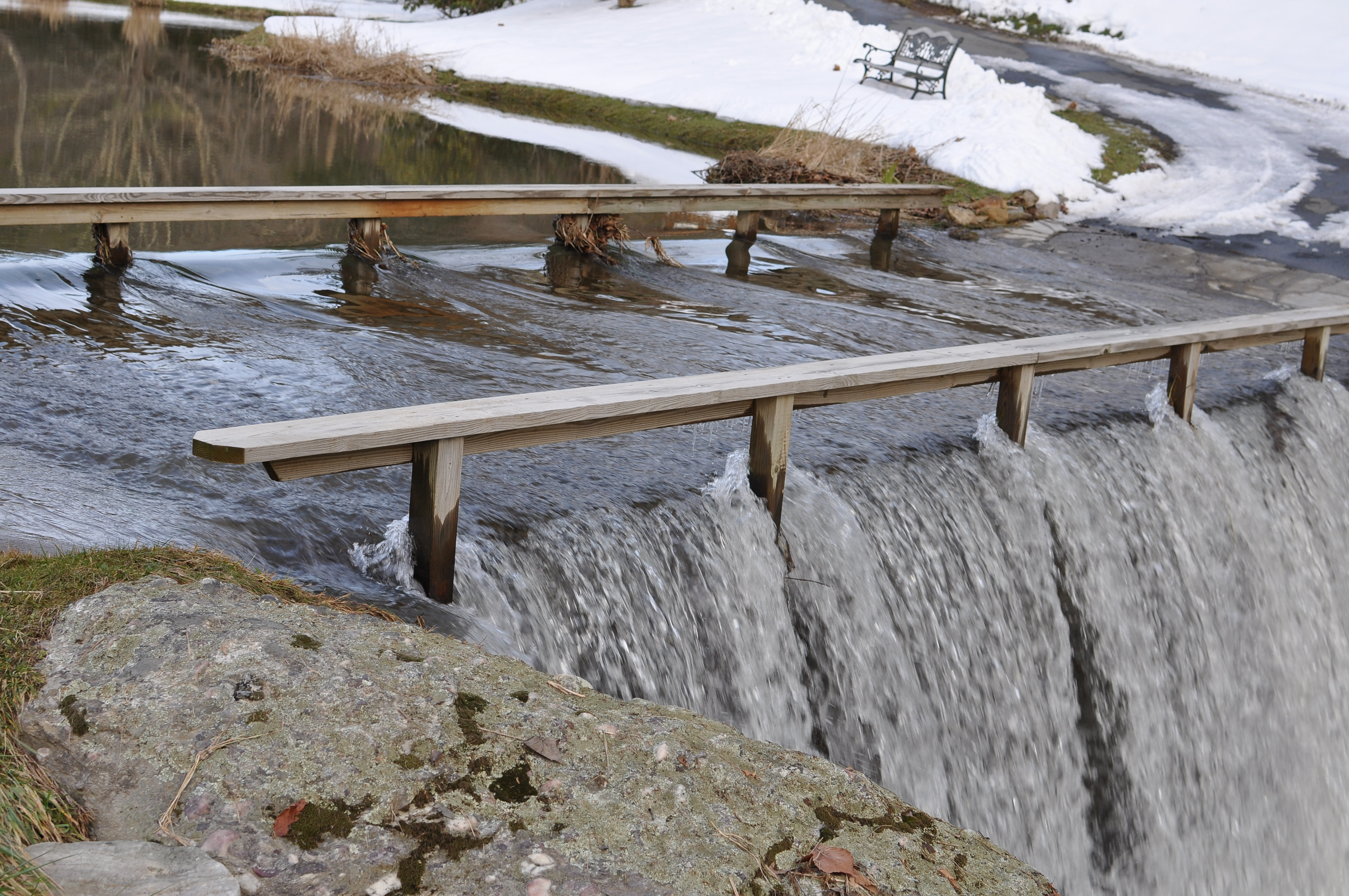
Bridge that fords Shawneehaw Creek (2009-12-26)

== See also ==
- Beech Mountain (North Carolina)
- Elizabethton, Tennessee
- Elk River (North Carolina)
- Roan Mountain, Tennessee
- Shawneehaw Creek
- Sugar Mountain (North Carolina)
- Watauga River
