= Beech Mountain, North Carolina =

- Town
- Seal
- Nickname: Beech
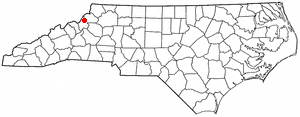
- Location of Beech Mountain, North Carolina
- Coordinates: 36°12′23″N 81°52′59″W
- Country: United States
- State: North Carolina
- Counties: Watauga, Avery
- Incorporated: 1981
- Named for: Beech Mountain

Area
  - Total: 6.49 sq mi (16.82 km^{2})
  - Land: 6.48 sq mi (16.78 km^{2})
  - Water: 0.012 sq mi (0.03 km^{2})
- Elevation: 4,354 ft (1,327 m)

Population (2020)
  - Total: 675
  - Density: 104.1/sq mi (40.21/km^{2})
- Time zone: UTC−5 (Eastern (EST))
  - Summer (DST): UTC−4 (EDT)
- ZIP code: 28604
- Area code: 828
- FIPS code: 37-04510
- GNIS feature ID: 2405226
- Website: www.townofbeechmountain.com

Beech Mountain is a town in both Avery and Watauga counties in the U.S. state of North Carolina. At the 2020 census, the town population was 675. The town is located atop Beech Mountain and is the highest town east of the Rocky Mountains at 5,506 ft (1,678 m) in elevation. The nearest municipality at a higher elevation is Des Moines, New Mexico, some 1,220 miles (1,960 kilometers) away.

The town relies heavily on tourism, with the population swelling as high as 5,000 in the summer, and to 10,000 during the peak of ski season. The abundance of outdoor activities, mild summer temperatures (compared to the rest of the southeast), and ski resort make it a popular location for people in the Carolinas, Georgia and Florida to own both summer and winter vacation homes.

== Geography ==
Beech Mountain is located in Avery and Watauga counties, North Carolina. According to the United States Census Bureau, the town has a total area of 6.7 sq mi (17.4 km^{2}), all land.

At an elevation of 5,506 feet (1,678 m), Beech Mountain is the highest incorporated community east of the Mississippi River. Beech Mountain Ski Resort is one of very few ski areas operating in the Southeastern United States.

== Demographics ==
Historical population
Census	Pop.	Note	%±
1990	239		—
2000	310		29.7%
2010	320		3.2%
2020	675		110.9%
U.S. Decennial Census

As of the census of 2000, there were 310 people, 145 households, and 95 families residing in the town. The population density was 46.6 inhabitants per square mile (18.0/km^{2}). There were 1,868 housing units at an average density of 280.8 units per square mile (108.4 units/km^{2}). The racial makeup of the town was 97.42% White, and 2.58% from two or more races. Hispanics or Latinos of any race were 0.97% of the population.

There were 145 households, out of which 15.9% had children under the age of 18 living with them, 59.3% were married couples living together and 33.8% were non-families. 21.4% of all households were made up of individuals, and 9.0% had someone living alone who was 65 years of age or older. The average household size was 2.14 and the average family size was 2.45.

The age distribution was 12.6% under the age of 18, 5.8% from 18 to 24, 24.8% from 25 to 44, 33.9% from 45 to 64, and 22.9% who were 65 years of age or older. The median age was 51 years. For every 100 females, there were 108.1 males. For every 100 females age 18 and over, there were 106.9 males.

The median income for a household in the town was $47,500, and the median income for a family was $52,813. Males had a median income of $32,031 versus $22,000 for females. The per capita income for the town was $26,799. About 2.8% of families and 8.5% of the population were below the poverty line, including none of those under the age of eighteen or sixty-five or over.

== Climate ==
Beech Mountain has a humid continental climate (Dfb), and is the coldest town in North Carolina as well as all of Southeastern US, with winters comparable to coastal New England and summers far cooler than the surrounding Piedmont and even other mountain towns. Summers are typically mild and rainy, with some cooler and warmer days sprinkled in. Winter temperatures are cold and very snowy, with daily highs around freezing and lows in the teens, though above freezing winter highs tend to keep the snowpack down.

Climate data for Beech Mountain (1991–2020 normals, extremes 1991–present)
Month	Jan	Feb	Mar	Apr	May	Jun	Jul	Aug	Sep	Oct	Nov	Dec	Year
Record high °F (°C)	64 (18)	67 (19)	76 (24)	77 (25)	78 (26)	81 (27)	85 (29)	80 (27)	79 (26)	77 (25)	77 (25)	64 (18)	83 (28)
Mean maximum °F (°C)	53.4 (11.9)	55.4 (13.0)	61.8 (16.6)	70.2 (21.2)	72.3 (22.4)	74.6 (23.7)	76.2 (24.6)	74.8 (23.8)	72.8 (22.7)	68.6 (20.3)	61.7 (16.5)	55.5 (13.1)	76.5 (24.7)
Mean daily maximum °F (°C)	34.8 (1.6)	36.9 (2.7)	43.4 (6.3)	53.3 (11.8)	60.7 (15.9)	65.9 (18.8)	68.9 (20.5)	67.7 (19.8)	63.4 (17.4)	55.0 (12.8)	45.6 (7.6)	38.8 (3.8)	52.9 (11.6)
Daily mean °F (°C)	27.4 (−2.6)	29.3 (−1.5)	35.6 (2.0)	44.9 (7.2)	53.3 (11.8)	59.8 (15.4)	63.1 (17.3)	61.9 (16.6)	57.0 (13.9)	47.8 (8.8)	38.3 (3.5)	31.6 (−0.2)	45.8 (7.7)
Mean daily minimum °F (°C)	20.0 (−6.7)	21.8 (−5.7)	27.7 (−2.4)	36.4 (2.4)	46.0 (7.8)	53.6 (12.0)	57.3 (14.1)	56.1 (13.4)	50.5 (10.3)	40.6 (4.8)	30.9 (−0.6)	24.4 (−4.2)	38.8 (3.8)
Mean minimum °F (°C)	−3.2 (−19.6)	2.7 (−16.3)	7.2 (−13.8)	18.0 (−7.8)	29.4 (−1.4)	42.6 (5.9)	49.7 (9.8)	48.8 (9.3)	38.1 (3.4)	23.0 (−5.0)	12.6 (−10.8)	4.7 (−15.2)	−5.4 (−20.8)
Record low °F (°C)	−18 (−28)	−15 (−26)	−10 (−23)	7 (−14)	18 (−8)	35 (2)	44 (7)	41 (5)	29 (−2)	16 (−9)	3 (−16)	−10 (−23)	−17 (−27)
Average precipitation inches (mm)	5.18 (132)	4.21 (107)	4.81 (122)	4.92 (125)	5.71 (145)	4.94 (125)	5.97 (152)	4.96 (126)	4.99 (127)	3.75 (95)	3.50 (89)	4.84 (123)	57.78 (1,468)
Average snowfall inches (cm)	16.6 (42)	16.5 (42)	13.0 (33)	4.4 (11)	0.1 (0.25)	0.0 (0.0)	0.0 (0.0)	0.0 (0.0)	0.0 (0.0)	0.6 (1.5)	2.1 (5.3)	13.2 (34)	66.5 (169)
Average precipitation days (≥ 0.01 in)	20.1	17.8	16.1	15.4	17.2	18.0	18.6	16.9	13.1	11.6	12.1	18.3	195.2
Average snowy days (≥ 0.1 in)	9.7	9.1	6.7	2.0	0.3	0.0	0.0	0.0	0.0	0.5	2.9	6.7	37.9
Source: NOAA

== Notable people ==
- Ray Hicks, Appalachian storyteller
- Frank Proffitt, banjoist

== See also ==
- Beech Mountain (geographical feature, with resort)
- Land of Oz (theme park)
- List of ski areas and resorts in the United States
