= Altamont, North Carolina =

Altamont
- Unincorporated community
- Location within the state of North Carolina
- Coordinates: 35°59′27″N 81°56′39″W
- Country: United States
- State: North Carolina
- County: Avery County
- Elevation: 3,268 ft (996 m)
- Time zone: UTC-5 (Eastern (EST))
  - Summer (DST): UTC-4 (EDT)
- ZIP code: 28657
- Area code: 828
- GNIS feature ID: 1018807

Altamont is an unincorporated community in Avery County, North Carolina, United States. The community is located along US 221/NC 194 (Linville Falls Highway), between the town of Crossnore and the community of Linville Falls. Altamont translates to "High Mountain."

The Ray Wiseman House was listed on the National Register of Historic Places in 1996.

== See also ==
- Linville River
