= Solar power in Tennessee =

Overview of solar power in the U.S. state of Tennessee

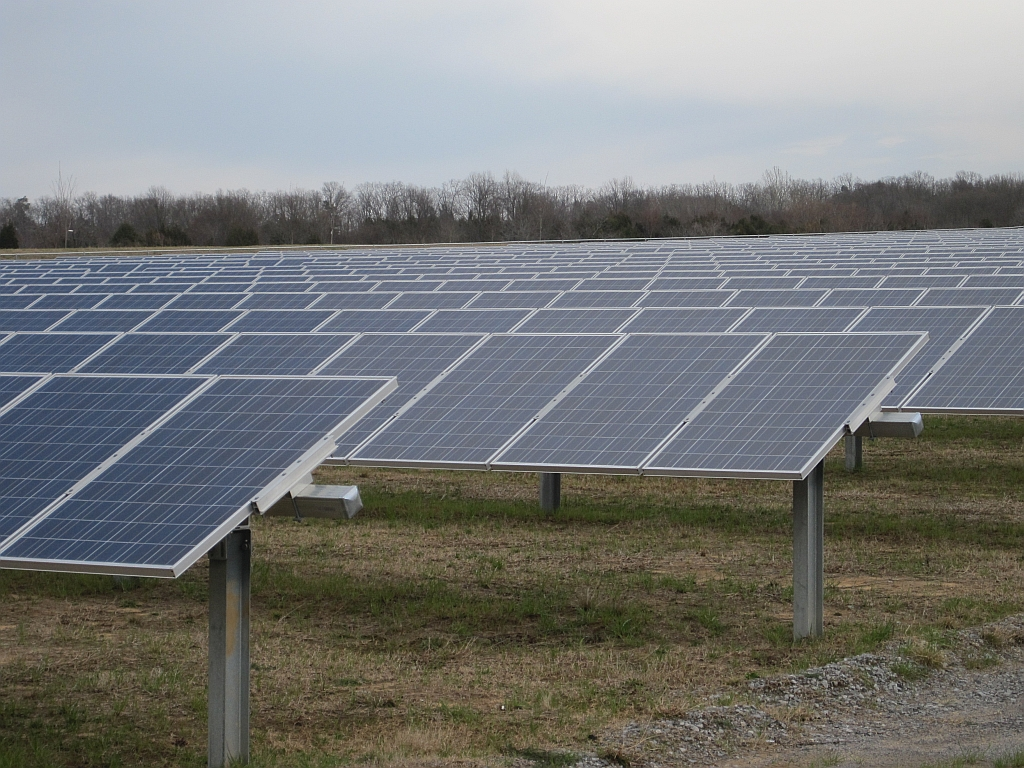
1 MW Shelby Farms Solar Farm

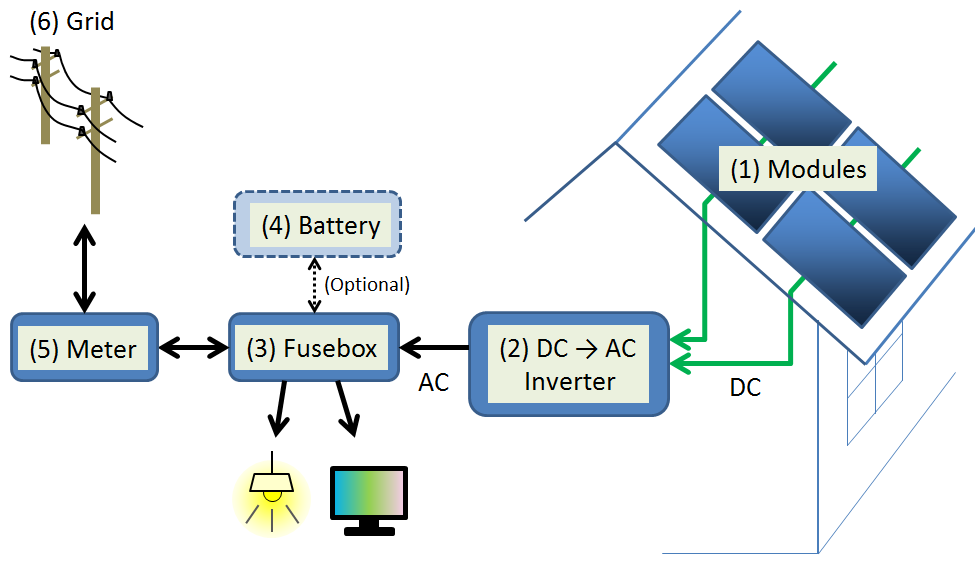
Simplified schematic of a grid-connected residential photovoltaics power system

Solar power in Tennessee is capable of producing much of the state's electricity; however, the industry remains in early stages in the state. With 129 MW of solar power in 2015, Tennessee ranked 20th among states for installed solar capacity.

In 2012, Tennessee's largest solar installation was the 5 MW West Tennessee Solar Farm.

In 2013, Volkswagen opened an 8 MW solar farm at its assembly plant in Chattanooga. The largest solar installations in Tennessee in 2014 were the 20 MW Selmer and 20 MW Mulberry Solar Farms in McNairy County.

In 2015, White Farms, a grain farm in rural Carroll County, installed a 49.725 kW solar array.

A 68.5 MW_{(DC)} (53 MW_{(AC)}) solar farm near Millington became the state's largest solar installation in 2019.

== Rooftop solar ==
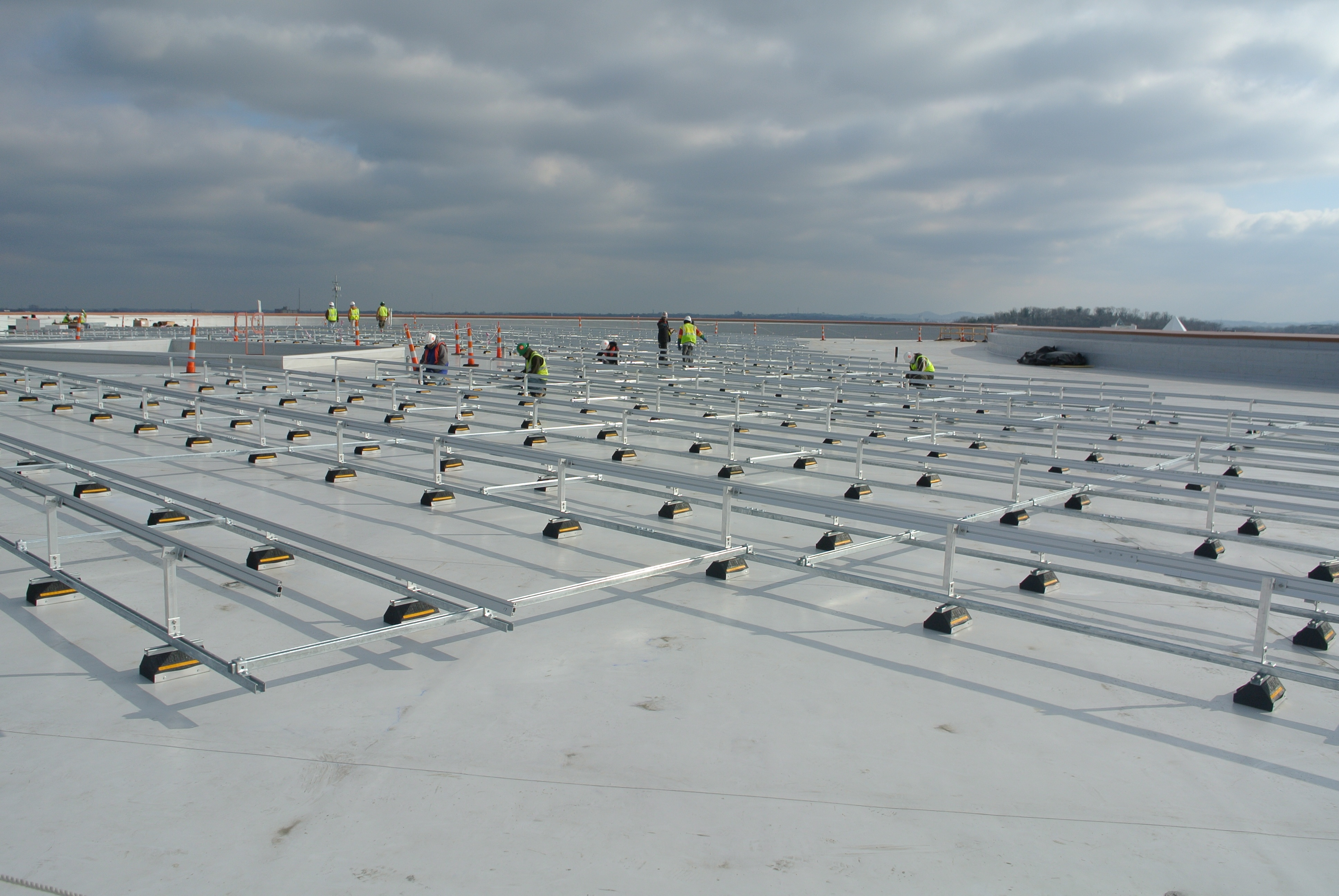
Solar panel installation, Music City Center

Photovoltaic panels installed on rooftops is estimated to be capable of producing 23% of all electricity used in Tennessee, with 16,000 MW of solar panels.

Federal law requires net metering upon request, but Tennessee is one of only four states without established policy, meaning that it needs to be negotiated with the utility. A more practical approach is to assume net metering by each utility. Net metering is simply an accounting procedure, and the only requirement is a bi-directional electric meter. Most meters are bi-directional. It is more practical for utilities to discover net metering instead of requiring registration and reporting, just as there is no registration or reporting requirement in connecting an air conditioner, which is instead discovered by utilities. Best practices call for perpetual roll over of kilowatt credits instead of converting to a monetary value.

A 2012 estimate suggested that a typical 5 kW system would pay for itself in about 14 years, and thereafter generate a net savings of $16,622 over the 25 year life of the system.

== Climate impact ==
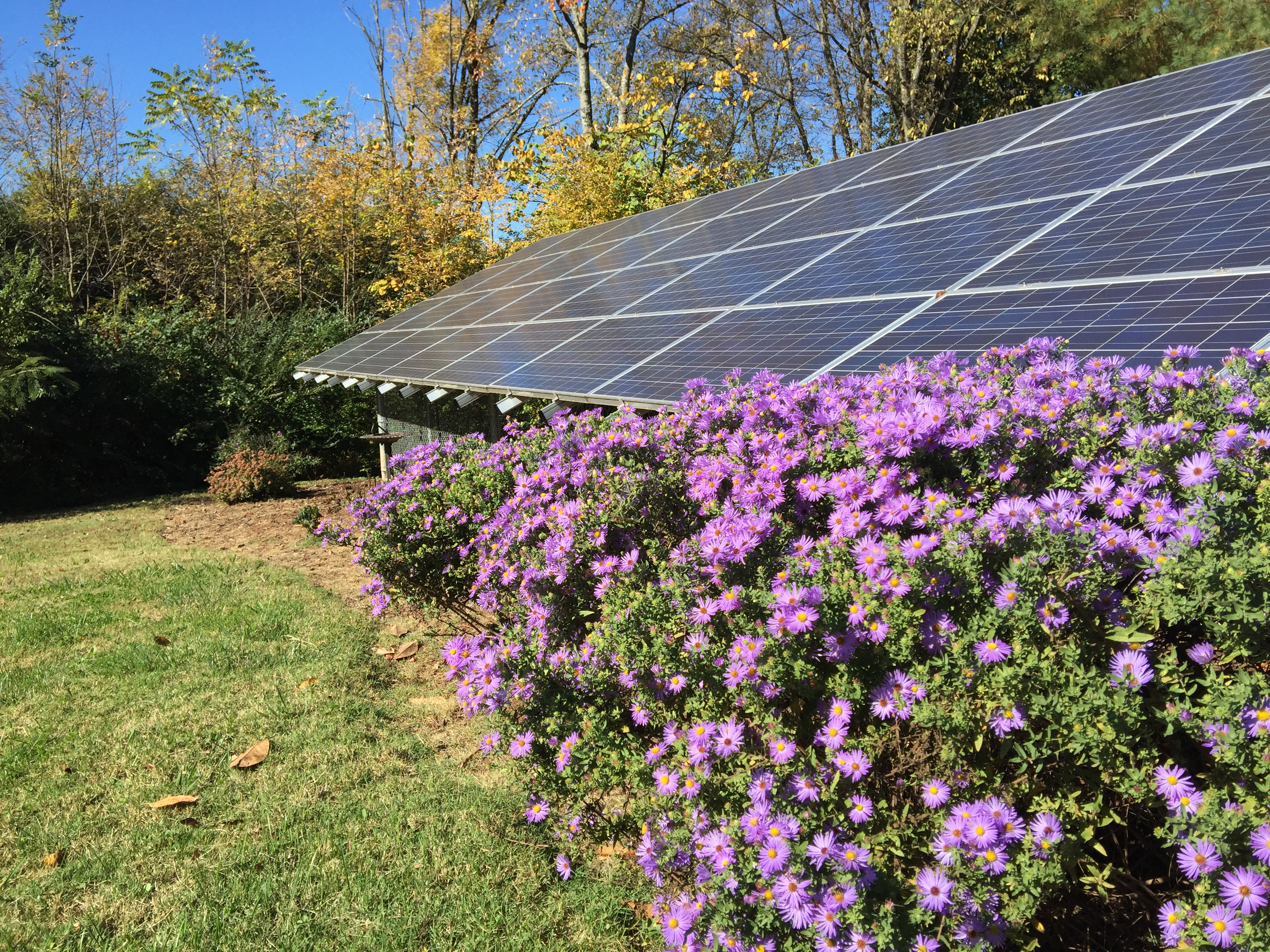
Solar installation, Knoxville

Solar power installations in Tennessee have a relatively high climate impact, because almost 25% of the state's electrical generation (as of 2021) comes from coal.

A Nashville-based startup, Clearloop, is targeting solar installations based on three criteria: “Where are the sunniest places? Where’s the grid the dirtiest? And where can a dollar invested in infrastructure go the longest way?” The company's first installation, in Jackson, has capacity to power about 200 homes. Clearloop plans to build additional installations based on investment by companies which want to transition to 100% renewable electricity or offset corporate emissions.

== Statistics ==
Source: NREL

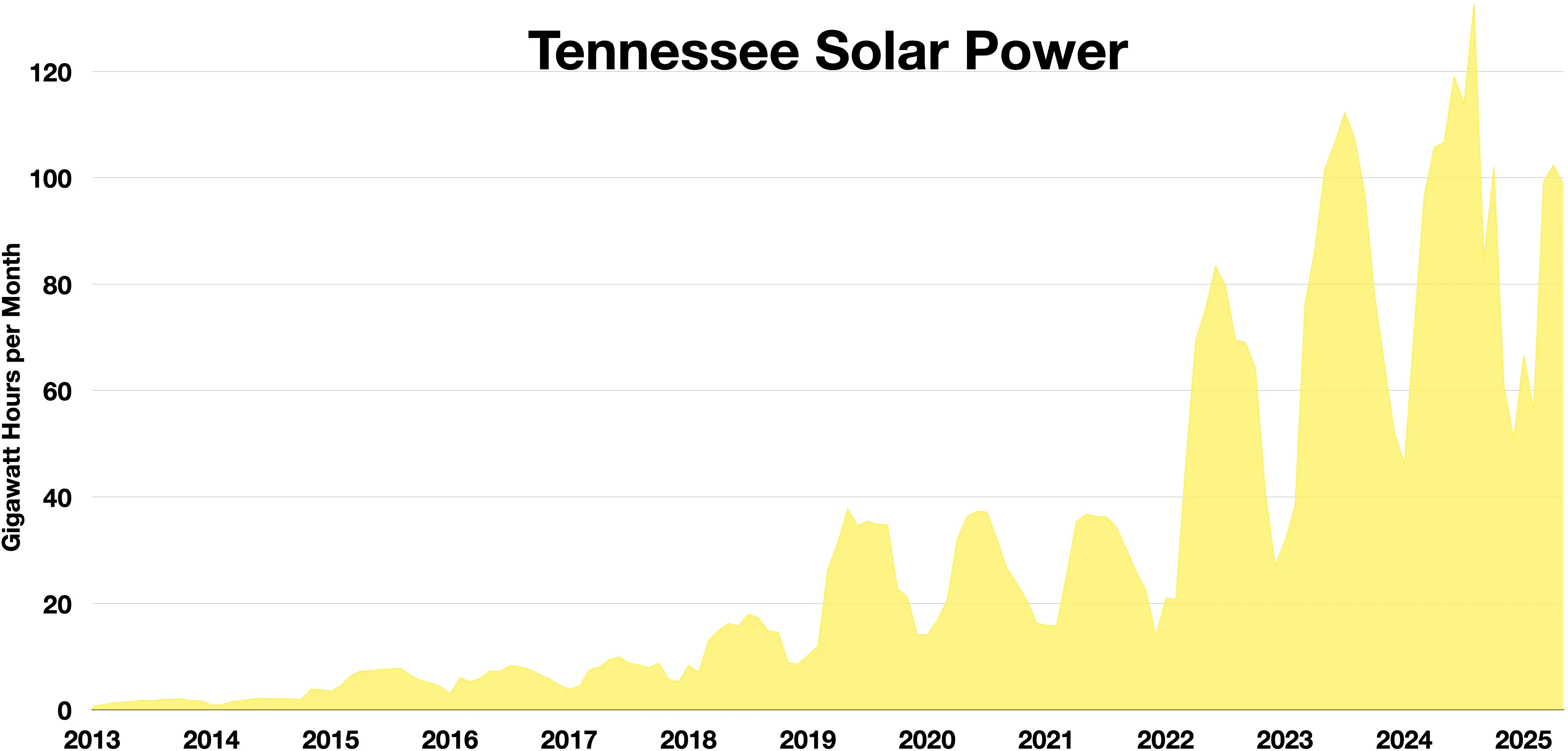
Tennessee solar power

Tennessee photovoltaics capacity (MWp)
Year	Capacity	Installed	% change
2007	0.4	0	0%
2008	0.4	0	0%
2009	0.9	0.5	125%
2010	5.7	4.8	533%
2011	22.0	16.3	286%
2012	45.0	23.0	105%
2013	64.8	19.8	44%
2014	110	45.2	70%
2015	129	19	17%
2016	163	34	26%
2017	230	67	41%
2018	262	32	14%
2019	350.8	88.8	34%
2020	356.1	5.3	1.5%
2021	367.9	11.8	%
2022	779	411.1	%

Utility-scale solar generation in Tennessee (GWh)
Year	Total	Jan	Feb	Mar	Apr	May	Jun	Jul	Aug	Sep	Oct	Nov	Dec
2013	21	1	1	1	2	2	2	2	2	2	2	2	2
2014	26	1	1	2	2	2	2	2	2	2	2	4	4
2015	79	4	5	7	8	8	8	8	8	7	6	5	5
2016	78	3	6	5	6	8	7	9	8	8	7	6	5
2017	91	4	5	8	8	10	10	9	9	8	9	6	5
2018	166	9	7	14	16	17	17	19	18	16	15	9	9
2019	327	11	12	27	33	39	36	37	36	36	23	22	15
2020	325	15	17	21	33	38	39	38	33	28	25	21	17
2021	245	17	17	27	36	38	37	37	36				

== See also ==
- Wind power in Tennessee
- Solar power in the United States
- Renewable energy in the United States
