= Crossnore School Historic District =

Historic school building in North Carolina, United States

- U.S. National Register of Historic Places
- U.S. Historic district
- Location within North Carolina Location within the United States
- Location: Within the campus of Crossnore School, N. side of NC 1143, opposite junction with NC 1148, Crossnore, North Carolina
- Coordinates: 36°1′24″N 81°55′47″W
- Area: 7.8 acres (3.2 ha)
- Built: 1928, 1933, 1936, 1951, 1956, 1960
- Built by: Franklin, William Erwin; Weaver, John R.
- Architectural style: Bungalow/craftsman, half-dovetail log building
- NRHP reference No.: 09000059
- Added to NRHP: February 18, 2009

Crossnore School Historic District is a historic school campus and national historic district located at Crossnore, Avery County, North Carolina. It encompasses four contributing buildings and one contributing structure and are the oldest surviving buildings associated with the school established here in 1913. The buildings were built between 1928 and 1960, and constructed of stone, frame, or log construction, and stand 1 1/2 or 2 stories in height. They are the Daughters of the American Revolution Dormitory / Cooper Building (1933, 1960), E.H. Sloop Chapel (1956), DAR Chapter House (1958-1959), Garrett Memorial Hospital / Edwin Guy Building (1928, 2006-2007), bell tower (1951, 1960), and the separately listed Weaving Room of Crossnore School (1936, 1986).

It was listed on the National Register of Historic Places in 2009. Crossnore is one of the approved schools supported by the Daughters of the American Revolution.
