= Elk River (North Carolina–Tennessee) =

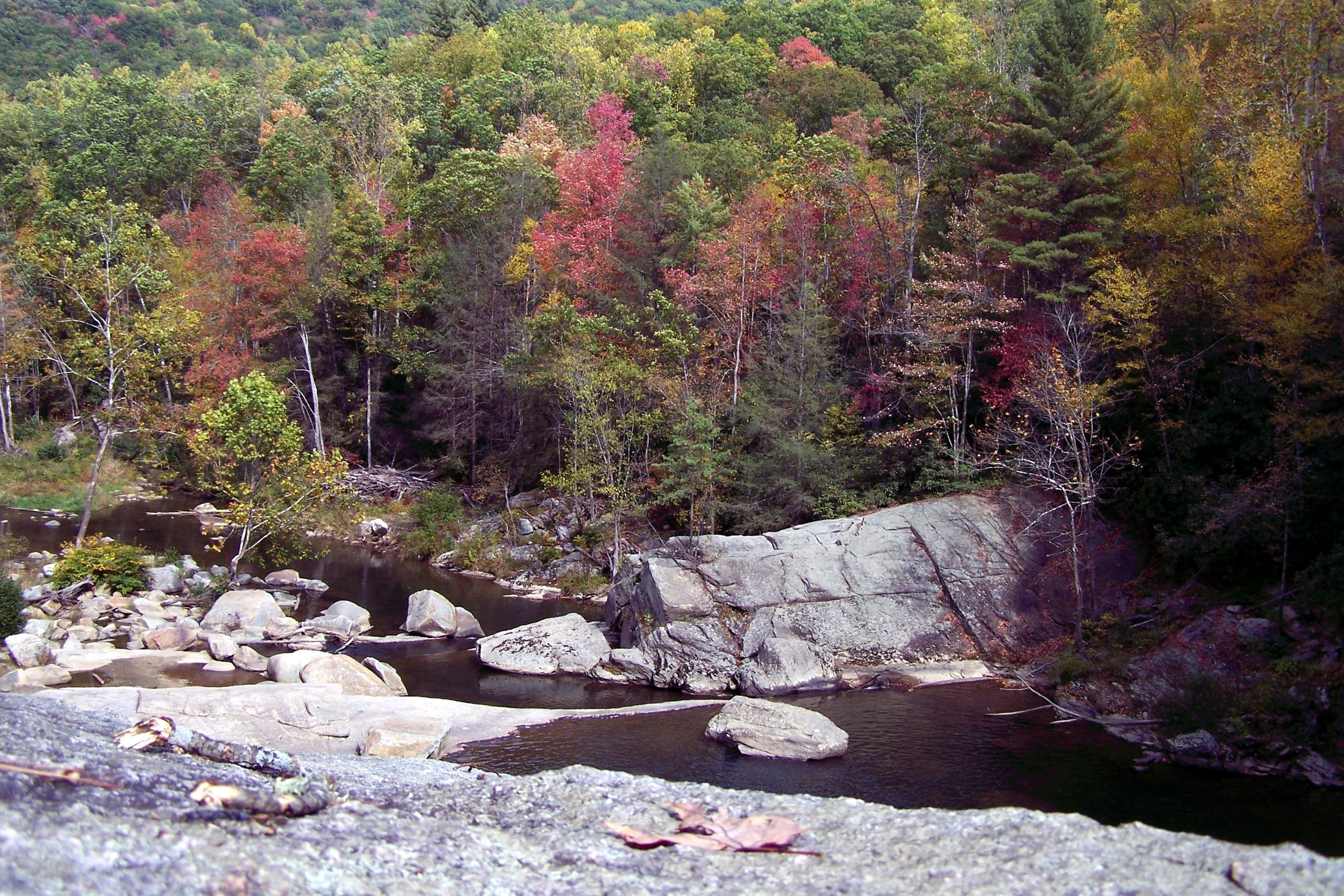
- Elk River in North Carolina

- Location of the mouth of Elk River in Tennessee

Location
- Country: United States
- States: North Carolina, Tennessee
- Counties: Avery NC, Carter TN

Physical characteristics
- Source: Hanging Rock Gap
  - location: Sugar Mountain, North Carolina
  - coordinates: 36°08′15″N 81°49′59″W
  - elevation: 4,389 ft (1,338 m)
- Mouth: Watauga River
  - location: Fish Springs, Tennessee
  - coordinates: 36°18′45″N 81°59′29″W
  - elevation: 1,952 ft (595 m)

Basin features
- Progression: Elk → Watauga → Holston → Tennessee → Ohio → Mississippi → Gulf of Mexico
- River system: Watauga River
- Tributaries
  - left: Flattop Creek, Sugar Creek, Wildcat Creek, Leroy Creek, Ramp Branch, Curtis Creek, Cranberry Creek, Little Elk Creek, Jones Branch, Sugar Hollow Branch, Little Laural Branch, Heaton Branch
  - right: Hanging Rock Creek, Shawneehaw Creek, Whitehead Creek, Horney Branch, Peavine Branch, Skalley Branch, Fall Creek, Nowhere Branch, Asher Branch
- Waterfalls: Elk River Falls

The Elk River is a large stream in the North Carolina High Country and East Tennessee. The headwaters begin from the Northwestern slopes of Peak Mountain in Avery County, North Carolina and end at the Watauga River in Carter County, Tennessee.

== Hydrography ==
With the headwaters beginning from the Northwestern slopes of Peak Mountain, it flows west to Banner Elk then towards Elk Park. For most of the river's course, it runs in a deep gorge. Just before the Elk River crosses into Tennessee it flows over "Big Falls" (also called "Elk Falls"), a locally-known attraction which is approximately a 60-foot (18 m) drop. It then flows down a narrow, relatively steep valley to the tiny community of Elk Mills, which is named for a former water-powered mill built on this river at this point by early white settlers. Between the state line and Elk Mills, it flows over Twisting Falls, a drop of approximately 30 feet (nine m). At this point, it is bridged by U.S. Highway 321. Shortly below this point, its waters become slack as part of an embayment of Watauga Lake, a sizable reservoir of the Watauga Dam Project of the Tennessee Valley Authority. This project has flooded the actual site of the original confluence of the Elk and Watauga rivers.

The water eventually flows through the Watauga River, the Holston River, the Tennessee River, the Ohio River, and the Mississippi River to the Gulf of Mexico.

For more information on waterfalls in the Elk River drainage, see Waterfalls of Tennessee by Gregory Plumb, ISBN 1-57072-057-6

== See also ==
- List of North Carolina rivers
- List of Tennessee rivers
