= Robert Chester and Elsie H. Lowe House =

Historic house in North Carolina, United States

- U.S. National Register of Historic Places
- Location within North Carolina Location within the United States
- Location: 1010 Shawneehaw Ave., Banner Elk, North Carolina
- Coordinates: 36°9′39″N 81°52′14″W
- Area: 26.56 acres (10.75 ha)
- Built: 1949
- Built by: Draughon, Larry; Ramsey, Lawrence
- Architect: Whitesell, Charles F.
- NRHP reference No.: 13000226
- Added to NRHP: May 1, 2013

Robert Chester and Elsie H. Lowe House is a historic home located at Banner Elk, Avery County, North Carolina. It was built in 1949, and is a 1 1/2-story, Minimal Traditional-style house. It has a cross-gable roofline, random-range quarry-faced stone walls, two tapered stone chimneys and a shed-roof porch. Also on the property are the contributing barn and corn crib (1949).

It was listed on the National Register of Historic Places in 2013.
