= Banner Elk Hotel =

- U.S. National Register of Historic Places
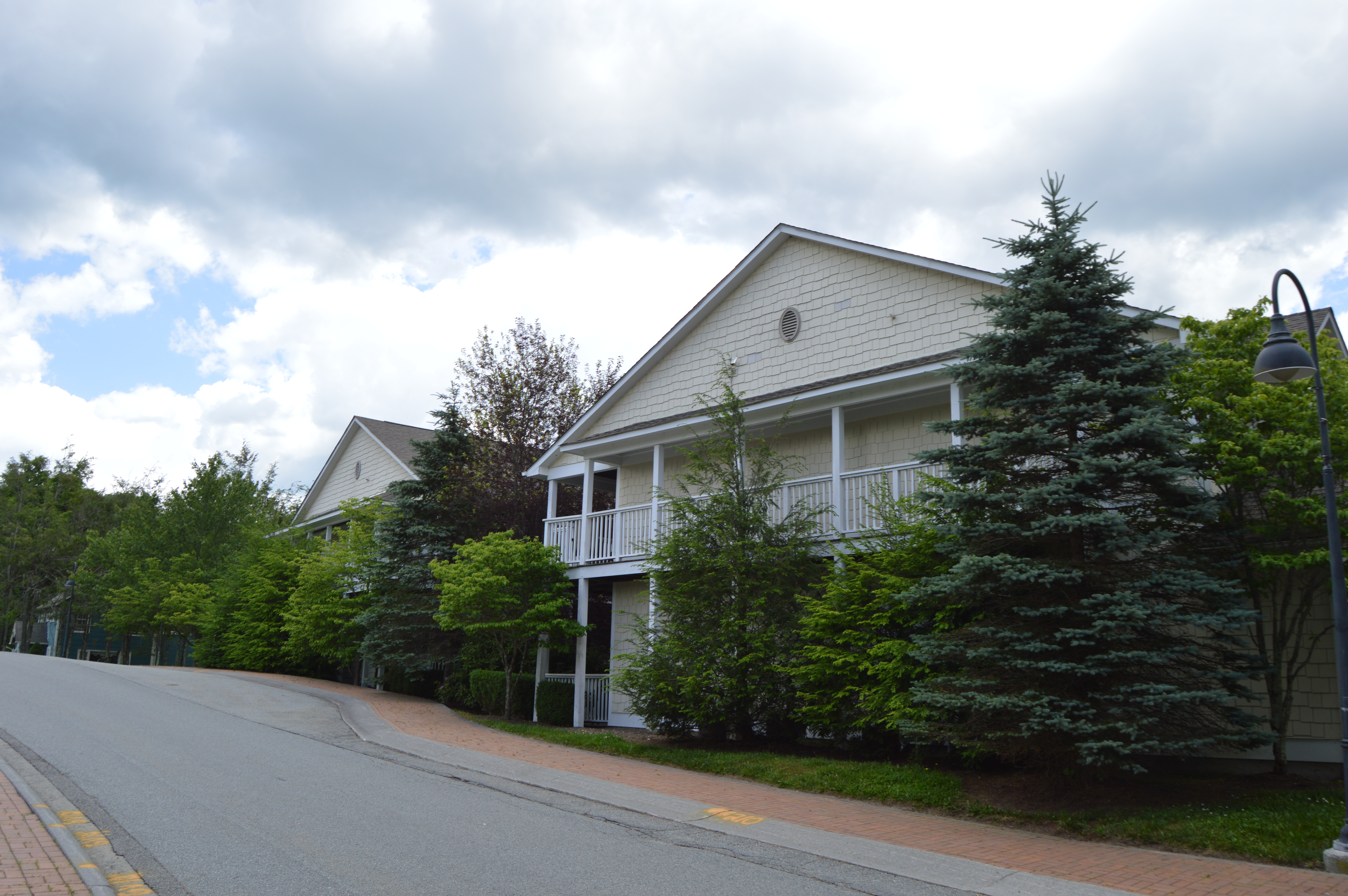
- Apartments on the site of the former hotel

- Location within North Carolina Location within the United States
- Location: 309 Banner St., Banner Elk, North Carolina
- Coordinates: 36°9′38″N 81°52′19″W
- Area: 2.7 acres (1.1 ha)
- Built: c. 1856, c. 1877-1891, c. 1891-1898
- NRHP reference No.: 00001182
- Added to NRHP: October 6, 2000

Banner Elk Hotel is a historic hotel building located at Banner Elk, Avery County, North Carolina. The original section of the hotel dates to about 1856, with expansions made between 1877 and 1891. Two-story rear wings and smaller additions were made between 1891 and 1898. It was originally built as a dwelling house, later expanded and converted for use as a hotel. It is a rambling, frame, U-shaped two-story building covered with weatherboard siding.

It was listed on the National Register of Historic Places in 2000. The hotel building has since been demolished.
