= Milligan Shuford Wise and Theron Colbert Dellinger Houses =

Historic house in North Carolina, United States

- U.S. National Register of Historic Places
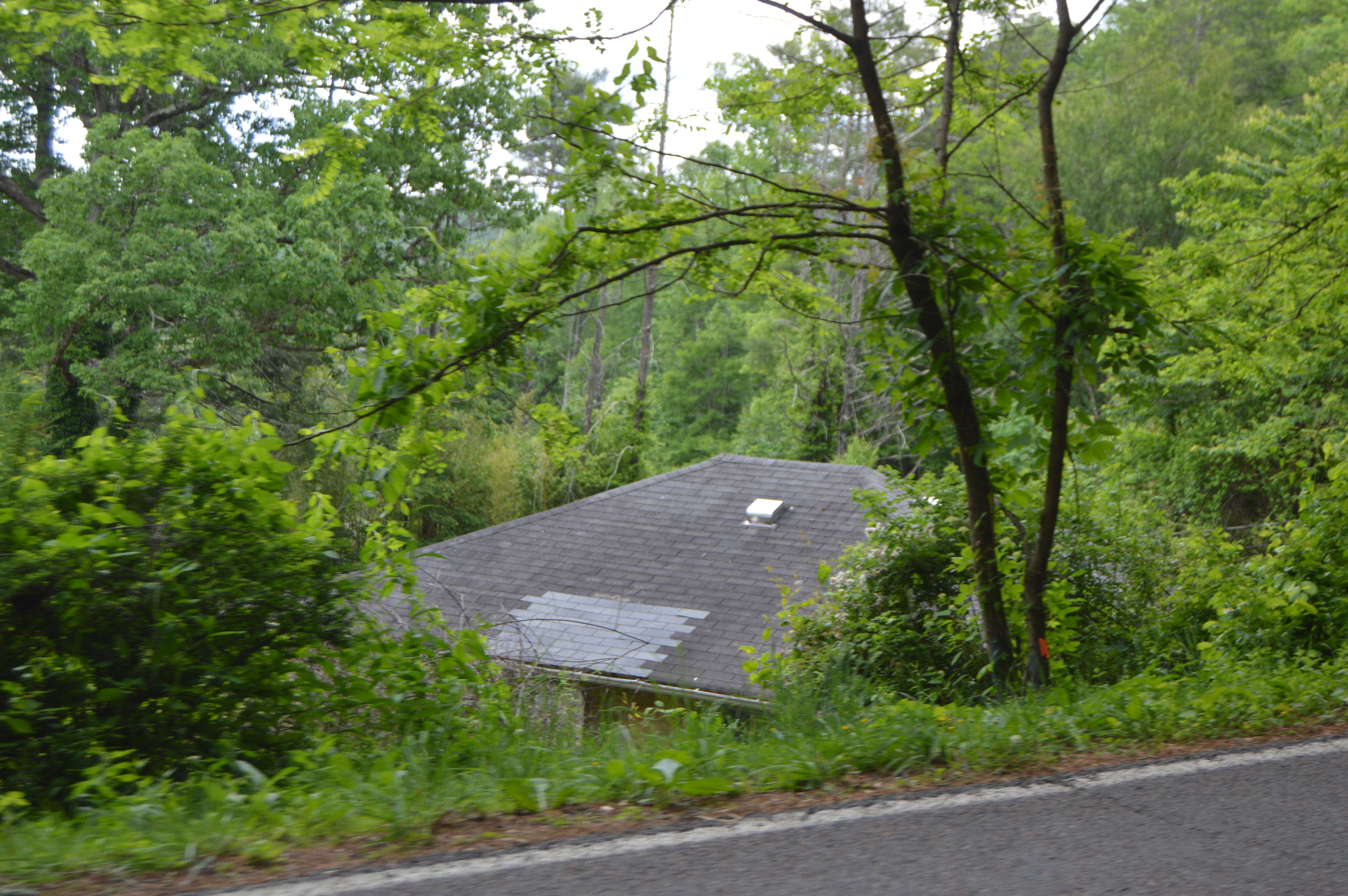
- Garage apartment

- Location within North Carolina Location within the United States
- Location: 152 and 158 Hemlock Ln., 142 Dellinger Rd., 110 Pine St., Crossnore, North Carolina
- Coordinates: 36°1′12″N 81°55′48″W
- Area: 6 acres (2.4 ha)
- Built: 1926, 1927, c. 1932–1935, c. 1941
- Built by: Milligan Shurford Wise; et al.
- Architectural style: Bungalow/craftsman
- NRHP reference No.: 08000811
- Added to NRHP: August 27, 2008

Milligan Shuford Wise and Theron Colbert Dellinger Houses is a set of two historic homes located at Crossnore, Avery County, North Carolina, United States. They were built in 1926 and 1927, and are rustic 1 1/2-story, frame American Craftsman-style houses. The Wise House is surrounded by contributing landscaping. Also on the property are a contributing garage apartment (c. 1932–1935) and stone one-story Wise Cottage (c. 1941).

It was listed on the National Register of Historic Places in 2008.
