= Elk Park School =

Historic school building in North Carolina, United States

- U.S. National Register of Historic Places
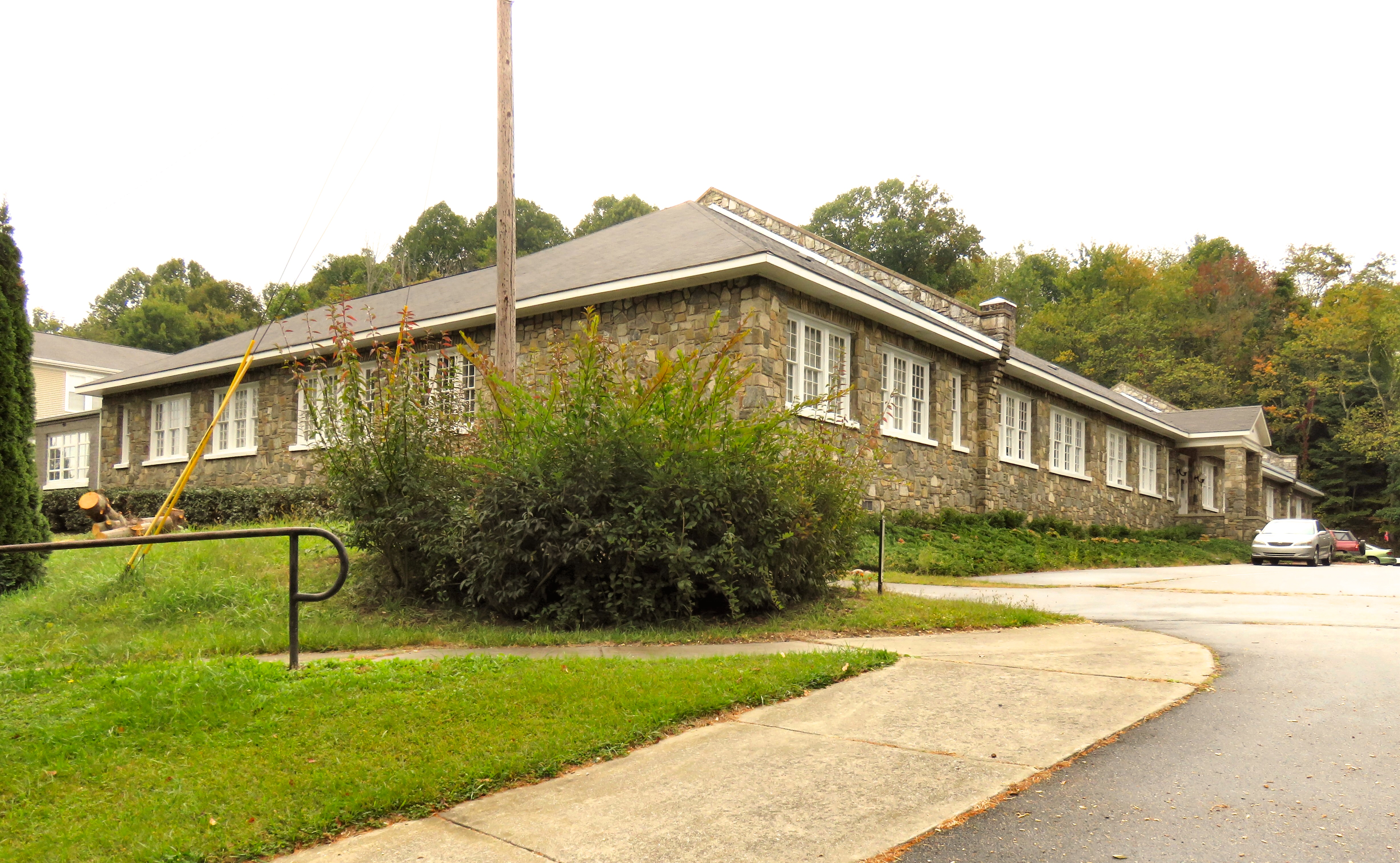

- Location within North Carolina Location within the United States
- Location: 253 Elk Park School Rd., Elk Park, North Carolina
- Coordinates: 36°9′41″N 81°58′49″W
- Area: 2 acres (0.81 ha)
- Built: 1935-1938, 1951
- Built by: Works Progress Administration
- Architectural style: Rustic Revival
- NRHP reference No.: 05001410
- Added to NRHP: December 16, 2005

Elk Park School is a historic school building located at Elk Park, Avery County, North Carolina. It was built between 1935 and 1938 by the Works Progress Administration. It is a one-story, E-shaped Rustic Revival-style stone building. It measures 16 bays wide and has a large gymnasium ell. A one-story, concrete block cafeteria addition was built in 1951. Scenes from the 1974 movie "Where The Lilies Bloom" were filmed in Elk Park School, and children from the elementary school appeared as extras in those scenes. It remained in use as a school until the end of the 20th century, then converted in 2004 to apartments.

It was listed on the National Register of Historic Places in 2005.
