= Ray Wiseman House =

Historic house in North Carolina, United States

- U.S. National Register of Historic Places
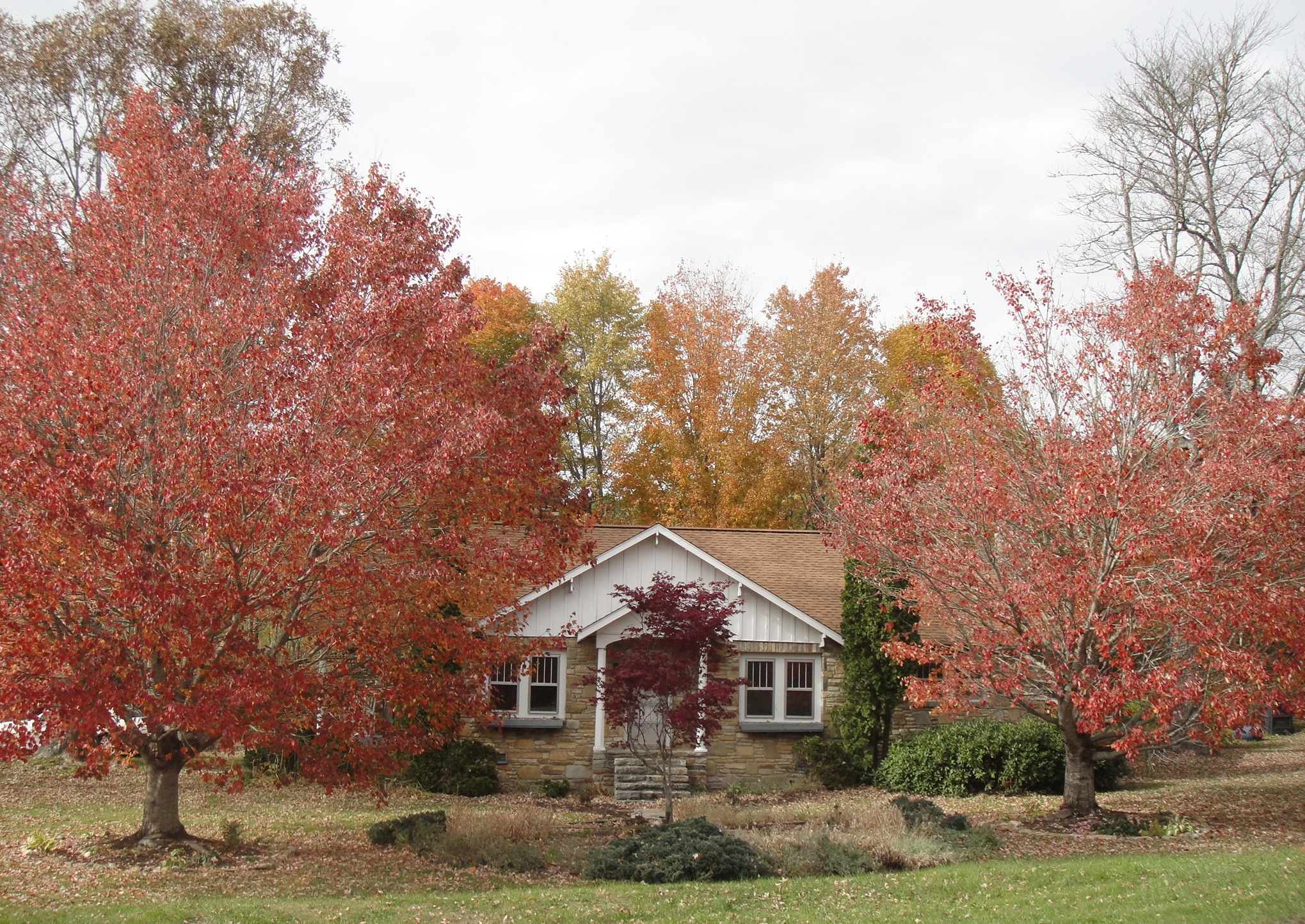

- Location within North Carolina Location within the United States
- Location: 7540 Linville Falls Hwy., Altamont, North Carolina
- Coordinates: 35°59′34″N 81°56′34″W
- Area: 1 acre (0.40 ha)
- Built: 1941
- Built by: Franklin, Ernest and Clingman; Davenport, Gordon
- Architectural style: Bungalow/craftsman
- NRHP reference No.: 96001397
- Added to NRHP: November 29, 1996

Ray Wiseman House is a historic home located at Altamont, Avery County, North Carolina. It was built in 1941, and is a one-story, Arts-and-Crafts bungalow-reflecting the American Craftsman influence. It is considered one of the best examples of Arts and Crafts architecture in the region. The home is a good example of an upper-middle-class home of the 1940s. The interior includes well crafted chestnut woodwork and red oak floors. The floor plan includes two large bedroom suites with a private sunroom for one and a large attic/loft space with enclosed stairway. The sun room still features rare 1940's original wall paper. The original plumbing fixtures stamped (1941) can still be found in the original main bathroom off the center hall and a modern second bathroom has been added to the master bedroom. It is constructed of native river rock and is approximately 1,400 square feet. It sits on 1.5 acres of land carved out of hills to form the original roadbed for the highway in front of the property.

It was listed on the National Register of Historic Places in 1996.
