= Beech Mountain (North Carolina) =

Mountain in North Carolina, United States

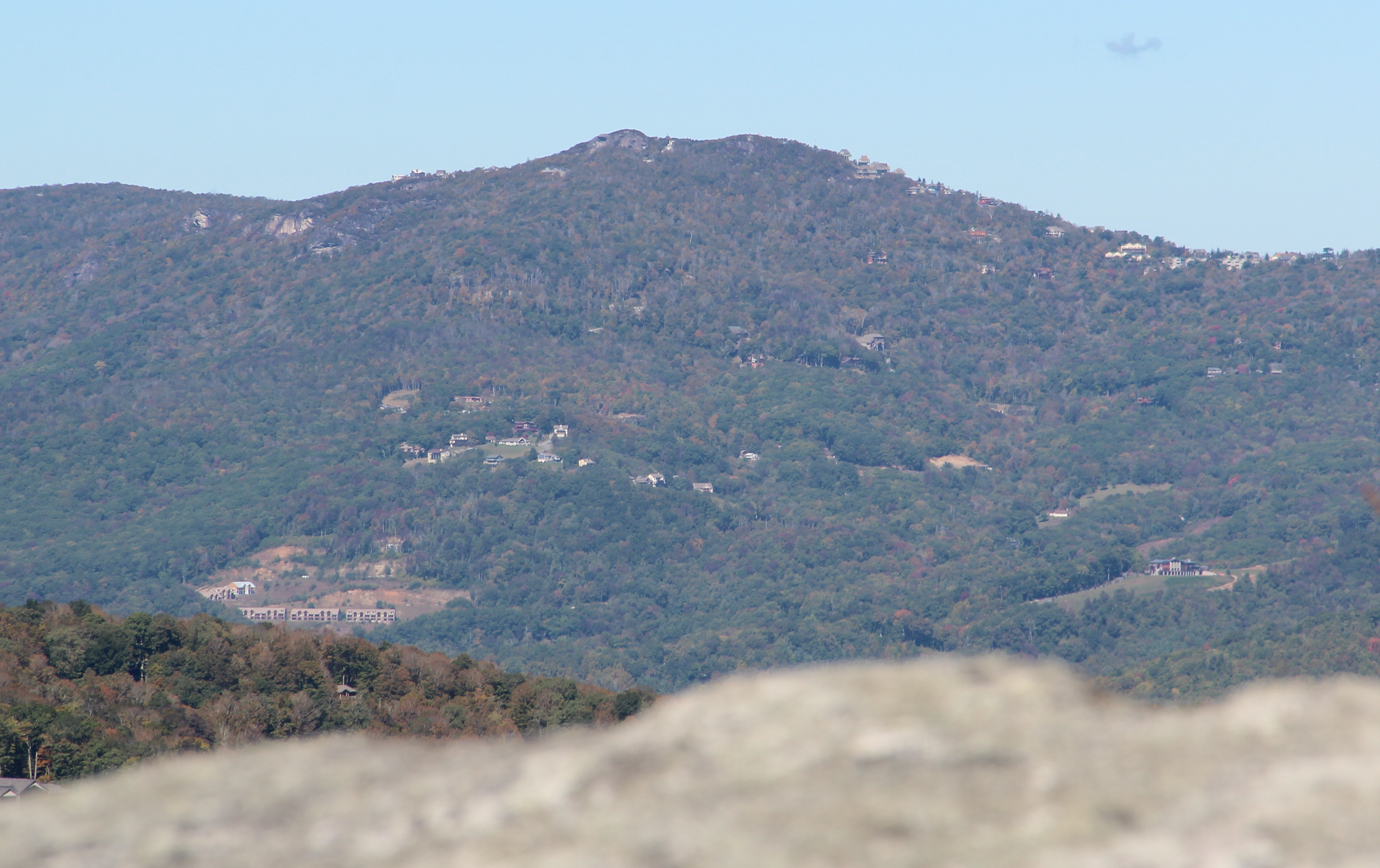
- Beech Mountain seen from Grandfather Mountain

Highest point
- Elevation: 5,506 ft (1,678 m)
- Prominence: 1,520 ft (460 m)
- Coordinates: 36°11′02″N 81°52′53″W

Geography
- Location within North Carolina
- Location: Avery County, North Carolina, U.S.
- Parent range: Blue Ridge Mountains
- Topo map: USGS Elk Park

Beech Mountain is a mountain in the North Carolina High Country and wholly in the Pisgah National Forest. Its elevation reaches 5,506 feet (1,657 m) and generates feeder streams for the Elk River. Nestled on the top is the Town of Beech Mountain.

== Recreation ==
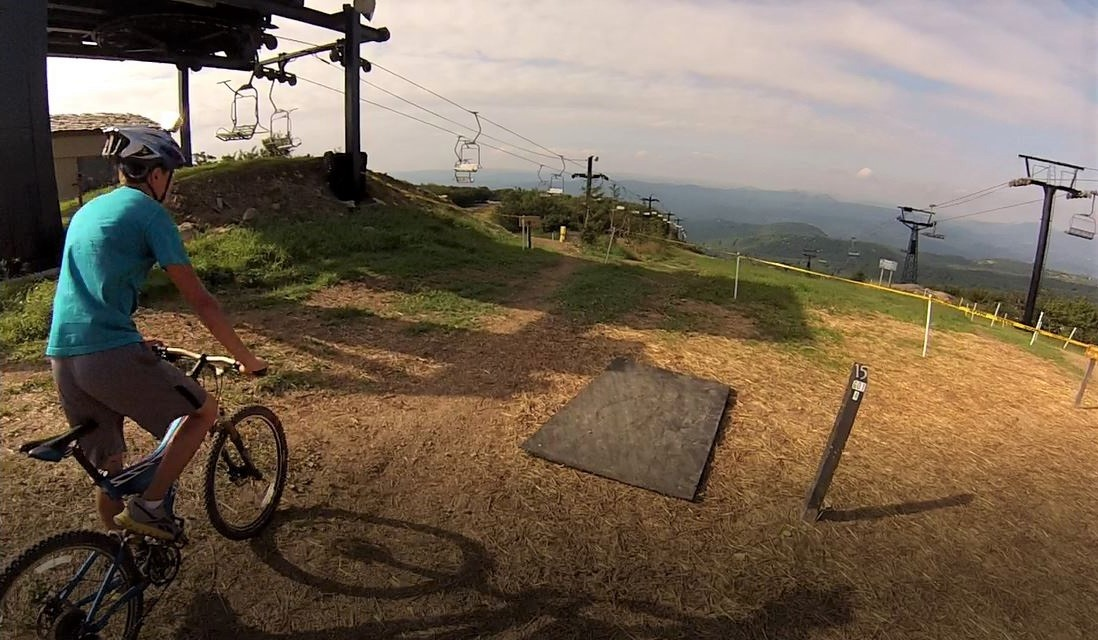
View after getting off chairlift for a downhill mountain bike run.

Mountain bikers on Beech Mountain. (short video).

Beech Mountain offers skiing, snowboarding, and tubing in the winter months. In the summer, recreation includes hiking and mountain biking. Beech Mountain Resort runs chairlifts for downhill mountain biking.

One of the more interesting walking areas is the defunct Land of Oz theme park, which existed briefly in the 1970s; remnants of the park can be visited today.

== See also ==
- List of mountains in North Carolina
