= Crossnore Presbyterian Church =

Historic church in North Carolina, United States

- U.S. National Register of Historic Places
- Location within North Carolina Location within the United States
- Location: 200 Chapel Dr., Crossnore, North Carolina
- Coordinates: 36°1′5″N 81°55′47″W
- Area: 0 acres (0 ha)
- Built: 1924–1926
- Built by: Franklin, William Erwin
- Architectural style: Bungalow/Craftsman
- NRHP reference No.: 96000206
- Added to NRHP: March 1, 1996

Crossnore Presbyterian Church is a historic Presbyterian church on US 221/NC 194 east side, opposite the junction with Dellinger Road in Crossnore, Avery County, North Carolina. It was built between 1924 and 1926, and is a one-story, "T"-plan rock building with American Craftsman influences. Also on the property is a contributing stone arch (c. 1926) and non-contributing church cemetery established about 1929.

It was listed on the National Register of Historic Places in 1996.
