= Crossnore, North Carolina =

Town in North Carolina, United States

- Town
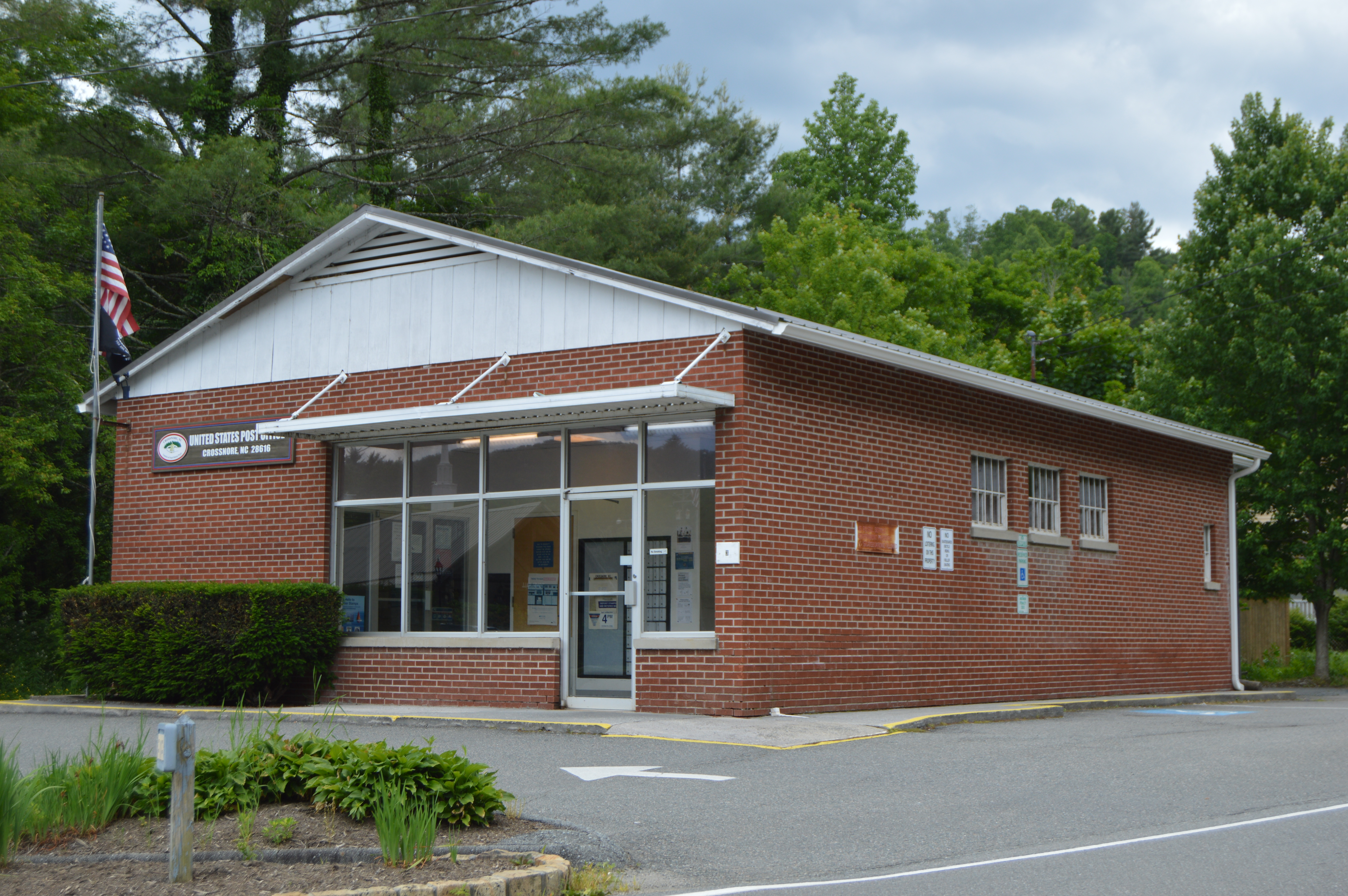
- Crossnore post office

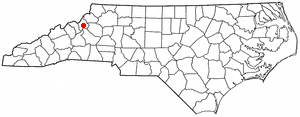
- Location of Crossnore, North Carolina
- Coordinates: 36°01′20″N 81°55′51″W
- Country: United States
- State: North Carolina
- County: Avery
- Named for: George Crossnore

Government
  - Type: Mayor-alderman
  - Mayor: Eddie Yarber

Area
  - Total: 0.45 sq mi (1.16 km^{2})
  - Land: 0.45 sq mi (1.16 km^{2})
  - Water: 0 sq mi (0.00 km^{2})
- Elevation: 3,360 ft (1,020 m)

Population (2020)
  - Total: 143
  - Density: 319.4/sq mi (123.32/km^{2})
- Time zone: UTC-5 (Eastern (EST))
  - Summer (DST): UTC-4 (EDT)
- ZIP code: 28616
- Area code: 828
- FIPS code: 37-15580
- GNIS feature ID: 2406340

Crossnore is a town in Avery County, North Carolina, United States. The population was 143 at the 2020 census.

== Geography ==
According to the United States Census Bureau, the town has a total area of 0.4 square miles (1.0 km^{2}), all land.

== History ==
The Crossnore Presbyterian Church, Crossnore School Historic District, Weaving Room of Crossnore School, and Milligan Shuford Wise and Theron Colbert Dellinger Houses are listed on the National Register of Historic Places.

== Demographics ==
Historical population
Census	Pop.	Note	%±
1930	181		—
1940	266		47.0%
1950	240		−9.8%
1960	277		15.4%
1970	264		−4.7%
1980	297		12.5%
1990	271		−8.8%
2000	242		−10.7%
2010	192		−20.7%
2020	143		−25.5%
U.S. Decennial Census

As of the census of 2000, there were 242 people, 96 households, and 62 families residing in the town. The population density was 548.8 inhabitants per square mile (211.9/km^{2}). There were 119 housing units at an average density of 269.9 per square mile (104.2/km^{2}). The racial makeup of the town was 93.80% White, 0.41% African American, 4.13% Native American, and 1.65% from two or more races. Hispanic or Latino of any race were 4.55% of the population.

== Education ==
A group home named The Crossnore School, Inc., was established in 1913 and now houses approximately 100 students. Crossnore School has been praised for providing high-quality care at a lower cost than typical for most orphanages.

== Notable people ==
- Tommy Burleson, former NBA player, played on 1974 NC State national championship team and 1972 USA Olympic team
- Virginia Foxx, member of the United States House of Representatives for North Carolina's 5th congressional district
- Mary T. Martin Sloop#:~:text=References-,Mary T. Martin Sloop,-Add languages, advocate for the community and betterment of local children.
