= Land of Oz (theme park) =

Amusement park in North Carolina, United States

- Interactive map of Land of Oz
- Location: Beech Mountain, North Carolina, U.S.
- Coordinates: 36.1853°N 81.8804°W
- Status: Operating
- Opened: 1970
- Owner: Emerald Mountain, Inc.
- Operating season: Weekly in June, First Weekend of September, October
- Area: 17.82 acres (72,100 m^{2})

Attractions
- Roller coasters: 0
- Water rides: 0
- Website: www.landofoznc.com

The Land of Oz is a theme park based on L. Frank Baum's Land of Oz books, located in the resort town of Beech Mountain, North Carolina, US. Carolina Caribbean Corporation opened it in 1970. Designed by Jack Pentes, the park was fully operational until 1980.

== History ==
=== Construction ===
Brothers Harry and Grover Robbins in 1965 began looking for a way to turn ski resort Beech Mountain into a year-round attraction. Finding an area that reminded them of the 1939 film The Wizard of Oz, the brothers began work on an Oz based theme park. They had over 44,000 bricks glazed yellow. The songs that were lip-synced by the characters on the Yellow Brick Road and at Emerald City were composed by notables Alec Wilder and North Carolina native Loonis McGlohon (with the exception of E.Y. Harburg and Harold Arlen's "Over the Rainbow" for which rights were obtained to integrate into the Emerald City show).

=== Opening ===
Land of Oz opened on June 15, 1970, with actress Debbie Reynolds cutting the ribbon with her daughter Carrie Fisher. 400,000 people visited the first year. Employees included nine Dorothys, four scarecrows, four tin men, four witches and five cowardly lions. A ski lift was specially designed to become the hot air balloon ride. In later years, characters from the story conducted tours, but the original design was for the visitor to assume the role of Dorothy – experiencing everything from Kansas to tornado to the meeting the characters on the yellow brick road to Oz. The visit culminated in Emerald City, where Dorothy appeared with her friends to meet the Wizard.

Visitors would start off in Kansas, "experience" the tornado that struck Dorothy's house, and walk down the Yellow Brick Road to visit with the Scarecrow, Tin Woodman, Cowardly Lion, and Wicked Witch of the West. The original Emerald City consisted of gift shops and an amphitheater where the Magic Moment Show would be staged every half hour. An artificial balloon ride, a specially modified ski lift installed by Goforth Brothers, allowed visitors to get a bird's-eye view of the park and mountain scenery before leaving Oz. A small museum showcased props and costumes from the MGM film, including one of Judy Garland's Dorothy dresses. This was jointly bought by the park and Debbie Reynolds from MGM.

The park was the top attraction in the Eastern United States the first year. Its opening day in 1970 attracted 4,000 visitors. Dampened by the death of owner Grover Robbins a few months before the park opened, the driving force to keep the park as a special experience gave way to commercial necessities foisted on Carolina Caribbean Corp (CCC) by the downturn in real estate sales. A failed investment in St. Croix left CCC bankrupt the latter part of 1975.

=== Closure ===
On Sunday, December 28, 1975, the Emerald City Amphitheater and surrounding gift shops caught on fire. Two buildings were destroyed, along with the park's offices, costumes, sound equipment, and props. At the same time, many items were stolen from the park's museum, including Judy Garland's Dorothy dress and the gatekeeper's jacket. Land of Oz would be rebuilt and managed by a new company, but it never recouped. Some reports state that the quality of the original park was not recaptured, and the cost to restore the park was deemed too high. It would finally close in 1980.

After the park was closed, much of it fell into disrepair. Props were vandalized, stolen, or left exposed to the elements. Some of the park was saved, including most of the yellow brick road, a few Munchkin houses, some of the later costumes, and sections of the Witch's castle. A video and display of The Land of Oz were on exhibit at the Appalachian Cultural Museum, part of Appalachian State University, in Boone, North Carolina but the museum closed and the artifacts were returned to the park.

=== Re-opening ===
On July 4, 1991, the park was reopened for the day as part of the town of Beech Mountain's Independence Day celebration and as a kickoff to the redevelopment of the property into a condo complex. Visitors rode the ski lift up from the base of the adjacent Ski Beech. Watauga High School in nearby Boone had staged a production of The Wizard of Oz as its spring musical a few months earlier and the student actors appeared in character and in costume to greet visitors as they came off the ski lift. Visitors then made their way to Dorothy's house, which was then the home of the property's owner, Alex Hufty Hays, and viewed a collection of original costumes and props from the 1939 movie. A year or so prior to this event, Appalachian State University in Boone opened its Appalachian Cultural Museum, which featured props and costumes from the theme park. The floor in this portion of the museum was paved with surplus yellow bricks that had been donated by their manufacturer, Sanford Brick, which had been made for the park but never used.

The owners of the land began restoring portions of the park over the following years. In the mid-nineties, the Autumn at Oz event began as a reunion for original park employees. This quickly grew in popularity as an annual public event, and by 2009 the festival had over 8,500 people attending. The event has expanded to include all of the characters from The Wizard of Oz, shows, Museum, Emerald City set up, Omaha Vendor Fair, Petting Zoo, Pony Rides, and other activities within the Oz Theme. Money raised during this event go back into renovations and upkeep of the park, as well as adding new attractions each year.

In 2011, the park hosted the International Wizard of Oz Club and some of the original 1970 cast returned to share photos and tales from the original inspiration of Jack Pentes. By 2013, the Land of Oz expanded openings to include "Journey with Dorothy," a guided tour through Oz every Friday in June during Beech Mountain's Family Fun Month. In 2018, it was announced a new yearly event is to be introduced.

Urban explorers often visit the park, shooting photos near or stealing relics from the site, including pieces of the yellow brick road.

Guests of honor include several of the original Munchkin actors, Oz historian, author & photographer; Gregory Hugh Leng and Oz Museum owner, Fred Trust.

The park has an annual Autumn of Oz event. Also, in June 2018, the park was scheduled to open for tours led by Dorothy, with some guests playing other characters, on Fridays and on June 30.

As of September 2019, it opened for Fridays in June for "Journey with Dorothy Tours" and in September for Autumn at Oz – the largest Wizard of Oz festival in the country.

For the 80th anniversary of the 1939 movie, the park was open on Thursdays and Fridays in June 2019, plus the last Wednesday in June and the first Friday in July.

As of 2024 the Land of Oz theme park opened in September for only three weekends for the annual Autumn of Oz festival.

On March 14, 2025, Land of Oz announced the 2025 Autumn of Oz was cancelled due to the need for "a comprehensive assessment of the event and the park itself" due to significant growth of the festival and Hurricane Helene. At the time, the park said it plans to reopen in 2026.

Land of Oz opened for the summer June 6, 2026 with the "theatrical musical-comedy dining experience" called "Tea with Dorothy and Aunt Em" with the Kansas family, including the farm workers, and a tour of the land "over the rainbow". An Autumn of Oz event is planned. Guests also get to hide in the farmhouse as the tornado carries it away, and the experience feels like the house is being carried away.
