= Elk Park, North Carolina =

- Town
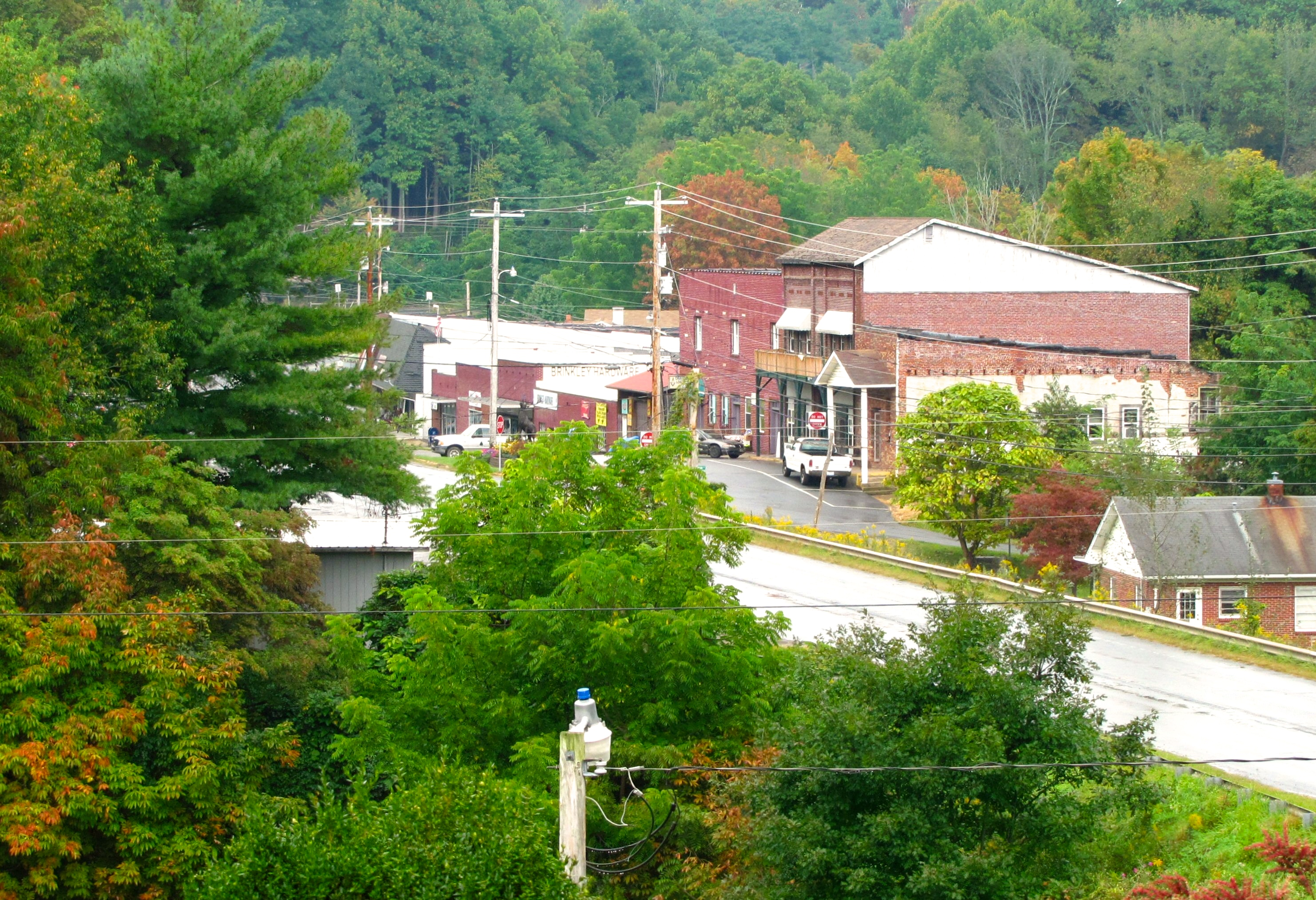

- Seal

- Location within the state of North Carolina
- Coordinates: 36°09′30″N 81°58′51″W
- Country: United States
- State: North Carolina
- County: Avery
- Incorporated: 1885

Government
  - Type: Mayor-council
  - Mayor: Daniel Boone

Area
  - Total: 0.69 sq mi (1.79 km^{2})
  - Land: 0.69 sq mi (1.79 km^{2})
  - Water: 0 sq mi (0.00 km^{2})
- Elevation: 3,166 ft (965 m)

Population (2020)
  - Total: 542
  - Density: 784.8/sq mi (303.03/km^{2})
- Time zone: UTC-5 (Eastern (EST))
  - Summer (DST): UTC-4 (EDT)
- ZIP code: 28622
- Area code: 828
- FIPS code: 37-20700
- GNIS feature ID: 2406435
- Website: www.townofelkpark.com

Elk Park is a town in Avery County, North Carolina, United States. The town was so named because of the number of elk killed there. The population was 542 at the 2020 census.

== Geography ==
According to the United States Census Bureau, the town has a total area of 0.7 square miles (1.8 km^{2}), all land.

== History ==
In 1882, the East Tennessee and Western North Carolina Railroad ("Tweetsie") linked Cranberry and Johnson City, Tennessee with a stop at Elk Park; three years later, Elk Park was incorporated. In 1911, Avery County was established; originally Elk Park was to serve as the county seat, but was changed after North Carolina Lieutenant Governor William C. Newland made a deal that the new county seat would be named after him for his aid in passage of the bill. However, Elk Park served as a temporary county seat while the new incorporated town of Newland was being constructed. In 1950, the East Tennessee and Western North Carolina decommissioned the railroad at Elk Park, ending rail service in Avery County, though it has survived as a town, unlike neighboring Cranberry.

Elk Park School was listed on the National Register of Historic Places in 2005.

== Demographics ==
Historical population
Census	Pop.	Note	%±
1890	313		—
1900	498		59.1%
1910	377		−24.3%
1920	452		19.9%
1930	488		8.0%
1940	467		−4.3%
1950	545		16.7%
1960	460		−15.6%
1970	503		9.3%
1980	535		6.4%
1990	486		−9.2%
2000	459		−5.6%
2010	452		−1.5%
2020	542		19.9%
U.S. Decennial Census

=== 2020 census ===
Elk Park racial composition
Race	Number	Percentage
White (non-Hispanic)	501	92.44%
Native American	4	0.74%
Other/Mixed	12	2.21%
Hispanic or Latino	25	4.61%

As of the 2020 United States census, there were 542 people, 328 households, and 231 families residing in the town.

=== 2000 census ===
As of the census of 2000, there were 459 people, 205 households, and 125 families residing in the town. The population density was 659.2 inhabitants per square mile (254.5/km^{2}). There were 237 housing units at an average density of 340.3 per square mile (131.4/km^{2}). The racial makeup of the town was 99.56% White, and 0.44% from two or more races. Hispanic or Latino of any race were 2.40% of the population.

There were 205 households, out of which 31.2% had children under the age of 18 living with them, 44.4% were married couples living together, 13.2% had a female householder with no husband present, and 39.0% were non-families. 35.1% of all households were made up of individuals, and 14.6% had someone living alone who was 65 years of age or older. The average household size was 2.24 and the average family size was 2.91.

In the town, the population was spread out, with 23.7% under the age of 18, 8.9% from 18 to 24, 28.5% from 25 to 44, 23.7% from 45 to 64, and 15.0% who were 65 years of age or older. The median age was 38 years. For every 100 females, there were 92.1 males. For every 100 females age 18 and over, there were 94.4 males.

The median income for a household in the town was $20,769, and the median income for a family was $27,500. Males had a median income of $26,000 versus $15,750 for females. The per capita income for the town was $13,486. About 15.6% of families and 20.0% of the population were below the poverty line, including 24.8% of those under age 18 and 19.2% of those age 65 or over.
