= Weaving Room of Crossnore School =

Historic school building in North Carolina, United States

- U.S. National Register of Historic Places
- Location within North Carolina Location within the United States
- Location: 205 Johnson Ln., Crossnore, North Carolina
- Coordinates: 36°1′25″N 81°55′50″W
- Area: 1.5 acres (0.61 ha)
- Built: 1936
- Architectural style: Rustic revival
- NRHP reference No.: 01000417
- Added to NRHP: April 25, 2001

Weaving Room of Crossnore School, also known as Home Spun House, is a historic school building located at Crossnore, Avery County, North Carolina. It was built in 1936, and is a 2 1/2-story, banked, vaguely Rustic Revival-style building constructed of randomly mortared river rock. It was built to house the weaving program of the Crossnore School, an orphanage with an industrial and vocational training program.

It was listed on the National Register of Historic Places in 2001.

The building is now home to the Crossnore Weavers and Crossnore Fine Arts Gallery, a fine art gallery, weaving studio with museum exhibits, and retail shop that benefits that Crossnore School, a private children's home.
