= KTMC =

KTMC may refer to:

- Kwun Tong Maryknoll College, in Hong Kong
- KTMC (AM), a radio station (1400 AM) licensed to McAlester, Oklahoma, United States
- KTMC-FM, a radio station (105.1 FM) licensed to McAlester, Oklahoma
- KTMC - Kukreja Transformer Mfg. Co., a power product company, registered with Indian Government, Delhi, INDIA
- KTMC - Kovai Thumpers Motorcycle Club, Coimbatore, The Oldest motorcycle biking club in coimbatore for Royal Enfield riders. Bullet club in coimbatore.
