= Bob and the Showgram =

American morning radio show

- Also known as: The Showgram
- Created by: Bob Dumas
- Starring: Erica DeLong, Ben & Ashleyh
- Country of origin: United States

Production
- Running time: 4 hours

Original release
- Network: WDCG
- Release: 1992 – August 30, 2019

The Showgram was a morning radio show based at WDCG-FM in Raleigh-Durham, North Carolina. The cast consisted of radio personalities Erica DeLong and Executive Producer Ben and Ashleyh.

== Broadcast information ==
Bob and the Showgram aired weekdays on G105 in Raleigh-Durham, North Carolina. A "best of" from the previous week used to air on Saturdays. From August 2009 until June 2010, Bob and the Showgram was syndicated to WDCG's sister station in Greensboro, North Carolina, 105.7 NOW, but was cancelled due to low ratings. The show is a production of the Clear Channel Communications Corporation. The broadcast studio is located in Smoketree Tower in Raleigh.

Dumas, former producer Mike Morse, and former co-producer Jon Clark were co-hosts of a Thursday night country-music themed show on WDCG's sister station 106.1 RDUCountry from August 2008-October 2009. Dumas ended this show because of conflicts with his morning show. Soon after Dumas resigned from this show, Clear Channel, owners of WRDU, announced their intentions to change the format of the station from country to a news/talk format to compete with Curtis Media Group powerhouse WPTF. This change took effect January 1, 2010.

In the spring of 2014 the last hour of Bob and the Showgram was stripped and replaced by, "The Class Reunion" dedicated to classic hits from the 80's, 90's, and early 00's. After months of listener dissatisfaction with "The Class Reunion," the last hour was replaced with music all together.

Bob Dumas was "let go" by iHeartRadio on August 30, 2019.

== Previous hosts and interns ==
Mike Stiles was the original co-host with Bob Dumas. At the time, the show was called "The Bob and Mike Show." In the mid nineties Mike was replaced with Madison Lane. The show was renamed "The Showgram with Bob and Madison." Madison then left G105 in 2004 for another Raleigh/Clear Channel station, WRSN-FM Sunny 93.9. She reportedly left over creative differences with Bob Dumas. Mike Morse, Amy Bristol, Kristin Klingshirn (aka "Kentucky Kristin"), and Erica DeLong have been all been cohosts since that time. It has been said Bristol was released also due to creative differences with Dumas.

The show also features a number of broadcast interns who have come and gone over the course of the production. In 1999 Mark Kaye was the producer alongside John "Big Flash" Hartnett. Mark Kaye is now morning-drive host at WAPE in Jacksonville, Florida. During the following year the Showgram was known for numerous stunts and on air gimmicks which led them to being the #1 consecutive morning show in the Raleigh market at the time. Kaye left to host a morning show in Washington, D.C., and "Big Flash" was let go due to creative changes. Tommy Owen (the original Flash) replaced Kaye after taking a hiatus from the show. After 2 years on the show he left the Showgram to follow a new career path. As of 2017, Tommy is executive producer of The Bert Show in Atlanta, GA. In 2001, Erica DeLong known on-air as "Erica the Intern" joined the crew, shortly after she was hired as an on-air producer. She was later laid off by the station because of the Early 2000s recession. In early 2006 there was an on-air competition to find a new intern after "Intern Ben" returned to his native Canada. One of the more high-profile interns was referred to as "Racist Rodney" for his typical "that's racist!" reaction to statements made on the show, particularly those made by Dumas. During the middle of 2006, another intern, "Fried Rice," joined the show. He was known for believing that he was a member of the African-American race. Racist Rodney, along with several other African-American members of the show's audience, accepted Fried Rice's self-description as an African-American. Racist Rodney and Fried Rice were best known for sticking together and speaking out for the African-American community, because they were occasionally subjected to racist comments from host Bob Dumas. In January 2007, interns Racist Rodney and Fried Rice left the show in hopes of beginning a career in the hip-hop industry. The summer of 2011 saw the development of popular interns "Peanut Butter" and "Jelly". Peanut Butter also applied for the new co-host position that same summer.

On July 21, 2011, it was announced on-air that Kentucky Kristin would be departing the show to take a broadcast position in Atlanta with The Bert Show that provided her with an increase in salary. Kristin continues to be quite successful with The Bert Show (2017), she is the 2nd Showgram Alum that currently is working in Atlanta on that show. The other hosts simultaneously announced the beginning of a search for a new female member of the broadcast team. After a month long (and according to some listeners, fake) audition process, Dumas decided to bring back Erica DeLong as the new female co-host.

On September 19, 2011, it was announced that Jon Clark was no longer part of the Showgram for undisclosed reasons. Bob Dumas stated that it was "part of the business" and not a Showgram thing. Bob has said he will not comment about the incident any further. Fans created a Facebook page to "Bring Back Weird Creepy Jon", but to no avail. Brooke "Peanut Butter" Hoover has since taken over the role that Jon Clark held on the show as producer. Clark went back to his hometown in Virginia. He now is an associate producer for a station in Roanoke, Virginia. It has been said Clark damaged some station property and lied about committing the act. This information has neither been confirmed or denied. Clark no longer works in radio.

On July 23, 2012, the Showgram was to return "Live" coming back from vacation, instead "Best of" continued to play. It was confirmed and announced that Executive Producer Mike Morse was no longer part of the Showgram. Morse confirmed he was no longer part of the show on his Facebook page. In May 2013, Mike joined as co-host of WNCN's 'My Carolina Today'. He has since moved to Dallas to be executive producer for a morning show there. Morse still runs his DJ business in North Carolina.

On August 13, 2012, Michael "Breeze" Rackoff became the new executive producer of the Showgram. Breeze joined the Showgram after being the producer of The Ace & TJ Show for the past five and a half years. After just over 3 months on the show and being made to feel generally unwelcome by listeners, as well as co-hosts Bob Dumas, Erica DeLong and Brooke Hoover, Breeze asked to be reassigned to another job within the company or let go. On Monday, November 19, 2012, he was terminated. The show has yet to address or acknowledge his departure. Several fans that have spoken to Breeze have learned that the Christmas parade was indeed the idea of Bob and that Breeze asked to be excused from the meeting where the idea was finalized. According to other sources, this was untrue and never Dumas's idea. Breeze was recently announced as the executive producer on the Drex and Maney morning show on 95.1 Kiss FM in Charlotte. According to Breeze he holds no ill will towards The Showgram and repeatedly states that he still loves Dumas and respects his contributions to the radio industry and to him personally. Months after, Elic Thomas rejoined the show as executive producer in March, 2013

On November 3, 2015, executive producer Elic Thomas announced he had exited the show and would be focusing more on producing television shows rather than radio.

In late February 2016, the Showgram cast was again revamped when it was announced on air that producer Brooke "Peanut Butter" Hoover had taken a job in a larger "IHeart" city and was leaving the Showgram. Listeners were not surprised, as Brody had been "sitting in" on the Showgram during previous weeks. She announced via her social media outlets that she had moved to Phoenix, Arizona, and will be on KNIX Country. Brody and Catholic Joe have since filled in. Brody has taken over as full-time executive producer, and associate producer Nicole has now taken over for Brooke Hoover. Nicole left the Showgram for another job in May 2017.

== Controversies ==
"Bob and the Showgram" has a history of controversial broadcasts and subsequent disciplinary actions. Bob Dumas is a self-proclaimed "narcissistic redneck" and often makes statements which take on an inflammatory note against non-Christians and Harry Potter fans. Dumas even refused to play "Guitar Hero" based on the fact "satan" showed up at the end of the game. Dumas has also alienated some celebrity guests and causing on-air controversy and awkwardness including Molly Ringwold and Paris Hilton. Hilton's awkward interview was recorded off air and played later, however Hilton's conversation with her agent was caught on tape supposedly after she hung up. Hilton was livid and was cursing about how rude and unprofessional Dumas and crew were to her. The after-interview recording was played on tabloid TV shows TMZ and Inside Edition. Dumas called her "sexy girl" on air but he later retracted the statement as "buttering her up".

=== Encouraging drivers to terrorize bicyclists ===
On September 22 and 23 of 2003, Dumas encouraged listeners to call in and relate stories about how they terrorized bicyclists. In the course of that show, he said that he kept empty bottles in his vehicle so that he could throw them at cyclists. These statements caused protests from the local community, who successfully lobbied for an official resolution that the capital of the state was friendly to bicyclists and convinced some local businesses to pull their advertising. Bob was suspended for two days and station management aired an apology. Eventually a compromise was reached between the community and station management.

=== American Idol ===
Bob Dumas and previous host Amy Bristle were suspended from the station after causing national controversy by making offensive statements, characterized by some as racist, about the 2004 winner of American Idol, Fantasia, of High Point, such as calling her "ghetto."

=== American Indians ===
Dumas also asked if the groom's grandfather would stand on the side of the road with "a single tear," a reference to the well known 1971 "Crying Indian" TV and print ads which were part of a Keep America Beautiful ad campaign. Also, co-host Mike Morse asked, "After you guys get married, are you going to have a teepee-warming party?"

On April 9, 2008, the cast was suspended and the show was temporarily replaced by music. The show returned on April 14, 2008.

=== Mexican Americans ===
On April 2, 2008, just one day removed from the Native American flap, Bob Dumas criticized the Mexican Consulate in Raleigh over the issue of illegal immigration. An assistant producer, Jon Clark, went to the consulate. The initial plan was for him to be posing as an INS agent seeking documentation of citizenship for those who were there that day; however, they then decided to play "What are YOU doing at the Mexican Consulate?"

=== Capitol Broadcasting ===
On July 27, 2011, Bob was taken off the air after threatening to publicly humiliate Capital Broadcasting CEO Jim Goodmon and instructed him to stop blocking interviews from his station and particularly his 14-year-old daughter, who was scheduled to interview American Idol winner Scotty McCreery that same day. Dumas returned to the air not discussing the incident and his daughter went ahead with the interview.

=== Raleigh Christmas Parade ===
On November 17, 2012, G105 had a float in the Raleigh WRAL Christmas Parade, featuring an African-American man who was strapped to a harness on the back of a tow truck. He was portrayed as an angel who was going to turn "crackers" into Beyoncé. This action led to Michael "Breeze" Rackoff being dismissed as director of the Showgram, a position he held for only three months. Previously, he held the same position for the Ace & TJ Show out of Charlotte.

=== Equipment Breaking Incident ===
Sometime in 2015 Bob could be heard in the background along with Elic Thomas taping windows and turning on power tools. Erica and Peanut Butter were in the background trying to go through the Hollywood news. Bob then proceeded to saw what could be heard as a desk or microphone stand or something of that nature. Erica and Peanut Butter were in shock and tried to go on. Bob told Erica and Peanut Butter mid-conversation to get off the air and leave with them. He was tired of things not working and walked out while on the air. You can hear doors slamming and voices, then dead silence. There has not been any confirmation if this was fake or real. The Showgram returned a few days later, most likely with "equipment" being fixed.

== Contributions to the community ==
=== Pennies From Heaven ===
In November 2007, the Showgram raised over USD $280,000 for the Make-A-Wish Foundation of Eastern North Carolina. Celebrity spokespersons Ashlee Simpson and Lifehouse guitarist Jason Wade, along with the families of children with life-threatening diseases and the entire Eastern North Carolina community were also involved in this. The show also raised $280,000 for this charity in 2007. Overall, Pennies From Heaven has raised well over $2,000,000 for the Make-A-Wish Foundation.

=== Bob's Buddies ===
- November 2008, Bob and the show hosted the first "Bob's Buddies" charity event to benefit "The Pediatric Brain Tumor Foundation". The Event was LIVE at Crabtree Valley Mall the day after Thanksgiving raising nearly $100,000. This year Dumas change the Showgram's charity from "Make-a-Wish" to The Pediatric Brain Tumor Foundation this year due to his tumor surgery in 2007.

In 2009, Bob and the Showgram raised over $115,000 for the pediatric brain tumor foundation through donations collected through a 12-hour-long marathon and an auction. In 2010, Bob and the Showgram raised nearly $200,000 for the PBTF. Bob's Buddies has raised more money each year with charitable events other than the radiothon, which continues to be highly successful for the PBTF.

=== Assistance to local law enforcement ===
- A show segment Bob The Bounty Hunter has been successful at spreading the word about wanted criminals in five North Carolina counties. The local community has stepped up to call in tips about fugitives after hearing their descriptions on the show, however, Dumas ended this segment in August 2009 after the Showgram had been syndicated to the Greensboro, NC market. As of June 2010, no station in the Greensboro market carries the Showgram, so it is currently unknown at this time if Dumas will re-introduce this segment.
- In 2004 the show participated in G105's "Operation Teddy Bear", a program designed to collect teddy bears from the community and provide those to children when law enforcement officials responded to a call where kids would be involved.

=== Disaster relief ===
- In 2005 the show hosted a Hurricane Katrina Relief effort entitled Bob & The Showgram’s Bus to the Bayou which collected 11 tractor trailers full of supplies from the community and Dumas himself helped deliver them to communities affected by the hurricane in Mississippi and Louisiana.
- On April 18, 2011, Bob and the Showgram hosted a relief effort for the series of tornadoes that swept across North Carolina two days prior. They were the first group to donate to the cause, donating seven pallets of water, food, and other goods to the local Food Bank. In addition, they raised money for Red Cross Disaster Relief and, partnered with Harris Teeter, handed out bags of ice to families without power.

=== Other charity involvement ===
- In April 2008 the cast of the show was active in the "Angels Among Us" charity event, participating as "Team Larry".
