= KSAL =

KSAL may refer to:

- KSAL (AM), a radio station (1150 AM) licensed to Salina, Kansas, United States
- KSAL-FM, a radio station (104.9 FM) licensed to Salina, Kansas, United States
- Chief of Staff of the Indonesian Navy (Indonesian: Kepala Staf TNI Angkatan Laut, abbreviated KSAL)
