= WRDU (disambiguation) =

WRDU may refer to:

- WRDU, a radio station licensed to Wake Forest, North Carolina
- WTKK, a radio station licensed to Knightdale, North Carolina, which used the call letters WRDU from 1984 to 2013
- WRDC, a TV station (channel 28) licensed to Raleigh, North Carolina, United States, which once used the call letter WRDU
