= WBAG =

WBAG may refer to:

- WBAG (AM), a radio station (1150 AM) licensed to Burlington, North Carolina, United States
- WNCB, a radio station (93.9 FM) licensed to Cary, North Carolina, United States and formerly called WBAG-FM
- Wiener Börse, the Vienna Stock Exchange
