= 1150 AM =

AM radio frequency

The following radio stations broadcast on AM frequency 1150 kHz: 1150 AM is a Regional broadcast frequency, according to the U.S. Federal Communications Commission and the Canadian Radio-television and Telecommunications Commission.

== In Argentina ==
- LRA2 in Viedma, Chubut
- LRA51 Nacional in San José de Jáchal
- LRH202 Tupá Mbaé in Posadas, Misiones
- LT9 Brigadier Lopez in Santa Fe
- Sagrada Familia in San Justo

== In Canada ==
Call sign	City of license	Daytime power (kW)	Nighttime power (kW)	Transmitter coordinates
CBXA	Mica Dam, British Columbia	0.04	0.04	52.061111°N 118.574722°W
CJSL	Estevan, Saskatchewan	10	10	49.0569°N 102.988°W
CKFR	Kelowna, British Columbia	10	10	49.8478°N 119.466°W
CKOC	Hamilton, Ontario	50	50	43.051111°N 79.811389°W

== In Mexico ==
- XEAD-AM in Tonala, Jalisco
- XECSAK-AM in Matehuala, San Luis Potosi
- XEJP-AM in San Miguel Teotongo, CDMX
- XERM-AM in Mexicali, Baja California
- XEUAS-AM in Culiacan, Sinaloa

== In the United States ==
Call sign	City of license	Facility ID	Class	Daytime power (kW)	Nighttime power (kW)	Transmitter coordinates
KAGO	Klamath Falls, Oregon	23245	D	5	0.052	42.215556°N 121.7975°W (daytime); 42.215556°N 121.798056°W (nighttime)
KASM	Albany, Minnesota	33464	D	2.1	0.021	45.631389°N 94.6°W
KBPO	Port Neches, Texas	68762	D	0.5	0.063	30.084444°N 93.970278°W
KCCT	Corpus Christi, Texas	54646	B	1	0.5	27.800278°N 97.478889°W
KCPS	Burlington, Iowa	5224	D	0.5	0.067	40.853056°N 91.136111°W
KEIB	Los Angeles, California	19219	B	50	44	34.033333°N 117.983333°W
KHRO	El Paso, Texas	51705	B	5	0.38	31.753611°N 106.416111°W
KIMM	Rapid City, South Dakota	66820	D	5	0.036	44.076111°N 103.111667°W
KKNW	Seattle, Washington	57834	B	10	6	47.586667°N 122.186111°W
KNED	McAlester, Oklahoma	37778	B	1	0.5	34.936667°N 95.733056°W
KNMM	Albuquerque, New Mexico	227	D	1.5	0.105	35.132222°N 106.621667°W
KNRV	Englewood, Colorado	56643	B	10	1	39.605°N 104.840278°W
KOLJ	Quanah, Texas	24250	D	0.53	0.077	34.315278°N 99.746944°W
KQQQ	Pullman, Washington	54724	D	11	0.027	46.726667°N 117.206389°W
KRMS	Osage Beach, Missouri	35554	D	0.84	0.055	38.088056°N 92.738056°W
KSAL	Salina, Kansas	28471	B	5	5	38.884167°N 97.517222°W
KSEN	Shelby, Montana	67655	B	10	5	48.481111°N 111.883889°W
KWKY	Des Moines, Iowa	49099	B	2.5	1	41.4525°N 93.681111°W
KZNE	College Station, Texas	7632	B	1	0.5	30.631667°N 96.357778°W (daytime); 30.631667°N 96.3575°W (nighttime)
WAVO	Rock Hill, South Carolina	72330	D	5	0.059	34.948611°N 80.999444°W
WBAG	Burlington-Graham, North Carolina	63782	D	1	0.048	36.113333°N 79.45°W
WCRK	Morristown, Tennessee	71294	B	5	0.5	36.236389°N 83.309167°W
WCUE	Cuyahoga Falls, Ohio	20674	B	5	0.5	41.201389°N 81.523611°W
WDEL	Wilmington, Delaware	16458	B	5	5	39.815833°N 75.53°W
WDTM	Selmer, Tennessee	54810	D	1		35.190833°N 88.589167°W
WEAQ	Chippewa Falls, Wisconsin	9865	D	5	0.046	44.884722°N 91.390278°W
WELC	Welch, West Virginia	52865	D	5		37.416944°N 81.616111°W
WGBR	Goldsboro, North Carolina	48370	B	5	0.8	35.373889°N 78.011667°W
WGGH	Marion, Illinois	70253	D	5	0.044	37.729722°N 88.895556°W
WGOW	Chattanooga, Tennessee	54526	B	5	1	35.068056°N 85.334444°W
WHBY	Kimberly, Wisconsin	73660	B	20	25	44.138889°N 88.546111°W
WHUN	Huntingdon, Pennsylvania	28131	D	1	0.036	40.455°N 77.980556°W
WIMA	Lima, Ohio	37498	B	1	1	40.679722°N 84.109444°W
WJBO	Baton Rouge, Louisiana	4054	B	15	5	30.463056°N 91.269444°W
WJEM	Valdosta, Georgia	73133	D	2.3	0.05	30.846944°N 83.237222°W
WJRD	Tuscaloosa, Alabama	24384	B	20	1	33.249444°N 87.608611°W
WLOC	Munfordville, Kentucky	58352	D	1	0.061	37.269167°N 85.915556°W
WMNY	New Kensington, Pennsylvania	52241	D	1	0.07	40.573333°N 79.782778°W
WMRD	Middletown, Connecticut	54678	D	2.5	0.046	41.557222°N 72.620278°W
WMST	Mt. Sterling, Kentucky	46745	D	2.5	0.053	38.044722°N 83.901389°W
WNDB	Daytona Beach, Florida	10342	B	1	1	29.235°N 81.071944°W
WNLR	Churchville, Virginia	48541	D	2.5	0.035	38.210833°N 79.131389°W
WSNW	Seneca, South Carolina	5969	D	1	0.058	34.6875°N 82.987778°W
WTMP	Egypt Lake, Florida	74108	B	10	0.5	28.011667°N 82.498056°W
WWDJ	Boston, Massachusetts	25051	B	5	5	42.413333°N 71.211111°W
WXKO	Fort Valley, Georgia	41988	D	1	0.062	32.576111°N 83.904722°W
