= Rush Radio =

Rush Radio may refer to:

- WPTI, a radio station licensed to Eden, North Carolina, United States and known as "Rush Radio 94.5"
- WTKK, a radio station licensed to Knightdale, North Carolina, United States and known as "Rush Radio 106.1"
- WXKS (AM), a radio station licensed to Newton, Massachusetts, United States formerly as "Rush Radio 1200"
- WRNO-FM, a radio station licensed to New Orleans, Louisiana, United States and known as "Rush Radio 99.5"
