= G105 =

G105 may refer to any of the following:

- China National Highway 105, a major trunk route in China
- the on-air moniker of WDCG, a radio station licensed to Durham, North Carolina, USA
- R-1820-G105, a model of the Wright R-1820 aircraft engine
