= KYEZ =

- Salina, Kansas; United States
- Broadcast area: Salina-Manhattan, Kansas
- Frequency: 93.7 MHz
- Branding: Y93.7

Programming
- Format: Country

Ownership
- Owner: Christopher Miller; (Meridian Media, LLC)
- Sister stations: KSAL, KSAL-FM

Technical information
- Licensing authority: FCC
- Facility ID: 28470
- Class: C1
- ERP: 100,000 watts
- HAAT: 155 meters (509 ft)
- Transmitter coordinates: 38°57′14″N 97°36′29″W

Links
- Public license information: Public file; LMS
- Webcast: Listen Live

KYEZ (93.7 FM, "Y93.7") is a radio station licensed to serve Salina, Kansas, United States. The station is owned by Christopher Miller, through licensee Meridian Media, LLC. The station was assigned the KYEZ call sign by the Federal Communications Commission.

KYEZ broadcasts a country music format. Prior to being branded Y93.7, KYEZ was branded as KY Country 94 and KY94.

KYEZ started as an easy listening station before flipping to country on June 1, 1981.
