= KMCO =

Radio station in McAlester–Wilburton, Oklahoma

KMCO-FM
- McAlester, Oklahoma; United States
- Broadcast area: Wilburton, Oklahoma
- Frequency: 101.3 MHz
- Branding: K101.3

Programming
- Format: Country music

Ownership
- Owner: McAlester Streaming Technologies, LLC dba McAlester Radio
- Sister stations: KNED, KTMC-FM, KTMC

History
- First air date: April 13, 1966

Technical information
- Licensing authority: FCC
- Facility ID: 37777
- Class: C1
- ERP: 100,000 watts
- HAAT: 188 meters (617 ft)
- Transmitter coordinates: 34.98694°N 95.70278°W

Links
- Public license information: Public file; LMS
- Webcast: Listen live
- Website: mcalesterradio.com

KMCO (101.3 FM) is a radio station licensed to McAlester and Wilburton, Oklahoma. The station broadcasts a country music format and is owned by McAlester Streaming Technologies, LLC dba McAlester Radio.
