= KHTR =

Radio station in Pullman, Washington

Coordinates: 46.811°N 116.916°W

- Pullman, Washington; United States
- Broadcast area: Pullman, Washington; Moscow, Idaho
- Frequency: 104.3 MHz (HD Radio)
- Branding: New Country 104.3

Programming
- Format: Country
- Subchannels: HD2: Classic hits "Hits 104.7"; HD3: Active rock "Big New Rock 103.9"
- Affiliations: Premiere Networks; Westwood One

Ownership
- Owner: Radio Palouse
- Sister stations: KQQQ

History
- First air date: 1967 (as KPUL-FM)
- Former call signs: KPUL-FM (1967–1975); KQQQ (1975–1983); KQQQ-FM (1983–1988)

Technical information
- Licensing authority: FCC
- Facility ID: 54722
- Class: C1
- ERP: 24,000 watts
- HAAT: 509 meters (1,670 ft)
- Translators: HD3: 103.9 K280FQ (Lewiston, Idaho); HD2: 104.7 K284BW (Moscow, Idaho)

Links
- Public license information: Public file; LMS
- Webcast: Listen Live; Listen Live (HD2); Listen Live (HD3)
- Website: pullmanradio.com

KHTR (104.3 FM) is a commercial HD radio station in Pullman, Washington, broadcasting to the Pullman, Washington-Moscow, Idaho area. The main analog and HD1 signals air a country music format branded as "New Country 104-3".

== HD Radio ==
KHTR was the first commercial station in the Pullman, Washington-Moscow, Idaho area with a licensed and operational HD Radio transmitter. simulcasting sister station KQQQ on their HD2 channel. They broadcast a format similar to the KQQQ news/talk format on their HD3 channel, which is modified for the Lewiston, ID and Clarkston, WA listening areas, and also carried on an FM translator covering the same listening areas.

In September 2019, KHTR HD2 started airing a classic hits format branded as "Hits 104.7", which airs on translator K284BW in Moscow, Idaho. It had previously been used to give sister station KQQQ an FM outlet. KQQQ programming is now aired on FM in the Pullman–Moscow area on its own translator at 102.1 FM.

KHTR is also a flagship station for Washington State Cougars football and men's basketball.
