= XERM-AM =

Radio station in Mexicali, Baja California, Mexico

- Mexicali, Baja California; Mexico
- Frequency: 1150 kHz
- Branding: Radio Mexicali

Programming
- Format: News/talk

Ownership
- Owner: (Media Sports de México, S.A. de C.V.)
- Operator: Primer Sistema de Noticias

History
- First air date: October 29, 1953
- Call sign meaning: Nicolás Rodríguez Mérida, owner in 1969

Technical information
- Licensing authority: CRT
- Class: C
- Power: 1 kW day/60 watts night

Links
- Website: psn.si

XERM-AM is a radio station on 1150 AM in Mexicali, Baja California. The station is owned by Primer Sistema de Noticias and broadcasts a news/talk format known as Radio Mexicali.

== History ==
XEGE-AM received its first concession on October 29, 1953. It was owned by Radio Comercial de Baja California, S.A. de C.V., which was owned by Jesús Eguía Molleda, and broadcast as a daytimer on 1150 kHz. By 1969, the call sign had changed to the current XERM-AM to match the sale of Radio Comercial de Baja California to Nicolás Rodríguez Mérida.

In 1999, XERM was sold to Radio Fórmula. Intermittently in the 2010s and 2020s, it has been leased by Primer Sistema de Noticias (PSN) to provide an outlet for its talk programming in Mexicali.
