= KQQQ =

Radio station in Pullman, Washington

- Pullman, Washington; United States
- Broadcast area: Pullman-Moscow; Lewiston, Idaho
- Frequency: 1150 kHz
- Branding: Newstalk 102.1 FM 1150 AM

Programming
- Format: News Talk Information
- Affiliations: ABC Radio, Premiere Radio Networks, Fox News Radio, Seattle Mariners Radio Network

Ownership
- Owner: Radio Palouse, Inc.
- Sister stations: KHTR, KQZB

History
- First air date: 1950 (as KBKH); January 23, 1983 (as KQQQ)
- Former call signs: KPMN (1950, CP); KBKH (1950–1953); KOFE (1953–1967); KPUL (1967–1977); KNOI (1977–1983)

Technical information
- Licensing authority: FCC
- Facility ID: 54724
- Class: D
- Power: 11,000 watts day 27 watts night
- Transmitter coordinates: 46°43′36.00″N 117°12′23.00″W
- Translator: 102.1 K271CU (Pullman)

Links
- Public license information: Public file; LMS
- Webcast: Listen live
- Website: pullmanradio.com

KQQQ (1150 AM) is a radio station broadcasting a News Talk Information format. Licensed to Pullman, Washington, United States, the station serves the Pullman-Moscow area. The station is currently owned by Radio Palouse, Inc. and features programming from ABC Radio, Premiere Radio Networks and Fox News Radio.

KQQQ is heard on FM translator K271CU (102.1 FM) from a transmitter in Pullman. Until September 2019, the station was heard on another translator, K284BW at 104.7, by way of sister KHTR's HD2 subchannel; this now is a separately programmed station.

1150 AM is a Regional broadcast frequency.

== History ==
The station went on the air in 1950. By the 1970s, when it changed its call letters to KNOI (K#1), the station was airing a country format. The sister station was an automated rock format KQQQ-FM (KQ-105); KNOI was later changed to KQQQ on January 23, 1983.

For much of its history, the station was a daytimer, signing off at sunset to protect KSL in Salt Lake City at adjacent 1160 AM.
