= KSAL (AM) =

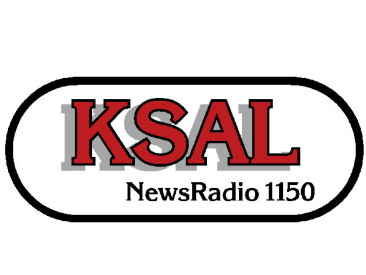
- Salina, Kansas; United States
- Broadcast area: Salina-Manhattan area
- Frequency: 1150 kHz
- Branding: NewsRadio 1150 KSAL

Programming
- Format: News-talk
- Affiliations: Premiere Networks; Westwood One; Fox News Radio

Ownership
- Owner: Christopher Miller; (Meridian Media, LLC)
- Sister stations: KSAL-FM, KYEZ

History
- First air date: June 1937; 89 years ago
- Call sign meaning: Salina

Technical information
- Licensing authority: FCC
- Facility ID: 28471
- Class: B
- Power: 5,000 watts
- Transmitter coordinates: 38°53′03″N 97°31′05″W
- Translator: 106.7 K294DI (Salina)

Links
- Public license information: Public file; LMS
- Webcast: Listen live
- Website: www.ksal.com

KSAL (1150 kHz "NewsRadio 1150") is a commercial AM radio station that broadcasts a news-talk radio format. Licensed to Salina, Kansas, it serves the Salina-Manhattan area. The station is owned by Christopher Miller, through licensee Meridian Media, LLC.

KSAL is powered at 5,000 watts. By day it uses a non-directional antenna. To protect other stations on 1150 AM from interference, at night it switches to a directional antenna with a four-tower array. The transmitter is on North Woodward Road in New Cambria. Programming is also heard on 250 watt FM translator K294DI at 106.7 MHz in Salina.

On weekdays, KSAL begins with The KSAL Morning News. Before sunrise, it also carries two news magazines, This Morning, America's First News with Gordon Deal and America in the Morning. There are also local talk and sports shows in the late afternoon and evening. The rest of the schedule is nationally syndicated conservative talk programs: Brian Kilmeade, The Clay Travis and Buck Sexton Show, The Ramsey Show with Dave Ramsey, Ground Zero with Clyde Lewis and Coast to Coast AM with George Noory. Weekends feature some repeats of weekday shows, as well as Kim Komando "Somewhere in Time with Art Bell" and sports programming from SportsMap. Most hours begin with world and national news from Fox News Radio.

== History ==
=== Early years ===
The station went on the air in June 1937. It was Salinas' first radio station, originally powered at only 250 watts by day and 100 watts at night, broadcasting at 1500 kHz. The studios were in the former Salina Journal building at the southwest corner of Seventh and Iron, which today is a parking lot. The station's call sign was originally KSJS - the "SJ" standing for the Salina Journal daily newspaper. Its first owner was R.J. Laubengayer, who not only was president of the Salina Journal and KSAL, but director of Consolidated Printing and the Farmers National Bank in Salina. Laubengayer served as the station's general manager.

KSAL became an affiliate of the NBC Blue Network, carrying its schedule of dramas, comedies, news and sports. The Blue Network later became the ABC Radio Network. When network programming moved to television, KSAL switched to a full service, middle of the road format, with popular adult music, news and sports. Through the 1970s, 1980s and 1990s, KSAL stayed with ABC as an ABC Information Network affiliate.

=== Personalities ===
One of KSAL's first personalities was Ken Jennison. He started his professional radio career (after four years at Kansas State University) in 1949. He began as a copywriter, putting together daily "logbooks" that tracked each day's broadcast from the moment the station went on the air at 6 a.m. to when it signed off with the "Star-Spangled Banner" at midnight.

"Everything was written down -- programs, commercials, introductions, music selection -- everything was in that book," Jennison said. "It would be given to the announcer, and he would follow it exactly. If you had a news break at 3 p.m., you had to time it out right."

In the early 1960s, tape was introduced. Announcements and commercials would be prerecorded on cassette tapes, Jennison said, and that took some of the pressure off disc jockeys.

Live music also was a staple in the early days of radio. A popular program of the 1960s was the Sonny Slater show, which featured musicians playing live at the studio at noon on Saturdays. Live music programs didn't last long on local radio. "It was difficult to fill up a program with live music all the time," Jennison said.

=== Adding an FM station ===
In May 1974, KSAL added an FM station at 93.7 MHz. Its call letters were KYEZ, with the EZ standing for easy listening music. That station also joined ABC as an ABC-FM News affiliate. Much of its original programming was automated quarter hour sweeps of beautiful music. Today it is a country music station.

In the 1980s, KSAL was the only radio station in the area that had its own color weather radar that could help predict when thunderstorms were entering a certain area.

=== Switch to news-talk ===
As music listening moved to the FM dial in the 1980s and 1990s, KSAL began airing more talk programming, in addition to music. In April 1994, music programming on KSAL ended and the station format was changed into news-talk.

KSAL also concentrates on local high school and regional sports. In addition to area high school football and other sports coverage, KSAL is the network affiliate for Kansas State University sports and Kansas City Royals baseball for the Salina area.

== Former hosts ==
- Jim Rose, Ken Jennison, Rick Mach, Greg Martin, George Pyle, Dan Robins, Bob Sheldon, Bob Davis, Brian Collins, Tom Mulligan, Jeff Comfort, Sonny Slater, Larry Mohlenbrink, J. Steven Smethers, Phil (Grossardt) Ross, Jim Robertson, Bruce Steinbrock, Don (Schwartz) Bradley, Steve Kohl and Clarke Sanders.

Despite rumors to the contrary, ABC news commentator Paul Harvey was never employed by KSAL. He was station manager for KFBI, which had remote studios on the second floor of the Fox-Watson Theatre in Salina in the mid-late 1930s.
