= KTMC (AM) =

Radio station in McAlester, Oklahoma

KTMC-AM
- McAlester, Oklahoma; United States
- Frequency: 1400 kHz
- Branding: Cool 96.7 FM! The coolest spot on the dial

Programming
- Format: Adult contemporary

Ownership
- Owner: McAlester Streaming Technologies, LLC dba McAlester Radio
- Sister stations: KNED, KMCO, KTMC-FM

History
- First air date: March 3, 1946
- Call sign meaning: Keeping The Music CooL

Technical information
- Licensing authority: FCC
- Facility ID: 67593
- Class: C
- Power: 1,000 watts (daytime); 1,000 watts (nighttime)
- Transmitter coordinates: 34.94944°N 95.76694°W
- Translator: 96.7 K244FI (McAlester)

Links
- Public license information: Public file; LMS
- Webcast: Listen Live
- Website: mcalesterradio.com

KTMC (1400 AM) is a radio station licensed to McAlester, Oklahoma, United States. The station broadcasts an adult contemporary format and is owned by McAlester Streaming Technologies, LLC dba McAlester Radio.

== History ==
In late November 1947, C.E. Wilson and P.D. Jackson sold KTMC to J. Stanley O'Neill for $100,000. At that time, the station was an ABC affiliate operating on 1400 kHz with 250 W power.

== Translators ==
Broadcast translator for KTMC
Call sign	Frequency	City of license	FID	ERP (W)	HAAT	Class	FCC info
K244FI	96.7 FM	McAlester, Oklahoma	139219	250	137 m (449 ft)	D	LMS
