= KSAL-FM =

- Salina, Kansas; United States
- Broadcast area: Salina–Manhattan
- Frequency: 104.9 MHz
- Branding: FM 104.9

Programming
- Format: Classic hits

Ownership
- Owner: Christopher Miller; (Meridian Media, LLC)
- Sister stations: KSAL, KYEZ

History
- First air date: May 1989 (as KCVS)
- Former call signs: KCVS (1989–1994); KZBZ (1994–2005)
- Call sign meaning: Salina

Technical information
- Licensing authority: FCC
- Facility ID: 65599
- Class: C3
- ERP: 14,000 watts
- HAAT: 134 meters (440 ft)
- Transmitter coordinates: 38°52′36.01164″N 97°43′16.13635″W

Links
- Public license information: Public file; LMS
- Webcast: Listen live
- Website: www.ksal.com

KSAL-FM (104.9 FM) is a radio station broadcasting a classic hits music format. Licensed to Salina, Kansas, United States, it serves the Salina–Manhattan area. The station is currently owned by Christopher Miller, through licensee Meridian Media, LLC.

== History ==
The station first went on the air on October 7, 1988, as KCVS, programming religious music. Then, in March 1994, John K. Vanier and Jerry Hinrikus, doing business as EBC, Inc., would buy KCVS and change the call letters to KZBZ. This was accompanied by a format switch to adult contemporary as its moniker became "Breezy 104.9." (KCVS would move to 91.7 MHz around this time.) Broadcast studios were established on South Ohio Street. In mid-1999, KZBZ changed format again to hot AC, brandishing the new name "The Buzz 104.9". By this time, studios had moved to the Townsite Building on North Santa Fe in downtown Salina. Morris Communications would later acquire the station in January 2004, and flipped the format to classic hits on May 2, 2005. Around this time, the call letters changed to KSAL-FM.

In 2015, Morris would sell its Salina Media Group to Alpha Media, who would spin the station off to Rocking M Media the following year. In October 2019, Rocking M co-owner Christopher Miller announced he would spin off KSAL-FM, KSAL and KYEZ into a new group called Meridian Media, while Meridian would operate KVOB and KZUH under a local marketing agreement. The sale was approved and consummated the following year.
