= KTMC-FM =

Radio station in McAlester, Oklahoma

- McAlester, Oklahoma; United States
- Frequency: 105.1 MHz
- Branding: Rock 105.1

Programming
- Format: Classic rock

Ownership
- Owner: McAlester Streaming Technologies, LLC dba McAlester Radio
- Sister stations: KNED, KMCO, KTMC

History
- First air date: June 24, 1987 (as KZBX on 104.9 MHz)
- Former call signs: KZBX (1987–1991)
- Former frequencies: 104.9 MHz (1987–1997)

Technical information
- Licensing authority: FCC
- Facility ID: 67592
- Class: A
- ERP: 6,000 watts
- HAAT: 154 meters (505 ft)
- Transmitter coordinates: 34°59′13″N 95°42′10″W

Links
- Public license information: Public file; LMS
- Webcast: Listen live
- Website: KTMC-FM Online

KTMC-FM (105.1 FM) is a radio station broadcasting a classic rock music format licensed to McAlester, Oklahoma, United States. The station is currently owned by McAlester Streaming Technologies, LLC dba McAlester Radio.

== History ==
The station first signed on with a Top 40/CHR format under the call letters KZBX on June 24, 1987. In 1990, the station changed its call letters to KTMC-FM and flipped its format to adult contemporary after KMCO dropped its previous adult contemporary format that same year. The station flipped its format to oldies in late-1993 and to its current classic rock format in 1997. The station originally signed on the air on 104.9 FM but was moved up a notch to 105.1 FM in 1997.
