= WBAG (AM) =

- Burlington-Graham, North Carolina; United States
- Frequency: 1150 kHz

Programming
- Format: Full Service - News - Talk - Sports - Beach Music - Oldies
- Affiliations: Motor Racing Network; Performance Racing Network

Ownership
- Owner: Gray Broadcasting LLC

History
- Call sign meaning: Burlington And Graham

Technical information
- Licensing authority: FCC
- Facility ID: 63782
- Class: D
- Power: 1,000 watts days 48 watts nights
- Transmitter coordinates: 36°06′48″N 79°27′00″W
- Translators: 105.9 W290CX, Burlington

Links
- Public license information: Public file; LMS
- Website: wbagamfm.com

WBAG (1150 AM) is a commercial radio station licensed to Burlington-Graham, North Carolina. It is owned by Gray Broadcasting and it airs a full service radio format of news, talk, sports, beach music and oldies. The studio, transmitter and tower are located on Burch Bridge Road in Burlington.

WBAG is powered at 1,000 watts during the day. The signal radius is approximately 40 miles (64 km), which covers all of Alamance County and extends into neighboring counties. But to protect other stations on 1150 AM from interference, it reduces power 48 watts at night. WBAG uses a Broadcast Electronics AM1 transmitter. Programming is also heard on FM translator W290CX at 105.9 MHz.

== History ==
On February 24, 1947, at 2 P.M. "1150 Radio" began broadcasting using the call sign WFNS. The station was started by Lawrence Neese Sr., Bowman Sanders, Bill Coble, Homer Andrews, Rufus Blanchard and Everette Quails. These six local businessmen formed the Burlington and Graham Broadcasting Company. The original studios and offices were located on Andrews Street at Main Street in downtown Burlington. The transmitter and tower were located on Burch Bridge Road where they remain.

The station has a dual city of license, both Burlington and Graham. WFNS was originally a daytimer, required to go off the air at sunset. A year later, 1947, Burlington and Graham Broadcasting added an FM station at 93.9 MHz.

Since the founding of the station in the late 1940s, it has carried a live broadcast of the Sunday morning worship service of the First Baptist Church in Burlington. The station also has covered North Carolina Tar Heels sports for over sixty years, as well as local high school sports and NASCAR.

In 1964, the call signs were changed to WBAG and WBAG-FM, signifying Burlington And Graham. At the same time, the format was changed to Top 40 hits. In 1970, WBAG moved to a new facility at 939 South Main Street in Burlington.

In 1983, The Village Companies purchased the Burlington and Graham Broadcasting Company and moved the FM station, now 93.9 WNCB, to the Raleigh radio market. WBAG AM 1150 remained in Burlington under the ownership of a newly formed corporation, Falcon Communications Inc.

In the mid-80s, the format switched to adult standards, using the Stardust format from the Timeless Radio Network. WBAG also used the national "Music of Your Life" and "America's Best Music" services, as well as playing locally originating beach music and oldies.

The station changed ownership two more times before being acquired in 2000 by Gray Broadcasting LLC, headed by Joe Gray. New studios and offices were constructed at 1745 Burch Bridge Road where the transmitter and tower were already located.

In 2016, WBAG began rebroadcasting on FM translator W290CX at 105.9 MHz.
