= KNED =

Radio station in McAlester, Oklahoma

- McAlester, Oklahoma; United States
- Frequency: 1150 kHz

Programming
- Format: Classic country
- Affiliations: ABC News Radio

Ownership
- Owner: McAlester Streaming Technologies, LLC dba McAlester Radio
- Sister stations: KTMC, KMCO, KTMC-FM

History
- First air date: March 14, 1950
- Call sign meaning: Keeping Neighbors Entertained Daily

Technical information
- Licensing authority: FCC
- Facility ID: 37778
- Class: B
- Power: 1,000 watts day 500 watts night
- Transmitter coordinates: 34°56′12.3″N 95°43′59.9″W

Links
- Public license information: Public file; LMS
- Webcast: Listen Live
- Website: KNED Online

KNED (1150 AM) is a radio station licensed to McAlester, Oklahoma, United States. The station broadcasts a Classic country format and is owned by McAlester Streaming Technologies, LLC dba McAlester Radio.

== Translators ==
| Call sign | Frequency | City of license | FID | ERP (W) | HAAT | Class | FCC info |
|---|---|---|---|---|---|---|---|
| K252FQ | (98.3 MHz) FM | McAlester, Oklahoma | 157266 | 250 | 137 m (449 ft) | D | LMS |
