= WNCB =

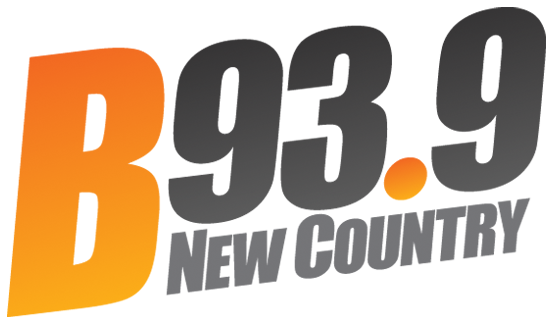
- Cary, North Carolina; United States
- Broadcast area: Raleigh–Durham; Research Triangle
- Frequency: 93.9 MHz (HD Radio)
- Branding: B93.9

Programming
- Format: Country
- Subchannels: HD2: K-Love
- Affiliations: Premiere Networks

Ownership
- Owner: iHeartMedia, Inc.; (iHM Licenses, LLC)
- Sister stations: WDCG, WRDU, WTKK, W237BZ

History
- First air date: February 24, 1947 (as WFNS-FM)
- Former call signs: WFNS-FM (1947–1960); WBAG-FM (1960–1983); WBAG (1983–1984); WZZU (1984–1996); WRSN (1996–2006); WKSL (2007–2014)
- Call sign meaning: "New Country B93.9"

Technical information
- Licensing authority: FCC
- Facility ID: 53596
- Class: C
- ERP: 100,000 watts
- HAAT: 453 meters (1,486 ft)
- Transmitter coordinates: 35°42′50.6″N 78°49′3″W
- Translators: HD2: 94.3 W232CH (Raleigh); HD2: 101.9 W270AW (Sanford)

Links
- Public license information: Public file; LMS
- Webcast: Listen live (via iHeartRadio)
- Website: b939country.iheart.com

WNCB (93.9 FM), known as "B93.9", is a country music radio station that serves the Raleigh-Durham market of North Carolina. It is owned and operated by iHeartMedia, Inc., whose sister stations include WDCG, WTKK, WRDU, and W237BZ.

The station was formerly licensed to Burlington, North Carolina, which is part of the Piedmont Triad market. However, the station changed its city of license to Cary after moving its transmitter from Terrell's Mountain in Orange County to the former WLFL-TV analog tower in Apex, along with G105 in the spring of 2008. WNCB's studios are located at Clear Channel's Triangle facility in Raleigh.

WNCB broadcasts in the HD Radio format.

== History ==
=== Early years ===
WFNS 1150 and WFNS-FM 93.9 simultaneously signed on from Burlington on February 24, 1947. The stations were owned by the Burlington-Graham Broadcasting Company. In 1964, the stations became WBAG and WBAG-FM. It was also the place that John Isley of John-Boy and Billy fame got his start in the radio business in the mid-1970s.

On August 29, 1984, WBAG-FM successfully completed its move into the Triangle market and changed its call letters to WZZU, It went by the handle "94Z" and carried a Top 40 format to compete with future sister station WDCG (G105). At the time, WZZU was owned by Chapel Hill-based The Village Companies (now VilCom), who also owned WCHL. 94Z was credited with pioneering the "Morning zoo" concept in the Triangle area, which featured mostly on-air banter amongst the personalities and numerous comedic bits. On March 1, 1989, at 5 p.m., the station changed formats from Top 40 to rock and branded itself "U93.9", and "Raleigh's new rock choice", competing with WRDU with more newer music. WZZU also picked up the UNC Tar Heels from WQDR-FM.

WZZU would later switch to classic rock and a new handle, this time it would be "Classic Rock 93.9". In May 1993, the station picked up the syndicated John Boy and Billy show to fill its morning spot. Later that year, Tucson, Arizona-based Prism Radio Partners purchased WZZU. WZZU was initially paired with WDCG. The Tar Heels moved to WTRG in 1994 as WZZU chose to focus more on music. Prism Radio was purchased by SFX in 1996, placing WTRG (later WRVA-FM) and WRDU in the same stable.

SFX wanted WZZU and WRDU not to compete with each other; the station would change call letters and formats on August 30, 1996. This time, the call letters were changed to WRSN, the format to soft rock, and its on-air name to "Sunny 93.9" all in an attempt to go after the well-established WRAL. It was also during that time that the JB&B show was bumped from 93.9, and picked up a month later by WRDU. Through a number of ownership changes over time, WRSN ended up being owned by Clear Channel since 2000. It was during that time that Sunny 93.9 began broadcasting an all-Christmas music format on an annual basis, usually beginning the week prior to Thanksgiving, like a number of other CC properties that broadcast similar formats in markets all over the country. Sunny 93.9 even had a morning show hosted by Madison Lane from 2004 to 2006, after serving as co-host of sister station G105's Bob and the Showgram for a number of years. However, this was one of many missteps made by Clear Channel since taking over that eventually led to Sunny's demise.

=== 93.9 KISS FM ===
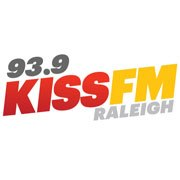
Logo as "KISS FM"

On December 25, 2006, at the end of its annual flip to all-Christmas, WRSN flipped formats to rhythmic AC, branded as "93.9 KISS FM". The last song "Sunny" played was the ending of "Don't Let The Sun Go Down On Me" by Elton John, cut in over a Christmas song. The call letters were changed to WKSL as part of the flip, which followed twelve hours of stunting with a loop of song clips and sound blurbs centered around the word "Kiss", incorporating the stunt from earlier that year that was heard on Greensboro sister station WFMX/WMKS into a longer loop.

In 2010, WKSL's musical direction evolved from rhythmic AC to Rhythmic Top 40, with most of the recurrents being phased out in favor of more current Rhythmic Pop/Dance hits. The move was seen as a response to competition from new Rhythmic Top 40 simulcasts WWPL/WPLW. By November 2010, Mediabase moved WKSL to the CHR/Rhythmic panel as a result of the changes in its presentation. By fall 2011, WKSL was the only rhythmic contemporary station in the Raleigh/Durham area following the WPLW/WWPL transition to Mainstream CHR.

=== B93.9 ===
On November 1, 2013, at 4 p.m., WKSL flipped formats to country, branded as "B93.9". The final song on "Kiss" was "Timber" by Pitbull, while the first song on "B" was "That's My Kind of Night" by Luke Bryan. The flip makes this the second time Clear Channel has tried a country format in the Raleigh-Durham area. WTKK, then known as "106.1 the Rooster", aired a country format from 2006 to 2009 before flipping to its current talk format. This move puts WKSL in direct competition with local powerhouse WQDR-FM. On August 1, 2014, WKSL changed callsigns to WNCB. The station, along with Greensboro sister WTQR, carries the syndicated Bobby Bones Show.

== Translators ==
Broadcast translators for WNCB-HD2
Call sign	Frequency	City of license	FID	ERP (W)	HAAT	Class	Transmitter coordinates	FCC info
W232CH	94.3 FM	Raleigh, North Carolina	156015	97	492.6 m (1,616 ft)	D	35°42′50.6″N 78°49′3″W	LMS
W270AW	101.9 FM	Sanford, North Carolina	148831	131	520 m (1,706 ft)	D	35°27′41″N 79°8′37.2″W	LMS
