= WRDU =

- Wake Forest, North Carolina; United States
- Broadcast area: Research Triangle and Eastern North Carolina
- Frequency: 100.7 MHz (HD Radio)
- Branding: 100.7 WRDU

Programming
- Format: Mainstream rock
- Subchannels: HD2: Simulcast of WRTP (Christian contemporary)

Ownership
- Owner: iHeartMedia; (iHM Licenses, LLC)
- Sister stations: WDCG, WNCB, WTKK, WDCG-HD2

History
- First air date: 1947; 79 years ago (as WCEC-FM)
- Former call signs: WCEC-FM (1947–1949); WFMA (1949–1986); WTRG (1986–2004); WRVA-FM (2004–2013); WTKK (2013)
- Call sign meaning: Raleigh-Durham (airport code)

Technical information
- Licensing authority: FCC
- Facility ID: 74125
- Class: C
- ERP: 100,000 watts
- HAAT: 600 meters (2,000 ft)
- Transmitter coordinates: 35°49′53.6″N 78°8′49″W
- Translator: HD2: See WRTP § Translators

Links
- Public license information: Public file; LMS
- Webcast: Listen live (via iHeartRadio)
- Website: wrdu.iheart.com

WRDU (100.7 FM, "100.7 WRDU") is a commercial radio station licensed to serve Wake Forest, North Carolina. The station is owned by iHeartMedia though licensee iHM Licenses, LLC and broadcasts a mainstream rock format. Its broadcast tower is near Middlesex at (35°49′52.8″N 78°08′42.8″W). The station covers Raleigh and the Research Triangle metro area, and a large portion of Eastern North Carolina, including the cities of Rocky Mount, Greenville, and Roanoke Rapids.

WRDU uses HD Radio.

== History ==
=== WCEC-FM/WFMA ===
In 1947, Mel Warner and his father-in-law, Rocky Mount Evening Telegram founder Josh Horne, signed on WCEC 810 AM and WCEC-FM 100.7 FM in Rocky Mount. The stations hired legendary agricultural broadcaster Ray Wilkinson in 1948, and along with WRAL-FM Raleigh and WGBR Goldsboro, started the Tobacco Network. It was sold to WRAL-FM owner A. J. Fletcher, and has grown into what is now known as the North Carolina News Network. Two years after its first sign on, the WCEC-FM call sign was changed to WFMA.

=== WTRG-FM ===
WFMA had a country format when Ken Johnson's Mobile, Alabama-based Capital Broadcasting (no relation to Raleigh's Capitol Broadcasting Company) bought it and moved its studios to Raleigh. The call sign was changed to WTRG around August 1986. (WCEC 810, now a stand-alone which was authorized for daytime operation only, went dark and its license was subsequently returned to the FCC.) Along with the studio move, WTRG was upgraded to a 100,000-watt signal using one of the tallest towers in North Carolina. The station, now with a 10,227-square-mile (26,490 km^{2}) coverage area, claimed the 17th largest coverage area of any FM station in America. WTRG signed on with the fight songs from Duke, UNC, and NC State before debuting with an oldies format, then evolving into classic rock, then changing to an adult contemporary format in May 1988.

WTRG returned to oldies in March 1989 as "Oldies 100.7". The station had 5.2 percent of the audience in Spring 1988 before switching to adult contemporary, but 2.3 percent in the fall. The focus would be on softer music from 1958 to 1972, with nothing louder than "Satisfaction" by The Rolling Stones.

Tom Joyner purchased WTRG in 1991 and built a community-minded station which took editorial stances: an example of this was the station's 1993 effort for increased rights of victims of violent crimes. With the relaxation of dual ownership rules, WTRG was sold in 1994 to Hicks Muse of Dallas, along with Carl Venters' WRDU, a move-in from nearby Wilson. That same year, WTRG picked up UNC Tar Heels radio broadcasts from WZZU.

Through several mergers, WTRG, WRDU and three other local stations became part of Clear Channel Communications, which would itself become iHeartMedia in 2014. On November 8, 2004, WTRG axed its longtime oldies format and began stunting with simulcasts of Clear Channel sister stations WRSN (now WNCB), WDCG, WDUR and WRDU (now WTKK). At 5 p.m. on November 12, the station switched to country as "100.7 The Bull".

=== WRVA-FM ===
WRVA-FM's logo under "100.7 The River" branding

However, "The Bull" also turned out to be a stunt, as three days later, on November 15, at 5 p.m., the station became adult album alternative-formatted "100.7 The River", with the new call sign WRVA-FM following shortly thereafter. Even though it shared the same call sign as fellow Clear Channel station WRVA, a 50,000-watt AM station licensed to serve Richmond, Virginia, the station was programmed independently. Per FCC requirements, the -FM suffix was attached to the call sign.

On September 25, 2006, The River shifted to a rock adult contemporary (Rock AC) format, albeit with the same branding and logo. In anticipation of sister station and heritage rocker WRDU's switch to a country format, which took place on October 6 of that year, "The River" shifted to classic hits.

In 2010, WRVA-FM changed its city of license from Rocky Mount to Wake Forest in part of a multi-station agreement that allowed Capitol Broadcasting sports outlet WCMC-FM 99.9 to increase its coverage.

During 2011, WRVA shifted toward more of a mainstream classic hits/Rock-leaning Gold AC format, including more 1960s rock music and non-disco pop music from the 1970s, while continuing to play 1980s music.

On November 11, 2011, at 6:00 p.m., after playing The Beatles' "Ticket to Ride" and going into Bobby Helms' "Jingle Bell Rock", WRVA-FM made the switch to all-Christmas music. It became the third station in the Clear Channel Raleigh cluster to make such a change. WRSN/WKSL made the holiday switch on an annual basis until 2007, and WRDU did likewise in 2009 when it switched from country music to talk radio (as that station lost the ratings and revenue battle to WQDR-FM). The switch led to rumors of a format change. On December 26, 2011, 100.7 The River returned with more of a mainstream classic hits format, including more 1960s and 1970s pop/R&B music, and less classic rock and 1980s music. This put the station in competition with Curtis Media's WKIX-FM.

Another format change took effect on June 8, 2012, with the station this time going in a more general classic rock direction, with artists such as Guns N' Roses, Van Halen, Pink Floyd, and ZZ Top. As of November 7, 2012, the River changed to a harder brand of classic rock, similar to WBBB, who switched formats to adult hits in November 2011, and longtime classic rocker 106.1 RDU.

=== WTKK/WRDU ===
Logo as a classic rock station

On March 27, 2013, WRVA-FM changed its call sign to WTKK. On March 28, the station released morning host Kitty Kinnin. The next day, the station began running liners promoting that "The River has dried up" and a change would happen on April 1 at 9:00 AM. At that time, after a 3-hour stunt with a loop of "Back in Black" by AC/DC and audio of a scene from School of Rock, the station relaunched as "Classic Rock, 100.7 WRDU", with actor/Tenacious D member Jack Black relaunching WRDU with the words "LET'S GET ROCKIN'!" The first song after the relaunch was "Eruption" by Van Halen. The WTKK call sign was moved to 106.1, which rebranded itself as "106.1 WTKK" with the slogan "More Stimulating Talk Radio", while the WRDU call sign was moved to 100.7.

On July 30, 2025, WRDU's format was slightly modified into a mainstream rock format; while the station maintains a classic rock base for the format, it was significantly expanded to include more active rock and alternative rock from the 1990s onward under the new slogan "Everything Rock & Alternative".

== Previous uses of the call sign ==
The WRDU call sign was once associated with Channel 28 (now WRDC-TV) from 1968 to 1978 when it was an NBC affiliate. In addition, a radio station with the WRDU call sign was depicted as "The Voice of the Durham Bulls" in the 1988 film Bull Durham, for which the previous WRDU (now WTKK) helped recruit extras in crowd scenes.
