= WDCG =

Contemporary hit radio station in Raleigh

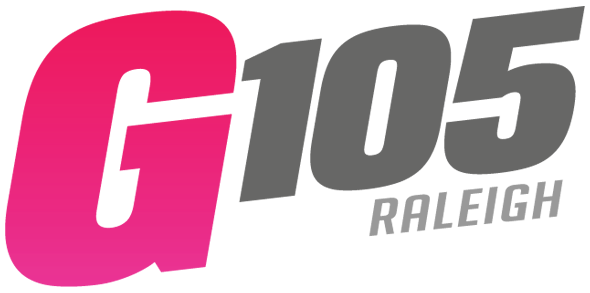
- Durham, North Carolina; United States
- Broadcast area: Research Triangle
- Frequency: 105.1 MHz (HD Radio)
- Branding: G105

Programming
- Format: Top 40 (CHR)
- Subchannels: HD2: Classic hip-hop (95.3 The Beat)
- Affiliations: Premiere Networks

Ownership
- Owner: iHeartMedia; (iHM Licenses, LLC)
- Sister stations: WNCB; WRDU; WTKK; W237BZ

History
- First air date: February 29, 1948
- Former call signs: WDNC-FM (1948–1974)
- Call sign meaning: "Durham's Country Giant" (previous format)

Technical information
- Licensing authority: FCC
- Facility ID: 53597
- Class: C1
- ERP: 73,000 watts
- HAAT: 339 meters (1,112 ft)
- Transmitter coordinates: 35°42′50.6″N 78°49′3″W
- Translators: HD2: 95.3 W237BZ (Clayton); HD2: 95.1 W236CA (Durham)

Links
- Public license information: Public file; LMS
- Webcast: Listen live (via iHeartRadio); HD2: Listen live (via iHeartRadio)
- Website: g105.iheart.com

WDCG (105.1 FM) is a commercial radio station licensed to Durham, North Carolina, and serving the Research Triangle radio market. It airs a Top 40 (CHR) format and is owned by iHeartMedia with studios on Smoketree Court in Raleigh's Highwoods Office Park. WDCG carries several nationally syndicated programs on weekdays: The Fred Show from WKSC-FM in Chicago, hosted by Christopher "Fred" Frederick, in morning drive time, and On Air with Ryan Seacrest in early afternoons.

WDCG has an effective radiated power (ERP) of 73,000 watts. The transmitter and tower are off Ten-Ten Road in Apex. WDCG broadcasts in the HD Radio format. The HD2 subchannel plays classic hip-hop as "95.3 The Beat". It feeds two FM translators at 95.1 and 95.3 MHz.

== History ==
=== WDNC-FM ===
The station signed on the air on February 29, 1948. Its original call sign was WDNC-FM, the sister station to WDNC on the AM band. Both were owned by Durham Morning Herald and The Durham Sun and were affiliates of the CBS Radio Network. The two stations largely simulcast their programming until the late 1960s. The FM station's debut coincided with the AM station's power increase and frequency shift from 1490 to 620 kilohertz.

In 1953, the Herald-Sun group joined WTIK owners Floyd Fletcher and Harmon Duncan in securing a license to operate a television station in Durham, which would eventually become WTVD Channel 11 the following year. WDNC-FM transmitted from an antenna located atop one of AM 620's three towers on Shocoree Drive in western Durham just off Interstate 85. (The old 105.1 FM antenna was visible on the easternmost tower until the site was razed in late 2017.)

In the late 1960s, the Federal Communications Commission (FCC) was encouraging AM-FM combos to offer separate programming. Around 1968, WDNC-FM began broadcasting an automated easy listening and middle of the road (MOR) format in FM stereo. In 1974, management decided to offer automated country music on the station. It changed its call letters to WDCG to stand for "Durham's Country Giant." WDCG later switched to album rock music in the late 1970s.

=== Top 40 ===
As FM Top 40 stations were increasing in popularity and young people were moving to the FM dial for their music, management decided to make a change. WDCG became a Top 40 station in Fall 1981. A year later, the station boosted its power to 100,000 watts and moved to the former WRDU-TV tower at Terrell's Mountain in southern Orange County. This allowed WDCG to put a city grade signal into Raleigh and Chapel Hill, as well as a 60 dbu signal into Greensboro, High Point and Winston-Salem, where the station even beat the local Top 40 stations from 60 miles away. WDCG, originally licensed to Durham, was the first station in the Research Triangle to obtain a dual city of license for station identification in 1982. It began identifying itself as "WDCG--Durham, Raleigh, Chapel Hill".

With minimal promotional money for advertising and give aways, WDCG grew every six months in the Arbitron ratings. Starting in the Fall of 1981, it went from a 1.8 - 4.5 - 9.0 - 9.8 - 11.1 - 14.5 by the Spring of 1984.

WDCG was operated as a loss leader for years by the Durham Herald-Sun. The owners predicted newspapers would someday be viewed on a computer screen. Even if WDCG was not earning much money, the newspaper could use a distribution system via WDCG's FM subcarrier that the competing newspaper, The Raleigh News and Observer, did not have. The Durham Herald-Sun had never separated the financial books of WDNC and WDCG. The combined stations had only been profitable in two of the 10 years prior to 1983. By 1984, WDCG alone was billing just under $4 million. Over $60,000 a month was coming in from the Greensboro-High Point market, 60 miles away, where WDCG had a dedicated salesperson.

WDCG operated from the Herald-Sun building in Downtown Durham from its 1948 sign-on until 1992. At that point, WDNC and WDCG moved to larger studios and offices at Park Forty Plaza in southern Durham near Research Triangle Park. The new facilities included state-of-the-art computer-integration, including software-controlled transmitters and audio playback from hard disk.

=== Changes in ownership and towers ===
In 1993, the Herald-Sun sold WDCG to Prizm Broadcasting, which had also purchased Vilcom's WZZU. In 2000, WDCG was acquired by Capstar, a forerunner to current owner iHeartMedia. The new management moved WDCG and its sister stations into Smoketree Tower in Raleigh, now called the Highwoods Building.

In 2004, WDCG's FM class was slightly downgraded from a Class "C" to a Class "C-0". The change was to allow co-owned WSGL in Roanoke, Virginia, to improve its signal. No changes were necessary to WDCG's actual facilities in the short term.

In March 2005, the FCC approved the station's moving its antenna from Terrells Mountain, west of Chapel Hill, to the former WLFL analog tower in Apex, closer to Raleigh. This was done to provide better coverage of the market, including some eastern communities that had previously gotten spotty coverage. The change included a drop in power from 100,000 watts to 73,000 watts and another downgrade in class, this time to Class "C-1". On March 13, 2008, WDCG began broadcasting from the Apex site. The tower is 1,112 feet (339 meters), while the antenna system is 984 feet (300 meters).) The move increased the covered population inside the station's signal by more than 500,000 persons.

=== Morning show changes ===
On April 3, 2023, Danny Meyers, host of Danny Meyers and the G105 Morning Show, along with co-host and social media manager Meghan Lamontagne, were let go from the station due to iHeartRadio's round of layoffs. Meyers had joined G105 as part of the wake up program known as the "Showgram" in February 2020. Lamontagne joined the morning show in July 2022 after former co-host Ashleyh Yemia left. Days later, co-host and executive producer Ben Harris also announced via Instagram that he had been dropped. The morning show's final episode had aired on March 31, 2023.

Meyers soon began hosting afternoons alongside Meghan Lane at WRMF in West Palm Beach. Harris later became part of The Jade Alexander Show in mornings at WFLC in Miami and Lamontagne began hosting the midday slot at WRAL-FM, succeeding Diane Ramsey. On May 1, 2023, iHeartMedia announced that syndicated wake-up program The Fred Show hosted by Chris "Fred" Frederick of WKSC-FM in Chicago would become G105's new morning drive time show.

== HD Radio and Translator ==
On November 16, 2012, an alternative rock format, marketed as "95X," debuted on WDCG's digital subchannel WDCG-HD2. Programming from the HD2 subchannel feeds FM translator station W237BZ at 95.3 MHz in Clayton, North Carolina. A second translator, W236CA at 95.1 MHz, in Durham, began simulcasting in late 2015. On January 9, 2018, 95X rebranded as "Alt 95.3".

On November 11, 2021, at 10 am, WDCG-HD2/W236CA/W237BZ dropped the alternative format and began playing Christmas music as "Christmas 95.3". On the day after Christmas, December 26, at 12:00 am, the station flipped to classic hip-hop, branded as "95.3 The Beat." The first song on "The Beat" was "Party Up (Up in Here)" by DMX.

== Former countdown shows ==
WDCG had carried The Rockin' America Top 30 Countdown with Scott Shannon in the 1980s. WDCG once carried American Top 40 with Casey Kasem in the early 80s. The current AT40 with Ryan Seacrest is now heard weekends on the station. WDCG also carried Rick Dees' Weekly Top 40 from its inception in the early 1980s.

== Notable past on-air staff ==
- Rick Freeman
- Mike Edwards

== W237BZ ==
W237BZ
Translator of WDCG-HD2, Durham
- Clayton, North Carolina; United States
- Broadcast area: Raleigh/Durham
- Frequency: 95.3 MHz
- Branding: 95.3 The Beat

Programming
- Format: Classic hip-hop

Ownership
- Owner: iHeartMedia, Inc.; (iHM Licenses, LLC)
- Sister stations: WNCB; WRDU; WTKK; WDCG

History
- First air date: March 2012

Technical information
- Licensing authority: FCC
- Facility ID: 157001
- Class: D
- ERP: 250 watts
- HAAT: 510.6 meters (1,675 ft)
- Transmitter coordinates: 35°42′50″N 78°49′4″W

Links
- Public license information: Public file; LMS
- Webcast: Listen live (via iHeartRadio)
- Website: 953thebeat.iheart.com

W237BZ, known on-air as 95.3 The Beat, is a radio station licensed to Clayton, North Carolina. The station airs a Classic hip-hop radio format. The station is operated by iHeartMedia (formerly Clear Channel Communications). The translator simulcasts the programming of WDCG-HD2, along with a second translator, W236CA in Durham, which began simulcasting on 95.1 FM in late 2015.

=== History ===
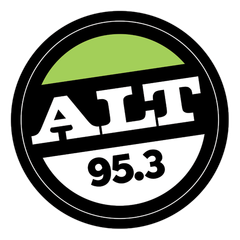
Alt 95.3 logo used from 2018 to 2021

Logo used during the station's stunting as Christmas 95.3 until December 25, 2021

W237BZ began broadcasting in November 2012 as a translator for WDCG-HD2, which signed on with an Alternative Rock format as "95X".

On January 9, 2018, the station rebranded as "Alt 95.3".

On November 11, 2021, at 10 a.m., WDCG-HD2/W236CA/W237BZ dumped the alternative format after 9 years and began stunting with Christmas music as "Christmas 95.3".

On December 20, 2021, 95.3 started airing sweepers for its future format, Classic Hip Hop as "95.3 The Beat", which would debut on December 26. At midnight on that date, after playing "Little Drummer Boy" by Bob Seger, W237BZ, W236CA, and WDCG-HD2 officially flipped to Classic Hip Hop as "95.3 The Beat". The first song on "The Beat" was "Party Up (Up in Here)" by DMX. The station is running 5,000 commercial-free songs in a row to launch its new format.

=== Translators ===
Broadcast translators for WDCG-HD2
Call sign	Frequency	City of license	FID	ERP (W)	HAAT	Class	Transmitter coordinates	FCC info
W237BZ	95.3 FM	Clayton, North Carolina	157001	250	510.6 m (1,675 ft)	D	35°42′50.4″N 78°49′4″W	LMS
W236CA	95.1 FM	Durham, North Carolina	87686	200	142 m (466 ft)	D	35°58′39.5″N 78°48′58″W	LMS
