= WTKK =

- Knightdale, North Carolina; United States
- Broadcast area: Raleigh/Durham; Research Triangle
- Frequency: 106.1 MHz (HD Radio)
- Branding: 106.1 FM Talk

Programming
- Format: Talk
- Subchannels: HD2: Sports
- Network: Fox News Radio
- Affiliations: Compass Media Networks; Premiere Networks; WNCN

Ownership
- Owner: iHeartMedia; (iHM Licenses, LLC)
- Sister stations: WDCG; WNCB; WRDU; WDCG-HD2

History
- First air date: March 1, 1961
- Former call signs: WVOT-FM (1961–1976); WXYY (1976–1984); WRDU (1984–2013)
- Call sign meaning: "Talk"

Technical information
- Licensing authority: FCC
- Facility ID: 73936
- Class: C1
- ERP: 27,500 watts
- HAAT: 489 meters (1,604 ft)
- Transmitter coordinates: 35°40′28.6″N 78°31′39″W

Links
- Public license information: Public file; LMS
- Webcast: Listen live (via iHeartRadio); HD2: Listen live (via iHeartRadio)
- Website: 1061fmtalk.iheart.com; HD2: foxsportsraleigh.iheart.com

WTKK (106.1 FM "106.1 FM Talk") is a commercial radio station licensed to Knightdale, North Carolina, and serving the Raleigh-Durham market, also known as the Research Triangle. WTKK airs a talk radio format and is owned and operated by iHeartMedia, Inc. Studios are located in Raleigh, while the transmitter resides in Auburn. In addition to a standard analog transmission, WTKK broadcasts in HD Radio with two subchannels and is available online via iHeartRadio.

== History ==
=== WVOT/WXYY ===
The station began as WVOT-FM in Wilson, North Carolina, on March 1, 1961. It shared a studio and transmitter building on Herring Avenue in Wilson with its AM sister station, WVOT (1420 AM). That building burned in 1992. WVOT later operated from an old house on Jackson Street. In the early days, both WVOT AM and FM largely simulcast a MOR, full service format until the duo was acquired by Century Communications in 1976. The FM was renamed WXYY and switched to an automated album rock format known as "Super Rock".

By 1980, WXYY had switched to country music but was still automated. In 1983, the stations were purchased by Voyager Communications. A new tower, which would allow a much better signal into Raleigh, was built west of Wilson in Middlesex. New studios were set up in Raleigh.

=== Move to the Triangle/WRDU-FM ===
In August 1984, WXYY signed off in Wilson and signed on from Raleigh as "WRDU 106". The station returned to the air on Labor Day weekend of 1984, playing the Rolling Stones' "Start Me Up" as its first song. Many of the first on-air personalities migrated over from rival rock station WQDR-FM, including Bob Walton, Gayle Rancer, Bob Robinson (who was the only original WRDU staffer still with the station when it went country in 2006) and Tom Guild (who was on the air the night of sign-on). WQDR-FM, after 11 years as a rock station, made the switch to country a few days after WRDU's debut.

WRDU's early format was album-oriented rock with some hot AC artists such as Cyndi Lauper, Lionel Richie, and the Pointer Sisters added to the mix, probably to soften the sound a bit in anticipation of a duel with crosstown powerhouse WRAL. But by the late 1980s, WRDU's hot AC tunes were officially all gone and the station, bolstered by high listenership for its "Reynolds & Silva" morning show, dominated the Triangle ratings. Arguably, the pinnacle of WRDU's success came in the early 1990s when it won the Rolling Stone Magazine Reader's Poll as "best station of the year" for several straight years starting in 1989. Other airstaff members who worked at the station during the late 1980s and the early 1990s were Donna Reed (Nights); Eric Curry (News), Ron Phillips (Rock & Roll Classics), Tom Gongaware, Lizz Wall, and Paul Jackson.

=== Ownership changes ===
The Telecommunications Act of 1996 brought about many changes to radio, including WRDU. Purchased initially from Voyager Communications Inc. by Hicks, Muse, Tate, & Furst, HMW Communications of Atlanta sold WRDU and WTRG to SFX Broadcasting for $36.8 million in a deal completed in mid-1996. SFX was in turn acquired by Capstar Broadcasting, which was itself taken over by Chancellor Media Corporation, renamed AMFM Inc. When the dust settled in 1999, WRDU was owned by Clear Channel Communications (forerunner of iHeartMedia). Their Raleigh holdings also included sister stations WDCG, WTRG, and WRSN.

After the initial purchase of the station by SFX Broadcasting, a decline in ratings began. WZZU, also a classic rock station, was brought into the fold when Prism Broadcasting Partners was purchased. With no need for two rock stations in the stable, WZZU was flipped to lite AC as Sunny 93.9 (WRSN). WRDU program director Tom Guild was moved to WTRG programming, while former WZZU Program Director Bob Edwards assumed those duties for WRDU. The Silva and the Blade morning show was replaced by the John Boy and Billy syndicated morning show.

=== More changes at 106.1RDU ===
On July 4, 2001, the station would shake-up again, flipping from classic rock to mainstream rock.

On October 6, 2006, at 4 p.m., after playing "Free Bird" by Lynyrd Skynyrd, WRDU began stunting with a clip of "Rooster" by Alice in Chains and redirecting listeners to WRVA-FM. At 5 p.m., Clear Channel changed the station's format back to country. The station then became known as "106.1 The Rooster", with "Today's Country and the Legends". Syndicated duo John Boy and Billy returned to the Raleigh-Durham market to do mornings on the new station.

=== Talk radio ===
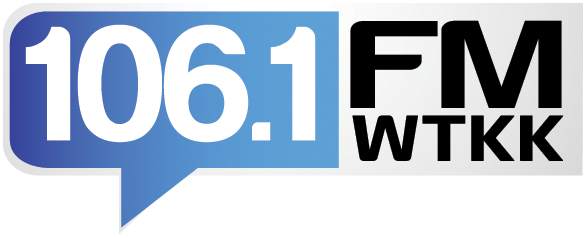
Previous logo

WRDU general manager Dick Harlow announced on November 2, 2009, that WRDU would change to conservative talk radio in 2010, with Rush Limbaugh, Glenn Beck and Sean Hannity as featured shows. The station would feature Limbaugh's first name as its slogan, "Rush Radio". On November 15, 2009, WRDU pulled the plug on its country format and switched to "106.1 RDU Christmas". On January 1, 2010, the station became news/talk as "106.1 Rush Radio".

In 2011, co-owned WPTI in Greensboro added WRDU's morning show.

In April 2013, WRDU changed its letters to WTKK and dropped the "Rush Radio" brand.

=== Sports ===
WTKK served for many years as the FM flagship of the Tar Heel Sports Network, which broadcasts football and basketball games involving the University of North Carolina at Chapel Hill Tar Heels. This arrangement came into question following comments made by Rush Limbaugh regarding Sandra Fluke, a law student from Georgetown University. From then on, Learfield (who produced UNC's sports programming) told the station it could no longer promote the school or radio network during Rush, while any promos or station identifications promoting Rush were likewise terminated during THSN coverage, eventually hastening the end of the "Rush Radio" brand in the market. The arrangement ended upon Limbaugh's death in 2021 and was rendered moot with the move of the THSN in the Triangle to WPTF the same year.

WTKK also broadcasts Minor League Baseball games of the Carolina Mudcats on its second HD Radio channel, which is part of an expanded broadcast sports package. On August 5, 2024, WTKK began carrying Fox Sports Radio programming on the HD2 subchannel, branded as "Fox Sports 106.1 HD2".

== Programming ==
WTKK's lone local program is a morning show hosted by K.C. O'Dea, which is simulcast with WPTI in Greensboro. Syndicated programming comprises the rest of the weekday schedule: The Glenn Beck Radio Program, The Clay Travis and Buck Sexton Show, The Sean Hannity Show, The Ramsey Show, The Jesse Kelly Show and Coast to Coast AM.
